= List of minor planets: 472001–473000 =

The following is a partial list of minor planets, running from minor-planet number 472001 through 473000, inclusive. The primary data for this and other partial lists is based on JPL's "Small-Body Orbital Elements" and data available from the Minor Planet Center. Critical list information is also provided by the MPC, unless otherwise specified from Lowell Observatory. A detailed description of the table's columns and additional sources are given on the main page including a complete list of every page in this series, and a statistical break-up on the dynamical classification of minor planets.

Also see the summary list of all named bodies in numerical and alphabetical order, and the corresponding naming citations for the number range of this particular list. New namings may only be added to this list after official publication, as the preannouncement of names is condemned by the Working Group for Small Bodies Nomenclature of the International Astronomical Union.

| Near-Earth obj. | MBA (inner) | MBA (outer) | Centaur |
| Mars-crosser | MBA (middle) | Jupiter trojan | Trans-Neptunian obj. |
| Unclassified |

== 472001–472100 ==
| Designation | | | Discovery | | | Properties | | Ref |
| Permanent | Provisional | Named after | Date | Site | Discoverer(s) | Category | Diam. | Ref |
|---|---|---|---|---|---|---|---|---|
| 472001 | 2013 WL_{41} | — | October 30, 2002 | Kitt Peak | Spacewatch | NYS | 870 m | MPC · JPL |
| 472002 | 2013 WA_{42} | — | November 17, 2006 | Kitt Peak | Spacewatch | · | 960 m | MPC · JPL |
| 472003 | 2013 WO_{57} | — | May 20, 2012 | Mount Lemmon | Mount Lemmon Survey | V | 580 m | MPC · JPL |
| 472004 | 2013 WV_{58} | — | November 18, 2006 | Kitt Peak | Spacewatch | · | 600 m | MPC · JPL |
| 472005 | 2013 WE_{59} | — | December 10, 2004 | Socorro | LINEAR | · | 2.2 km | MPC · JPL |
| 472006 | 2013 WB_{62} | — | October 24, 2013 | Kitt Peak | Spacewatch | NYS | 880 m | MPC · JPL |
| 472007 | 2013 WA_{66} | — | October 16, 2006 | Catalina | CSS | · | 770 m | MPC · JPL |
| 472008 | 2013 WR_{71} | — | January 17, 2007 | Kitt Peak | Spacewatch | NYS | 910 m | MPC · JPL |
| 472009 | 2013 WO_{80} | — | October 28, 2013 | Mount Lemmon | Mount Lemmon Survey | · | 1.5 km | MPC · JPL |
| 472010 | 2013 WK_{84} | — | December 3, 1996 | Kitt Peak | Spacewatch | · | 640 m | MPC · JPL |
| 472011 | 2013 WA_{90} | — | October 31, 2013 | Kitt Peak | Spacewatch | · | 750 m | MPC · JPL |
| 472012 | 2013 WC_{105} | — | November 12, 2013 | Mount Lemmon | Mount Lemmon Survey | · | 1.4 km | MPC · JPL |
| 472013 | 2013 WX_{105} | — | September 12, 2013 | Mount Lemmon | Mount Lemmon Survey | · | 1.1 km | MPC · JPL |
| 472014 | 2013 XT | — | November 28, 2013 | Kitt Peak | Spacewatch | · | 2.2 km | MPC · JPL |
| 472015 | 2013 XW | — | October 3, 2013 | Mount Lemmon | Mount Lemmon Survey | · | 1.5 km | MPC · JPL |
| 472016 | 2013 XM_{5} | — | October 4, 2006 | Mount Lemmon | Mount Lemmon Survey | · | 650 m | MPC · JPL |
| 472017 | 2013 XR_{7} | — | October 3, 2005 | Kitt Peak | Spacewatch | · | 1.3 km | MPC · JPL |
| 472018 | 2013 XD_{13} | — | December 22, 2003 | Kitt Peak | Spacewatch | · | 2.0 km | MPC · JPL |
| 472019 | 2013 XW_{17} | — | January 7, 2010 | Kitt Peak | Spacewatch | EUN | 880 m | MPC · JPL |
| 472020 | 2013 XF_{18} | — | March 31, 2010 | WISE | WISE | · | 2.6 km | MPC · JPL |
| 472021 | 2013 XH_{18} | — | April 13, 2011 | Mount Lemmon | Mount Lemmon Survey | · | 1.9 km | MPC · JPL |
| 472022 | 2013 XQ_{19} | — | May 23, 2011 | Mount Lemmon | Mount Lemmon Survey | · | 2.4 km | MPC · JPL |
| 472023 | 2013 XU_{19} | — | December 10, 2009 | Mount Lemmon | Mount Lemmon Survey | · | 1.4 km | MPC · JPL |
| 472024 | 2013 XQ_{25} | — | November 28, 2013 | Mount Lemmon | Mount Lemmon Survey | · | 1.3 km | MPC · JPL |
| 472025 | 2013 YW_{4} | — | December 23, 2013 | Mount Lemmon | Mount Lemmon Survey | · | 1.6 km | MPC · JPL |
| 472026 | 2013 YH_{5} | — | December 20, 2009 | Mount Lemmon | Mount Lemmon Survey | · | 1.2 km | MPC · JPL |
| 472027 | 2013 YW_{8} | — | October 14, 2009 | Mount Lemmon | Mount Lemmon Survey | · | 1.0 km | MPC · JPL |
| 472028 | 2013 YB_{11} | — | January 27, 2006 | Catalina | CSS | · | 2.6 km | MPC · JPL |
| 472029 | 2013 YT_{12} | — | January 13, 2010 | WISE | WISE | · | 2.7 km | MPC · JPL |
| 472030 | 2013 YQ_{13} | — | December 25, 2013 | Mount Lemmon | Mount Lemmon Survey | · | 2.0 km | MPC · JPL |
| 472031 | 2013 YN_{17} | — | February 22, 2007 | Kitt Peak | Spacewatch | NYS | 870 m | MPC · JPL |
| 472032 | 2013 YX_{19} | — | December 14, 2013 | Mount Lemmon | Mount Lemmon Survey | · | 1.4 km | MPC · JPL |
| 472033 | 2013 YL_{23} | — | November 26, 2013 | Mount Lemmon | Mount Lemmon Survey | · | 1.8 km | MPC · JPL |
| 472034 | 2013 YR_{28} | — | December 10, 2013 | Mount Lemmon | Mount Lemmon Survey | · | 1.3 km | MPC · JPL |
| 472035 | 2013 YL_{29} | — | December 12, 2006 | Kitt Peak | Spacewatch | · | 670 m | MPC · JPL |
| 472036 | 2013 YB_{30} | — | September 21, 2008 | Mount Lemmon | Mount Lemmon Survey | MAR | 1.3 km | MPC · JPL |
| 472037 | 2013 YN_{31} | — | December 7, 2008 | Mount Lemmon | Mount Lemmon Survey | · | 2.2 km | MPC · JPL |
| 472038 | 2013 YQ_{31} | — | June 20, 2007 | Kitt Peak | Spacewatch | EUN | 1.5 km | MPC · JPL |
| 472039 | 2013 YO_{34} | — | December 26, 2013 | XuYi | PMO NEO Survey Program | EUN | 1.5 km | MPC · JPL |
| 472040 | 2013 YS_{37} | — | June 7, 2010 | WISE | WISE | ADE | 2.3 km | MPC · JPL |
| 472041 | 2013 YQ_{39} | — | October 16, 2012 | Mount Lemmon | Mount Lemmon Survey | AGN | 1.1 km | MPC · JPL |
| 472042 | 2013 YS_{39} | — | December 21, 2008 | Mount Lemmon | Mount Lemmon Survey | KOR | 1.5 km | MPC · JPL |
| 472043 | 2013 YZ_{39} | — | September 7, 2004 | Kitt Peak | Spacewatch | (5) | 1.1 km | MPC · JPL |
| 472044 | 2013 YD_{40} | — | February 17, 2009 | Dauban | C. Rinner, F. Kugel | · | 2.5 km | MPC · JPL |
| 472045 | 2013 YS_{41} | — | January 6, 2010 | Mount Lemmon | Mount Lemmon Survey | EUN | 1.0 km | MPC · JPL |
| 472046 | 2013 YY_{42} | — | October 28, 2013 | Mount Lemmon | Mount Lemmon Survey | · | 2.1 km | MPC · JPL |
| 472047 | 2013 YL_{43} | — | September 29, 2008 | Mount Lemmon | Mount Lemmon Survey | · | 1.4 km | MPC · JPL |
| 472048 | 2013 YD_{46} | — | August 15, 2009 | Kitt Peak | Spacewatch | · | 660 m | MPC · JPL |
| 472049 | 2013 YS_{46} | — | December 27, 2013 | Kitt Peak | Spacewatch | · | 2.3 km | MPC · JPL |
| 472050 | 2013 YE_{49} | — | October 31, 2013 | Mount Lemmon | Mount Lemmon Survey | · | 1.6 km | MPC · JPL |
| 472051 | 2013 YY_{49} | — | October 8, 2012 | Mount Lemmon | Mount Lemmon Survey | MAR | 1.2 km | MPC · JPL |
| 472052 | 2013 YE_{50} | — | October 27, 2005 | Anderson Mesa | LONEOS | · | 1.1 km | MPC · JPL |
| 472053 | 2013 YJ_{52} | — | December 27, 2006 | Mount Lemmon | Mount Lemmon Survey | V | 510 m | MPC · JPL |
| 472054 Tupaia | 2013 YA_{55} | Tupaia | December 20, 2009 | Mount Lemmon | Mount Lemmon Survey | ADE | 1.9 km | MPC · JPL |
| 472055 | 2013 YK_{56} | — | January 6, 2010 | Kitt Peak | Spacewatch | · | 1.7 km | MPC · JPL |
| 472056 | 2013 YM_{58} | — | November 28, 2013 | Kitt Peak | Spacewatch | MAR | 1.3 km | MPC · JPL |
| 472057 | 2013 YE_{61} | — | June 6, 2010 | WISE | WISE | · | 1.7 km | MPC · JPL |
| 472058 | 2013 YS_{62} | — | October 12, 2009 | Mount Lemmon | Mount Lemmon Survey | NYS | 1.1 km | MPC · JPL |
| 472059 | 2013 YE_{65} | — | November 2, 2006 | Mount Lemmon | Mount Lemmon Survey | · | 820 m | MPC · JPL |
| 472060 | 2013 YX_{68} | — | October 17, 2012 | Mount Lemmon | Mount Lemmon Survey | · | 2.9 km | MPC · JPL |
| 472061 | 2013 YB_{69} | — | September 28, 2009 | Catalina | CSS | · | 1.2 km | MPC · JPL |
| 472062 | 2013 YO_{69} | — | September 25, 2008 | Mount Lemmon | Mount Lemmon Survey | (5) | 960 m | MPC · JPL |
| 472063 | 2013 YV_{69} | — | May 17, 2010 | Kitt Peak | Spacewatch | · | 2.8 km | MPC · JPL |
| 472064 | 2013 YW_{73} | — | December 20, 2009 | Mount Lemmon | Mount Lemmon Survey | · | 1.4 km | MPC · JPL |
| 472065 | 2013 YY_{74} | — | February 23, 2007 | Kitt Peak | Spacewatch | · | 1.3 km | MPC · JPL |
| 472066 | 2013 YZ_{80} | — | June 4, 2011 | Mount Lemmon | Mount Lemmon Survey | · | 2.5 km | MPC · JPL |
| 472067 | 2013 YB_{83} | — | January 22, 2006 | Mount Lemmon | Mount Lemmon Survey | · | 880 m | MPC · JPL |
| 472068 | 2013 YQ_{83} | — | October 6, 2005 | Mount Lemmon | Mount Lemmon Survey | · | 850 m | MPC · JPL |
| 472069 | 2013 YM_{84} | — | March 15, 2007 | Kitt Peak | Spacewatch | · | 1.3 km | MPC · JPL |
| 472070 | 2013 YB_{87} | — | January 26, 2006 | Catalina | CSS | · | 1.4 km | MPC · JPL |
| 472071 | 2013 YW_{89} | — | January 15, 2005 | Kitt Peak | Spacewatch | · | 2.3 km | MPC · JPL |
| 472072 | 2013 YJ_{90} | — | September 20, 2008 | Mount Lemmon | Mount Lemmon Survey | · | 1.8 km | MPC · JPL |
| 472073 | 2013 YN_{90} | — | December 28, 2013 | Kitt Peak | Spacewatch | GEF | 1.1 km | MPC · JPL |
| 472074 | 2013 YR_{92} | — | December 31, 2005 | Kitt Peak | Spacewatch | · | 2.3 km | MPC · JPL |
| 472075 | 2013 YS_{93} | — | March 26, 2010 | WISE | WISE | · | 3.7 km | MPC · JPL |
| 472076 | 2013 YL_{95} | — | December 30, 2013 | Kitt Peak | Spacewatch | · | 1.9 km | MPC · JPL |
| 472077 | 2013 YS_{96} | — | September 11, 2004 | Kitt Peak | Spacewatch | (5) | 960 m | MPC · JPL |
| 472078 | 2013 YM_{99} | — | September 23, 2008 | Mount Lemmon | Mount Lemmon Survey | · | 1.2 km | MPC · JPL |
| 472079 | 2013 YZ_{102} | — | November 10, 2009 | Mount Lemmon | Mount Lemmon Survey | · | 1.2 km | MPC · JPL |
| 472080 | 2013 YF_{107} | — | March 14, 2010 | Mount Lemmon | Mount Lemmon Survey | · | 1.5 km | MPC · JPL |
| 472081 | 2013 YT_{110} | — | May 28, 2011 | Mount Lemmon | Mount Lemmon Survey | · | 1.1 km | MPC · JPL |
| 472082 | 2013 YR_{114} | — | December 19, 2004 | Mount Lemmon | Mount Lemmon Survey | · | 2.0 km | MPC · JPL |
| 472083 | 2013 YP_{115} | — | January 9, 1997 | Kitt Peak | Spacewatch | · | 1.3 km | MPC · JPL |
| 472084 | 2013 YK_{117} | — | September 21, 2008 | Kitt Peak | Spacewatch | · | 1.6 km | MPC · JPL |
| 472085 | 2013 YG_{125} | — | February 2, 2001 | Kitt Peak | Spacewatch | · | 1.4 km | MPC · JPL |
| 472086 | 2013 YM_{128} | — | December 27, 2006 | Mount Lemmon | Mount Lemmon Survey | · | 750 m | MPC · JPL |
| 472087 | 2013 YK_{129} | — | September 29, 2008 | Mount Lemmon | Mount Lemmon Survey | EUN | 1.2 km | MPC · JPL |
| 472088 | 2013 YQ_{129} | — | December 21, 2000 | Kitt Peak | Spacewatch | · | 1.5 km | MPC · JPL |
| 472089 | 2013 YP_{143} | — | November 28, 2013 | Mount Lemmon | Mount Lemmon Survey | · | 1 km | MPC · JPL |
| 472090 | 2013 YG_{144} | — | February 27, 2007 | Kitt Peak | Spacewatch | · | 1.1 km | MPC · JPL |
| 472091 | 2013 YO_{144} | — | October 8, 2004 | Kitt Peak | Spacewatch | · | 1.1 km | MPC · JPL |
| 472092 | 2013 YA_{148} | — | October 7, 2004 | Kitt Peak | Spacewatch | (5) | 1.3 km | MPC · JPL |
| 472093 | 2013 YU_{148} | — | October 29, 2005 | Mount Lemmon | Mount Lemmon Survey | BRG | 1.4 km | MPC · JPL |
| 472094 | 2013 YD_{149} | — | October 7, 2008 | Mount Lemmon | Mount Lemmon Survey | (5) | 1.5 km | MPC · JPL |
| 472095 | 2014 AB_{2} | — | December 18, 2007 | Mount Lemmon | Mount Lemmon Survey | · | 2.8 km | MPC · JPL |
| 472096 | 2014 AU_{7} | — | November 20, 2008 | Kitt Peak | Spacewatch | WIT | 1.1 km | MPC · JPL |
| 472097 | 2014 AD_{8} | — | June 11, 2005 | Kitt Peak | Spacewatch | · | 2.8 km | MPC · JPL |
| 472098 | 2014 AM_{21} | — | July 30, 2008 | Mount Lemmon | Mount Lemmon Survey | · | 980 m | MPC · JPL |
| 472099 | 2014 AB_{22} | — | November 21, 2009 | Mount Lemmon | Mount Lemmon Survey | · | 1.2 km | MPC · JPL |
| 472100 | 2014 AF_{22} | — | January 3, 2014 | Kitt Peak | Spacewatch | AGN | 980 m | MPC · JPL |

== 472101–472200 ==
back to top

| Designation | | | Discovery | | | Properties | | Ref |
| Permanent | Provisional | Named after | Date | Site | Discoverer(s) | Category | Diam. | Ref |
|---|---|---|---|---|---|---|---|---|
| 472101 | 2014 AF_{27} | — | February 9, 2010 | Catalina | CSS | · | 2.6 km | MPC · JPL |
| 472102 | 2014 AU_{29} | — | April 15, 2010 | WISE | WISE | · | 5.9 km | MPC · JPL |
| 472103 | 2014 AV_{29} | — | November 27, 2009 | Mount Lemmon | Mount Lemmon Survey | · | 1.2 km | MPC · JPL |
| 472104 | 2014 AA_{31} | — | January 3, 2014 | Mount Lemmon | Mount Lemmon Survey | · | 1.4 km | MPC · JPL |
| 472105 | 2014 AC_{36} | — | October 1, 2008 | Kitt Peak | Spacewatch | HOF | 2.7 km | MPC · JPL |
| 472106 | 2014 AP_{42} | — | August 12, 2012 | Kitt Peak | Spacewatch | · | 1.9 km | MPC · JPL |
| 472107 | 2014 AT_{42} | — | December 28, 2013 | Kitt Peak | Spacewatch | · | 1.8 km | MPC · JPL |
| 472108 | 2014 AE_{43} | — | June 21, 2010 | Mount Lemmon | Mount Lemmon Survey | · | 3.3 km | MPC · JPL |
| 472109 | 2014 AS_{52} | — | May 27, 2012 | Mount Lemmon | Mount Lemmon Survey | PHO | 1.1 km | MPC · JPL |
| 472110 | 2014 AB_{53} | — | July 30, 2008 | Kitt Peak | Spacewatch | · | 1.6 km | MPC · JPL |
| 472111 | 2014 AJ_{54} | — | December 15, 2009 | Mount Lemmon | Mount Lemmon Survey | MAR | 1.0 km | MPC · JPL |
| 472112 | 2014 BK_{2} | — | October 26, 2008 | Mount Lemmon | Mount Lemmon Survey | · | 1.6 km | MPC · JPL |
| 472113 | 2014 BU_{3} | — | December 20, 2009 | Mount Lemmon | Mount Lemmon Survey | · | 1.8 km | MPC · JPL |
| 472114 | 2014 BJ_{4} | — | July 5, 2005 | Kitt Peak | Spacewatch | · | 920 m | MPC · JPL |
| 472115 | 2014 BB_{8} | — | March 1, 2009 | Mount Lemmon | Mount Lemmon Survey | · | 3.1 km | MPC · JPL |
| 472116 | 2014 BH_{10} | — | April 7, 2006 | Kitt Peak | Spacewatch | · | 3.2 km | MPC · JPL |
| 472117 | 2014 BK_{13} | — | December 30, 2013 | Mount Lemmon | Mount Lemmon Survey | · | 1.3 km | MPC · JPL |
| 472118 | 2014 BW_{13} | — | November 3, 2008 | Kitt Peak | Spacewatch | · | 1.5 km | MPC · JPL |
| 472119 | 2014 BP_{19} | — | August 29, 2005 | Kitt Peak | Spacewatch | · | 920 m | MPC · JPL |
| 472120 | 2014 BR_{19} | — | January 21, 2014 | Mount Lemmon | Mount Lemmon Survey | · | 2.0 km | MPC · JPL |
| 472121 | 2014 BD_{23} | — | August 30, 2002 | Kitt Peak | Spacewatch | MRX | 1.2 km | MPC · JPL |
| 472122 | 2014 BH_{23} | — | March 21, 2010 | WISE | WISE | · | 1.9 km | MPC · JPL |
| 472123 | 2014 BO_{23} | — | January 23, 2006 | Kitt Peak | Spacewatch | · | 1.2 km | MPC · JPL |
| 472124 | 2014 BM_{24} | — | December 5, 2012 | Mount Lemmon | Mount Lemmon Survey | EOS | 2.2 km | MPC · JPL |
| 472125 | 2014 BV_{24} | — | April 14, 2004 | Kitt Peak | Spacewatch | EMA | 2.5 km | MPC · JPL |
| 472126 | 2014 BY_{28} | — | December 15, 2004 | Kitt Peak | Spacewatch | · | 1.7 km | MPC · JPL |
| 472127 | 2014 BL_{30} | — | March 11, 2005 | Mount Lemmon | Mount Lemmon Survey | · | 2.0 km | MPC · JPL |
| 472128 | 2014 BA_{32} | — | August 12, 2012 | Kitt Peak | Spacewatch | · | 2.1 km | MPC · JPL |
| 472129 | 2014 BM_{34} | — | May 23, 2010 | WISE | WISE | · | 4.7 km | MPC · JPL |
| 472130 | 2014 BK_{37} | — | September 17, 2006 | Anderson Mesa | LONEOS | · | 4.4 km | MPC · JPL |
| 472131 | 2014 BK_{40} | — | November 3, 2007 | Mount Lemmon | Mount Lemmon Survey | · | 1.4 km | MPC · JPL |
| 472132 | 2014 BE_{43} | — | February 16, 2010 | Catalina | CSS | · | 3.7 km | MPC · JPL |
| 472133 | 2014 BM_{44} | — | October 21, 2008 | Kitt Peak | Spacewatch | · | 1.4 km | MPC · JPL |
| 472134 | 2014 BQ_{53} | — | December 6, 2008 | Kitt Peak | Spacewatch | EOS | 1.9 km | MPC · JPL |
| 472135 | 2014 BW_{53} | — | November 19, 2007 | Kitt Peak | Spacewatch | · | 1.5 km | MPC · JPL |
| 472136 | 2014 BG_{54} | — | April 28, 2011 | Kitt Peak | Spacewatch | MAR | 990 m | MPC · JPL |
| 472137 | 2014 BY_{57} | — | December 31, 2007 | Catalina | CSS | · | 4.5 km | MPC · JPL |
| 472138 | 2014 BJ_{61} | — | November 29, 2013 | Mount Lemmon | Mount Lemmon Survey | EUN | 1.6 km | MPC · JPL |
| 472139 | 2014 BW_{63} | — | November 1, 2005 | Mount Lemmon | Mount Lemmon Survey | · | 1.3 km | MPC · JPL |
| 472140 | 2014 BJ_{64} | — | October 7, 2008 | Kitt Peak | Spacewatch | · | 1.8 km | MPC · JPL |
| 472141 | 2014 BM_{64} | — | October 17, 2012 | Mount Lemmon | Mount Lemmon Survey | · | 1.9 km | MPC · JPL |
| 472142 | 2014 BN_{64} | — | December 14, 2001 | Socorro | LINEAR | · | 4.1 km | MPC · JPL |
| 472143 | 2014 CK_{2} | — | March 4, 2005 | Mount Lemmon | Mount Lemmon Survey | · | 1.7 km | MPC · JPL |
| 472144 | 2014 CH_{3} | — | January 8, 2010 | Mount Lemmon | Mount Lemmon Survey | EUN | 1.1 km | MPC · JPL |
| 472145 | 2014 CG_{6} | — | May 16, 2010 | WISE | WISE | · | 3.9 km | MPC · JPL |
| 472146 | 2014 CD_{8} | — | September 25, 2006 | Kitt Peak | Spacewatch | · | 2.4 km | MPC · JPL |
| 472147 | 2014 CD_{10} | — | February 8, 2008 | Mount Lemmon | Mount Lemmon Survey | · | 2.4 km | MPC · JPL |
| 472148 | 2014 CN_{17} | — | February 16, 2010 | Kitt Peak | Spacewatch | EUN | 1.3 km | MPC · JPL |
| 472149 | 2014 CK_{20} | — | March 2, 1997 | Kitt Peak | Spacewatch | · | 3.9 km | MPC · JPL |
| 472150 | 2014 CL_{20} | — | February 13, 2010 | Mount Lemmon | Mount Lemmon Survey | MAR | 3.5 km | MPC · JPL |
| 472151 | 2014 CO_{20} | — | February 13, 2010 | Catalina | CSS | · | 2.1 km | MPC · JPL |
| 472152 | 2014 DA_{1} | — | December 30, 2007 | Kitt Peak | Spacewatch | · | 2.9 km | MPC · JPL |
| 472153 | 2014 DX_{5} | — | March 15, 2001 | Kitt Peak | Spacewatch | · | 2.5 km | MPC · JPL |
| 472154 | 2014 DW_{6} | — | September 28, 2008 | Mount Lemmon | Mount Lemmon Survey | BRG | 1.1 km | MPC · JPL |
| 472155 | 2014 DM_{11} | — | October 23, 2004 | Kitt Peak | Spacewatch | · | 1.1 km | MPC · JPL |
| 472156 | 2014 DP_{11} | — | March 4, 2005 | Catalina | CSS | · | 2.8 km | MPC · JPL |
| 472157 | 2014 DE_{14} | — | May 9, 2004 | Kitt Peak | Spacewatch | EOS | 2.2 km | MPC · JPL |
| 472158 | 2014 DB_{15} | — | January 29, 2009 | Kitt Peak | Spacewatch | · | 1.6 km | MPC · JPL |
| 472159 | 2014 DQ_{18} | — | November 20, 2000 | Socorro | LINEAR | (5) | 1.3 km | MPC · JPL |
| 472160 | 2014 DK_{19} | — | October 26, 2008 | Kitt Peak | Spacewatch | · | 1.7 km | MPC · JPL |
| 472161 | 2014 DC_{23} | — | September 3, 2008 | Kitt Peak | Spacewatch | (5) | 1.2 km | MPC · JPL |
| 472162 | 2014 DQ_{23} | — | January 11, 2008 | Kitt Peak | Spacewatch | · | 4.2 km | MPC · JPL |
| 472163 | 2014 DP_{24} | — | April 26, 2010 | WISE | WISE | · | 4.3 km | MPC · JPL |
| 472164 | 2014 DU_{25} | — | April 6, 2010 | Mount Lemmon | Mount Lemmon Survey | · | 1.3 km | MPC · JPL |
| 472165 | 2014 DW_{26} | — | July 29, 2005 | Palomar | NEAT | · | 3.5 km | MPC · JPL |
| 472166 | 2014 DJ_{29} | — | September 21, 2008 | Mount Lemmon | Mount Lemmon Survey | EUN | 1.2 km | MPC · JPL |
| 472167 | 2014 DA_{38} | — | February 9, 2008 | Mount Lemmon | Mount Lemmon Survey | · | 2.9 km | MPC · JPL |
| 472168 | 2014 DF_{38} | — | September 17, 1995 | Kitt Peak | Spacewatch | EOS | 2.0 km | MPC · JPL |
| 472169 | 2014 DK_{40} | — | December 30, 2013 | Mount Lemmon | Mount Lemmon Survey | · | 2.0 km | MPC · JPL |
| 472170 | 2014 DN_{42} | — | February 2, 2005 | Kitt Peak | Spacewatch | · | 1.6 km | MPC · JPL |
| 472171 | 2014 DV_{42} | — | September 18, 2006 | Kitt Peak | Spacewatch | · | 2.4 km | MPC · JPL |
| 472172 | 2014 DM_{50} | — | April 10, 2010 | Mount Lemmon | Mount Lemmon Survey | · | 1.6 km | MPC · JPL |
| 472173 | 2014 DC_{55} | — | September 14, 2006 | Kitt Peak | Spacewatch | EOS | 1.7 km | MPC · JPL |
| 472174 | 2014 DG_{63} | — | January 1, 2003 | Socorro | LINEAR | · | 3.2 km | MPC · JPL |
| 472175 | 2014 DC_{64} | — | April 4, 2005 | Mount Lemmon | Mount Lemmon Survey | · | 1.9 km | MPC · JPL |
| 472176 | 2014 DL_{83} | — | January 1, 2008 | Kitt Peak | Spacewatch | THM | 2.1 km | MPC · JPL |
| 472177 | 2014 DJ_{85} | — | February 14, 2002 | Kitt Peak | Spacewatch | · | 1.1 km | MPC · JPL |
| 472178 | 2014 DD_{91} | — | November 6, 2007 | Kitt Peak | Spacewatch | KOR | 1.5 km | MPC · JPL |
| 472179 | 2014 DK_{91} | — | October 1, 2005 | Mount Lemmon | Mount Lemmon Survey | · | 2.6 km | MPC · JPL |
| 472180 | 2014 DT_{97} | — | August 31, 2005 | Kitt Peak | Spacewatch | · | 5.4 km | MPC · JPL |
| 472181 | 2014 DC_{103} | — | May 21, 2010 | WISE | WISE | · | 4.3 km | MPC · JPL |
| 472182 | 2014 DB_{104} | — | August 21, 2006 | Kitt Peak | Spacewatch | · | 2.5 km | MPC · JPL |
| 472183 | 2014 DX_{104} | — | November 23, 2003 | Kitt Peak | Spacewatch | MRX | 970 m | MPC · JPL |
| 472184 | 2014 DF_{105} | — | October 26, 1995 | Kitt Peak | Spacewatch | (5) | 1.4 km | MPC · JPL |
| 472185 | 2014 DB_{106} | — | September 22, 2003 | Kitt Peak | Spacewatch | · | 1.5 km | MPC · JPL |
| 472186 | 2014 DW_{108} | — | February 28, 2000 | Kitt Peak | Spacewatch | · | 2.1 km | MPC · JPL |
| 472187 | 2014 DT_{111} | — | December 18, 2004 | Mount Lemmon | Mount Lemmon Survey | MIS | 2.3 km | MPC · JPL |
| 472188 | 2014 DG_{116} | — | November 23, 1997 | Kitt Peak | Spacewatch | KOR | 1.4 km | MPC · JPL |
| 472189 | 2014 DU_{123} | — | January 13, 2005 | Kitt Peak | Spacewatch | · | 1.2 km | MPC · JPL |
| 472190 | 2014 DR_{128} | — | September 12, 2007 | Mount Lemmon | Mount Lemmon Survey | · | 1.6 km | MPC · JPL |
| 472191 | 2014 DW_{128} | — | October 6, 2008 | Mount Lemmon | Mount Lemmon Survey | · | 1.2 km | MPC · JPL |
| 472192 | 2014 DW_{129} | — | February 12, 2008 | Mount Lemmon | Mount Lemmon Survey | · | 2.9 km | MPC · JPL |
| 472193 | 2014 DK_{130} | — | October 10, 2007 | Kitt Peak | Spacewatch | KOR | 1.3 km | MPC · JPL |
| 472194 | 2014 DC_{131} | — | March 14, 2010 | WISE | WISE | · | 2.5 km | MPC · JPL |
| 472195 | 2014 DK_{133} | — | October 10, 2007 | Mount Lemmon | Mount Lemmon Survey | · | 2.6 km | MPC · JPL |
| 472196 | 2014 DE_{142} | — | October 7, 1996 | Kitt Peak | Spacewatch | · | 1.2 km | MPC · JPL |
| 472197 | 2014 EG | — | August 19, 2006 | Kitt Peak | Spacewatch | · | 2.7 km | MPC · JPL |
| 472198 | 2014 EQ_{6} | — | September 18, 2011 | Mount Lemmon | Mount Lemmon Survey | · | 2.0 km | MPC · JPL |
| 472199 | 2014 EH_{8} | — | February 26, 2003 | Campo Imperatore | CINEOS | · | 2.7 km | MPC · JPL |
| 472200 | 2014 EJ_{8} | — | January 14, 2008 | Kitt Peak | Spacewatch | EOS | 1.8 km | MPC · JPL |

== 472201–472300 ==
back to top

| Designation | | | Discovery | | | Properties | | Ref |
| Permanent | Provisional | Named after | Date | Site | Discoverer(s) | Category | Diam. | Ref |
|---|---|---|---|---|---|---|---|---|
| 472201 | 2014 EK_{10} | — | August 27, 2006 | Kitt Peak | Spacewatch | EMA | 3.1 km | MPC · JPL |
| 472202 | 2014 EU_{10} | — | December 18, 2007 | Mount Lemmon | Mount Lemmon Survey | · | 2.6 km | MPC · JPL |
| 472203 | 2014 EX_{13} | — | December 21, 2008 | Mount Lemmon | Mount Lemmon Survey | · | 1.5 km | MPC · JPL |
| 472204 | 2014 EY_{15} | — | November 18, 2007 | Mount Lemmon | Mount Lemmon Survey | · | 1.3 km | MPC · JPL |
| 472205 | 2014 EJ_{17} | — | October 20, 2003 | Kitt Peak | Spacewatch | · | 1.6 km | MPC · JPL |
| 472206 | 2014 EQ_{17} | — | January 16, 2008 | Kitt Peak | Spacewatch | HYG | 2.8 km | MPC · JPL |
| 472207 | 2014 EU_{20} | — | February 20, 2006 | Catalina | CSS | · | 1.4 km | MPC · JPL |
| 472208 | 2014 EY_{21} | — | May 15, 2010 | WISE | WISE | · | 3.6 km | MPC · JPL |
| 472209 | 2014 EE_{22} | — | January 1, 2009 | Kitt Peak | Spacewatch | · | 1.7 km | MPC · JPL |
| 472210 | 2014 EJ_{22} | — | June 27, 2011 | Mount Lemmon | Mount Lemmon Survey | · | 3.2 km | MPC · JPL |
| 472211 | 2014 EL_{26} | — | December 4, 2010 | Mount Lemmon | Mount Lemmon Survey | L4 | 7.7 km | MPC · JPL |
| 472212 | 2014 EM_{29} | — | December 3, 2012 | Mount Lemmon | Mount Lemmon Survey | · | 1.9 km | MPC · JPL |
| 472213 | 2014 EM_{38} | — | February 13, 2004 | Kitt Peak | Spacewatch | · | 2.2 km | MPC · JPL |
| 472214 | 2014 EF_{39} | — | September 20, 2007 | Kitt Peak | Spacewatch | · | 2.3 km | MPC · JPL |
| 472215 | 2014 EH_{39} | — | February 8, 2008 | Mount Lemmon | Mount Lemmon Survey | · | 3.3 km | MPC · JPL |
| 472216 | 2014 EH_{46} | — | October 12, 2007 | Kitt Peak | Spacewatch | · | 2.5 km | MPC · JPL |
| 472217 | 2014 EH_{47} | — | February 20, 2009 | Mount Lemmon | Mount Lemmon Survey | · | 2.2 km | MPC · JPL |
| 472218 | 2014 EA_{48} | — | March 2, 2009 | Mount Lemmon | Mount Lemmon Survey | · | 1.8 km | MPC · JPL |
| 472219 | 2014 FB | — | July 16, 2004 | Siding Spring | SSS | H | 650 m | MPC · JPL |
| 472220 | 2014 FB_{3} | — | November 16, 2006 | Kitt Peak | Spacewatch | EOS | 2.0 km | MPC · JPL |
| 472221 | 2014 FK_{4} | — | November 16, 2006 | Kitt Peak | Spacewatch | · | 2.4 km | MPC · JPL |
| 472222 | 2014 FN_{4} | — | November 26, 2012 | Mount Lemmon | Mount Lemmon Survey | · | 1.8 km | MPC · JPL |
| 472223 | 2014 FV_{45} | — | January 10, 2008 | Mount Lemmon | Mount Lemmon Survey | · | 2.6 km | MPC · JPL |
| 472224 | 2014 FR_{49} | — | September 28, 2006 | Catalina | CSS | EOS | 2.9 km | MPC · JPL |
| 472225 | 2014 FD_{51} | — | April 4, 2003 | Kitt Peak | Spacewatch | VER | 2.5 km | MPC · JPL |
| 472226 | 2014 FU_{53} | — | February 3, 2008 | Kitt Peak | Spacewatch | VER | 2.5 km | MPC · JPL |
| 472227 | 2014 FF_{64} | — | October 16, 2012 | Catalina | CSS | EUN | 1.6 km | MPC · JPL |
| 472228 | 2014 FL_{64} | — | June 17, 2010 | WISE | WISE | CYB | 5.0 km | MPC · JPL |
| 472229 | 2014 FD_{66} | — | September 26, 2003 | Desert Eagle | W. K. Y. Yeung | · | 2.1 km | MPC · JPL |
| 472230 | 2014 FG_{66} | — | November 20, 2007 | Mount Lemmon | Mount Lemmon Survey | · | 3.5 km | MPC · JPL |
| 472231 | 2014 FU_{71} | — | March 28, 2014 | Cerro Tololo | S. S. Sheppard, C. A. Trujillo | cubewano (cold) | 244 km | MPC · JPL |
| 472232 | 2014 FW_{71} | — | March 27, 2014 | Cerro Tololo | C. A. Trujillo, S. S. Sheppard | cubewano (hot) | 302 km | MPC · JPL |
| 472233 | 2014 GG_{32} | — | December 5, 2007 | Kitt Peak | Spacewatch | · | 3.9 km | MPC · JPL |
| 472234 | 2014 GA_{41} | — | February 2, 2008 | Mount Lemmon | Mount Lemmon Survey | EOS | 1.5 km | MPC · JPL |
| 472235 Zhulong | 2014 GE_{45} | Zhulong | April 9, 2011 | La Silla | D. L. Rabinowitz | res · 2:5 | 188 km | MPC · JPL |
| 472236 | 2014 HF_{12} | — | August 29, 2006 | Catalina | CSS | · | 2.4 km | MPC · JPL |
| 472237 | 2014 HE_{43} | — | October 25, 2011 | XuYi | PMO NEO Survey Program | · | 3.8 km | MPC · JPL |
| 472238 | 2014 HZ_{77} | — | August 27, 2006 | Kitt Peak | Spacewatch | · | 2.0 km | MPC · JPL |
| 472239 | 2014 HS_{119} | — | February 7, 2002 | Kitt Peak | Spacewatch | · | 2.8 km | MPC · JPL |
| 472240 | 2014 HM_{141} | — | March 21, 2009 | Mount Lemmon | Mount Lemmon Survey | · | 2.2 km | MPC · JPL |
| 472241 | 2014 HH_{146} | — | September 18, 2011 | Mount Lemmon | Mount Lemmon Survey | EOS | 1.9 km | MPC · JPL |
| 472242 | 2014 JO_{69} | — | September 30, 2005 | Kitt Peak | Spacewatch | · | 3.3 km | MPC · JPL |
| 472243 | 2014 KJ_{2} | — | November 5, 2005 | Catalina | CSS | · | 620 m | MPC · JPL |
| 472244 | 2014 KY_{9} | — | September 30, 2006 | Catalina | CSS | · | 1.6 km | MPC · JPL |
| 472245 | 2014 KE_{78} | — | May 28, 2004 | Kitt Peak | Spacewatch | H | 490 m | MPC · JPL |
| 472246 | 2014 LF_{10} | — | August 29, 2005 | Kitt Peak | Spacewatch | · | 2.3 km | MPC · JPL |
| 472247 | 2014 LH_{18} | — | January 15, 2008 | Mount Lemmon | Mount Lemmon Survey | · | 1.8 km | MPC · JPL |
| 472248 | 2014 MH_{19} | — | December 10, 2010 | Mount Lemmon | Mount Lemmon Survey | H | 400 m | MPC · JPL |
| 472249 | 2014 MW_{39} | — | December 8, 2010 | Mount Lemmon | Mount Lemmon Survey | · | 3.0 km | MPC · JPL |
| 472250 | 2014 MD_{41} | — | February 7, 2008 | Socorro | LINEAR | T_{j} (2.99) | 4.0 km | MPC · JPL |
| 472251 | 2014 MX_{57} | — | January 2, 2011 | Mount Lemmon | Mount Lemmon Survey | · | 3.3 km | MPC · JPL |
| 472252 | 2014 MP_{58} | — | September 25, 2009 | Catalina | CSS | · | 2.9 km | MPC · JPL |
| 472253 | 2014 NA | — | January 21, 2001 | Socorro | LINEAR | · | 440 m | MPC · JPL |
| 472254 | 2014 OH_{49} | — | September 27, 2009 | Mount Lemmon | Mount Lemmon Survey | · | 2.6 km | MPC · JPL |
| 472255 | 2014 ON_{69} | — | December 5, 1999 | Kitt Peak | Spacewatch | · | 3.2 km | MPC · JPL |
| 472256 | 2014 OM_{108} | — | December 1, 2006 | Mount Lemmon | Mount Lemmon Survey | AGN | 1.3 km | MPC · JPL |
| 472257 | 2014 OG_{208} | — | November 1, 1999 | Kitt Peak | Spacewatch | · | 2.2 km | MPC · JPL |
| 472258 | 2014 OP_{222} | — | January 17, 2007 | Catalina | CSS | BRA | 1.4 km | MPC · JPL |
| 472259 | 2014 PU_{5} | — | November 30, 2005 | Kitt Peak | Spacewatch | · | 3.4 km | MPC · JPL |
| 472260 | 2014 QR_{169} | — | August 6, 2014 | Kitt Peak | Spacewatch | H | 440 m | MPC · JPL |
| 472261 | 2014 QH_{364} | — | February 12, 2011 | Catalina | CSS | · | 390 m | MPC · JPL |
| 472262 | 2014 QN_{441} | — | August 18, 2014 | Cerro Tololo | DECam | other TNO | 170 km | MPC · JPL |
| 472263 | 2014 RP_{12} | — | September 6, 2014 | SONEAR | SONEAR | APO | 770 m | MPC · JPL |
| 472264 | 2014 SF_{128} | — | March 15, 2010 | Kitt Peak | Spacewatch | · | 940 m | MPC · JPL |
| 472265 | 2014 SR_{303} | — | September 19, 2014 | Haleakala | Pan-STARRS 1 | centaur | 30 km | MPC · JPL |
| 472266 | 2014 SR_{338} | — | November 12, 2001 | Socorro | LINEAR | · | 2.3 km | MPC · JPL |
| 472267 | 2014 TC_{34} | — | October 27, 2006 | Catalina | CSS | H | 630 m | MPC · JPL |
| 472268 | 2014 TN_{35} | — | October 23, 1998 | Kitt Peak | Spacewatch | H | 370 m | MPC · JPL |
| 472269 | 2014 TF_{49} | — | February 13, 2008 | Kitt Peak | Spacewatch | · | 3.5 km | MPC · JPL |
| 472270 | 2014 UJ_{1} | — | April 17, 2009 | Catalina | CSS | V | 850 m | MPC · JPL |
| 472271 | 2014 UM_{33} | — | October 7, 2010 | Haleakala | Pan-STARRS 1 | cubewano (hot) | 493 km | MPC · JPL |
| 472272 | 2014 UY_{34} | — | November 19, 2009 | Catalina | CSS | H | 480 m | MPC · JPL |
| 472273 | 2014 UK_{51} | — | April 29, 2003 | Kitt Peak | Spacewatch | · | 770 m | MPC · JPL |
| 472274 | 2014 UC_{84} | — | November 4, 2004 | Kitt Peak | Spacewatch | · | 780 m | MPC · JPL |
| 472275 | 2014 UG_{116} | — | October 16, 2009 | Mount Lemmon | Mount Lemmon Survey | H | 640 m | MPC · JPL |
| 472276 | 2014 UN_{132} | — | December 30, 2005 | Mount Lemmon | Mount Lemmon Survey | · | 2.7 km | MPC · JPL |
| 472277 | 2014 UO_{140} | — | January 8, 2003 | Socorro | LINEAR | (5) | 1.1 km | MPC · JPL |
| 472278 | 2014 UB_{170} | — | November 25, 2006 | Mount Lemmon | Mount Lemmon Survey | · | 1.8 km | MPC · JPL |
| 472279 | 2014 UW_{192} | — | November 28, 2010 | Mount Lemmon | Mount Lemmon Survey | · | 2.5 km | MPC · JPL |
| 472280 | 2014 UY_{197} | — | January 1, 2009 | Kitt Peak | Spacewatch | · | 750 m | MPC · JPL |
| 472281 | 2014 UG_{209} | — | April 24, 2003 | Kitt Peak | Spacewatch | · | 2.6 km | MPC · JPL |
| 472282 | 2014 VW_{10} | — | May 5, 2010 | WISE | WISE | · | 3.8 km | MPC · JPL |
| 472283 | 2014 WK_{4} | — | September 11, 2010 | Kitt Peak | Spacewatch | V | 680 m | MPC · JPL |
| 472284 | 2014 WP_{49} | — | March 3, 2005 | Catalina | CSS | · | 640 m | MPC · JPL |
| 472285 | 2014 WW_{62} | — | November 15, 2001 | Kitt Peak | Spacewatch | · | 570 m | MPC · JPL |
| 472286 | 2014 WQ_{71} | — | February 29, 2012 | Kitt Peak | Spacewatch | · | 1.1 km | MPC · JPL |
| 472287 | 2014 WU_{119} | — | May 14, 2013 | Siding Spring | SSS | H | 700 m | MPC · JPL |
| 472288 | 2014 WT_{120} | — | October 15, 2006 | Kitt Peak | Spacewatch | H | 510 m | MPC · JPL |
| 472289 | 2014 WM_{124} | — | October 11, 2007 | Kitt Peak | Spacewatch | · | 720 m | MPC · JPL |
| 472290 | 2014 WT_{165} | — | October 19, 2006 | Mount Lemmon | Mount Lemmon Survey | · | 1.6 km | MPC · JPL |
| 472291 | 2014 WG_{195} | — | January 16, 2005 | Kitt Peak | Spacewatch | · | 3.6 km | MPC · JPL |
| 472292 | 2014 WK_{205} | — | April 29, 2010 | WISE | WISE | · | 2.4 km | MPC · JPL |
| 472293 | 2014 WX_{353} | — | May 9, 2005 | Kitt Peak | Spacewatch | · | 4.2 km | MPC · JPL |
| 472294 | 2014 WB_{355} | — | May 12, 2007 | Mount Lemmon | Mount Lemmon Survey | EUN | 1.6 km | MPC · JPL |
| 472295 | 2014 WW_{362} | — | June 3, 2003 | Kitt Peak | Spacewatch | H | 390 m | MPC · JPL |
| 472296 | 2014 WP_{389} | — | October 8, 2007 | Catalina | CSS | · | 1.2 km | MPC · JPL |
| 472297 | 2014 WR_{389} | — | December 19, 2003 | Socorro | LINEAR | · | 1.1 km | MPC · JPL |
| 472298 | 2014 WP_{393} | — | January 13, 2002 | Socorro | LINEAR | · | 2.1 km | MPC · JPL |
| 472299 | 2014 WC_{428} | — | September 29, 2003 | Socorro | LINEAR | PHO | 1.4 km | MPC · JPL |
| 472300 | 2014 WN_{429} | — | November 4, 2007 | Kitt Peak | Spacewatch | · | 4.1 km | MPC · JPL |

== 472301–472400 ==
back to top

| Designation | | | Discovery | | | Properties | | Ref |
| Permanent | Provisional | Named after | Date | Site | Discoverer(s) | Category | Diam. | Ref |
|---|---|---|---|---|---|---|---|---|
| 472301 | 2014 WY_{480} | — | November 2, 2013 | Catalina | CSS | · | 2.6 km | MPC · JPL |
| 472302 | 2014 WO_{481} | — | January 8, 2006 | Mount Lemmon | Mount Lemmon Survey | · | 2.1 km | MPC · JPL |
| 472303 | 2014 WK_{493} | — | December 7, 2005 | Kitt Peak | Spacewatch | · | 2.0 km | MPC · JPL |
| 472304 | 2014 WP_{493} | — | October 25, 2008 | Kitt Peak | Spacewatch | · | 3.7 km | MPC · JPL |
| 472305 | 2014 WH_{495} | — | January 18, 2010 | WISE | WISE | · | 4.4 km | MPC · JPL |
| 472306 | 2014 WG_{496} | — | November 11, 2009 | Mount Lemmon | Mount Lemmon Survey | · | 1.9 km | MPC · JPL |
| 472307 | 2014 WC_{499} | — | October 23, 2006 | Catalina | CSS | H | 710 m | MPC · JPL |
| 472308 | 2014 XN_{9} | — | October 29, 2006 | Catalina | CSS | H | 660 m | MPC · JPL |
| 472309 | 2014 XM_{14} | — | April 18, 2009 | Kitt Peak | Spacewatch | · | 770 m | MPC · JPL |
| 472310 | 2014 YP_{4} | — | February 8, 2002 | Kitt Peak | Spacewatch | · | 1.6 km | MPC · JPL |
| 472311 | 2014 YK_{6} | — | December 18, 2004 | Mount Lemmon | Mount Lemmon Survey | · | 1.0 km | MPC · JPL |
| 472312 | 2014 YO_{6} | — | July 3, 2005 | Mount Lemmon | Mount Lemmon Survey | · | 1.4 km | MPC · JPL |
| 472313 | 2014 YV_{6} | — | January 8, 2010 | Mount Lemmon | Mount Lemmon Survey | · | 4.1 km | MPC · JPL |
| 472314 | 2014 YV_{8} | — | January 6, 2010 | Kitt Peak | Spacewatch | H | 520 m | MPC · JPL |
| 472315 | 2014 YA_{10} | — | December 11, 2002 | Kitt Peak | Spacewatch | · | 1.8 km | MPC · JPL |
| 472316 | 2014 YD_{10} | — | February 17, 2010 | Catalina | CSS | · | 2.6 km | MPC · JPL |
| 472317 | 2014 YR_{21} | — | January 9, 2002 | Socorro | LINEAR | H | 550 m | MPC · JPL |
| 472318 | 2014 YR_{28} | — | June 12, 2005 | Kitt Peak | Spacewatch | H | 720 m | MPC · JPL |
| 472319 | 2014 YT_{32} | — | December 11, 2004 | Kitt Peak | Spacewatch | · | 890 m | MPC · JPL |
| 472320 | 2014 YO_{35} | — | December 3, 2004 | Kitt Peak | Spacewatch | · | 850 m | MPC · JPL |
| 472321 | 2014 YT_{43} | — | January 16, 2005 | Catalina | CSS | H | 570 m | MPC · JPL |
| 472322 | 2014 YB_{44} | — | March 13, 2010 | Mount Lemmon | Mount Lemmon Survey | H | 410 m | MPC · JPL |
| 472323 | 2014 YF_{45} | — | February 13, 2008 | Catalina | CSS | PHO | 3.4 km | MPC · JPL |
| 472324 | 2014 YA_{47} | — | February 10, 2002 | Socorro | LINEAR | H | 600 m | MPC · JPL |
| 472325 | 2015 AU_{56} | — | October 15, 2007 | Mount Lemmon | Mount Lemmon Survey | · | 990 m | MPC · JPL |
| 472326 | 2015 AP_{76} | — | December 8, 2010 | Mount Lemmon | Mount Lemmon Survey | KON | 2.3 km | MPC · JPL |
| 472327 | 2015 AJ_{139} | — | March 2, 2000 | Kitt Peak | Spacewatch | · | 1.1 km | MPC · JPL |
| 472328 | 2015 AF_{149} | — | October 5, 2005 | Mount Lemmon | Mount Lemmon Survey | · | 1.4 km | MPC · JPL |
| 472329 | 2015 AS_{165} | — | January 30, 2011 | Mount Lemmon | Mount Lemmon Survey | · | 1.2 km | MPC · JPL |
| 472330 | 2015 AY_{170} | — | December 26, 2009 | Kitt Peak | Spacewatch | · | 4.1 km | MPC · JPL |
| 472331 | 2015 AM_{203} | — | August 26, 2008 | Siding Spring | SSS | · | 1.5 km | MPC · JPL |
| 472332 | 2015 AV_{205} | — | December 19, 2007 | Kitt Peak | Spacewatch | (2076) | 920 m | MPC · JPL |
| 472333 | 2015 AS_{222} | — | August 25, 2012 | Catalina | CSS | · | 4.4 km | MPC · JPL |
| 472334 | 2015 AS_{224} | — | September 3, 2005 | Catalina | CSS | · | 2.0 km | MPC · JPL |
| 472335 | 2015 AU_{229} | — | January 5, 2006 | Kitt Peak | Spacewatch | EUN | 1.3 km | MPC · JPL |
| 472336 | 2015 AF_{230} | — | January 18, 2002 | Cima Ekar | ADAS | · | 2.2 km | MPC · JPL |
| 472337 | 2015 AO_{239} | — | May 12, 2007 | Kitt Peak | Spacewatch | · | 1.9 km | MPC · JPL |
| 472338 | 2015 AN_{241} | — | May 21, 2012 | Mount Lemmon | Mount Lemmon Survey | · | 2.0 km | MPC · JPL |
| 472339 | 2015 AR_{241} | — | August 14, 2012 | Kitt Peak | Spacewatch | · | 1.7 km | MPC · JPL |
| 472340 | 2015 AC_{245} | — | March 21, 2007 | Mount Lemmon | Mount Lemmon Survey | · | 1.9 km | MPC · JPL |
| 472341 | 2015 AO_{245} | — | January 9, 2006 | Kitt Peak | Spacewatch | · | 1.7 km | MPC · JPL |
| 472342 | 2015 AC_{248} | — | April 14, 2005 | Catalina | CSS | PHO | 810 m | MPC · JPL |
| 472343 | 2015 AE_{254} | — | March 29, 2003 | Kitt Peak | Spacewatch | · | 1.2 km | MPC · JPL |
| 472344 | 2015 AE_{261} | — | March 15, 2005 | Mount Lemmon | Mount Lemmon Survey | · | 3.3 km | MPC · JPL |
| 472345 | 2015 AA_{263} | — | December 14, 2010 | Mount Lemmon | Mount Lemmon Survey | · | 1.1 km | MPC · JPL |
| 472346 | 2015 AS_{274} | — | January 10, 2008 | Mount Lemmon | Mount Lemmon Survey | NYS | 660 m | MPC · JPL |
| 472347 | 2015 AP_{275} | — | January 2, 2012 | Mount Lemmon | Mount Lemmon Survey | · | 670 m | MPC · JPL |
| 472348 | 2015 BU | — | March 31, 2009 | Kitt Peak | Spacewatch | · | 700 m | MPC · JPL |
| 472349 | 2015 BM_{2} | — | June 14, 2004 | Kitt Peak | Spacewatch | · | 1.8 km | MPC · JPL |
| 472350 | 2015 BR_{6} | — | July 23, 2010 | WISE | WISE | PHO | 2.8 km | MPC · JPL |
| 472351 | 2015 BH_{11} | — | October 8, 2007 | Mount Lemmon | Mount Lemmon Survey | · | 660 m | MPC · JPL |
| 472352 | 2015 BR_{17} | — | November 19, 2009 | Mount Lemmon | Mount Lemmon Survey | · | 1.6 km | MPC · JPL |
| 472353 | 2015 BF_{18} | — | March 18, 2004 | Siding Spring | SSS | · | 4.7 km | MPC · JPL |
| 472354 | 2015 BS_{24} | — | September 21, 2008 | Catalina | CSS | · | 2.4 km | MPC · JPL |
| 472355 | 2015 BV_{26} | — | February 16, 2001 | Kitt Peak | Spacewatch | · | 3.4 km | MPC · JPL |
| 472356 | 2015 BR_{28} | — | February 12, 2004 | Kitt Peak | Spacewatch | H | 400 m | MPC · JPL |
| 472357 | 2015 BT_{28} | — | January 30, 2004 | Kitt Peak | Spacewatch | · | 2.6 km | MPC · JPL |
| 472358 | 2015 BL_{29} | — | May 9, 2007 | Kitt Peak | Spacewatch | · | 1.6 km | MPC · JPL |
| 472359 | 2015 BF_{30} | — | January 30, 2010 | WISE | WISE | THB | 2.4 km | MPC · JPL |
| 472360 | 2015 BG_{30} | — | October 26, 2008 | Kitt Peak | Spacewatch | · | 2.8 km | MPC · JPL |
| 472361 | 2015 BN_{30} | — | March 11, 2005 | Mount Lemmon | Mount Lemmon Survey | · | 3.4 km | MPC · JPL |
| 472362 | 2015 BW_{30} | — | April 23, 2004 | Campo Imperatore | CINEOS | · | 1.1 km | MPC · JPL |
| 472363 | 2015 BX_{30} | — | January 28, 2011 | Kitt Peak | Spacewatch | EUN | 1.4 km | MPC · JPL |
| 472364 | 2015 BJ_{31} | — | September 15, 2004 | Kitt Peak | Spacewatch | · | 2.6 km | MPC · JPL |
| 472365 | 2015 BZ_{32} | — | November 13, 2010 | Mount Lemmon | Mount Lemmon Survey | V | 570 m | MPC · JPL |
| 472366 | 2015 BJ_{34} | — | May 6, 2006 | Mount Lemmon | Mount Lemmon Survey | · | 660 m | MPC · JPL |
| 472367 | 2015 BQ_{35} | — | December 7, 2013 | Mount Lemmon | Mount Lemmon Survey | EUN | 1.9 km | MPC · JPL |
| 472368 | 2015 BZ_{36} | — | June 27, 2005 | Kitt Peak | Spacewatch | · | 4.4 km | MPC · JPL |
| 472369 | 2015 BN_{58} | — | May 29, 2011 | Kitt Peak | Spacewatch | · | 2.0 km | MPC · JPL |
| 472370 | 2015 BX_{59} | — | March 31, 2011 | Mount Lemmon | Mount Lemmon Survey | · | 2.6 km | MPC · JPL |
| 472371 | 2015 BD_{60} | — | April 17, 2009 | Catalina | CSS | · | 820 m | MPC · JPL |
| 472372 | 2015 BD_{63} | — | November 10, 2010 | Mount Lemmon | Mount Lemmon Survey | (2076) | 960 m | MPC · JPL |
| 472373 | 2015 BC_{65} | — | July 8, 2003 | Palomar | NEAT | · | 2.1 km | MPC · JPL |
| 472374 | 2015 BV_{65} | — | April 6, 2011 | Mount Lemmon | Mount Lemmon Survey | · | 2.0 km | MPC · JPL |
| 472375 | 2015 BA_{66} | — | February 9, 2008 | Kitt Peak | Spacewatch | NYS | 1.0 km | MPC · JPL |
| 472376 | 2015 BO_{71} | — | September 18, 2009 | Catalina | CSS | · | 1.5 km | MPC · JPL |
| 472377 | 2015 BL_{72} | — | July 25, 2008 | Mount Lemmon | Mount Lemmon Survey | H | 630 m | MPC · JPL |
| 472378 | 2015 BM_{72} | — | July 3, 2003 | Kitt Peak | Spacewatch | · | 1.7 km | MPC · JPL |
| 472379 | 2015 BM_{88} | — | January 13, 2005 | Kitt Peak | Spacewatch | · | 900 m | MPC · JPL |
| 472380 | 2015 BC_{89} | — | February 2, 1997 | Kitt Peak | Spacewatch | · | 910 m | MPC · JPL |
| 472381 | 2015 BW_{90} | — | September 3, 2008 | Kitt Peak | Spacewatch | AGN | 1.3 km | MPC · JPL |
| 472382 | 2015 BN_{92} | — | June 15, 2013 | Mount Lemmon | Mount Lemmon Survey | H | 540 m | MPC · JPL |
| 472383 | 2015 BX_{93} | — | March 16, 2010 | Kitt Peak | Spacewatch | · | 3.1 km | MPC · JPL |
| 472384 | 2015 BE_{100} | — | January 28, 2006 | Mount Lemmon | Mount Lemmon Survey | · | 2.2 km | MPC · JPL |
| 472385 | 2015 BY_{100} | — | February 23, 2007 | Mount Lemmon | Mount Lemmon Survey | · | 1.4 km | MPC · JPL |
| 472386 | 2015 BZ_{101} | — | February 16, 2004 | Socorro | LINEAR | · | 1.3 km | MPC · JPL |
| 472387 | 2015 BH_{104} | — | February 6, 2010 | WISE | WISE | · | 2.1 km | MPC · JPL |
| 472388 | 2015 BZ_{122} | — | April 1, 2009 | Kitt Peak | Spacewatch | · | 650 m | MPC · JPL |
| 472389 | 2015 BF_{130} | — | December 11, 2010 | Mount Lemmon | Mount Lemmon Survey | · | 1.2 km | MPC · JPL |
| 472390 | 2015 BS_{130} | — | January 23, 2006 | Mount Lemmon | Mount Lemmon Survey | · | 2.3 km | MPC · JPL |
| 472391 | 2015 BU_{132} | — | April 20, 2004 | Desert Eagle | W. K. Y. Yeung | · | 1.1 km | MPC · JPL |
| 472392 | 2015 BK_{139} | — | January 15, 2008 | Mount Lemmon | Mount Lemmon Survey | · | 600 m | MPC · JPL |
| 472393 | 2015 BQ_{143} | — | April 1, 2009 | Kitt Peak | Spacewatch | · | 670 m | MPC · JPL |
| 472394 | 2015 BU_{143} | — | May 16, 2010 | WISE | WISE | · | 2.9 km | MPC · JPL |
| 472395 | 2015 BZ_{146} | — | February 26, 2011 | Mount Lemmon | Mount Lemmon Survey | MIS | 2.8 km | MPC · JPL |
| 472396 | 2015 BE_{157} | — | February 2, 2006 | Kitt Peak | Spacewatch | DOR | 2.4 km | MPC · JPL |
| 472397 | 2015 BY_{158} | — | March 6, 2008 | Mount Lemmon | Mount Lemmon Survey | · | 1.1 km | MPC · JPL |
| 472398 | 2015 BD_{184} | — | November 23, 1995 | Kitt Peak | Spacewatch | · | 2.0 km | MPC · JPL |
| 472399 | 2015 BQ_{186} | — | March 16, 2005 | Mount Lemmon | Mount Lemmon Survey | · | 770 m | MPC · JPL |
| 472400 | 2015 BW_{193} | — | February 9, 2008 | Mount Lemmon | Mount Lemmon Survey | · | 740 m | MPC · JPL |

== 472401–472500 ==
back to top

| Designation | | | Discovery | | | Properties | | Ref |
| Permanent | Provisional | Named after | Date | Site | Discoverer(s) | Category | Diam. | Ref |
|---|---|---|---|---|---|---|---|---|
| 472401 | 2015 BC_{196} | — | April 6, 2008 | Kitt Peak | Spacewatch | · | 1.3 km | MPC · JPL |
| 472402 | 2015 BO_{197} | — | February 9, 2008 | Mount Lemmon | Mount Lemmon Survey | · | 810 m | MPC · JPL |
| 472403 | 2015 BE_{227} | — | October 31, 2007 | Mount Lemmon | Mount Lemmon Survey | · | 660 m | MPC · JPL |
| 472404 | 2015 BP_{240} | — | September 28, 2008 | Mount Lemmon | Mount Lemmon Survey | · | 1.9 km | MPC · JPL |
| 472405 | 2015 BT_{241} | — | January 17, 2005 | Kitt Peak | Spacewatch | · | 940 m | MPC · JPL |
| 472406 | 2015 BM_{242} | — | October 13, 2010 | Mount Lemmon | Mount Lemmon Survey | · | 760 m | MPC · JPL |
| 472407 | 2015 BX_{243} | — | February 26, 2012 | Kitt Peak | Spacewatch | · | 630 m | MPC · JPL |
| 472408 | 2015 BC_{244} | — | February 21, 2007 | Kitt Peak | Spacewatch | · | 1 km | MPC · JPL |
| 472409 | 2015 BY_{245} | — | December 30, 2007 | Kitt Peak | Spacewatch | · | 810 m | MPC · JPL |
| 472410 | 2015 BR_{246} | — | December 1, 2003 | Kitt Peak | Spacewatch | · | 880 m | MPC · JPL |
| 472411 | 2015 BE_{250} | — | February 14, 2010 | Mount Lemmon | Mount Lemmon Survey | · | 2.0 km | MPC · JPL |
| 472412 | 2015 BR_{250} | — | September 3, 2008 | Kitt Peak | Spacewatch | · | 1.3 km | MPC · JPL |
| 472413 | 2015 BR_{252} | — | March 4, 2008 | Kitt Peak | Spacewatch | · | 940 m | MPC · JPL |
| 472414 | 2015 BN_{254} | — | December 9, 2010 | Kitt Peak | Spacewatch | · | 1.7 km | MPC · JPL |
| 472415 | 2015 BB_{259} | — | December 21, 2003 | Kitt Peak | Spacewatch | · | 1.2 km | MPC · JPL |
| 472416 | 2015 BD_{261} | — | February 9, 2005 | Mount Lemmon | Mount Lemmon Survey | · | 800 m | MPC · JPL |
| 472417 | 2015 BU_{262} | — | January 7, 2006 | Mount Lemmon | Mount Lemmon Survey | · | 2.2 km | MPC · JPL |
| 472418 | 2015 BV_{262} | — | September 12, 2004 | Kitt Peak | Spacewatch | · | 1.2 km | MPC · JPL |
| 472419 | 2015 BU_{263} | — | November 21, 2006 | Mount Lemmon | Mount Lemmon Survey | · | 1.5 km | MPC · JPL |
| 472420 | 2015 BT_{264} | — | December 10, 2005 | Kitt Peak | Spacewatch | · | 1.3 km | MPC · JPL |
| 472421 | 2015 BV_{268} | — | November 2, 2007 | Kitt Peak | Spacewatch | · | 610 m | MPC · JPL |
| 472422 | 2015 BO_{269} | — | December 2, 2005 | Mount Lemmon | Mount Lemmon Survey | · | 1.8 km | MPC · JPL |
| 472423 | 2015 BB_{273} | — | December 17, 2009 | Mount Lemmon | Mount Lemmon Survey | · | 1.8 km | MPC · JPL |
| 472424 | 2015 BB_{276} | — | October 8, 2012 | Mount Lemmon | Mount Lemmon Survey | EOS | 2.1 km | MPC · JPL |
| 472425 | 2015 BE_{277} | — | September 5, 2013 | Catalina | CSS | · | 1.9 km | MPC · JPL |
| 472426 | 2015 BN_{277} | — | March 15, 2004 | Kitt Peak | Spacewatch | LIX | 3.6 km | MPC · JPL |
| 472427 | 2015 BA_{278} | — | March 13, 2007 | Kitt Peak | Spacewatch | · | 1.6 km | MPC · JPL |
| 472428 | 2015 BU_{278} | — | March 16, 2010 | Mount Lemmon | Mount Lemmon Survey | · | 2.9 km | MPC · JPL |
| 472429 | 2015 BD_{296} | — | March 9, 1997 | Kitt Peak | Spacewatch | · | 1.5 km | MPC · JPL |
| 472430 | 2015 BK_{297} | — | February 10, 2002 | Socorro | LINEAR | · | 1.2 km | MPC · JPL |
| 472431 | 2015 BZ_{297} | — | December 19, 2003 | Socorro | LINEAR | · | 920 m | MPC · JPL |
| 472432 | 2015 BG_{298} | — | February 13, 2004 | Kitt Peak | Spacewatch | H | 610 m | MPC · JPL |
| 472433 | 2015 BK_{299} | — | April 13, 2011 | Catalina | CSS | · | 1.4 km | MPC · JPL |
| 472434 | 2015 BF_{300} | — | February 13, 2004 | Kitt Peak | Spacewatch | · | 940 m | MPC · JPL |
| 472435 | 2015 BJ_{300} | — | April 5, 2008 | Catalina | CSS | V | 900 m | MPC · JPL |
| 472436 | 2015 BW_{300} | — | July 25, 2003 | Palomar | NEAT | EUN | 1.3 km | MPC · JPL |
| 472437 | 2015 BL_{303} | — | May 14, 2005 | Kitt Peak | Spacewatch | · | 3.3 km | MPC · JPL |
| 472438 | 2015 BV_{303} | — | July 3, 2005 | Mount Lemmon | Mount Lemmon Survey | · | 3.4 km | MPC · JPL |
| 472439 | 2015 BV_{304} | — | April 21, 2012 | Mount Lemmon | Mount Lemmon Survey | · | 650 m | MPC · JPL |
| 472440 | 2015 BE_{305} | — | September 6, 2008 | Catalina | CSS | · | 2.8 km | MPC · JPL |
| 472441 | 2015 BO_{306} | — | November 22, 2008 | Kitt Peak | Spacewatch | · | 3.9 km | MPC · JPL |
| 472442 | 2015 BZ_{306} | — | September 18, 2006 | Catalina | CSS | · | 1.3 km | MPC · JPL |
| 472443 | 2015 BM_{312} | — | December 26, 2006 | Kitt Peak | Spacewatch | H | 460 m | MPC · JPL |
| 472444 | 2015 BN_{313} | — | June 5, 2011 | Mount Lemmon | Mount Lemmon Survey | · | 1.9 km | MPC · JPL |
| 472445 | 2015 BK_{318} | — | January 7, 2010 | Mount Lemmon | Mount Lemmon Survey | KOR | 1.2 km | MPC · JPL |
| 472446 | 2015 BY_{318} | — | September 6, 2008 | Mount Lemmon | Mount Lemmon Survey | · | 1.5 km | MPC · JPL |
| 472447 | 2015 BK_{321} | — | March 19, 2007 | Mount Lemmon | Mount Lemmon Survey | · | 1.5 km | MPC · JPL |
| 472448 | 2015 BL_{323} | — | September 19, 2009 | Mount Lemmon | Mount Lemmon Survey | · | 1.1 km | MPC · JPL |
| 472449 | 2015 BV_{325} | — | December 29, 2003 | Kitt Peak | Spacewatch | · | 2.6 km | MPC · JPL |
| 472450 | 2015 BJ_{326} | — | January 18, 2008 | Kitt Peak | Spacewatch | V | 720 m | MPC · JPL |
| 472451 | 2015 BY_{332} | — | November 6, 2010 | Mount Lemmon | Mount Lemmon Survey | · | 760 m | MPC · JPL |
| 472452 | 2015 BO_{350} | — | December 25, 2009 | Kitt Peak | Spacewatch | · | 3.6 km | MPC · JPL |
| 472453 | 2015 BR_{354} | — | July 3, 2005 | Mount Lemmon | Mount Lemmon Survey | · | 950 m | MPC · JPL |
| 472454 | 2015 BF_{356} | — | February 1, 2005 | Kitt Peak | Spacewatch | · | 640 m | MPC · JPL |
| 472455 | 2015 BZ_{388} | — | December 17, 2007 | Kitt Peak | Spacewatch | · | 910 m | MPC · JPL |
| 472456 | 2015 BQ_{390} | — | November 22, 2006 | Kitt Peak | Spacewatch | · | 1.1 km | MPC · JPL |
| 472457 | 2015 BA_{407} | — | October 17, 2010 | Mount Lemmon | Mount Lemmon Survey | · | 580 m | MPC · JPL |
| 472458 | 2015 BJ_{407} | — | April 30, 2012 | Mount Lemmon | Mount Lemmon Survey | EUN | 1.5 km | MPC · JPL |
| 472459 | 2015 BF_{408} | — | February 21, 2007 | Mount Lemmon | Mount Lemmon Survey | · | 980 m | MPC · JPL |
| 472460 | 2015 BU_{413} | — | April 13, 2008 | Kitt Peak | Spacewatch | MAS | 600 m | MPC · JPL |
| 472461 | 2015 BN_{414} | — | April 21, 2006 | Kitt Peak | Spacewatch | · | 720 m | MPC · JPL |
| 472462 | 2015 BD_{415} | — | February 17, 2010 | Mount Lemmon | Mount Lemmon Survey | · | 2.0 km | MPC · JPL |
| 472463 | 2015 BR_{416} | — | April 23, 2011 | Kitt Peak | Spacewatch | · | 2.1 km | MPC · JPL |
| 472464 | 2015 BN_{417} | — | March 9, 2011 | Mount Lemmon | Mount Lemmon Survey | · | 1.2 km | MPC · JPL |
| 472465 | 2015 BW_{422} | — | October 22, 2009 | Mount Lemmon | Mount Lemmon Survey | (5) | 1.1 km | MPC · JPL |
| 472466 | 2015 BJ_{425} | — | February 14, 2010 | Mount Lemmon | Mount Lemmon Survey | · | 1.7 km | MPC · JPL |
| 472467 | 2015 BB_{438} | — | February 5, 2011 | Mount Lemmon | Mount Lemmon Survey | · | 1.3 km | MPC · JPL |
| 472468 | 2015 BZ_{440} | — | July 2, 2011 | Mount Lemmon | Mount Lemmon Survey | · | 2.4 km | MPC · JPL |
| 472469 | 2015 BV_{441} | — | March 11, 2007 | Kitt Peak | Spacewatch | BRG | 1.4 km | MPC · JPL |
| 472470 | 2015 BR_{451} | — | September 15, 2009 | Kitt Peak | Spacewatch | · | 1.4 km | MPC · JPL |
| 472471 | 2015 BL_{459} | — | January 22, 2006 | Mount Lemmon | Mount Lemmon Survey | WIT | 910 m | MPC · JPL |
| 472472 | 2015 BH_{461} | — | February 7, 2008 | Kitt Peak | Spacewatch | · | 1 km | MPC · JPL |
| 472473 | 2015 BJ_{463} | — | September 6, 2008 | Kitt Peak | Spacewatch | · | 1.1 km | MPC · JPL |
| 472474 | 2015 BD_{468} | — | January 20, 2015 | Kitt Peak | Spacewatch | · | 2.8 km | MPC · JPL |
| 472475 | 2015 BF_{468} | — | June 14, 2012 | Mount Lemmon | Mount Lemmon Survey | · | 1.4 km | MPC · JPL |
| 472476 | 2015 BH_{472} | — | September 17, 2006 | Catalina | CSS | · | 910 m | MPC · JPL |
| 472477 | 2015 BP_{482} | — | December 30, 2007 | Kitt Peak | Spacewatch | · | 760 m | MPC · JPL |
| 472478 | 2015 BT_{486} | — | March 21, 2010 | Mount Lemmon | Mount Lemmon Survey | · | 2.1 km | MPC · JPL |
| 472479 | 2015 BK_{491} | — | February 13, 2011 | Mount Lemmon | Mount Lemmon Survey | · | 1.8 km | MPC · JPL |
| 472480 | 2015 BE_{499} | — | January 11, 2008 | Kitt Peak | Spacewatch | · | 730 m | MPC · JPL |
| 472481 | 2015 BZ_{500} | — | March 10, 2008 | Kitt Peak | Spacewatch | · | 1.0 km | MPC · JPL |
| 472482 | 2015 BC_{502} | — | March 27, 2011 | Mount Lemmon | Mount Lemmon Survey | · | 2.4 km | MPC · JPL |
| 472483 | 2015 BK_{512} | — | November 30, 2005 | Kitt Peak | Spacewatch | · | 1.6 km | MPC · JPL |
| 472484 | 2015 BL_{512} | — | October 29, 2005 | Catalina | CSS | · | 1.3 km | MPC · JPL |
| 472485 | 2015 BC_{513} | — | July 1, 2008 | Kitt Peak | Spacewatch | H | 400 m | MPC · JPL |
| 472486 | 2015 CH_{5} | — | January 14, 2002 | Kitt Peak | Spacewatch | · | 1.5 km | MPC · JPL |
| 472487 | 2015 CN_{7} | — | July 11, 2005 | Kitt Peak | Spacewatch | NYS | 1.1 km | MPC · JPL |
| 472488 | 2015 CU_{8} | — | December 9, 1999 | Kitt Peak | Spacewatch | · | 1.3 km | MPC · JPL |
| 472489 | 2015 CF_{9} | — | December 14, 2010 | Mount Lemmon | Mount Lemmon Survey | · | 1.1 km | MPC · JPL |
| 472490 | 2015 CB_{10} | — | February 12, 2004 | Kitt Peak | Spacewatch | · | 3.0 km | MPC · JPL |
| 472491 | 2015 CK_{10} | — | September 1, 2005 | Kitt Peak | Spacewatch | · | 1.4 km | MPC · JPL |
| 472492 | 2015 CL_{11} | — | December 15, 2004 | Kitt Peak | Spacewatch | · | 900 m | MPC · JPL |
| 472493 | 2015 CO_{11} | — | September 25, 2006 | Kitt Peak | Spacewatch | · | 930 m | MPC · JPL |
| 472494 | 2015 CU_{11} | — | March 18, 2004 | Kitt Peak | Spacewatch | · | 1.3 km | MPC · JPL |
| 472495 | 2015 CV_{11} | — | August 26, 2012 | Kitt Peak | Spacewatch | EUN | 1.2 km | MPC · JPL |
| 472496 | 2015 CB_{15} | — | April 4, 2008 | Catalina | CSS | · | 1.3 km | MPC · JPL |
| 472497 | 2015 CC_{17} | — | March 14, 2004 | Socorro | LINEAR | · | 3.5 km | MPC · JPL |
| 472498 | 2015 CH_{20} | — | January 20, 2010 | WISE | WISE | · | 3.8 km | MPC · JPL |
| 472499 | 2015 CN_{21} | — | April 22, 2009 | Mount Lemmon | Mount Lemmon Survey | · | 710 m | MPC · JPL |
| 472500 | 2015 CA_{23} | — | March 17, 1996 | Kitt Peak | Spacewatch | · | 1.4 km | MPC · JPL |

== 472501–472600 ==
back to top

| Designation | | | Discovery | | | Properties | | Ref |
| Permanent | Provisional | Named after | Date | Site | Discoverer(s) | Category | Diam. | Ref |
|---|---|---|---|---|---|---|---|---|
| 472501 | 2015 CR_{23} | — | October 5, 2007 | Kitt Peak | Spacewatch | · | 2.9 km | MPC · JPL |
| 472502 | 2015 CS_{23} | — | March 12, 2010 | Mount Lemmon | Mount Lemmon Survey | · | 2.2 km | MPC · JPL |
| 472503 | 2015 CD_{27} | — | July 12, 2005 | Mount Lemmon | Mount Lemmon Survey | NYS | 790 m | MPC · JPL |
| 472504 | 2015 CB_{28} | — | February 23, 2011 | Catalina | CSS | · | 1.6 km | MPC · JPL |
| 472505 | 2015 CO_{28} | — | March 17, 2004 | Kitt Peak | Spacewatch | · | 1.3 km | MPC · JPL |
| 472506 | 2015 CT_{29} | — | February 27, 2006 | Kitt Peak | Spacewatch | · | 1.9 km | MPC · JPL |
| 472507 | 2015 CD_{30} | — | April 6, 2008 | Kitt Peak | Spacewatch | · | 1.1 km | MPC · JPL |
| 472508 | 2015 CM_{30} | — | October 25, 1995 | Kitt Peak | Spacewatch | · | 2.0 km | MPC · JPL |
| 472509 | 2015 CZ_{31} | — | May 13, 2004 | Kitt Peak | Spacewatch | · | 1.2 km | MPC · JPL |
| 472510 | 2015 CF_{32} | — | August 15, 2009 | Kitt Peak | Spacewatch | · | 1.3 km | MPC · JPL |
| 472511 | 2015 CW_{32} | — | February 2, 2006 | Kitt Peak | Spacewatch | · | 1.6 km | MPC · JPL |
| 472512 | 2015 CM_{35} | — | March 12, 2007 | Catalina | CSS | · | 1.6 km | MPC · JPL |
| 472513 | 2015 CM_{36} | — | March 16, 2005 | Catalina | CSS | · | 2.1 km | MPC · JPL |
| 472514 | 2015 CZ_{36} | — | March 10, 2005 | Kitt Peak | Spacewatch | · | 580 m | MPC · JPL |
| 472515 | 2015 CQ_{38} | — | November 16, 2009 | Mount Lemmon | Mount Lemmon Survey | EUN | 1.3 km | MPC · JPL |
| 472516 | 2015 CY_{38} | — | April 8, 2008 | Mount Lemmon | Mount Lemmon Survey | · | 980 m | MPC · JPL |
| 472517 | 2015 CN_{39} | — | February 17, 2001 | Kitt Peak | Spacewatch | · | 1.9 km | MPC · JPL |
| 472518 | 2015 CL_{41} | — | February 10, 2002 | Socorro | LINEAR | · | 650 m | MPC · JPL |
| 472519 | 2015 CM_{43} | — | March 28, 2008 | Kitt Peak | Spacewatch | V | 550 m | MPC · JPL |
| 472520 | 2015 CL_{44} | — | January 13, 2011 | Kitt Peak | Spacewatch | · | 1.3 km | MPC · JPL |
| 472521 | 2015 CO_{46} | — | January 26, 2001 | Kitt Peak | Spacewatch | · | 940 m | MPC · JPL |
| 472522 | 2015 CF_{47} | — | September 6, 2008 | Kitt Peak | Spacewatch | · | 1.3 km | MPC · JPL |
| 472523 | 2015 CP_{48} | — | August 28, 2005 | Kitt Peak | Spacewatch | · | 1.5 km | MPC · JPL |
| 472524 | 2015 CR_{48} | — | February 10, 2011 | Mount Lemmon | Mount Lemmon Survey | · | 1.4 km | MPC · JPL |
| 472525 | 2015 CX_{49} | — | April 11, 2003 | Kitt Peak | Spacewatch | (5) | 1.1 km | MPC · JPL |
| 472526 | 2015 CL_{51} | — | December 4, 2007 | Mount Lemmon | Mount Lemmon Survey | · | 660 m | MPC · JPL |
| 472527 | 2015 CZ_{52} | — | August 16, 2009 | Kitt Peak | Spacewatch | · | 860 m | MPC · JPL |
| 472528 | 2015 CD_{54} | — | March 17, 2004 | Kitt Peak | Spacewatch | · | 3.1 km | MPC · JPL |
| 472529 | 2015 CW_{57} | — | October 10, 2007 | Catalina | CSS | · | 2.3 km | MPC · JPL |
| 472530 | 2015 CP_{58} | — | December 3, 2008 | Mount Lemmon | Mount Lemmon Survey | · | 2.7 km | MPC · JPL |
| 472531 | 2015 CJ_{61} | — | February 10, 2011 | Catalina | CSS | · | 1.6 km | MPC · JPL |
| 472532 | 2015 CW_{61} | — | January 11, 2002 | Kitt Peak | Spacewatch | · | 1.7 km | MPC · JPL |
| 472533 | 2015 DE | — | February 27, 2006 | Kitt Peak | Spacewatch | · | 2.4 km | MPC · JPL |
| 472534 | 2015 DG | — | February 14, 2008 | Mount Lemmon | Mount Lemmon Survey | · | 890 m | MPC · JPL |
| 472535 | 2015 DS_{2} | — | May 13, 2005 | Mount Lemmon | Mount Lemmon Survey | · | 1.3 km | MPC · JPL |
| 472536 | 2015 DS_{3} | — | April 6, 2005 | Catalina | CSS | · | 2.2 km | MPC · JPL |
| 472537 | 2015 DC_{17} | — | April 17, 2005 | Kitt Peak | Spacewatch | (2076) | 920 m | MPC · JPL |
| 472538 | 2015 DC_{19} | — | December 3, 2010 | Mount Lemmon | Mount Lemmon Survey | · | 680 m | MPC · JPL |
| 472539 | 2015 DE_{21} | — | May 21, 2006 | Kitt Peak | Spacewatch | · | 820 m | MPC · JPL |
| 472540 | 2015 DL_{22} | — | February 8, 2008 | Mount Lemmon | Mount Lemmon Survey | · | 1.0 km | MPC · JPL |
| 472541 | 2015 DW_{23} | — | March 28, 2012 | Mount Lemmon | Mount Lemmon Survey | · | 950 m | MPC · JPL |
| 472542 | 2015 DW_{25} | — | March 2, 2008 | Kitt Peak | Spacewatch | V | 630 m | MPC · JPL |
| 472543 | 2015 DN_{26} | — | February 26, 2007 | Mount Lemmon | Mount Lemmon Survey | · | 1.0 km | MPC · JPL |
| 472544 | 2015 DJ_{29} | — | December 1, 2003 | Kitt Peak | Spacewatch | V | 670 m | MPC · JPL |
| 472545 | 2015 DL_{31} | — | May 10, 2007 | Kitt Peak | Spacewatch | · | 1.5 km | MPC · JPL |
| 472546 | 2015 DH_{32} | — | March 26, 2011 | Mount Lemmon | Mount Lemmon Survey | EUN | 1.1 km | MPC · JPL |
| 472547 | 2015 DN_{32} | — | January 22, 2006 | Mount Lemmon | Mount Lemmon Survey | · | 2.1 km | MPC · JPL |
| 472548 | 2015 DN_{33} | — | October 23, 2001 | Kitt Peak | Spacewatch | NYS | 1.1 km | MPC · JPL |
| 472549 | 2015 DL_{34} | — | April 5, 2003 | Kitt Peak | Spacewatch | · | 1.1 km | MPC · JPL |
| 472550 | 2015 DY_{36} | — | April 26, 2000 | Kitt Peak | Spacewatch | · | 870 m | MPC · JPL |
| 472551 | 2015 DM_{38} | — | March 17, 2007 | Anderson Mesa | LONEOS | · | 1.8 km | MPC · JPL |
| 472552 | 2015 DT_{38} | — | January 17, 2007 | Kitt Peak | Spacewatch | · | 1.2 km | MPC · JPL |
| 472553 | 2015 DD_{41} | — | April 25, 2006 | Kitt Peak | Spacewatch | · | 2.4 km | MPC · JPL |
| 472554 | 2015 DX_{44} | — | January 16, 2009 | Kitt Peak | Spacewatch | · | 3.6 km | MPC · JPL |
| 472555 | 2015 DF_{45} | — | March 5, 2011 | Mount Lemmon | Mount Lemmon Survey | · | 1.5 km | MPC · JPL |
| 472556 | 2015 DO_{45} | — | October 25, 2005 | Mount Lemmon | Mount Lemmon Survey | · | 1.1 km | MPC · JPL |
| 472557 | 2015 DQ_{45} | — | January 8, 2010 | Kitt Peak | Spacewatch | · | 3.0 km | MPC · JPL |
| 472558 | 2015 DM_{49} | — | October 10, 2004 | Kitt Peak | Spacewatch | · | 1.5 km | MPC · JPL |
| 472559 | 2015 DO_{52} | — | December 29, 2008 | Mount Lemmon | Mount Lemmon Survey | EOS | 1.8 km | MPC · JPL |
| 472560 | 2015 DE_{53} | — | February 22, 2004 | Kitt Peak | Spacewatch | · | 2.6 km | MPC · JPL |
| 472561 | 2015 DD_{60} | — | February 11, 2008 | Mount Lemmon | Mount Lemmon Survey | · | 1.1 km | MPC · JPL |
| 472562 | 2015 DY_{61} | — | January 10, 2011 | Kitt Peak | Spacewatch | · | 1.2 km | MPC · JPL |
| 472563 | 2015 DQ_{62} | — | October 1, 2008 | Mount Lemmon | Mount Lemmon Survey | · | 1.7 km | MPC · JPL |
| 472564 | 2015 DO_{68} | — | February 29, 2008 | Kitt Peak | Spacewatch | · | 890 m | MPC · JPL |
| 472565 | 2015 DR_{73} | — | February 26, 2008 | Mount Lemmon | Mount Lemmon Survey | · | 660 m | MPC · JPL |
| 472566 | 2015 DP_{74} | — | March 28, 2008 | Mount Lemmon | Mount Lemmon Survey | · | 780 m | MPC · JPL |
| 472567 | 2015 DF_{80} | — | September 29, 2008 | Mount Lemmon | Mount Lemmon Survey | · | 1.4 km | MPC · JPL |
| 472568 | 2015 DD_{81} | — | January 3, 2009 | Mount Lemmon | Mount Lemmon Survey | · | 2.7 km | MPC · JPL |
| 472569 | 2015 DB_{82} | — | October 6, 2008 | Mount Lemmon | Mount Lemmon Survey | · | 1.7 km | MPC · JPL |
| 472570 | 2015 DN_{84} | — | June 20, 2010 | WISE | WISE | EOS | 3.5 km | MPC · JPL |
| 472571 | 2015 DE_{90} | — | January 15, 2011 | Mount Lemmon | Mount Lemmon Survey | · | 1.2 km | MPC · JPL |
| 472572 | 2015 DK_{94} | — | September 17, 2003 | Kitt Peak | Spacewatch | · | 2.0 km | MPC · JPL |
| 472573 | 2015 DD_{95} | — | November 19, 2007 | Mount Lemmon | Mount Lemmon Survey | · | 790 m | MPC · JPL |
| 472574 | 2015 DU_{96} | — | November 7, 2012 | Catalina | CSS | · | 1.9 km | MPC · JPL |
| 472575 | 2015 DD_{101} | — | March 23, 1995 | Kitt Peak | Spacewatch | · | 1.6 km | MPC · JPL |
| 472576 | 2015 DK_{109} | — | October 22, 2006 | Kitt Peak | Spacewatch | · | 1.1 km | MPC · JPL |
| 472577 | 2015 DU_{110} | — | May 8, 2005 | Kitt Peak | Spacewatch | · | 3.0 km | MPC · JPL |
| 472578 | 2015 DV_{113} | — | September 27, 2006 | Mount Lemmon | Mount Lemmon Survey | · | 1.1 km | MPC · JPL |
| 472579 | 2015 DC_{117} | — | March 18, 2004 | Socorro | LINEAR | (1118) | 4.7 km | MPC · JPL |
| 472580 | 2015 DW_{117} | — | December 1, 2003 | Kitt Peak | Spacewatch | · | 850 m | MPC · JPL |
| 472581 | 2015 DC_{118} | — | January 19, 2009 | Mount Lemmon | Mount Lemmon Survey | VER | 4.7 km | MPC · JPL |
| 472582 | 2015 DJ_{118} | — | February 11, 2004 | Kitt Peak | Spacewatch | · | 2.1 km | MPC · JPL |
| 472583 | 2015 DL_{120} | — | February 14, 2008 | Mount Lemmon | Mount Lemmon Survey | V | 690 m | MPC · JPL |
| 472584 | 2015 DN_{120} | — | April 21, 2002 | Kitt Peak | Spacewatch | · | 920 m | MPC · JPL |
| 472585 | 2015 DU_{120} | — | May 18, 2010 | WISE | WISE | · | 1.8 km | MPC · JPL |
| 472586 | 2015 DH_{121} | — | May 2, 2010 | WISE | WISE | · | 2.1 km | MPC · JPL |
| 472587 | 2015 DE_{122} | — | October 28, 2008 | Kitt Peak | Spacewatch | · | 3.4 km | MPC · JPL |
| 472588 | 2015 DL_{122} | — | May 6, 2010 | Catalina | CSS | EOS | 4.6 km | MPC · JPL |
| 472589 | 2015 DC_{124} | — | May 7, 2008 | Mount Lemmon | Mount Lemmon Survey | V | 840 m | MPC · JPL |
| 472590 | 2015 DO_{125} | — | May 10, 2007 | Kitt Peak | Spacewatch | · | 1.3 km | MPC · JPL |
| 472591 | 2015 DT_{130} | — | February 10, 2007 | Catalina | CSS | PHO | 3.9 km | MPC · JPL |
| 472592 | 2015 DZ_{133} | — | March 25, 2011 | Catalina | CSS | · | 1.6 km | MPC · JPL |
| 472593 | 2015 DC_{134} | — | May 26, 2003 | Kitt Peak | Spacewatch | · | 2.6 km | MPC · JPL |
| 472594 | 2015 DJ_{136} | — | May 24, 2011 | Mount Lemmon | Mount Lemmon Survey | · | 2.0 km | MPC · JPL |
| 472595 | 2015 DV_{136} | — | January 26, 2006 | Mount Lemmon | Mount Lemmon Survey | · | 1.8 km | MPC · JPL |
| 472596 | 2015 DE_{137} | — | May 4, 2005 | Kitt Peak | Spacewatch | · | 2.4 km | MPC · JPL |
| 472597 | 2015 DX_{137} | — | December 29, 2008 | Catalina | CSS | · | 4.3 km | MPC · JPL |
| 472598 | 2015 DZ_{137} | — | March 4, 2005 | Catalina | CSS | · | 2.4 km | MPC · JPL |
| 472599 | 2015 DB_{138} | — | May 27, 1998 | Kitt Peak | Spacewatch | · | 2.7 km | MPC · JPL |
| 472600 | 2015 DG_{138} | — | June 18, 2005 | Mount Lemmon | Mount Lemmon Survey | · | 3.8 km | MPC · JPL |

== 472601–472700 ==
back to top

| Designation | | | Discovery | | | Properties | | Ref |
| Permanent | Provisional | Named after | Date | Site | Discoverer(s) | Category | Diam. | Ref |
|---|---|---|---|---|---|---|---|---|
| 472601 | 2015 DG_{145} | — | September 25, 2006 | Kitt Peak | Spacewatch | · | 1.1 km | MPC · JPL |
| 472602 | 2015 DZ_{147} | — | February 9, 2010 | Kitt Peak | Spacewatch | · | 2.3 km | MPC · JPL |
| 472603 | 2015 DZ_{151} | — | December 12, 2006 | Kitt Peak | Spacewatch | · | 1.0 km | MPC · JPL |
| 472604 | 2015 DJ_{152} | — | January 17, 2009 | Kitt Peak | Spacewatch | VER | 2.7 km | MPC · JPL |
| 472605 | 2015 DQ_{152} | — | March 31, 2008 | Kitt Peak | Spacewatch | · | 1.4 km | MPC · JPL |
| 472606 | 2015 DE_{154} | — | March 20, 2010 | Mount Lemmon | Mount Lemmon Survey | · | 4.2 km | MPC · JPL |
| 472607 | 2015 DR_{154} | — | February 25, 2006 | Kitt Peak | Spacewatch | · | 2.0 km | MPC · JPL |
| 472608 | 2015 DH_{156} | — | January 4, 2006 | Mount Lemmon | Mount Lemmon Survey | · | 1.6 km | MPC · JPL |
| 472609 | 2015 DQ_{157} | — | February 25, 2008 | Mount Lemmon | Mount Lemmon Survey | · | 610 m | MPC · JPL |
| 472610 | 2015 DA_{158} | — | September 19, 2009 | Mount Lemmon | Mount Lemmon Survey | · | 1.4 km | MPC · JPL |
| 472611 | 2015 DA_{162} | — | December 20, 2009 | Kitt Peak | Spacewatch | · | 2.3 km | MPC · JPL |
| 472612 | 2015 DT_{163} | — | April 21, 2006 | Kitt Peak | Spacewatch | · | 1.5 km | MPC · JPL |
| 472613 | 2015 DF_{165} | — | October 12, 2005 | Kitt Peak | Spacewatch | · | 1.2 km | MPC · JPL |
| 472614 | 2015 DP_{165} | — | January 30, 2011 | Mount Lemmon | Mount Lemmon Survey | · | 980 m | MPC · JPL |
| 472615 | 2015 DJ_{166} | — | November 3, 2005 | Mount Lemmon | Mount Lemmon Survey | · | 1.6 km | MPC · JPL |
| 472616 | 2015 DC_{167} | — | July 29, 2008 | Kitt Peak | Spacewatch | KON | 2.6 km | MPC · JPL |
| 472617 | 2015 DL_{167} | — | April 18, 2007 | Kitt Peak | Spacewatch | · | 1.1 km | MPC · JPL |
| 472618 | 2015 DR_{168} | — | September 7, 2008 | Mount Lemmon | Mount Lemmon Survey | · | 1.9 km | MPC · JPL |
| 472619 | 2015 DZ_{175} | — | April 13, 2010 | WISE | WISE | · | 3.5 km | MPC · JPL |
| 472620 | 2015 DC_{176} | — | February 1, 2010 | WISE | WISE | · | 2.8 km | MPC · JPL |
| 472621 | 2015 DH_{178} | — | April 9, 2010 | Kitt Peak | Spacewatch | THB | 2.9 km | MPC · JPL |
| 472622 | 2015 DB_{181} | — | November 16, 2006 | Mount Lemmon | Mount Lemmon Survey | · | 1.4 km | MPC · JPL |
| 472623 | 2015 DL_{181} | — | May 16, 2007 | Siding Spring | SSS | · | 2.0 km | MPC · JPL |
| 472624 | 2015 DC_{188} | — | June 2, 2003 | Kitt Peak | Spacewatch | · | 1.5 km | MPC · JPL |
| 472625 | 2015 DR_{194} | — | September 25, 2006 | Catalina | CSS | PHO | 1.2 km | MPC · JPL |
| 472626 | 2015 DS_{197} | — | October 4, 2006 | Mount Lemmon | Mount Lemmon Survey | · | 1.2 km | MPC · JPL |
| 472627 | 2015 DV_{197} | — | August 27, 2006 | Anderson Mesa | LONEOS | · | 3.5 km | MPC · JPL |
| 472628 | 2015 DA_{198} | — | December 26, 2011 | Mount Lemmon | Mount Lemmon Survey | H | 530 m | MPC · JPL |
| 472629 | 2015 DP_{199} | — | May 6, 2010 | Mount Lemmon | Mount Lemmon Survey | H | 560 m | MPC · JPL |
| 472630 | 2015 DB_{205} | — | April 11, 2011 | Mount Lemmon | Mount Lemmon Survey | · | 1.1 km | MPC · JPL |
| 472631 | 2015 DS_{206} | — | February 9, 2010 | Mount Lemmon | Mount Lemmon Survey | · | 1.6 km | MPC · JPL |
| 472632 | 2015 DW_{206} | — | April 14, 2010 | Kitt Peak | Spacewatch | EOS | 2.0 km | MPC · JPL |
| 472633 | 2015 DD_{207} | — | December 19, 2009 | Mount Lemmon | Mount Lemmon Survey | · | 3.6 km | MPC · JPL |
| 472634 | 2015 DG_{207} | — | May 24, 2006 | Kitt Peak | Spacewatch | · | 2.0 km | MPC · JPL |
| 472635 | 2015 DN_{207} | — | February 26, 2009 | Kitt Peak | Spacewatch | · | 2.4 km | MPC · JPL |
| 472636 | 2015 DK_{208} | — | June 4, 2011 | Mount Lemmon | Mount Lemmon Survey | · | 1.7 km | MPC · JPL |
| 472637 | 2015 DA_{209} | — | December 21, 2000 | Kitt Peak | Spacewatch | · | 2.0 km | MPC · JPL |
| 472638 | 2015 DR_{209} | — | November 18, 2008 | Kitt Peak | Spacewatch | · | 1.9 km | MPC · JPL |
| 472639 | 2015 DV_{210} | — | June 3, 2011 | Mount Lemmon | Mount Lemmon Survey | · | 2.1 km | MPC · JPL |
| 472640 | 2015 DG_{211} | — | April 25, 2007 | Mount Lemmon | Mount Lemmon Survey | · | 1.4 km | MPC · JPL |
| 472641 | 2015 DN_{211} | — | September 28, 2003 | Anderson Mesa | LONEOS | · | 2.7 km | MPC · JPL |
| 472642 | 2015 DZ_{211} | — | January 17, 2007 | Kitt Peak | Spacewatch | V | 670 m | MPC · JPL |
| 472643 | 2015 DF_{212} | — | December 4, 2007 | Kitt Peak | Spacewatch | EMA | 4.8 km | MPC · JPL |
| 472644 | 2015 DG_{212} | — | June 13, 2005 | Mount Lemmon | Mount Lemmon Survey | · | 1.2 km | MPC · JPL |
| 472645 | 2015 DL_{212} | — | January 8, 2010 | Kitt Peak | Spacewatch | · | 2.0 km | MPC · JPL |
| 472646 | 2015 DR_{212} | — | December 31, 2007 | Kitt Peak | Spacewatch | EOS | 2.2 km | MPC · JPL |
| 472647 | 2015 DA_{213} | — | February 3, 2009 | Mount Lemmon | Mount Lemmon Survey | · | 2.1 km | MPC · JPL |
| 472648 | 2015 DF_{213} | — | December 18, 2004 | Mount Lemmon | Mount Lemmon Survey | · | 2.1 km | MPC · JPL |
| 472649 | 2015 DN_{213} | — | February 23, 2007 | Kitt Peak | Spacewatch | · | 1.5 km | MPC · JPL |
| 472650 | 2015 DV_{213} | — | August 17, 1999 | Kitt Peak | Spacewatch | · | 1.7 km | MPC · JPL |
| 472651 | 2015 DB_{216} | — | February 27, 2015 | Mount Lemmon | Mount Lemmon Survey | centaur | 109 km | MPC · JPL |
| 472652 | 2015 DF_{217} | — | February 27, 2006 | Kitt Peak | Spacewatch | · | 1.9 km | MPC · JPL |
| 472653 | 2015 DD_{218} | — | July 25, 1998 | Prescott | P. G. Comba | · | 2.6 km | MPC · JPL |
| 472654 | 2015 DE_{218} | — | July 1, 2005 | Kitt Peak | Spacewatch | · | 790 m | MPC · JPL |
| 472655 | 2015 DH_{218} | — | December 30, 2007 | Kitt Peak | Spacewatch | · | 630 m | MPC · JPL |
| 472656 | 2015 DY_{218} | — | November 28, 2013 | Mount Lemmon | Mount Lemmon Survey | 615 | 1.7 km | MPC · JPL |
| 472657 | 2015 DK_{219} | — | February 26, 2009 | Mount Lemmon | Mount Lemmon Survey | · | 2.3 km | MPC · JPL |
| 472658 | 2015 DU_{219} | — | January 27, 2011 | Kitt Peak | Spacewatch | · | 1.1 km | MPC · JPL |
| 472659 | 2015 DY_{219} | — | October 8, 2005 | Kitt Peak | Spacewatch | T_{j} (2.96) | 3.3 km | MPC · JPL |
| 472660 | 2015 DM_{221} | — | July 26, 2010 | WISE | WISE | · | 5.0 km | MPC · JPL |
| 472661 | 2015 DU_{221} | — | March 5, 2006 | Mount Lemmon | Mount Lemmon Survey | · | 2.1 km | MPC · JPL |
| 472662 | 2015 DM_{222} | — | April 9, 2010 | Kitt Peak | Spacewatch | · | 2.2 km | MPC · JPL |
| 472663 | 2015 DB_{223} | — | October 27, 2006 | Kitt Peak | Spacewatch | · | 1.0 km | MPC · JPL |
| 472664 | 2015 EB_{3} | — | October 20, 2006 | Kitt Peak | Spacewatch | NYS | 1.1 km | MPC · JPL |
| 472665 | 2015 ED_{3} | — | February 29, 2004 | Kitt Peak | Spacewatch | · | 1.3 km | MPC · JPL |
| 472666 | 2015 EJ_{3} | — | September 19, 2001 | Socorro | LINEAR | · | 3.2 km | MPC · JPL |
| 472667 | 2015 ER_{7} | — | December 19, 2003 | Socorro | LINEAR | EOS | 3.0 km | MPC · JPL |
| 472668 | 2015 ER_{8} | — | June 21, 2010 | WISE | WISE | · | 2.4 km | MPC · JPL |
| 472669 | 2015 EC_{9} | — | April 12, 2011 | Mount Lemmon | Mount Lemmon Survey | · | 1.5 km | MPC · JPL |
| 472670 | 2015 EE_{11} | — | March 4, 2012 | Mount Lemmon | Mount Lemmon Survey | · | 680 m | MPC · JPL |
| 472671 | 2015 EY_{14} | — | February 28, 2008 | Mount Lemmon | Mount Lemmon Survey | · | 820 m | MPC · JPL |
| 472672 | 2015 EX_{15} | — | October 10, 2010 | Mount Lemmon | Mount Lemmon Survey | · | 610 m | MPC · JPL |
| 472673 | 2015 EC_{20} | — | September 11, 2004 | Kitt Peak | Spacewatch | MAR | 1.2 km | MPC · JPL |
| 472674 | 2015 EQ_{22} | — | March 15, 2004 | Kitt Peak | Spacewatch | · | 2.9 km | MPC · JPL |
| 472675 | 2015 EF_{24} | — | March 14, 2004 | Kitt Peak | Spacewatch | NYS | 910 m | MPC · JPL |
| 472676 | 2015 EV_{24} | — | May 31, 2012 | Mount Lemmon | Mount Lemmon Survey | V | 620 m | MPC · JPL |
| 472677 | 2015 EB_{27} | — | March 25, 2000 | Kitt Peak | Spacewatch | NYS | 1.3 km | MPC · JPL |
| 472678 | 2015 EU_{37} | — | August 18, 2006 | Kitt Peak | Spacewatch | · | 800 m | MPC · JPL |
| 472679 | 2015 ED_{43} | — | March 16, 2007 | Kitt Peak | Spacewatch | · | 1.3 km | MPC · JPL |
| 472680 | 2015 EO_{46} | — | February 24, 2006 | Mount Lemmon | Mount Lemmon Survey | AEO | 1.2 km | MPC · JPL |
| 472681 | 2015 EY_{53} | — | September 12, 2007 | Catalina | CSS | · | 2.3 km | MPC · JPL |
| 472682 | 2015 EA_{54} | — | May 7, 2006 | Mount Lemmon | Mount Lemmon Survey | · | 3.0 km | MPC · JPL |
| 472683 | 2015 EN_{62} | — | March 18, 2004 | Socorro | LINEAR | · | 3.2 km | MPC · JPL |
| 472684 | 2015 EP_{62} | — | August 24, 2007 | Kitt Peak | Spacewatch | · | 1.9 km | MPC · JPL |
| 472685 | 2015 ER_{63} | — | January 7, 2010 | Mount Lemmon | Mount Lemmon Survey | · | 1.7 km | MPC · JPL |
| 472686 | 2015 EV_{63} | — | July 14, 2004 | Siding Spring | SSS | · | 1.5 km | MPC · JPL |
| 472687 | 2015 EZ_{63} | — | March 28, 2004 | Socorro | LINEAR | · | 3.9 km | MPC · JPL |
| 472688 | 2015 EG_{64} | — | April 18, 2007 | Mount Lemmon | Mount Lemmon Survey | RAF | 880 m | MPC · JPL |
| 472689 | 2015 EL_{64} | — | September 21, 2003 | Kitt Peak | Spacewatch | · | 800 m | MPC · JPL |
| 472690 | 2015 ES_{64} | — | November 30, 2008 | Mount Lemmon | Mount Lemmon Survey | · | 3.1 km | MPC · JPL |
| 472691 | 2015 EZ_{64} | — | January 7, 2010 | Kitt Peak | Spacewatch | · | 1.8 km | MPC · JPL |
| 472692 | 2015 EB_{65} | — | September 23, 2008 | Kitt Peak | Spacewatch | · | 2.0 km | MPC · JPL |
| 472693 | 2015 FY_{2} | — | January 31, 2008 | Catalina | CSS | · | 700 m | MPC · JPL |
| 472694 | 2015 FM_{5} | — | June 11, 2013 | Mount Lemmon | Mount Lemmon Survey | H | 540 m | MPC · JPL |
| 472695 | 2015 FD_{8} | — | January 26, 2006 | Kitt Peak | Spacewatch | · | 2.0 km | MPC · JPL |
| 472696 | 2015 FZ_{19} | — | November 6, 2005 | Mount Lemmon | Mount Lemmon Survey | · | 1.1 km | MPC · JPL |
| 472697 | 2015 FQ_{20} | — | April 20, 2006 | Kitt Peak | Spacewatch | · | 2.3 km | MPC · JPL |
| 472698 | 2015 FV_{22} | — | April 24, 2004 | Kitt Peak | Spacewatch | · | 4.0 km | MPC · JPL |
| 472699 | 2015 FC_{23} | — | October 5, 2000 | Haleakala | NEAT | · | 2.1 km | MPC · JPL |
| 472700 | 2015 FX_{24} | — | May 2, 2003 | Catalina | CSS | EUN | 1.5 km | MPC · JPL |

== 472701–472800 ==
back to top

| Designation | | | Discovery | | | Properties | | Ref |
| Permanent | Provisional | Named after | Date | Site | Discoverer(s) | Category | Diam. | Ref |
|---|---|---|---|---|---|---|---|---|
| 472701 | 2015 FS_{37} | — | May 22, 2011 | Mount Lemmon | Mount Lemmon Survey | EUN | 870 m | MPC · JPL |
| 472702 | 2015 FT_{38} | — | September 14, 2006 | Kitt Peak | Spacewatch | · | 1.9 km | MPC · JPL |
| 472703 | 2015 FY_{38} | — | April 21, 1998 | Kitt Peak | Spacewatch | · | 3.5 km | MPC · JPL |
| 472704 | 2015 FX_{39} | — | November 3, 2008 | Kitt Peak | Spacewatch | · | 1.6 km | MPC · JPL |
| 472705 | 2015 FX_{40} | — | December 14, 2004 | Kitt Peak | Spacewatch | · | 2.3 km | MPC · JPL |
| 472706 | 2015 FA_{42} | — | March 9, 2005 | Mount Lemmon | Mount Lemmon Survey | · | 2.1 km | MPC · JPL |
| 472707 | 2015 FH_{42} | — | December 11, 2004 | Campo Imperatore | CINEOS | · | 1.6 km | MPC · JPL |
| 472708 | 2015 FN_{42} | — | March 26, 2004 | Kitt Peak | Spacewatch | EOS | 2.1 km | MPC · JPL |
| 472709 | 2015 FT_{42} | — | July 8, 2005 | Catalina | CSS | TIR | 3.0 km | MPC · JPL |
| 472710 | 2015 FW_{42} | — | March 26, 2006 | Mount Lemmon | Mount Lemmon Survey | · | 1.7 km | MPC · JPL |
| 472711 | 2015 FM_{43} | — | January 31, 2009 | Mount Lemmon | Mount Lemmon Survey | · | 2.3 km | MPC · JPL |
| 472712 | 2015 FA_{45} | — | February 19, 2009 | Mount Lemmon | Mount Lemmon Survey | · | 2.0 km | MPC · JPL |
| 472713 | 2015 FD_{45} | — | September 19, 2006 | Kitt Peak | Spacewatch | · | 2.4 km | MPC · JPL |
| 472714 | 2015 FF_{45} | — | January 15, 2008 | Mount Lemmon | Mount Lemmon Survey | · | 2.6 km | MPC · JPL |
| 472715 | 2015 FJ_{45} | — | October 3, 2006 | Mount Lemmon | Mount Lemmon Survey | · | 690 m | MPC · JPL |
| 472716 | 2015 FD_{48} | — | March 26, 2011 | Mount Lemmon | Mount Lemmon Survey | · | 1.4 km | MPC · JPL |
| 472717 | 2015 FY_{48} | — | April 12, 2004 | Siding Spring | SSS | PHO | 1.1 km | MPC · JPL |
| 472718 | 2015 FB_{56} | — | June 19, 2012 | Kitt Peak | Spacewatch | · | 2.0 km | MPC · JPL |
| 472719 | 2015 FK_{67} | — | January 9, 2010 | Mount Lemmon | Mount Lemmon Survey | · | 3.4 km | MPC · JPL |
| 472720 | 2015 FE_{68} | — | October 30, 2008 | Kitt Peak | Spacewatch | · | 2.5 km | MPC · JPL |
| 472721 | 2015 FW_{68} | — | February 13, 2010 | Catalina | CSS | · | 2.3 km | MPC · JPL |
| 472722 | 2015 FN_{71} | — | February 18, 2008 | Mount Lemmon | Mount Lemmon Survey | CYB | 4.5 km | MPC · JPL |
| 472723 | 2015 FB_{72} | — | January 2, 2006 | Socorro | LINEAR | · | 1.5 km | MPC · JPL |
| 472724 | 2015 FJ_{72} | — | September 23, 2008 | Mount Lemmon | Mount Lemmon Survey | · | 1.0 km | MPC · JPL |
| 472725 | 2015 FP_{72} | — | December 30, 2013 | Kitt Peak | Spacewatch | KOR | 1.2 km | MPC · JPL |
| 472726 | 2015 FA_{73} | — | October 18, 2006 | Kitt Peak | Spacewatch | · | 2.8 km | MPC · JPL |
| 472727 | 2015 FR_{73} | — | March 26, 2006 | Kitt Peak | Spacewatch | MRX | 1.2 km | MPC · JPL |
| 472728 | 2015 FW_{74} | — | February 4, 2005 | Kitt Peak | Spacewatch | · | 1.8 km | MPC · JPL |
| 472729 | 2015 FY_{74} | — | May 2, 2003 | Kitt Peak | Spacewatch | · | 2.6 km | MPC · JPL |
| 472730 | 2015 FD_{75} | — | October 8, 2012 | Mount Lemmon | Mount Lemmon Survey | · | 2.4 km | MPC · JPL |
| 472731 | 2015 FL_{75} | — | May 7, 2010 | Mount Lemmon | Mount Lemmon Survey | · | 1.8 km | MPC · JPL |
| 472732 | 2015 FL_{76} | — | October 12, 2007 | Mount Lemmon | Mount Lemmon Survey | · | 2.4 km | MPC · JPL |
| 472733 | 2015 FP_{77} | — | May 16, 2005 | Kitt Peak | Spacewatch | · | 2.5 km | MPC · JPL |
| 472734 | 2015 FW_{77} | — | February 7, 2002 | Socorro | LINEAR | · | 1.7 km | MPC · JPL |
| 472735 | 2015 FF_{78} | — | May 23, 2004 | Kitt Peak | Spacewatch | · | 3.5 km | MPC · JPL |
| 472736 | 2015 FL_{78} | — | January 24, 2007 | Catalina | CSS | MAS | 740 m | MPC · JPL |
| 472737 | 2015 FM_{78} | — | April 22, 2004 | Kitt Peak | Spacewatch | · | 1.1 km | MPC · JPL |
| 472738 | 2015 FW_{78} | — | February 20, 2006 | Kitt Peak | Spacewatch | · | 1.7 km | MPC · JPL |
| 472739 | 2015 FS_{84} | — | October 10, 2012 | Mount Lemmon | Mount Lemmon Survey | · | 1.9 km | MPC · JPL |
| 472740 | 2015 FQ_{94} | — | January 30, 2009 | Mount Lemmon | Mount Lemmon Survey | · | 2.2 km | MPC · JPL |
| 472741 | 2015 FR_{94} | — | February 28, 2010 | WISE | WISE | LIX | 3.1 km | MPC · JPL |
| 472742 | 2015 FA_{96} | — | December 21, 2006 | Kitt Peak | Spacewatch | · | 1.5 km | MPC · JPL |
| 472743 | 2015 FH_{96} | — | September 29, 2009 | Mount Lemmon | Mount Lemmon Survey | · | 1.6 km | MPC · JPL |
| 472744 | 2015 FB_{97} | — | October 8, 2008 | Mount Lemmon | Mount Lemmon Survey | · | 1.7 km | MPC · JPL |
| 472745 | 2015 FY_{97} | — | August 25, 1995 | Kitt Peak | Spacewatch | EOS | 2.0 km | MPC · JPL |
| 472746 | 2015 FV_{99} | — | January 18, 2008 | Mount Lemmon | Mount Lemmon Survey | · | 860 m | MPC · JPL |
| 472747 | 2015 FG_{101} | — | January 23, 2006 | Kitt Peak | Spacewatch | · | 2.1 km | MPC · JPL |
| 472748 | 2015 FM_{101} | — | June 3, 2008 | Mount Lemmon | Mount Lemmon Survey | · | 1.4 km | MPC · JPL |
| 472749 | 2015 FY_{101} | — | January 25, 2009 | Kitt Peak | Spacewatch | LIX | 3.1 km | MPC · JPL |
| 472750 | 2015 FZ_{101} | — | October 8, 2008 | Mount Lemmon | Mount Lemmon Survey | · | 1.7 km | MPC · JPL |
| 472751 | 2015 FH_{102} | — | January 7, 2010 | Kitt Peak | Spacewatch | · | 1.7 km | MPC · JPL |
| 472752 | 2015 FK_{103} | — | May 8, 2008 | Mount Lemmon | Mount Lemmon Survey | · | 1.4 km | MPC · JPL |
| 472753 | 2015 FP_{111} | — | September 10, 2004 | Kitt Peak | Spacewatch | · | 1.5 km | MPC · JPL |
| 472754 | 2015 FN_{112} | — | October 1, 2008 | Mount Lemmon | Mount Lemmon Survey | · | 2.0 km | MPC · JPL |
| 472755 | 2015 FO_{113} | — | February 12, 2008 | Mount Lemmon | Mount Lemmon Survey | (1338) (FLO) | 690 m | MPC · JPL |
| 472756 | 2015 FQ_{113} | — | January 9, 2007 | Mount Lemmon | Mount Lemmon Survey | · | 1.2 km | MPC · JPL |
| 472757 | 2015 FZ_{114} | — | May 15, 2005 | Mount Lemmon | Mount Lemmon Survey | · | 1.1 km | MPC · JPL |
| 472758 | 2015 FH_{115} | — | September 22, 2008 | Kitt Peak | Spacewatch | · | 1.9 km | MPC · JPL |
| 472759 | 2015 FX_{116} | — | August 21, 2006 | Kitt Peak | Spacewatch | · | 730 m | MPC · JPL |
| 472760 | 2015 FZ_{117} | — | March 23, 2015 | Haleakala | Pan-STARRS 1 | centaur | 40 km | MPC · JPL |
| 472761 | 2015 FZ_{118} | — | January 10, 2007 | Kitt Peak | Spacewatch | · | 1.8 km | MPC · JPL |
| 472762 | 2015 FR_{119} | — | March 26, 2011 | Catalina | CSS | · | 1.5 km | MPC · JPL |
| 472763 | 2015 FV_{120} | — | September 21, 2003 | Kitt Peak | Spacewatch | · | 2.8 km | MPC · JPL |
| 472764 | 2015 FY_{120} | — | December 16, 2006 | Kitt Peak | Spacewatch | · | 1.1 km | MPC · JPL |
| 472765 | 2015 FP_{121} | — | March 1, 2009 | Mount Lemmon | Mount Lemmon Survey | · | 4.4 km | MPC · JPL |
| 472766 | 2015 FZ_{121} | — | February 11, 2011 | Mount Lemmon | Mount Lemmon Survey | · | 920 m | MPC · JPL |
| 472767 | 2015 FE_{122} | — | February 8, 2000 | Kitt Peak | Spacewatch | NYS | 1.2 km | MPC · JPL |
| 472768 | 2015 FX_{122} | — | August 10, 2007 | Kitt Peak | Spacewatch | · | 2.4 km | MPC · JPL |
| 472769 | 2015 FU_{123} | — | May 16, 2002 | Socorro | LINEAR | · | 710 m | MPC · JPL |
| 472770 | 2015 FB_{124} | — | April 20, 2007 | Kitt Peak | Spacewatch | · | 1.3 km | MPC · JPL |
| 472771 | 2015 FX_{133} | — | June 4, 2011 | Mount Lemmon | Mount Lemmon Survey | · | 2.0 km | MPC · JPL |
| 472772 | 2015 FY_{134} | — | January 13, 2010 | Mount Lemmon | Mount Lemmon Survey | DOR | 2.5 km | MPC · JPL |
| 472773 | 2015 FU_{136} | — | February 2, 2009 | Mount Lemmon | Mount Lemmon Survey | · | 4.4 km | MPC · JPL |
| 472774 | 2015 FS_{137} | — | April 13, 2004 | Kitt Peak | Spacewatch | · | 1.2 km | MPC · JPL |
| 472775 | 2015 FT_{138} | — | January 30, 2008 | Kitt Peak | Spacewatch | · | 750 m | MPC · JPL |
| 472776 | 2015 FG_{141} | — | December 5, 2005 | Kitt Peak | Spacewatch | · | 1.2 km | MPC · JPL |
| 472777 | 2015 FS_{142} | — | September 25, 2006 | Mount Lemmon | Mount Lemmon Survey | · | 1.9 km | MPC · JPL |
| 472778 | 2015 FS_{147} | — | August 30, 2005 | Kitt Peak | Spacewatch | THB | 3.5 km | MPC · JPL |
| 472779 | 2015 FO_{148} | — | June 30, 2005 | Kitt Peak | Spacewatch | · | 2.3 km | MPC · JPL |
| 472780 | 2015 FQ_{148} | — | November 1, 2000 | Socorro | LINEAR | · | 720 m | MPC · JPL |
| 472781 | 2015 FZ_{148} | — | September 26, 2008 | Kitt Peak | Spacewatch | MRX | 890 m | MPC · JPL |
| 472782 | 2015 FV_{149} | — | March 11, 2008 | Kitt Peak | Spacewatch | (2076) | 770 m | MPC · JPL |
| 472783 | 2015 FC_{150} | — | October 5, 2003 | Kitt Peak | Spacewatch | · | 1.9 km | MPC · JPL |
| 472784 | 2015 FD_{150} | — | May 2, 2006 | Kitt Peak | Spacewatch | GEF | 1.2 km | MPC · JPL |
| 472785 | 2015 FE_{150} | — | March 29, 2008 | Kitt Peak | Spacewatch | · | 760 m | MPC · JPL |
| 472786 | 2015 FF_{150} | — | October 27, 2006 | Mount Lemmon | Mount Lemmon Survey | · | 800 m | MPC · JPL |
| 472787 | 2015 FH_{150} | — | October 24, 2005 | Kitt Peak | Spacewatch | · | 1.4 km | MPC · JPL |
| 472788 | 2015 FO_{150} | — | September 23, 2008 | Mount Lemmon | Mount Lemmon Survey | · | 1.5 km | MPC · JPL |
| 472789 | 2015 FL_{151} | — | April 5, 2000 | Socorro | LINEAR | · | 1.3 km | MPC · JPL |
| 472790 | 2015 FS_{151} | — | December 20, 2007 | Mount Lemmon | Mount Lemmon Survey | · | 740 m | MPC · JPL |
| 472791 | 2015 FW_{151} | — | April 26, 2006 | Kitt Peak | Spacewatch | · | 1.5 km | MPC · JPL |
| 472792 | 2015 FC_{152} | — | November 3, 2007 | Kitt Peak | Spacewatch | THM | 2.5 km | MPC · JPL |
| 472793 | 2015 FE_{152} | — | January 22, 2006 | Mount Lemmon | Mount Lemmon Survey | · | 1.3 km | MPC · JPL |
| 472794 | 2015 FQ_{152} | — | March 4, 2011 | Mount Lemmon | Mount Lemmon Survey | · | 1.3 km | MPC · JPL |
| 472795 | 2015 FS_{152} | — | October 3, 2003 | Kitt Peak | Spacewatch | · | 3.1 km | MPC · JPL |
| 472796 | 2015 FT_{152} | — | November 5, 2005 | Kitt Peak | Spacewatch | · | 900 m | MPC · JPL |
| 472797 | 2015 FT_{153} | — | March 24, 2006 | Mount Lemmon | Mount Lemmon Survey | · | 1.7 km | MPC · JPL |
| 472798 | 2015 FL_{156} | — | April 30, 2005 | Kitt Peak | Spacewatch | · | 770 m | MPC · JPL |
| 472799 | 2015 FX_{156} | — | September 23, 2008 | Mount Lemmon | Mount Lemmon Survey | · | 1.5 km | MPC · JPL |
| 472800 | 2015 FL_{157} | — | January 8, 2010 | Kitt Peak | Spacewatch | · | 1.9 km | MPC · JPL |

== 472801–472900 ==
back to top

| Designation | | | Discovery | | | Properties | | Ref |
| Permanent | Provisional | Named after | Date | Site | Discoverer(s) | Category | Diam. | Ref |
|---|---|---|---|---|---|---|---|---|
| 472801 | 2015 FM_{158} | — | February 19, 2009 | Mount Lemmon | Mount Lemmon Survey | · | 3.0 km | MPC · JPL |
| 472802 | 2015 FV_{159} | — | October 31, 2006 | Mount Lemmon | Mount Lemmon Survey | · | 3.2 km | MPC · JPL |
| 472803 | 2015 FQ_{160} | — | March 16, 2007 | Mount Lemmon | Mount Lemmon Survey | · | 1.3 km | MPC · JPL |
| 472804 | 2015 FR_{160} | — | November 11, 2001 | Kitt Peak | Spacewatch | · | 3.3 km | MPC · JPL |
| 472805 | 2015 FT_{160} | — | May 2, 2003 | Kitt Peak | Spacewatch | · | 1.2 km | MPC · JPL |
| 472806 | 2015 FW_{160} | — | February 16, 2010 | Kitt Peak | Spacewatch | WIT | 990 m | MPC · JPL |
| 472807 | 2015 FC_{161} | — | January 16, 1996 | Kitt Peak | Spacewatch | AGN | 1.4 km | MPC · JPL |
| 472808 | 2015 FE_{161} | — | May 13, 2004 | Kitt Peak | Spacewatch | · | 3.1 km | MPC · JPL |
| 472809 | 2015 FP_{161} | — | May 8, 2011 | Kitt Peak | Spacewatch | · | 1.3 km | MPC · JPL |
| 472810 | 2015 FT_{161} | — | March 28, 1993 | Kitt Peak | Spacewatch | · | 1.7 km | MPC · JPL |
| 472811 | 2015 FG_{162} | — | February 14, 2010 | Mount Lemmon | Mount Lemmon Survey | · | 1.7 km | MPC · JPL |
| 472812 | 2015 FK_{162} | — | October 1, 2008 | Kitt Peak | Spacewatch | MRX | 1.1 km | MPC · JPL |
| 472813 | 2015 FO_{162} | — | December 24, 2006 | Kitt Peak | Spacewatch | · | 920 m | MPC · JPL |
| 472814 | 2015 FS_{162} | — | April 30, 2006 | Kitt Peak | Spacewatch | · | 2.2 km | MPC · JPL |
| 472815 | 2015 FV_{162} | — | February 18, 2008 | Mount Lemmon | Mount Lemmon Survey | · | 710 m | MPC · JPL |
| 472816 | 2015 FD_{163} | — | October 27, 2008 | Mount Lemmon | Mount Lemmon Survey | · | 1.8 km | MPC · JPL |
| 472817 | 2015 FR_{166} | — | February 26, 2009 | Kitt Peak | Spacewatch | LIX | 3.1 km | MPC · JPL |
| 472818 | 2015 FW_{166} | — | October 27, 2003 | Kitt Peak | Spacewatch | · | 3.6 km | MPC · JPL |
| 472819 | 2015 FB_{169} | — | October 11, 2012 | Mount Lemmon | Mount Lemmon Survey | AGN | 1 km | MPC · JPL |
| 472820 | 2015 FM_{171} | — | October 24, 2003 | Kitt Peak | Spacewatch | HOF | 2.2 km | MPC · JPL |
| 472821 | 2015 FE_{173} | — | May 10, 2005 | Kitt Peak | Spacewatch | · | 1.0 km | MPC · JPL |
| 472822 | 2015 FP_{173} | — | February 17, 2007 | Kitt Peak | Spacewatch | · | 1.1 km | MPC · JPL |
| 472823 | 2015 FS_{173} | — | July 24, 2010 | WISE | WISE | · | 2.3 km | MPC · JPL |
| 472824 | 2015 FT_{174} | — | January 31, 2006 | Kitt Peak | Spacewatch | · | 1.5 km | MPC · JPL |
| 472825 | 2015 FH_{175} | — | January 20, 2009 | Kitt Peak | Spacewatch | EOS | 1.8 km | MPC · JPL |
| 472826 | 2015 FH_{176} | — | February 22, 2004 | Kitt Peak | Spacewatch | · | 2.0 km | MPC · JPL |
| 472827 | 2015 FK_{176} | — | April 8, 2006 | Siding Spring | SSS | · | 2.1 km | MPC · JPL |
| 472828 | 2015 FS_{177} | — | March 3, 2006 | Kitt Peak | Spacewatch | · | 2.0 km | MPC · JPL |
| 472829 | 2015 FO_{182} | — | November 15, 2006 | Kitt Peak | Spacewatch | · | 1.0 km | MPC · JPL |
| 472830 | 2015 FL_{183} | — | June 14, 2012 | Mount Lemmon | Mount Lemmon Survey | · | 550 m | MPC · JPL |
| 472831 | 2015 FR_{184} | — | November 21, 2009 | Mount Lemmon | Mount Lemmon Survey | · | 1.9 km | MPC · JPL |
| 472832 | 2015 FU_{201} | — | February 17, 2004 | Kitt Peak | Spacewatch | NYS | 980 m | MPC · JPL |
| 472833 | 2015 FE_{214} | — | November 19, 2007 | Kitt Peak | Spacewatch | · | 2.7 km | MPC · JPL |
| 472834 | 2015 FX_{220} | — | December 25, 2005 | Kitt Peak | Spacewatch | · | 1.4 km | MPC · JPL |
| 472835 | 2015 FE_{224} | — | September 20, 2003 | Kitt Peak | Spacewatch | · | 1.8 km | MPC · JPL |
| 472836 | 2015 FB_{226} | — | September 30, 2013 | Mount Lemmon | Mount Lemmon Survey | · | 600 m | MPC · JPL |
| 472837 | 2015 FF_{231} | — | April 25, 2006 | Mount Lemmon | Mount Lemmon Survey | · | 1.9 km | MPC · JPL |
| 472838 | 2015 FT_{237} | — | December 4, 2007 | Mount Lemmon | Mount Lemmon Survey | · | 850 m | MPC · JPL |
| 472839 | 2015 FZ_{238} | — | March 13, 2007 | Mount Lemmon | Mount Lemmon Survey | · | 1.9 km | MPC · JPL |
| 472840 | 2015 FE_{239} | — | May 15, 2007 | Kitt Peak | Spacewatch | · | 1.9 km | MPC · JPL |
| 472841 | 2015 FN_{264} | — | March 1, 2008 | Kitt Peak | Spacewatch | · | 910 m | MPC · JPL |
| 472842 | 2015 FR_{271} | — | December 1, 2006 | Mount Lemmon | Mount Lemmon Survey | · | 1.3 km | MPC · JPL |
| 472843 | 2015 FX_{272} | — | March 25, 2007 | Mount Lemmon | Mount Lemmon Survey | · | 1.9 km | MPC · JPL |
| 472844 | 2015 FM_{275} | — | March 27, 2011 | Mount Lemmon | Mount Lemmon Survey | · | 1.3 km | MPC · JPL |
| 472845 | 2015 FE_{278} | — | April 18, 2001 | Kitt Peak | Spacewatch | · | 2.5 km | MPC · JPL |
| 472846 | 2015 FJ_{284} | — | March 27, 2004 | Kitt Peak | Spacewatch | · | 2.7 km | MPC · JPL |
| 472847 | 2015 FG_{285} | — | December 25, 2000 | Kitt Peak | Spacewatch | · | 780 m | MPC · JPL |
| 472848 | 2015 FY_{285} | — | April 14, 2004 | Kitt Peak | Spacewatch | · | 3.7 km | MPC · JPL |
| 472849 | 2015 FR_{286} | — | December 11, 2004 | Kitt Peak | Spacewatch | · | 2.2 km | MPC · JPL |
| 472850 | 2015 FD_{287} | — | January 7, 2010 | Mount Lemmon | Mount Lemmon Survey | JUN | 820 m | MPC · JPL |
| 472851 | 2015 FE_{287} | — | January 11, 1994 | Kitt Peak | Spacewatch | · | 1.3 km | MPC · JPL |
| 472852 | 2015 FB_{288} | — | April 9, 2010 | WISE | WISE | · | 2.5 km | MPC · JPL |
| 472853 | 2015 FH_{290} | — | September 16, 2012 | Catalina | CSS | · | 1.7 km | MPC · JPL |
| 472854 | 2015 FV_{292} | — | June 17, 2007 | Siding Spring | SSS | EUN | 1.6 km | MPC · JPL |
| 472855 | 2015 FC_{293} | — | November 1, 2006 | Mount Lemmon | Mount Lemmon Survey | · | 2.6 km | MPC · JPL |
| 472856 | 2015 FH_{293} | — | September 14, 2007 | Mount Lemmon | Mount Lemmon Survey | · | 2.7 km | MPC · JPL |
| 472857 | 2015 FK_{293} | — | October 19, 2003 | Kitt Peak | Spacewatch | · | 740 m | MPC · JPL |
| 472858 | 2015 FE_{294} | — | April 20, 2006 | Mount Lemmon | Mount Lemmon Survey | JUN | 760 m | MPC · JPL |
| 472859 | 2015 FQ_{294} | — | January 26, 2006 | Kitt Peak | Spacewatch | · | 1.5 km | MPC · JPL |
| 472860 | 2015 FB_{295} | — | June 12, 2005 | Kitt Peak | Spacewatch | · | 3.8 km | MPC · JPL |
| 472861 | 2015 FE_{295} | — | November 4, 2007 | Kitt Peak | Spacewatch | EOS | 2.2 km | MPC · JPL |
| 472862 | 2015 FY_{295} | — | September 23, 2006 | Kitt Peak | Spacewatch | EOS | 1.8 km | MPC · JPL |
| 472863 | 2015 FD_{296} | — | April 12, 2011 | Mount Lemmon | Mount Lemmon Survey | · | 1.5 km | MPC · JPL |
| 472864 | 2015 FE_{296} | — | December 29, 2008 | Mount Lemmon | Mount Lemmon Survey | · | 3.8 km | MPC · JPL |
| 472865 | 2015 FJ_{296} | — | January 24, 1996 | Kitt Peak | Spacewatch | GEF | 1.6 km | MPC · JPL |
| 472866 | 2015 FZ_{296} | — | February 4, 2009 | Mount Lemmon | Mount Lemmon Survey | EOS | 2.4 km | MPC · JPL |
| 472867 | 2015 FB_{297} | — | April 23, 2010 | WISE | WISE | LIX | 2.3 km | MPC · JPL |
| 472868 | 2015 FY_{298} | — | January 30, 2006 | Kitt Peak | Spacewatch | T_{j} (2.99) · 3:2 | 4.9 km | MPC · JPL |
| 472869 | 2015 FB_{299} | — | November 19, 2009 | Kitt Peak | Spacewatch | KON | 3.1 km | MPC · JPL |
| 472870 | 2015 FP_{301} | — | April 24, 2007 | Mount Lemmon | Mount Lemmon Survey | · | 1.2 km | MPC · JPL |
| 472871 | 2015 FW_{301} | — | December 5, 2007 | Kitt Peak | Spacewatch | EOS | 2.2 km | MPC · JPL |
| 472872 | 2015 FD_{302} | — | March 29, 2009 | Catalina | CSS | · | 2.1 km | MPC · JPL |
| 472873 | 2015 FJ_{302} | — | January 8, 2010 | Mount Lemmon | Mount Lemmon Survey | · | 1.4 km | MPC · JPL |
| 472874 | 2015 FO_{302} | — | March 1, 2009 | Mount Lemmon | Mount Lemmon Survey | EOS | 1.9 km | MPC · JPL |
| 472875 | 2015 FT_{302} | — | February 26, 2003 | Campo Imperatore | CINEOS | · | 3.0 km | MPC · JPL |
| 472876 | 2015 FY_{304} | — | April 28, 2010 | WISE | WISE | · | 4.0 km | MPC · JPL |
| 472877 | 2015 FO_{307} | — | December 20, 2007 | Kitt Peak | Spacewatch | · | 3.7 km | MPC · JPL |
| 472878 | 2015 FW_{309} | — | September 4, 2008 | Kitt Peak | Spacewatch | · | 1.3 km | MPC · JPL |
| 472879 | 2015 FG_{310} | — | January 11, 2011 | Kitt Peak | Spacewatch | · | 1.0 km | MPC · JPL |
| 472880 | 2015 FZ_{313} | — | June 6, 2005 | Kitt Peak | Spacewatch | V | 570 m | MPC · JPL |
| 472881 | 2015 FK_{314} | — | April 21, 2012 | Mount Lemmon | Mount Lemmon Survey | · | 870 m | MPC · JPL |
| 472882 | 2015 FH_{315} | — | August 21, 2008 | Kitt Peak | Spacewatch | · | 1.2 km | MPC · JPL |
| 472883 | 2015 FR_{315} | — | February 5, 2009 | Kitt Peak | Spacewatch | · | 2.3 km | MPC · JPL |
| 472884 | 2015 FN_{317} | — | February 16, 2010 | Kitt Peak | Spacewatch | · | 1.7 km | MPC · JPL |
| 472885 | 2015 FA_{318} | — | September 28, 2009 | Mount Lemmon | Mount Lemmon Survey | · | 1.3 km | MPC · JPL |
| 472886 | 2015 FT_{318} | — | December 6, 2010 | Mount Lemmon | Mount Lemmon Survey | · | 690 m | MPC · JPL |
| 472887 | 2015 FS_{321} | — | May 16, 2010 | Mount Lemmon | Mount Lemmon Survey | THB | 3.0 km | MPC · JPL |
| 472888 | 2015 FH_{323} | — | December 19, 2004 | Mount Lemmon | Mount Lemmon Survey | · | 2.1 km | MPC · JPL |
| 472889 | 2015 FQ_{323} | — | January 22, 1993 | Kitt Peak | Spacewatch | · | 1.2 km | MPC · JPL |
| 472890 | 2015 FT_{325} | — | May 23, 2006 | Kitt Peak | Spacewatch | DOR | 2.2 km | MPC · JPL |
| 472891 | 2015 FB_{326} | — | November 21, 2008 | Kitt Peak | Spacewatch | · | 1.8 km | MPC · JPL |
| 472892 | 2015 FO_{326} | — | November 2, 2008 | Mount Lemmon | Mount Lemmon Survey | PAD | 1.8 km | MPC · JPL |
| 472893 | 2015 FT_{326} | — | November 8, 2007 | Mount Lemmon | Mount Lemmon Survey | · | 1.8 km | MPC · JPL |
| 472894 | 2015 FC_{327} | — | January 5, 2000 | Kitt Peak | Spacewatch | · | 910 m | MPC · JPL |
| 472895 | 2015 FU_{327} | — | October 10, 2007 | Mount Lemmon | Mount Lemmon Survey | · | 2.6 km | MPC · JPL |
| 472896 | 2015 FA_{329} | — | January 28, 2007 | Mount Lemmon | Mount Lemmon Survey | · | 3.2 km | MPC · JPL |
| 472897 | 2015 FM_{331} | — | October 1, 2005 | Mount Lemmon | Mount Lemmon Survey | · | 1.2 km | MPC · JPL |
| 472898 | 2015 FD_{332} | — | January 2, 2011 | Mount Lemmon | Mount Lemmon Survey | · | 1.7 km | MPC · JPL |
| 472899 | 2015 FF_{334} | — | September 25, 2006 | Mount Lemmon | Mount Lemmon Survey | · | 1.7 km | MPC · JPL |
| 472900 | 2015 FD_{336} | — | October 9, 1999 | Socorro | LINEAR | · | 1.9 km | MPC · JPL |

== 472901–473000 ==
back to top

| Designation | | | Discovery | | | Properties | | Ref |
| Permanent | Provisional | Named after | Date | Site | Discoverer(s) | Category | Diam. | Ref |
|---|---|---|---|---|---|---|---|---|
| 472901 | 2015 FA_{338} | — | September 17, 2006 | Kitt Peak | Spacewatch | · | 2.9 km | MPC · JPL |
| 472902 | 2015 FS_{340} | — | November 2, 2007 | Kitt Peak | Spacewatch | · | 2.5 km | MPC · JPL |
| 472903 | 2015 FU_{340} | — | November 1, 2007 | Kitt Peak | Spacewatch | · | 2.5 km | MPC · JPL |
| 472904 | 2015 FK_{341} | — | March 27, 2008 | Kitt Peak | Spacewatch | · | 1.3 km | MPC · JPL |
| 472905 | 2015 FO_{341} | — | October 2, 2008 | Kitt Peak | Spacewatch | · | 1.9 km | MPC · JPL |
| 472906 | 2015 FR_{341} | — | October 24, 2008 | Catalina | CSS | EUN | 2.0 km | MPC · JPL |
| 472907 | 2015 FS_{341} | — | October 31, 2008 | Mount Lemmon | Mount Lemmon Survey | EUN | 1.6 km | MPC · JPL |
| 472908 | 2015 FL_{342} | — | December 25, 2005 | Mount Lemmon | Mount Lemmon Survey | · | 1.9 km | MPC · JPL |
| 472909 | 2015 FN_{343} | — | March 13, 2002 | Socorro | LINEAR | · | 1.8 km | MPC · JPL |
| 472910 | 2015 FA_{344} | — | March 26, 2011 | Kitt Peak | Spacewatch | · | 1.3 km | MPC · JPL |
| 472911 | 2015 FK_{344} | — | May 10, 2007 | Kitt Peak | Spacewatch | · | 1.1 km | MPC · JPL |
| 472912 | 2015 FQ_{344} | — | October 9, 2005 | Kitt Peak | Spacewatch | · | 1.6 km | MPC · JPL |
| 472913 | 2015 GR_{2} | — | November 16, 2006 | Mount Lemmon | Mount Lemmon Survey | · | 3.1 km | MPC · JPL |
| 472914 | 2015 GT_{2} | — | April 2, 2005 | Mount Lemmon | Mount Lemmon Survey | · | 770 m | MPC · JPL |
| 472915 | 2015 GU_{2} | — | March 5, 2008 | Kitt Peak | Spacewatch | · | 890 m | MPC · JPL |
| 472916 | 2015 GT_{3} | — | October 31, 2008 | Kitt Peak | Spacewatch | (12739) | 1.5 km | MPC · JPL |
| 472917 | 2015 GZ_{3} | — | August 27, 2006 | Kitt Peak | Spacewatch | · | 570 m | MPC · JPL |
| 472918 | 2015 GX_{4} | — | November 4, 2007 | Kitt Peak | Spacewatch | · | 1.7 km | MPC · JPL |
| 472919 | 2015 GJ_{5} | — | October 31, 2006 | Mount Lemmon | Mount Lemmon Survey | · | 2.9 km | MPC · JPL |
| 472920 | 2015 GS_{7} | — | March 8, 2010 | WISE | WISE | · | 1.2 km | MPC · JPL |
| 472921 | 2015 GS_{9} | — | April 11, 2007 | Catalina | CSS | · | 1.5 km | MPC · JPL |
| 472922 | 2015 GF_{10} | — | April 17, 2007 | Catalina | CSS | · | 1.6 km | MPC · JPL |
| 472923 | 2015 GM_{16} | — | February 10, 2010 | Kitt Peak | Spacewatch | · | 1.6 km | MPC · JPL |
| 472924 | 2015 GW_{16} | — | March 9, 2005 | Mount Lemmon | Mount Lemmon Survey | · | 1.4 km | MPC · JPL |
| 472925 | 2015 GM_{18} | — | May 19, 2010 | Mount Lemmon | Mount Lemmon Survey | EOS | 1.6 km | MPC · JPL |
| 472926 | 2015 GS_{18} | — | March 20, 2007 | Kitt Peak | Spacewatch | · | 1.1 km | MPC · JPL |
| 472927 | 2015 GC_{20} | — | January 28, 2011 | Catalina | CSS | · | 1.2 km | MPC · JPL |
| 472928 | 2015 GM_{20} | — | February 29, 2008 | Kitt Peak | Spacewatch | · | 810 m | MPC · JPL |
| 472929 | 2015 GO_{20} | — | October 4, 1999 | Kitt Peak | Spacewatch | · | 770 m | MPC · JPL |
| 472930 | 2015 GS_{20} | — | March 5, 2006 | Kitt Peak | Spacewatch | · | 1.4 km | MPC · JPL |
| 472931 | 2015 GZ_{20} | — | November 30, 2005 | Mount Lemmon | Mount Lemmon Survey | · | 1.3 km | MPC · JPL |
| 472932 | 2015 GC_{22} | — | April 9, 2006 | Mount Lemmon | Mount Lemmon Survey | · | 1.8 km | MPC · JPL |
| 472933 | 2015 GL_{23} | — | March 16, 2004 | Socorro | LINEAR | · | 3.1 km | MPC · JPL |
| 472934 | 2015 GT_{23} | — | December 18, 2007 | Mount Lemmon | Mount Lemmon Survey | · | 3.4 km | MPC · JPL |
| 472935 | 2015 GZ_{23} | — | January 28, 2014 | Mount Lemmon | Mount Lemmon Survey | · | 2.1 km | MPC · JPL |
| 472936 | 2015 GB_{24} | — | January 31, 2006 | Catalina | CSS | · | 1.6 km | MPC · JPL |
| 472937 | 2015 GU_{24} | — | August 26, 2012 | Kitt Peak | Spacewatch | · | 2.0 km | MPC · JPL |
| 472938 | 2015 GG_{25} | — | January 24, 2010 | WISE | WISE | NAE | 2.7 km | MPC · JPL |
| 472939 | 2015 GQ_{25} | — | December 30, 2013 | Mount Lemmon | Mount Lemmon Survey | · | 1.8 km | MPC · JPL |
| 472940 | 2015 GV_{25} | — | December 10, 2004 | Kitt Peak | Spacewatch | · | 2.2 km | MPC · JPL |
| 472941 | 2015 GA_{26} | — | April 7, 2010 | WISE | WISE | · | 4.7 km | MPC · JPL |
| 472942 | 2015 GU_{26} | — | April 2, 2006 | Anderson Mesa | LONEOS | · | 2.5 km | MPC · JPL |
| 472943 | 2015 GL_{27} | — | March 3, 2000 | Kitt Peak | Spacewatch | NYS | 1.2 km | MPC · JPL |
| 472944 | 2015 GH_{28} | — | March 10, 1999 | Kitt Peak | Spacewatch | · | 2.3 km | MPC · JPL |
| 472945 | 2015 GV_{28} | — | May 22, 2011 | Mount Lemmon | Mount Lemmon Survey | 526 | 2.2 km | MPC · JPL |
| 472946 | 2015 GD_{29} | — | October 4, 2007 | Kitt Peak | Spacewatch | · | 2.2 km | MPC · JPL |
| 472947 | 2015 GV_{29} | — | March 17, 2004 | Kitt Peak | Spacewatch | · | 2.2 km | MPC · JPL |
| 472948 | 2015 GE_{30} | — | March 23, 2004 | Kitt Peak | Spacewatch | · | 900 m | MPC · JPL |
| 472949 | 2015 GV_{30} | — | January 30, 2006 | Kitt Peak | Spacewatch | · | 1.4 km | MPC · JPL |
| 472950 | 2015 GC_{31} | — | October 22, 2003 | Kitt Peak | Spacewatch | · | 1.9 km | MPC · JPL |
| 472951 | 2015 GE_{31} | — | September 12, 2007 | Mount Lemmon | Mount Lemmon Survey | · | 2.0 km | MPC · JPL |
| 472952 | 2015 GV_{31} | — | March 4, 2005 | Catalina | CSS | · | 690 m | MPC · JPL |
| 472953 | 2015 GW_{31} | — | April 9, 2010 | Mount Lemmon | Mount Lemmon Survey | · | 1.7 km | MPC · JPL |
| 472954 | 2015 GE_{32} | — | March 5, 2006 | Kitt Peak | Spacewatch | · | 1.8 km | MPC · JPL |
| 472955 | 2015 GN_{32} | — | August 13, 2007 | Siding Spring | SSS | · | 2.4 km | MPC · JPL |
| 472956 | 2015 GJ_{33} | — | February 16, 2010 | WISE | WISE | · | 1.3 km | MPC · JPL |
| 472957 | 2015 GQ_{33} | — | November 18, 2009 | Kitt Peak | Spacewatch | · | 1.8 km | MPC · JPL |
| 472958 | 2015 GF_{34} | — | November 23, 2006 | Mount Lemmon | Mount Lemmon Survey | · | 950 m | MPC · JPL |
| 472959 | 2015 GK_{34} | — | February 25, 2006 | Anderson Mesa | LONEOS | ADE | 2.3 km | MPC · JPL |
| 472960 | 2015 GP_{37} | — | September 15, 2012 | Catalina | CSS | · | 1.7 km | MPC · JPL |
| 472961 | 2015 GS_{37} | — | December 19, 2004 | Mount Lemmon | Mount Lemmon Survey | AGN | 1.2 km | MPC · JPL |
| 472962 | 2015 GK_{38} | — | January 20, 2009 | Kitt Peak | Spacewatch | · | 2.0 km | MPC · JPL |
| 472963 | 2015 GL_{38} | — | March 2, 2011 | Kitt Peak | Spacewatch | · | 1.3 km | MPC · JPL |
| 472964 | 2015 GA_{39} | — | November 18, 2006 | Mount Lemmon | Mount Lemmon Survey | CYB | 3.7 km | MPC · JPL |
| 472965 | 2015 GE_{39} | — | October 5, 2004 | Anderson Mesa | LONEOS | RAF | 1.2 km | MPC · JPL |
| 472966 | 2015 GG_{39} | — | February 16, 2002 | Kitt Peak | Spacewatch | · | 1.8 km | MPC · JPL |
| 472967 | 2015 GL_{39} | — | November 16, 2006 | Kitt Peak | Spacewatch | V | 570 m | MPC · JPL |
| 472968 | 2015 GS_{40} | — | April 4, 2008 | Kitt Peak | Spacewatch | V | 620 m | MPC · JPL |
| 472969 | 2015 GA_{41} | — | December 17, 2009 | Mount Lemmon | Mount Lemmon Survey | · | 1.9 km | MPC · JPL |
| 472970 | 2015 GM_{41} | — | February 14, 2010 | Kitt Peak | Spacewatch | · | 2.1 km | MPC · JPL |
| 472971 | 2015 GX_{42} | — | September 29, 2009 | Mount Lemmon | Mount Lemmon Survey | · | 1.3 km | MPC · JPL |
| 472972 | 2015 GE_{44} | — | April 2, 2006 | Kitt Peak | Spacewatch | AEO | 1.2 km | MPC · JPL |
| 472973 | 2015 GF_{44} | — | November 12, 2012 | Mount Lemmon | Mount Lemmon Survey | · | 3.0 km | MPC · JPL |
| 472974 | 2015 GO_{44} | — | October 6, 2008 | Mount Lemmon | Mount Lemmon Survey | AGN | 1.0 km | MPC · JPL |
| 472975 | 2015 GD_{50} | — | March 18, 2010 | Mount Lemmon | Mount Lemmon Survey | DOR | 3.2 km | MPC · JPL |
| 472976 | 2015 GG_{50} | — | October 7, 2008 | Mount Lemmon | Mount Lemmon Survey | · | 2.9 km | MPC · JPL |
| 472977 | 2015 HX_{1} | — | February 14, 2010 | Mount Lemmon | Mount Lemmon Survey | · | 2.0 km | MPC · JPL |
| 472978 | 2015 HO_{3} | — | January 20, 2006 | Kitt Peak | Spacewatch | · | 2.2 km | MPC · JPL |
| 472979 | 2015 HP_{3} | — | October 29, 2008 | Kitt Peak | Spacewatch | · | 1.8 km | MPC · JPL |
| 472980 | 2015 HP_{4} | — | January 2, 2009 | Kitt Peak | Spacewatch | EOS | 2.4 km | MPC · JPL |
| 472981 | 2015 HZ_{8} | — | February 2, 2006 | Kitt Peak | Spacewatch | · | 1.5 km | MPC · JPL |
| 472982 | 2015 HP_{11} | — | March 3, 2009 | Catalina | CSS | · | 3.3 km | MPC · JPL |
| 472983 | 2015 HV_{12} | — | August 28, 2006 | Kitt Peak | Spacewatch | · | 1.8 km | MPC · JPL |
| 472984 | 2015 HZ_{12} | — | January 12, 2010 | Kitt Peak | Spacewatch | · | 2.3 km | MPC · JPL |
| 472985 | 2015 HB_{13} | — | April 10, 2010 | Mount Lemmon | Mount Lemmon Survey | · | 1.5 km | MPC · JPL |
| 472986 | 2015 HT_{14} | — | March 17, 2004 | Kitt Peak | Spacewatch | EOS | 1.8 km | MPC · JPL |
| 472987 | 2015 HU_{14} | — | September 12, 2007 | Kitt Peak | Spacewatch | · | 2.3 km | MPC · JPL |
| 472988 | 2015 HO_{15} | — | February 24, 2009 | Catalina | CSS | · | 4.0 km | MPC · JPL |
| 472989 | 2015 HL_{17} | — | January 19, 2004 | Kitt Peak | Spacewatch | · | 820 m | MPC · JPL |
| 472990 | 2015 HM_{20} | — | April 12, 2004 | Kitt Peak | Spacewatch | · | 1.3 km | MPC · JPL |
| 472991 | 2015 HG_{21} | — | March 11, 2011 | Kitt Peak | Spacewatch | NYS | 1.0 km | MPC · JPL |
| 472992 | 2015 HJ_{21} | — | March 17, 2004 | Kitt Peak | Spacewatch | NYS | 910 m | MPC · JPL |
| 472993 | 2015 HT_{21} | — | March 9, 2006 | Kitt Peak | Spacewatch | · | 1.9 km | MPC · JPL |
| 472994 | 2015 HJ_{22} | — | May 21, 2006 | Mount Lemmon | Mount Lemmon Survey | · | 2.2 km | MPC · JPL |
| 472995 | 2015 HR_{23} | — | October 22, 2008 | Mount Lemmon | Mount Lemmon Survey | · | 2.1 km | MPC · JPL |
| 472996 | 2015 HH_{24} | — | October 22, 2006 | Kitt Peak | Spacewatch | · | 3.1 km | MPC · JPL |
| 472997 | 2015 HU_{28} | — | August 18, 2006 | Kitt Peak | Spacewatch | · | 3.0 km | MPC · JPL |
| 472998 | 2015 HD_{29} | — | February 22, 2006 | Catalina | CSS | · | 1.8 km | MPC · JPL |
| 472999 | 2015 HL_{29} | — | May 2, 2003 | Kitt Peak | Spacewatch | · | 2.7 km | MPC · JPL |
| 473000 | 2015 HU_{29} | — | June 12, 2007 | Kitt Peak | Spacewatch | · | 1.6 km | MPC · JPL |

back to top

== Meaning of names ==
As minor planet discoveries are confirmed, they are given a permanent number by the IAU's Minor Planet Center (MPC), and the discoverers can then submit names for them, following the IAU's naming conventions. The list below concerns those minor planets in the specified number-range that have received names, and explains the meanings of those names.

Official naming citations of newly named small Solar System bodies are approved and published in a bulletin by IAU's Working Group for Small Bodies Nomenclature (WGSBN). Before May 2021, citations were published in MPC's Minor Planet Circulars for many decades. Recent citations can also be found on the JPL Small-Body Database (SBDB). Until his death in 2016, German astronomer Lutz D. Schmadel compiled these citations into the Dictionary of Minor Planet Names (DMP) and regularly updated the collection.

Based on Paul Herget's The Names of the Minor Planets, Schmadel also researched the unclear origin of numerous asteroids, most of which had been named prior to World War II. This article incorporates text from this source, which is in the public domain: SBDB New namings may only be added to this list below after official publication as the preannouncement of names is condemned. The WGSBN publishes a comprehensive guideline for the naming rules of non-cometary small Solar System bodies.

| Named minor planet | Provisional | This minor planet was named for... | Ref · Catalog |
|---|---|---|---|
| 472054 Tupaia | 2013 YA_{55} | Tupaia (c. 1725–1770), a navigator and arioi from Raiatea who guided HMS Endeavour during her Pacific voyage. | IAU · 472054 |
| 472235 Zhulong | 2014 GE_{45} | Zhulong ("Torch Dragon") is a creature from Chinese mythology with a human face and scarlet serpent body. It controlled the day and night of the world by opening and closing its eyes. It is described in classic Chinese literature as shining a torch over "the ninefold darkness." | JPL · 472235 |
