= Harari (surname) =

Harari is a surname of multiple origins.

Harari (Hebrew: הָרָארִי) is a Jewish surname that can be translated from Hebrew as 'mountainous' or as 'mountain dweller' (cf. Bergmann).

It is also found among the Harari people from the city of Harar in Ethiopia.

== People ==
- Shamah ben Ageh Harari (aka Shammah) (Hebrew: שַׁמָּה בֶּן־אָגֵא הַהֲרָרִי), one of King David's Warriors (fl. 1010 BCE – 970 BCE)
- Alberto Harari (musician), Argentine musician, composer and lyricist
- Alberto Harari, Mexican jockey
- Abdullah al-Harari (Arabic: عبد الله بن محمَّد بن يوسف بن عبد الله بن جامع الشَّيبي العبدري الهرري) (1906–2008), Ethiopian Harari scholar, founder in Lebanon of the Habashi (Al Ahbash) Order
- Arthur Harari (Hebrew: אַרְתּוּר הָרָארִי) (born 1981), French film director, screenwriter and actor
- Catherine Dreyfus, Catherine Dreyfus-Harari (Hebrew: קָתְרִין דְּרֵיְפוּס, קָתְרִין דְּרֵיְפוּס-הָרָארִי), French journalist
- Clément Harari (Hebrew: קְלֵמַנְט הָרָארִי) (1919–2008), Egyptian-French film and television actor
- Eli Harari, Israeli-American business executive
- Hananiah Harari (Hebrew: חֲנַנְיָה הָרָארִי) (1912–2000), American painter and illustrator
- Haim Harari (educator), né Shneur Zalman Blumberg, one of the founders of Tel Aviv
- Haim Harari (Hebrew: חַיִּים הָרָארִי) (1940), Israeli scientist, after whom the Harari Rishon Model is named; President of the Weizmann Institute of Science
- Ilan Harari (Hebrew: אִילָן הָרָארִי) (1959), former Israeli brigadier general
- Manya Harari, née Benenson, British translator of Russian literature
- Michael Harari (Hebrew: מִיכָאֵל (מַיְיק) הָרָארִי) (1927–2014), Israeli intelligence officer
- Jon Harari (Hebrew: ג'וֹן הָרָארִי), CEO of WindowsWear
- Oren Harari, Israeli-American author
- Ovadia Harari, Egyptian-Israeli aerospace engineer
- Renee Harari Masri, Mexican designer
- Robert Harari (Hebrew: רוֹבֶּרְט הָרָארִי) (born 1976), American film director
- Simone Harari Baulieu (Hebrew: סִימוֹן הָרָארִי בּוֹלְיֶיה), French producer
- Tom Harari (Hebrew: תּוֹם הָרָארִי), French cinematographer
- Yehudit Harari, née Eisenberg, educator, teacher, kindergarten teacher, and writer, one of the founders of Tel Aviv
- Yizhar Harari (Hebrew: יִזְהַר הֲרָרִי) (1908–1978), Zionist activist and Israeli politician
- Yuval Noah Harari (Hebrew: יוּבָל נוֹחַ הָרָארִי) (1976), historian, based at the Hebrew University of Jerusalem
- Zaki Harari (Arabic: كي حريري, Hebrew: זאכי הררי, זוזי הררי, זאכי סאלים) (1926–1979), Jewish Egyptian Olympic basketball player

== See also ==
- Harari Tel Aviv F.C.
- Harari Rishon Model
- 495287 Harari
- Harary, Jewish surname
- Hariri, Arab surname
- Harari
