= Harari =

Harari may refer to:

- Harari people, ethnic group in Ethiopia
- Harari language, an Ethiopian Semitic language
- Harari Region, a state in Ethiopia
- Harari (surname), of multiple origins
  - Yuval Noah Harari, an Israeli historian
  - Haim Harari, an Israeli physicist
- Harari Rishon Model, a model in physics named after Haim Harari

== See also ==
- Mbare, formerly Harari, a township in Zimbabwe
- Harari, an Afro-soul band led by Sipho Mabuse ("Hotstix")
- Hariri (disambiguation)
- Harary
