= Harary =

Harary is a last name of Jews of Moroccan and Syrian descent. Notable people with the surname include:

- Charlie Harary, American investor, strategic adviser and professor
- Frank Harary, American graph theorist
- Franz Harary (born 1962), American magician and inventor
- Ronnen Harary, Canadian billionaire businessman

== See also ==
- Harari (disambiguation)
