= Charlie Harary =

American businessman (born 1977)

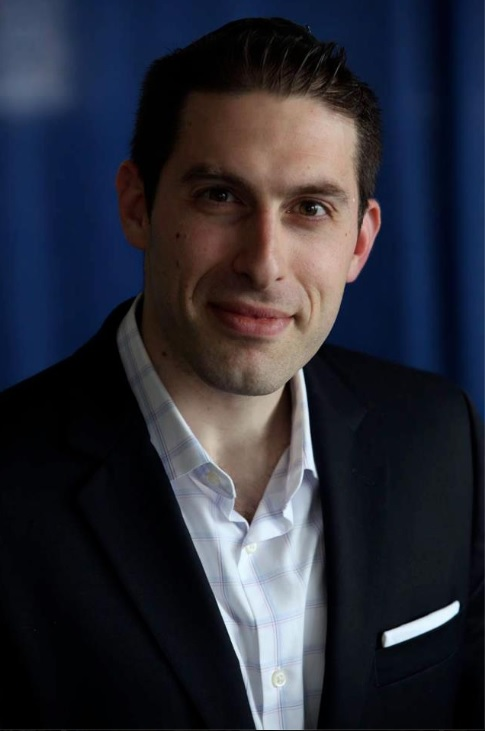
- Born: July 1977 (age 49)
- Education: Queens College (BA); Columbia Law School (JD)
- Occupations: Investor; Strategic Adviser; Professor; Motivational Speaker; Radio Show Host; Television Personality
- Known for: Motivational Speaking; Radio Show Hosting; Television Personality
- Website: charlieharary.com

Charles Harary (born July 1977) is an American investor, strategic adviser and professor who has gained fame as a motivational speaker, radio show host, and television personality. He is an Orthodox Jew.

== Education ==
Harary received his bachelor's degree in political science and communications from Queens College, graduating magna cum laude. He then attended Columbia Law School, where he was a James Kent Scholar and a Harlan Fiske Stone Scholar.

== Career ==
Harary is the Senior Director of Capital Markets at RXR Realty, a real estate company based in New York. Prior to that, Harary co-founded H3 & Company, a venture capital and advisory firm based in New York. Prior to H3 Capital, Harary was a vice president at RXR Realty. Prior to that, he worked as an associate at Paul, Weiss, Rifkind, Wharton & Garrison and Davis Polk & Wardwell.

Harary gives speeches on topics of personal growth, business strategy and productivity. He hosts a weekly podcast entitled The Charlie Harary Show on TheBlaze Radio Network. Prior to airing on TheBlaze Radio Network, The Charlie Harary Show aired Saturday nights on WABC. Harary also hosts The Boardroom, a weekly business-centered radio show on the Nachum Segal Network. He also hosts a podcast entitled, Unlocking Greatness where he interviews successful entrepreneurs, thought leaders, change agents, influencers and experts, intending to understand how they achieved their success.

In May 2015, Harary launched #TheAskCharlieShow, a video based question-and-answer show where he answers questions submitted by the audience pertaining to issues of personal growth and productivity found in the business setting. He has contributed to several publications, including: Inc., Entrepreneur, Forbes, U.S. News & World Report, Monster.com, All Business Experts, TechRepublic, Daily News, and The Intelligencer.

Harary is a Clinical Professor of Management and Entrepreneurship and an Associate Entrepreneur in Residence at the Syms School of Business at Yeshiva University.

In 2026, after learning with a Rabbi in Bnei Brak for 10 years, he started a podcast called "Dialing Bnei Brak" where he presents edited and guided versions of their phone calls where they tackle important and relevant issues both for the current generation and in general.
