= Alberto Harari (musician) =

Argentine musician

- Born: 1932; Argentina
- Died: 2002 (aged 69–70)
- Genres: Tango
- Occupations: Musician, composer, lyricist
- Years active: 1960s–1970s

Alberto Harari (1932 - 2002, Buenos Aires) was an Argentine musician, composer and lyricist, popular mainly in the 1960s and 1970s in the tango genre. Among his main compositions are "El Vuelo Ciento Dos", in partnership with Juan Tiggi, and "Ordenando Fracasos", in partnership with Carlos Peraltas, and interpreted by Daniel Oliveira. His greatest success was "Solamente Tu”, composed in partnership with Agustín Irusta and performed by Agustín Irusta and the Cuarteto Guardia Vieja, on the 1970 album "El Gato Del Amor".
