= Renee Harari Masri =

Mexican designer (born 1978)

Renee Harari Masri (born 1978) is a Mexican designer.

== Biography ==
MA Renée Harari Masri was born in Mexico City in 1978. She obtained her bachelor's degree in Industrial design with a sub-specialty in interior design + set design in 2001 at the Universidad Iberoamericana in Mexico City. One year later she obtained her master's degree in "Art, Space and Ephimeral Architecture" offered by Politechnic University of Catalonia in Barcelona, Spain. In 2003, she studied a bachelor's degree in photography at the Institut de Estudis Fotográficos de Catalunya in Barcelona, Spain.

She possesses 15 years of experience in the elaboration of products and image design, and the additional use and technique of different materials in artistic elaboration. She also has specialization studies in Technical and Artistic Photography and multiple courses in Art, Drawing, Photography, Color Theory, Sculpture, Ceramics, Art History etc. throughout her career in different national and international institutions.

From 2004 to present day, she has her own Design Studio, MARACADESIGN, that specializes in Industrial Design, Graphic Design, Photography, Set Design, Visual Merchandising and Interior Design with offices in Barcelona and Mexico City. She also has a Photography Collective named Dayan+Harari+Photography. Additionally, she collaborates with the Photography and Interior Intervention studio INTERVALART in Mexico City, and also the Interior and Industrial Design studio of ANTONI AROLA in Barcelona.

== Courses and Workshops ==
She has given national and international courses among which are: Workshops for interior design / stage "The Marketing of the Senses", "To See and not Be Seen", "Leit Motif", "Intimate The Intimate", "Tacit Archigraphy", etc.. at graduate and undergraduate level for The Colegiatura Colombiana in collaboration with The Chamber of Commerce in Medellin, Colombia biannually since 2007. Workshop "The Black Hole" for professional thesis: FPC, Barcelona 2009. Signaling Workshop for Design: Colegio Hatikva, Barcelona, 2009. "Introduction to Industrial Design" Hatikva School, Barcelona. Workshops "The Black Hole", "The Habit of Dwelling", "Stereoscopic Space", etc. at graduate and undergraduate level, Pontificial Bolivarian University, in Medellin, Colombia since 2005. Additionally she has worked regularly teaching a pottery workshop for children, children's drawing courses and visual arts courses for children. She currently is a professor at The Universidad Iberoamericana in the Design Department in Mexico City and in the Panamerican University in the Engineering Department, also in Mexico City.

== Awards ==
She has received awards and honors such as numerous selections for the Laus Awards: Among them, Revista Número Cero + Havana Marketing. First place and honorable mention in the contest Wares, Iberoamerican University. First place in visual arts contest, Runnels, Baton Rouge, LA, USA. First place in drawing contest implemented on cartons for Kleinpeter milk released in 87-92, USA.

== Publications and exhibitions ==
-The Book publication and subsequent exposition at Estación Indianilla Cultural Center in Mexico City in 2013; MXPM: Mexico City by Night, Renee Harari Harari Masri + Eduardo Dayan. ed. Independiente, México, 2013. -The Book: "Renee Harari Masri Photography", ed. Independent, México, 2010. -The Book: "ADG-FAD Laus Awards 2008", Havana stationery Mktg. + Magazine Number Zero, ed. FAD: Foment del Arts I del Disseny, 2008. -The Book: "Art Book", Loring Art, Barcelona. 2008. -The Magazine: ep (s) El País Semanal, "A New Town", light-box, pg. Extra 84-89 Spring May 28. Spain, 2006. -The Magazine: Proyecto Contract no. 6, "Leonardo y la Música", pg. 57-65. Spain, 2006. -The Magazine: ARMI Magazine, St. Ettienne exhibition, International Design, Photograph "A la Víbora, Víbora de la Mar". 2000. -The Exhibition: MXPM: Mexico City by Night, 350 pieces, Hotel Presidente Intercontinental, Mexico City, 2012. -The Exhibition: Photo Novel for the Teatro Lliure de Montjuic . Work: Photo booth / "The Malentés" by Albert Camus. 2006. -The Exhibition: "e = mc2 Visuals Proyectes Mostra 05, Els Temps: the Paraula to Imatge" Work: Top View 0.2., Centro Cultural Pati LLimona, Barcelona, 2005. -The Exhibition: "Industrial Design", Casa Lamm, Alvaro Obregon, Mexico City. 2001.

== See also ==
- Universidad Iberoamericana
- Universidad Panamericana
