= Alberto Harari =

Mexican jockey

Alberto Harari (born 15 September 1970 in Mexico City) is a Mexican jockey currently based in Spain. Alberto Harari started his career as a jockey in his teens in Mexico City, and gained international prominence in 2010. In 2013, Alberto Harari won the Andalucía Championship with his horse Calimero. In 2017, he was the winner of the Gran Premio Turístico de Murcia Costa Cálida with Fortín. In the same year, he also occupied the first position in the sixth edition of the Aros Winter Cup.
