= List of minor planets: 495001–496000 =

The following is a partial list of minor planets, running from minor-planet number 495001 through 496000, inclusive. The primary data for this and other partial lists is based on JPL's "Small-Body Orbital Elements" and data available from the Minor Planet Center. Critical list information is also provided by the MPC, unless otherwise specified from Lowell Observatory. A detailed description of the table's columns and additional sources are given on the main page including a complete list of every page in this series, and a statistical break-up on the dynamical classification of minor planets.

Also see the summary list of all named bodies in numerical and alphabetical order, and the corresponding naming citations for the number range of this particular list. New namings may only be added to this list after official publication, as the preannouncement of names is condemned by the Working Group for Small Bodies Nomenclature of the International Astronomical Union.

Near-Earth obj.	MBA (inner)	MBA (outer)	Centaur
Mars-crosser	MBA (middle)	Jupiter trojan	Trans-Neptunian obj.
Unclassified

== 495001–495100 ==
Designation			Discovery			Properties		Ref
Permanent	Provisional	Named after	Date	Site	Discoverer(s)	Category	Diam.	Ref
495001	2010 JP_{48}	—	May 6, 2010	Mount Lemmon	Mount Lemmon Survey	PHO	750 m	MPC · JPL
495002	2010 JA_{78}	—	May 11, 2010	Mount Lemmon	Mount Lemmon Survey	·	630 m	MPC · JPL
495003	2010 JT_{80}	—	May 13, 2010	Catalina	CSS	PHO	1.1 km	MPC · JPL
495004	2010 KD_{50}	—	May 22, 2010	WISE	WISE	ERI	1.5 km	MPC · JPL
495005	2010 KJ_{125}	—	June 5, 2010	WISE	WISE	·	1.3 km	MPC · JPL
495006	2010 LV_{1}	—	June 1, 2010	WISE	WISE	·	1.3 km	MPC · JPL
495007	2010 MX_{63}	—	June 24, 2010	WISE	WISE	·	2.3 km	MPC · JPL
495008	2010 MQ_{77}	—	June 23, 2010	Mount Lemmon	Mount Lemmon Survey	·	1.9 km	MPC · JPL
495009	2010 MW_{85}	—	June 27, 2010	WISE	WISE	SYL · CYB	5.0 km	MPC · JPL
495010	2010 MA_{112}	—	June 18, 2010	Mount Lemmon	Mount Lemmon Survey	MAS	600 m	MPC · JPL
495011	2010 OB_{57}	—	March 13, 2008	Kitt Peak	Spacewatch	·	2.2 km	MPC · JPL
495012	2010 PA_{57}	—	August 10, 2010	Kitt Peak	Spacewatch	EOS	1.8 km	MPC · JPL
495013	2010 RZ_{64}	—	August 10, 2010	Kitt Peak	Spacewatch	NYS	920 m	MPC · JPL
495014	2010 RG_{73}	—	September 10, 2010	Catalina	CSS	·	1 km	MPC · JPL
495015	2010 RP_{81}	—	September 11, 2010	La Sagra	OAM	·	1.0 km	MPC · JPL
495016	2010 RL_{120}	—	October 1, 1999	Kitt Peak	Spacewatch	NYS	1.2 km	MPC · JPL
495017	2010 RK_{121}	—	September 12, 2010	Mount Lemmon	Mount Lemmon Survey	EUN	1.3 km	MPC · JPL
495018	2010 RA_{136}	—	September 11, 2010	La Sagra	OAM	V	640 m	MPC · JPL
495019	2010 RE_{147}	—	September 14, 2010	Kitt Peak	Spacewatch	·	1.4 km	MPC · JPL
495020	2010 RJ_{163}	—	September 5, 2010	Mount Lemmon	Mount Lemmon Survey	NYS	1.1 km	MPC · JPL
495021	2010 SH_{15}	—	September 29, 2010	Mount Lemmon	Mount Lemmon Survey	AMO	100 m	MPC · JPL
495022	2010 TO_{12}	—	October 3, 2010	Kitt Peak	Spacewatch	·	1.6 km	MPC · JPL
495023	2010 TH_{108}	—	September 10, 2010	Kitt Peak	Spacewatch	·	1.1 km	MPC · JPL
495024	2010 UC_{11}	—	October 28, 2010	Mount Lemmon	Mount Lemmon Survey	EUN	1.3 km	MPC · JPL
495025	2010 UF_{37}	—	October 29, 2010	Mount Lemmon	Mount Lemmon Survey	·	2.1 km	MPC · JPL
495026	2010 UU_{75}	—	October 13, 2010	Mount Lemmon	Mount Lemmon Survey	·	1.6 km	MPC · JPL
495027	2010 UF_{83}	—	May 30, 2009	Mount Lemmon	Mount Lemmon Survey	·	3.0 km	MPC · JPL
495028	2010 UH_{93}	—	September 8, 1997	Caussols	ODAS	·	1.1 km	MPC · JPL
495029	2010 VA	—	March 18, 2009	Catalina	CSS	H	590 m	MPC · JPL
495030	2010 VF_{23}	—	October 12, 2010	Mount Lemmon	Mount Lemmon Survey	EUN	1.2 km	MPC · JPL
495031	2010 VK_{57}	—	October 19, 2010	Mount Lemmon	Mount Lemmon Survey	·	1.1 km	MPC · JPL
495032	2010 VX_{67}	—	October 29, 2010	Catalina	CSS	TIR	2.9 km	MPC · JPL
495033	2010 VE_{131}	—	September 11, 2010	Mount Lemmon	Mount Lemmon Survey	·	2.7 km	MPC · JPL
495034	2010 VW_{171}	—	October 14, 2010	Mount Lemmon	Mount Lemmon Survey	·	1.4 km	MPC · JPL
495035	2010 VR_{173}	—	November 2, 2010	La Sagra	OAM	JUN	1.2 km	MPC · JPL
495036	2010 VJ_{209}	—	October 11, 2010	Mount Lemmon	Mount Lemmon Survey	·	1.8 km	MPC · JPL
495037	2010 VC_{225}	—	September 7, 2008	Mount Lemmon	Mount Lemmon Survey	L4	7.4 km	MPC · JPL
495038	2010 WB_{1}	—	May 13, 2009	Kitt Peak	Spacewatch	H	580 m	MPC · JPL
495039	2010 WX_{29}	—	November 1, 2010	Kitt Peak	Spacewatch	PAD	1.5 km	MPC · JPL
495040	2010 WU_{32}	—	November 11, 2010	Mount Lemmon	Mount Lemmon Survey	HYG	2.4 km	MPC · JPL
495041	2010 WM_{54}	—	October 14, 2010	Mount Lemmon	Mount Lemmon Survey	·	1.1 km	MPC · JPL
495042	2010 XO_{28}	—	November 2, 2010	Kitt Peak	Spacewatch	·	1.3 km	MPC · JPL
495043	2010 XK_{42}	—	December 5, 2010	Mount Lemmon	Mount Lemmon Survey	·	1.3 km	MPC · JPL
495044	2010 XF_{79}	—	December 4, 2010	Mount Lemmon	Mount Lemmon Survey	·	2.2 km	MPC · JPL
495045	2011 AP_{75}	—	March 25, 2006	Kitt Peak	Spacewatch	·	2.0 km	MPC · JPL
495046	2011 BT_{38}	—	January 28, 2011	Mount Lemmon	Mount Lemmon Survey	·	3.0 km	MPC · JPL
495047	2011 BQ_{61}	—	January 26, 2011	Mount Lemmon	Mount Lemmon Survey	KOR	1.1 km	MPC · JPL
495048	2011 BW_{76}	—	January 27, 2011	Kitt Peak	Spacewatch	·	1.7 km	MPC · JPL
495049	2011 BN_{89}	—	January 26, 2006	Kitt Peak	Spacewatch	EOS	1.6 km	MPC · JPL
495050	2011 BZ_{123}	—	December 10, 2010	Mount Lemmon	Mount Lemmon Survey	·	2.3 km	MPC · JPL
495051	2011 BZ_{160}	—	February 21, 2006	Catalina	CSS	·	1.7 km	MPC · JPL
495052	2011 CW_{22}	—	September 14, 2009	Kitt Peak	Spacewatch	·	1.5 km	MPC · JPL
495053	2011 CQ_{33}	—	January 4, 2011	Mount Lemmon	Mount Lemmon Survey	·	1.7 km	MPC · JPL
495054	2011 CN_{36}	—	November 13, 2010	Kitt Peak	Spacewatch	(18466)	2.6 km	MPC · JPL
495055	2011 CB_{108}	—	February 25, 2011	Mount Lemmon	Mount Lemmon Survey	·	2.6 km	MPC · JPL
495056	2011 CW_{108}	—	February 26, 2011	Mount Lemmon	Mount Lemmon Survey	EOS	1.7 km	MPC · JPL
495057	2011 CX_{109}	—	March 6, 2011	Mount Lemmon	Mount Lemmon Survey	·	2.1 km	MPC · JPL
495058	2011 CW_{113}	—	January 28, 2011	Kitt Peak	Spacewatch	EOS	1.6 km	MPC · JPL
495059	2011 DR_{13}	—	February 5, 2006	Mount Lemmon	Mount Lemmon Survey	KOR	1.1 km	MPC · JPL
495060	2011 DX_{44}	—	March 24, 2006	Mount Lemmon	Mount Lemmon Survey	·	1.9 km	MPC · JPL
495061	2011 EY_{28}	—	February 5, 2011	Catalina	CSS	·	2.0 km	MPC · JPL
495062	2011 EB_{42}	—	November 20, 2009	Kitt Peak	Spacewatch	·	3.2 km	MPC · JPL
495063	2011 EN_{64}	—	March 23, 2006	Kitt Peak	Spacewatch	·	1.8 km	MPC · JPL
495064	2011 EU_{70}	—	March 10, 2011	Kitt Peak	Spacewatch	·	1.8 km	MPC · JPL
495065	2011 EC_{77}	—	January 26, 2010	WISE	WISE	T_{j} (2.93)	2.8 km	MPC · JPL
495066	2011 FF	—	January 13, 2005	Kitt Peak	Spacewatch	·	2.6 km	MPC · JPL
495067	2011 FX_{52}	—	February 25, 2011	Kitt Peak	Spacewatch	·	2.6 km	MPC · JPL
495068	2011 FF_{76}	—	March 1, 2011	Mount Lemmon	Mount Lemmon Survey	·	2.0 km	MPC · JPL
495069	2011 FX_{76}	—	May 1, 2006	Kitt Peak	Spacewatch	·	1.9 km	MPC · JPL
495070	2011 FB_{111}	—	September 9, 2007	Kitt Peak	Spacewatch	·	2.8 km	MPC · JPL
495071	2011 FB_{144}	—	January 11, 2011	Kitt Peak	Spacewatch	·	3.6 km	MPC · JPL
495072	2011 GB_{14}	—	March 11, 2011	Kitt Peak	Spacewatch	·	2.3 km	MPC · JPL
495073	2011 GP_{78}	—	April 2, 2010	WISE	WISE	T_{j} (2.99) · EUP	3.4 km	MPC · JPL
495074	2011 HJ_{3}	—	April 11, 2011	Mount Lemmon	Mount Lemmon Survey	·	2.8 km	MPC · JPL
495075	2011 HW_{12}	—	April 20, 2010	WISE	WISE	·	3.3 km	MPC · JPL
495076	2011 HT_{29}	—	May 1, 2000	Kitt Peak	Spacewatch	·	2.8 km	MPC · JPL
495077	2011 HP_{36}	—	April 6, 2011	Mount Lemmon	Mount Lemmon Survey	·	3.2 km	MPC · JPL
495078	2011 HL_{48}	—	April 28, 2011	Haleakala	Pan-STARRS 1	·	3.3 km	MPC · JPL
495079	2011 HE_{57}	—	February 27, 2010	WISE	WISE	CYB	1.9 km	MPC · JPL
495080	2011 JA_{4}	—	May 1, 2011	Haleakala	Pan-STARRS 1	·	3.6 km	MPC · JPL
495081	2011 JY_{4}	—	April 11, 2011	Mount Lemmon	Mount Lemmon Survey	·	1.3 km	MPC · JPL
495082	2011 JH_{24}	—	May 1, 2011	Haleakala	Pan-STARRS 1	·	4.1 km	MPC · JPL
495083	2011 JR_{25}	—	April 14, 2005	Kitt Peak	Spacewatch	EUP	3.2 km	MPC · JPL
495084	2011 JE_{28}	—	January 30, 2011	Haleakala	Pan-STARRS 1	·	3.3 km	MPC · JPL
495085	2011 KL_{20}	—	April 28, 2011	Haleakala	Pan-STARRS 1	·	2.7 km	MPC · JPL
495086	2011 LA_{17}	—	April 24, 2011	Haleakala	Pan-STARRS 1	T_{j} (2.83)	3.9 km	MPC · JPL
495087	2011 QR_{33}	—	March 15, 2010	Kitt Peak	Spacewatch	·	720 m	MPC · JPL
495088	2011 SU_{5}	—	September 18, 2011	Haleakala	Pan-STARRS 1	PHO	1.0 km	MPC · JPL
495089	2011 SA_{29}	—	July 3, 2011	Mount Lemmon	Mount Lemmon Survey	·	530 m	MPC · JPL
495090	2011 SY_{29}	—	September 20, 2011	Mount Lemmon	Mount Lemmon Survey	·	560 m	MPC · JPL
495091	2011 SR_{73}	—	October 25, 2008	Kitt Peak	Spacewatch	·	570 m	MPC · JPL
495092	2011 SB_{74}	—	September 19, 2011	Haleakala	Pan-STARRS 1	·	790 m	MPC · JPL
495093	2011 SH_{80}	—	September 4, 2011	Haleakala	Pan-STARRS 1	·	640 m	MPC · JPL
495094	2011 SN_{92}	—	September 22, 2011	Kitt Peak	Spacewatch	·	690 m	MPC · JPL
495095	2011 SR_{93}	—	September 23, 2011	Kitt Peak	Spacewatch	·	720 m	MPC · JPL
495096	2011 SY_{183}	—	September 26, 2011	Kitt Peak	Spacewatch	AEO	830 m	MPC · JPL
495097	2011 SJ_{195}	—	September 2, 2011	Haleakala	Pan-STARRS 1	·	760 m	MPC · JPL
495098	2011 SO_{221}	—	November 21, 2008	Kitt Peak	Spacewatch	·	480 m	MPC · JPL
495099	2011 SO_{257}	—	September 23, 2011	Kitt Peak	Spacewatch	EUN	970 m	MPC · JPL
495100	2011 UQ_{37}	—	October 20, 2011	Kitt Peak	Spacewatch	V	530 m	MPC · JPL

== 495101–495200 ==
back to top

Designation			Discovery			Properties		Ref
Permanent	Provisional	Named after	Date	Site	Discoverer(s)	Category	Diam.	Ref
495101	2011 UF_{58}	—	September 22, 2011	Catalina	CSS	·	1.5 km	MPC · JPL
495102	2011 UU_{106}	—	October 15, 2006	San Marcello	San Marcello	APO · fast?	610 m	MPC · JPL
495103	2011 UR_{134}	—	September 28, 2011	Kitt Peak	Spacewatch	ADE	1.3 km	MPC · JPL
495104	2011 UG_{146}	—	October 24, 2011	Kitt Peak	Spacewatch	V	550 m	MPC · JPL
495105	2011 UM_{151}	—	October 25, 2011	Haleakala	Pan-STARRS 1	·	1.2 km	MPC · JPL
495106	2011 US_{166}	—	October 26, 2011	Haleakala	Pan-STARRS 1	V	690 m	MPC · JPL
495107	2011 UF_{186}	—	October 25, 2011	Haleakala	Pan-STARRS 1	·	600 m	MPC · JPL
495108	2011 UA_{188}	—	September 4, 2011	Haleakala	Pan-STARRS 1	·	630 m	MPC · JPL
495109	2011 UF_{190}	—	October 5, 2011	La Sagra	OAM	·	1.4 km	MPC · JPL
495110	2011 UH_{194}	—	October 21, 2011	Catalina	CSS	·	2.1 km	MPC · JPL
495111	2011 UU_{200}	—	October 25, 2011	Haleakala	Pan-STARRS 1	·	1.2 km	MPC · JPL
495112	2011 UH_{246}	—	September 13, 2007	Mount Lemmon	Mount Lemmon Survey	NYS	880 m	MPC · JPL
495113	2011 UX_{247}	—	October 26, 2011	Haleakala	Pan-STARRS 1	·	570 m	MPC · JPL
495114	2011 UY_{248}	—	October 26, 2011	Haleakala	Pan-STARRS 1	·	840 m	MPC · JPL
495115	2011 UV_{249}	—	October 9, 2004	Kitt Peak	Spacewatch	·	570 m	MPC · JPL
495116	2011 UV_{282}	—	October 20, 2011	Mount Lemmon	Mount Lemmon Survey	·	650 m	MPC · JPL
495117	2011 UV_{293}	—	November 13, 2007	Kitt Peak	Spacewatch	·	940 m	MPC · JPL
495118	2011 UW_{342}	—	March 14, 2010	Mount Lemmon	Mount Lemmon Survey	·	580 m	MPC · JPL
495119	2011 UF_{354}	—	September 20, 2011	Kitt Peak	Spacewatch	V	560 m	MPC · JPL
495120	2011 UR_{387}	—	October 25, 2011	Haleakala	Pan-STARRS 1	·	1.4 km	MPC · JPL
495121	2011 UY_{403}	—	October 24, 2011	Haleakala	Pan-STARRS 1	·	850 m	MPC · JPL
495122	2011 VC_{9}	—	February 10, 2008	Catalina	CSS	·	1.5 km	MPC · JPL
495123	2011 WM_{21}	—	October 26, 2011	Haleakala	Pan-STARRS 1	·	610 m	MPC · JPL
495124	2011 WZ_{26}	—	November 18, 2011	Mount Lemmon	Mount Lemmon Survey	PHO	1.6 km	MPC · JPL
495125	2011 WA_{36}	—	November 15, 2011	Mount Lemmon	Mount Lemmon Survey	·	770 m	MPC · JPL
495126	2011 WU_{60}	—	October 26, 2011	Haleakala	Pan-STARRS 1	EOS	1.5 km	MPC · JPL
495127	2011 WB_{80}	—	October 21, 2011	Mount Lemmon	Mount Lemmon Survey	·	770 m	MPC · JPL
495128	2011 WL_{122}	—	September 17, 2004	Kitt Peak	Spacewatch	·	560 m	MPC · JPL
495129	2011 WK_{150}	—	October 23, 2011	Haleakala	Pan-STARRS 1	·	1.3 km	MPC · JPL
495130	2011 YU_{8}	—	October 26, 2011	Haleakala	Pan-STARRS 1	·	950 m	MPC · JPL
495131	2011 YP_{26}	—	March 13, 2008	Catalina	CSS	·	1.7 km	MPC · JPL
495132	2011 YE_{44}	—	December 27, 2011	Kitt Peak	Spacewatch	·	1.4 km	MPC · JPL
495133	2011 YL_{68}	—	December 31, 2011	Kitt Peak	Spacewatch	·	1.2 km	MPC · JPL
495134	2012 BS_{4}	—	January 14, 2012	Kitt Peak	Spacewatch	·	1.4 km	MPC · JPL
495135	2012 BX_{10}	—	January 18, 2012	Kitt Peak	Spacewatch	·	1.4 km	MPC · JPL
495136	2012 BX_{17}	—	January 19, 2012	Haleakala	Pan-STARRS 1	·	1.3 km	MPC · JPL
495137	2012 BY_{22}	—	December 26, 2011	Kitt Peak	Spacewatch	·	1.8 km	MPC · JPL
495138	2012 BC_{25}	—	December 31, 2002	Socorro	LINEAR	·	2.2 km	MPC · JPL
495139	2012 BT_{25}	—	December 24, 2011	Catalina	CSS	·	2.2 km	MPC · JPL
495140	2012 BH_{66}	—	January 20, 2012	Mount Lemmon	Mount Lemmon Survey	MAR	970 m	MPC · JPL
495141	2012 BF_{118}	—	February 18, 2008	Mount Lemmon	Mount Lemmon Survey	·	2.2 km	MPC · JPL
495142	2012 CW_{22}	—	January 20, 2012	Kitt Peak	Spacewatch	·	1.6 km	MPC · JPL
495143	2012 CX_{53}	—	February 3, 2012	Haleakala	Pan-STARRS 1	·	1.1 km	MPC · JPL
495144	2012 DJ_{17}	—	January 18, 2012	Mount Lemmon	Mount Lemmon Survey	JUN	1.1 km	MPC · JPL
495145	2012 DC_{34}	—	January 19, 2012	Haleakala	Pan-STARRS 1	EUN	1.0 km	MPC · JPL
495146	2012 DK_{39}	—	January 19, 2012	Haleakala	Pan-STARRS 1	·	2.3 km	MPC · JPL
495147	2012 DC_{48}	—	February 13, 2012	Haleakala	Pan-STARRS 1	·	1.1 km	MPC · JPL
495148	2012 DN_{75}	—	January 19, 2012	Haleakala	Pan-STARRS 1	HNS	1.0 km	MPC · JPL
495149	2012 DC_{76}	—	December 28, 2011	Catalina	CSS	·	1.6 km	MPC · JPL
495150	2012 DP_{76}	—	January 21, 2012	Haleakala	Pan-STARRS 1	MAR	1.1 km	MPC · JPL
495151	2012 DF_{88}	—	August 15, 2009	Catalina	CSS	MAR	1.1 km	MPC · JPL
495152	2012 DG_{93}	—	January 19, 2012	Haleakala	Pan-STARRS 1	·	1.3 km	MPC · JPL
495153	2012 FY	—	September 20, 2001	Socorro	LINEAR	·	390 m	MPC · JPL
495154	2012 FF_{29}	—	October 29, 2010	Kitt Peak	Spacewatch	DOR	2.1 km	MPC · JPL
495155	2012 FD_{40}	—	September 19, 2008	Kitt Peak	Spacewatch	·	1.6 km	MPC · JPL
495156	2012 FG_{42}	—	February 28, 2012	Haleakala	Pan-STARRS 1	MRX	1.0 km	MPC · JPL
495157	2012 FO_{47}	—	October 1, 2005	Mount Lemmon	Mount Lemmon Survey	AGN	940 m	MPC · JPL
495158	2012 FZ_{60}	—	September 19, 2009	Mount Lemmon	Mount Lemmon Survey	·	1.8 km	MPC · JPL
495159	2012 FP_{63}	—	October 27, 2005	Kitt Peak	Spacewatch	·	1.9 km	MPC · JPL
495160	2012 FV_{73}	—	February 27, 2012	Haleakala	Pan-STARRS 1	HNS	1.1 km	MPC · JPL
495161	2012 FY_{78}	—	March 16, 2012	Haleakala	Pan-STARRS 1	·	1.8 km	MPC · JPL
495162	2012 GF_{2}	—	March 13, 2012	Kitt Peak	Spacewatch	H	430 m	MPC · JPL
495163	2012 GY_{2}	—	September 20, 2009	Kitt Peak	Spacewatch	·	2.1 km	MPC · JPL
495164	2012 GL_{4}	—	October 28, 2005	Kitt Peak	Spacewatch	·	2.1 km	MPC · JPL
495165	2012 GB_{27}	—	April 15, 2012	Haleakala	Pan-STARRS 1	·	2.8 km	MPC · JPL
495166	2012 HH_{13}	—	April 26, 2007	Mount Lemmon	Mount Lemmon Survey	·	2.3 km	MPC · JPL
495167	2012 HO_{27}	—	March 16, 2012	Mount Lemmon	Mount Lemmon Survey	·	1.3 km	MPC · JPL
495168	2012 HC_{34}	—	April 28, 2012	Mount Lemmon	Mount Lemmon Survey	AMO	300 m	MPC · JPL
495169	2012 HO_{67}	—	April 25, 2007	Kitt Peak	Spacewatch	·	1.7 km	MPC · JPL
495170	2012 HP_{73}	—	January 28, 2011	Mount Lemmon	Mount Lemmon Survey	·	1.6 km	MPC · JPL
495171	2012 JS_{4}	—	December 28, 2003	Socorro	LINEAR	H	530 m	MPC · JPL
495172	2012 JK_{26}	—	May 14, 2012	Kitt Peak	Spacewatch	·	2.3 km	MPC · JPL
495173	2012 KF_{44}	—	May 21, 2012	Haleakala	Pan-STARRS 1	·	2.8 km	MPC · JPL
495174	2012 LV_{21}	—	November 7, 2010	Haleakala	Pan-STARRS 1	H	420 m	MPC · JPL
495175	2012 MH	—	June 14, 2012	Mount Lemmon	Mount Lemmon Survey	TIR	2.9 km	MPC · JPL
495176	2012 MA_{2}	—	June 17, 2012	Mount Lemmon	Mount Lemmon Survey	H	700 m	MPC · JPL
495177	2012 MP_{2}	—	February 5, 2009	Mount Lemmon	Mount Lemmon Survey	H	510 m	MPC · JPL
495178	2012 MZ_{5}	—	September 20, 2007	Catalina	CSS	·	3.5 km	MPC · JPL
495179	2012 MN_{11}	—	June 16, 2012	Haleakala	Pan-STARRS 1	·	2.8 km	MPC · JPL
495180	2012 OS_{2}	—	May 30, 2012	Mount Lemmon	Mount Lemmon Survey	H	490 m	MPC · JPL
495181 Rogerwaters	2012 PV_{19}	Rogerwaters	August 14, 2012	Tincana	M. Żołnowski, M. Kusiak	·	2.0 km	MPC · JPL
495182	2012 SX_{10}	—	August 22, 2012	La Sagra	OAM	·	2.6 km	MPC · JPL
495183	2012 TY_{20}	—	April 4, 2011	Kitt Peak	Spacewatch	T_{j} (2.98)	2.3 km	MPC · JPL
495184	2012 TF_{73}	—	October 9, 2007	Kitt Peak	Spacewatch	·	2.4 km	MPC · JPL
495185	2012 UO_{135}	—	April 5, 2011	Kitt Peak	Spacewatch	·	1.1 km	MPC · JPL
495186	2012 VR_{49}	—	October 18, 2012	Haleakala	Pan-STARRS 1	·	1.6 km	MPC · JPL
495187	2012 VO_{76}	—	November 13, 2012	Socorro	LINEAR	APO · PHA	220 m	MPC · JPL
495188	2012 VM_{106}	—	April 13, 2011	Haleakala	Pan-STARRS 1	H	490 m	MPC · JPL
495189	2012 VR_{113}	—	November 15, 2012	Cerro Tololo	Dark Energy Survey	twotino	180 km	MPC · JPL
495190	2012 VS_{113}	—	November 12, 2012	Cerro Tololo	Dark Energy Survey	SDO	140 km	MPC · JPL
495191	2012 XX_{6}	—	December 5, 2012	Mount Lemmon	Mount Lemmon Survey	H	680 m	MPC · JPL
495192	2012 XV_{109}	—	January 7, 2010	Kitt Peak	Spacewatch	·	590 m	MPC · JPL
495193	2013 AC_{77}	—	November 27, 2012	Mount Lemmon	Mount Lemmon Survey	·	1.3 km	MPC · JPL
495194	2013 BH	—	September 27, 2012	Haleakala	Pan-STARRS 1	L4 · ERY	7.4 km	MPC · JPL
495195	2013 BX_{22}	—	October 31, 2008	Catalina	CSS	·	1.9 km	MPC · JPL
495196	2013 CX_{15}	—	February 7, 2002	Kitt Peak	Spacewatch	NYS	710 m	MPC · JPL
495197	2013 CC_{17}	—	November 3, 2008	Kitt Peak	Spacewatch	·	720 m	MPC · JPL
495198	2013 CL_{18}	—	February 1, 2013	Kitt Peak	Spacewatch	NYS	1.2 km	MPC · JPL
495199	2013 CF_{21}	—	March 16, 2002	Socorro	LINEAR	NYS	1.2 km	MPC · JPL
495200	2013 CN_{27}	—	January 3, 2013	Mount Lemmon	Mount Lemmon Survey	·	730 m	MPC · JPL

== 495201–495300 ==
back to top

Designation			Discovery			Properties		Ref
Permanent	Provisional	Named after	Date	Site	Discoverer(s)	Category	Diam.	Ref
495201	2013 CP_{34}	—	February 5, 2013	Kitt Peak	Spacewatch	·	1.1 km	MPC · JPL
495202	2013 CG_{48}	—	September 23, 2011	Haleakala	Pan-STARRS 1	·	960 m	MPC · JPL
495203	2013 CW_{53}	—	September 4, 2011	Haleakala	Pan-STARRS 1	·	770 m	MPC · JPL
495204	2013 CA_{67}	—	February 8, 2013	Haleakala	Pan-STARRS 1	·	830 m	MPC · JPL
495205	2013 CU_{80}	—	October 18, 2011	Mount Lemmon	Mount Lemmon Survey	·	790 m	MPC · JPL
495206	2013 CM_{88}	—	February 12, 2013	Haleakala	Pan-STARRS 1	H	560 m	MPC · JPL
495207	2013 CR_{116}	—	February 5, 2013	Kitt Peak	Spacewatch	·	950 m	MPC · JPL
495208	2013 CC_{120}	—	January 3, 2013	Haleakala	Pan-STARRS 1	·	660 m	MPC · JPL
495209	2013 CB_{143}	—	January 9, 2013	Mount Lemmon	Mount Lemmon Survey	·	990 m	MPC · JPL
495210	2013 CM_{148}	—	April 2, 2006	Kitt Peak	Spacewatch	·	970 m	MPC · JPL
495211	2013 CP_{180}	—	March 2, 2006	Mount Lemmon	Mount Lemmon Survey	·	710 m	MPC · JPL
495212	2013 CX_{185}	—	May 19, 2010	XuYi	PMO NEO Survey Program	·	910 m	MPC · JPL
495213	2013 CA_{192}	—	September 24, 2011	Mount Lemmon	Mount Lemmon Survey	PHO	1.1 km	MPC · JPL
495214	2013 CB_{209}	—	February 11, 2013	Catalina	CSS	·	1.2 km	MPC · JPL
495215	2013 EN_{5}	—	April 2, 2006	Kitt Peak	Spacewatch	NYS	780 m	MPC · JPL
495216	2013 ET_{12}	—	September 9, 2007	Mount Lemmon	Mount Lemmon Survey	·	980 m	MPC · JPL
495217	2013 EO_{14}	—	October 20, 2011	Mount Lemmon	Mount Lemmon Survey	·	1.0 km	MPC · JPL
495218	2013 EJ_{17}	—	March 2, 2006	Kitt Peak	Spacewatch	V	520 m	MPC · JPL
495219	2013 FO_{12}	—	March 11, 2013	Mount Lemmon	Mount Lemmon Survey	·	1.2 km	MPC · JPL
495220	2013 FL_{13}	—	September 23, 2011	Haleakala	Pan-STARRS 1	·	960 m	MPC · JPL
495221	2013 FV_{22}	—	March 24, 2006	Kitt Peak	Spacewatch	·	870 m	MPC · JPL
495222	2013 GU_{38}	—	April 7, 2013	Haleakala	Pan-STARRS 1	AMO	250 m	MPC · JPL
495223	2013 GN_{47}	—	March 11, 2013	Mount Lemmon	Mount Lemmon Survey	MAS	710 m	MPC · JPL
495224	2013 GF_{52}	—	April 10, 2013	Mount Lemmon	Mount Lemmon Survey	EUN	960 m	MPC · JPL
495225	2013 GD_{59}	—	March 19, 2013	Haleakala	Pan-STARRS 1	·	1.0 km	MPC · JPL
495226	2013 GP_{86}	—	November 7, 2007	Kitt Peak	Spacewatch	·	1.4 km	MPC · JPL
495227	2013 GL_{89}	—	May 14, 2005	Mount Lemmon	Mount Lemmon Survey	·	1.1 km	MPC · JPL
495228	2013 GA_{101}	—	March 24, 2009	Mount Lemmon	Mount Lemmon Survey	·	1.4 km	MPC · JPL
495229	2013 GJ_{130}	—	August 2, 2010	La Sagra	OAM	V	700 m	MPC · JPL
495230	2013 GU_{135}	—	April 13, 2013	Haleakala	Pan-STARRS 1	·	980 m	MPC · JPL
495231	2013 HR_{4}	—	March 24, 2013	Mount Lemmon	Mount Lemmon Survey	V	630 m	MPC · JPL
495232	2013 HS_{12}	—	March 14, 2013	Kitt Peak	Spacewatch	·	1.1 km	MPC · JPL
495233	2013 HS_{56}	—	October 24, 2011	Haleakala	Pan-STARRS 1	·	1 km	MPC · JPL
495234	2013 HP_{75}	—	September 11, 2010	Catalina	CSS	NYS	990 m	MPC · JPL
495235	2013 HX_{81}	—	January 21, 2013	Haleakala	Pan-STARRS 1	·	2.8 km	MPC · JPL
495236	2013 HJ_{114}	—	March 22, 2009	Mount Lemmon	Mount Lemmon Survey	NYS	680 m	MPC · JPL
495237	2013 JY_{12}	—	August 28, 2005	Socorro	LINEAR	·	1.4 km	MPC · JPL
495238	2013 JB_{26}	—	April 10, 2013	Mount Lemmon	Mount Lemmon Survey	·	1.4 km	MPC · JPL
495239	2013 JS_{31}	—	October 9, 2010	Mount Lemmon	Mount Lemmon Survey	MAS	600 m	MPC · JPL
495240	2013 JU_{35}	—	May 15, 2013	Haleakala	Pan-STARRS 1	·	1.4 km	MPC · JPL
495241	2013 JT_{37}	—	May 7, 2013	Catalina	CSS	·	1.6 km	MPC · JPL
495242	2013 JE_{46}	—	January 19, 2012	Haleakala	Pan-STARRS 1	·	1.0 km	MPC · JPL
495243	2013 JO_{55}	—	April 21, 2013	Mount Lemmon	Mount Lemmon Survey	·	1.1 km	MPC · JPL
495244	2013 KP_{14}	—	April 15, 2013	Haleakala	Pan-STARRS 1	·	1.1 km	MPC · JPL
495245	2013 LM_{6}	—	May 30, 2013	Kitt Peak	Spacewatch	·	1.8 km	MPC · JPL
495246	2013 LU_{14}	—	May 16, 2013	Kitt Peak	Spacewatch	HNS	1.4 km	MPC · JPL
495247	2013 LR_{24}	—	September 30, 2005	Mount Lemmon	Mount Lemmon Survey	·	1.8 km	MPC · JPL
495248	2013 LA_{25}	—	June 6, 2013	Mount Lemmon	Mount Lemmon Survey	BAR	1.4 km	MPC · JPL
495249	2013 LE_{26}	—	December 28, 2011	Kitt Peak	Spacewatch	·	1.0 km	MPC · JPL
495250	2013 LY_{27}	—	April 26, 2009	Mount Lemmon	Mount Lemmon Survey	·	1.3 km	MPC · JPL
495251	2013 NH	—	December 8, 2010	Mount Lemmon	Mount Lemmon Survey	·	1.6 km	MPC · JPL
495252	2013 OS	—	July 12, 2013	Haleakala	Pan-STARRS 1	·	3.3 km	MPC · JPL
495253 Hanszimmer	2013 OC_{8}	Hanszimmer	July 30, 2013	Tincana	Kusiak, M., Zolnowski, M.	·	1.4 km	MPC · JPL
495254	2013 PG_{2}	—	October 27, 2005	Catalina	CSS	·	1.4 km	MPC · JPL
495255	2013 PE_{16}	—	June 5, 2013	Mount Lemmon	Mount Lemmon Survey	·	1.7 km	MPC · JPL
495256	2013 PW_{19}	—	February 27, 2012	Haleakala	Pan-STARRS 1	·	1.6 km	MPC · JPL
495257	2013 PU_{25}	—	August 8, 2013	Kitt Peak	Spacewatch	·	2.2 km	MPC · JPL
495258	2013 PC_{27}	—	April 2, 2011	Mount Lemmon	Mount Lemmon Survey	·	2.4 km	MPC · JPL
495259	2013 PT_{32}	—	May 16, 2012	Haleakala	Pan-STARRS 1	·	2.8 km	MPC · JPL
495260	2013 PO_{38}	—	September 20, 2003	Campo Imperatore	CINEOS	·	2.9 km	MPC · JPL
495261	2013 PW_{61}	—	September 11, 2004	Kitt Peak	Spacewatch	·	1.6 km	MPC · JPL
495262	2013 PT_{62}	—	April 15, 2012	Haleakala	Pan-STARRS 1	·	1.7 km	MPC · JPL
495263	2013 PB_{72}	—	April 3, 2011	Haleakala	Pan-STARRS 1	·	3.2 km	MPC · JPL
495264	2013 QE	—	July 15, 2013	Haleakala	Pan-STARRS 1	·	2.7 km	MPC · JPL
495265	2013 QJ_{2}	—	March 15, 2012	Kitt Peak	Spacewatch	·	1.9 km	MPC · JPL
495266	2013 QD_{4}	—	August 21, 2004	Kitt Peak	Spacewatch	·	1.2 km	MPC · JPL
495267	2013 QM_{14}	—	August 27, 2013	Haleakala	Pan-STARRS 1	·	3.0 km	MPC · JPL
495268	2013 QC_{27}	—	February 28, 2012	Haleakala	Pan-STARRS 1	EUN	1.1 km	MPC · JPL
495269	2013 QT_{31}	—	March 2, 2011	Mount Lemmon	Mount Lemmon Survey	·	2.2 km	MPC · JPL
495270	2013 QN_{34}	—	August 30, 2013	Haleakala	Pan-STARRS 1	·	2.8 km	MPC · JPL
495271	2013 QZ_{38}	—	July 30, 2013	Kitt Peak	Spacewatch	·	1.4 km	MPC · JPL
495272	2013 QE_{79}	—	July 30, 2013	Kitt Peak	Spacewatch	·	1.7 km	MPC · JPL
495273	2013 QO_{90}	—	March 9, 2007	Mount Lemmon	Mount Lemmon Survey	·	1.6 km	MPC · JPL
495274	2013 QV_{93}	—	September 21, 2009	Mount Lemmon	Mount Lemmon Survey	·	1.3 km	MPC · JPL
495275	2013 RT_{7}	—	August 15, 2013	Haleakala	Pan-STARRS 1	·	2.6 km	MPC · JPL
495276	2013 RQ_{17}	—	July 29, 2008	Mount Lemmon	Mount Lemmon Survey	·	1.3 km	MPC · JPL
495277	2013 RR_{27}	—	September 14, 2007	Catalina	CSS	·	4.1 km	MPC · JPL
495278	2013 RD_{32}	—	August 25, 2004	Kitt Peak	Spacewatch	AMO	630 m	MPC · JPL
495279	2013 RV_{38}	—	May 2, 2006	Mount Lemmon	Mount Lemmon Survey	·	2.6 km	MPC · JPL
495280	2013 RD_{45}	—	November 26, 2008	La Sagra	OAM	URS	4.2 km	MPC · JPL
495281	2013 RU_{50}	—	February 18, 2010	WISE	WISE	·	2.5 km	MPC · JPL
495282	2013 RE_{51}	—	September 13, 2007	Mount Lemmon	Mount Lemmon Survey	THM	2.3 km	MPC · JPL
495283	2013 RS_{69}	—	February 25, 2011	Mount Lemmon	Mount Lemmon Survey	·	2.2 km	MPC · JPL
495284	2013 RG_{79}	—	April 15, 2012	Haleakala	Pan-STARRS 1	·	1.7 km	MPC · JPL
495285	2013 RM_{84}	—	September 5, 2013	Kitt Peak	Spacewatch	·	2.8 km	MPC · JPL
495286	2013 RP_{92}	—	September 5, 2013	Kitt Peak	Spacewatch	TIR	3.0 km	MPC · JPL
495287 Harari	2013 RW_{94}	Harari	September 11, 2013	Tincana	Zolnowski, M., Kusiak, M.	·	4.0 km	MPC · JPL
495288	2013 SN_{27}	—	August 27, 2013	Haleakala	Pan-STARRS 1	·	2.9 km	MPC · JPL
495289	2013 TS_{21}	—	March 2, 2011	Kitt Peak	Spacewatch	·	2.6 km	MPC · JPL
495290	2013 TC_{35}	—	October 8, 1996	Kitt Peak	Spacewatch	·	2.8 km	MPC · JPL
495291	2013 TK_{44}	—	September 13, 2013	Mount Lemmon	Mount Lemmon Survey	·	1.9 km	MPC · JPL
495292	2013 TN_{97}	—	November 20, 2008	Mount Lemmon	Mount Lemmon Survey	·	2.3 km	MPC · JPL
495293	2013 TO_{97}	—	April 5, 2011	Mount Lemmon	Mount Lemmon Survey	·	2.3 km	MPC · JPL
495294	2013 TY_{118}	—	October 16, 2001	Kitt Peak	Spacewatch	CYB	3.1 km	MPC · JPL
495295	2013 TX_{138}	—	October 3, 2013	Haleakala	Pan-STARRS 1	(1298)	2.9 km	MPC · JPL
495296	2013 TV_{148}	—	August 8, 2013	Kitt Peak	Spacewatch	VER	2.5 km	MPC · JPL
495297	2013 TJ_{159}	—	October 13, 2013	Cerro Tololo	DECam	res · 3:7	164 km	MPC · JPL
495298	2013 UU_{7}	—	April 30, 2011	Haleakala	Pan-STARRS 1	·	4.2 km	MPC · JPL
495299	2013 VD_{6}	—	November 1, 2013	Catalina	CSS	·	3.5 km	MPC · JPL
495300	2013 VO_{22}	—	May 13, 2010	WISE	WISE	ARM	5.3 km	MPC · JPL

== 495301–495400 ==
back to top

Designation			Discovery			Properties		Ref
Permanent	Provisional	Named after	Date	Site	Discoverer(s)	Category	Diam.	Ref
495301	2013 WO_{7}	—	May 31, 2000	Kitt Peak	Spacewatch	·	3.7 km	MPC · JPL
495302	2013 WW_{39}	—	January 6, 2003	Kitt Peak	Spacewatch	EUP	5.9 km	MPC · JPL
495303	2013 WH_{59}	—	November 1, 2013	Haleakala	Pan-STARRS 1	·	3.2 km	MPC · JPL
495304	2013 YC_{19}	—	April 21, 2012	Haleakala	Pan-STARRS 1	H	510 m	MPC · JPL
495305	2013 YE_{97}	—	March 3, 2009	Catalina	CSS	H	480 m	MPC · JPL
495306	2014 AW_{15}	—	May 3, 2009	Mount Lemmon	Mount Lemmon Survey	H	530 m	MPC · JPL
495307	2014 AQ_{32}	—	February 17, 2007	Kitt Peak	Spacewatch	H	330 m	MPC · JPL
495308	2014 AE_{33}	—	January 7, 2014	Catalina	CSS	H	490 m	MPC · JPL
495309	2014 DU_{112}	—	July 29, 2012	Haleakala	Pan-STARRS 1	H	500 m	MPC · JPL
495310	2014 EH	—	May 21, 2012	Mount Lemmon	Mount Lemmon Survey	H	540 m	MPC · JPL
495311	2014 ED_{4}	—	March 7, 2014	Catalina	CSS	H	600 m	MPC · JPL
495312	2014 EV_{24}	—	September 13, 2007	Catalina	CSS	H	640 m	MPC · JPL
495313	2014 EW_{49}	—	February 23, 2006	Anderson Mesa	LONEOS	H	500 m	MPC · JPL
495314	2014 FP_{10}	—	February 24, 2014	Haleakala	Pan-STARRS 1	H	520 m	MPC · JPL
495315	2014 GH_{9}	—	May 11, 2007	Mount Lemmon	Mount Lemmon Survey	MAS	610 m	MPC · JPL
495316	2014 GD_{45}	—	September 21, 2011	Haleakala	Pan-STARRS 1	AMO	240 m	MPC · JPL
495317	2014 HL_{46}	—	December 17, 2007	Mount Lemmon	Mount Lemmon Survey	H	590 m	MPC · JPL
495318	2014 HF_{128}	—	October 18, 2011	Kitt Peak	Spacewatch	HOF	2.4 km	MPC · JPL
495319	2014 HB_{154}	—	October 1, 2011	Kitt Peak	Spacewatch	·	1.7 km	MPC · JPL
495320	2014 HP_{181}	—	April 5, 2014	Haleakala	Pan-STARRS 1	EOS	2.0 km	MPC · JPL
495321	2014 JJ_{53}	—	October 31, 2010	Mount Lemmon	Mount Lemmon Survey	·	2.5 km	MPC · JPL
495322	2014 JF_{69}	—	January 30, 2004	Kitt Peak	Spacewatch	·	1.5 km	MPC · JPL
495323	2014 JG_{78}	—	May 8, 2014	Haleakala	Pan-STARRS 1	APO	410 m	MPC · JPL
495324	2014 KR	—	November 7, 2008	Mount Lemmon	Mount Lemmon Survey	·	990 m	MPC · JPL
495325	2014 KS_{2}	—	November 6, 2012	Mount Lemmon	Mount Lemmon Survey	·	760 m	MPC · JPL
495326	2014 KE_{7}	—	September 27, 2011	Mount Lemmon	Mount Lemmon Survey	·	1.9 km	MPC · JPL
495327	2014 KU_{24}	—	April 1, 2008	Mount Lemmon	Mount Lemmon Survey	·	2.3 km	MPC · JPL
495328	2014 KP_{31}	—	June 9, 2005	Kitt Peak	Spacewatch	·	2.0 km	MPC · JPL
495329	2014 KJ_{55}	—	February 8, 2007	Kitt Peak	Spacewatch	·	600 m	MPC · JPL
495330	2014 KL_{88}	—	February 14, 2013	Haleakala	Pan-STARRS 1	·	1.6 km	MPC · JPL
495331	2014 KF_{91}	—	October 21, 2011	Mount Lemmon	Mount Lemmon Survey	AMO	510 m	MPC · JPL
495332	2014 LH_{8}	—	November 20, 2008	Mount Lemmon	Mount Lemmon Survey	·	1.6 km	MPC · JPL
495333	2014 LU_{12}	—	December 22, 2008	Kitt Peak	Spacewatch	·	1.5 km	MPC · JPL
495334	2014 LF_{27}	—	December 20, 2006	Mount Lemmon	Mount Lemmon Survey	PHO	850 m	MPC · JPL
495335	2014 MA_{25}	—	November 10, 2004	Kitt Peak	Spacewatch	·	760 m	MPC · JPL
495336	2014 ML_{31}	—	October 25, 2011	Haleakala	Pan-STARRS 1	·	1.4 km	MPC · JPL
495337	2014 MT_{35}	—	December 23, 2006	Mount Lemmon	Mount Lemmon Survey	·	700 m	MPC · JPL
495338	2014 ML_{37}	—	November 2, 2011	Mount Lemmon	Mount Lemmon Survey	V	630 m	MPC · JPL
495339	2014 MK_{40}	—	October 18, 2011	Mount Lemmon	Mount Lemmon Survey	·	650 m	MPC · JPL
495340	2014 NX_{11}	—	November 19, 2008	Mount Lemmon	Mount Lemmon Survey	·	580 m	MPC · JPL
495341	2014 NJ_{24}	—	February 10, 2007	Mount Lemmon	Mount Lemmon Survey	·	2.9 km	MPC · JPL
495342	2014 NN_{36}	—	December 31, 2007	Catalina	CSS	EUN	1.6 km	MPC · JPL
495343	2014 NE_{37}	—	November 16, 2011	Mount Lemmon	Mount Lemmon Survey	·	700 m	MPC · JPL
495344	2014 NW_{57}	—	April 20, 2013	Mount Lemmon	Mount Lemmon Survey	URS	3.2 km	MPC · JPL
495345	2014 NS_{59}	—	September 17, 2004	Kitt Peak	Spacewatch	·	560 m	MPC · JPL
495346	2014 OU_{2}	—	January 7, 2006	Mount Lemmon	Mount Lemmon Survey	V	510 m	MPC · JPL
495347	2014 OJ_{14}	—	September 23, 2011	Haleakala	Pan-STARRS 1	·	700 m	MPC · JPL
495348	2014 OB_{39}	—	May 26, 2007	Mount Lemmon	Mount Lemmon Survey	·	510 m	MPC · JPL
495349	2014 OO_{41}	—	September 18, 2006	Catalina	CSS	·	1.0 km	MPC · JPL
495350	2014 OB_{42}	—	October 1, 2010	Mount Lemmon	Mount Lemmon Survey	·	1.3 km	MPC · JPL
495351	2014 OB_{45}	—	October 18, 2011	Kitt Peak	Spacewatch	·	630 m	MPC · JPL
495352	2014 OZ_{57}	—	March 12, 2013	Kitt Peak	Spacewatch	·	1.3 km	MPC · JPL
495353	2014 ON_{59}	—	June 27, 2014	Haleakala	Pan-STARRS 1	·	850 m	MPC · JPL
495354	2014 OD_{66}	—	February 9, 2010	Kitt Peak	Spacewatch	·	550 m	MPC · JPL
495355	2014 OB_{72}	—	October 26, 2011	Haleakala	Pan-STARRS 1	·	530 m	MPC · JPL
495356	2014 OL_{88}	—	February 7, 2008	Mount Lemmon	Mount Lemmon Survey	NEM	1.8 km	MPC · JPL
495357	2014 OV_{88}	—	January 4, 2012	Mount Lemmon	Mount Lemmon Survey	·	2.6 km	MPC · JPL
495358	2014 OP_{89}	—	May 15, 2009	Kitt Peak	Spacewatch	·	1.4 km	MPC · JPL
495359	2014 OB_{91}	—	February 17, 2007	Mount Lemmon	Mount Lemmon Survey	·	1.8 km	MPC · JPL
495360	2014 OA_{96}	—	February 14, 2013	Haleakala	Pan-STARRS 1	·	770 m	MPC · JPL
495361	2014 OT_{96}	—	July 7, 2014	Haleakala	Pan-STARRS 1	·	670 m	MPC · JPL
495362	2014 OQ_{116}	—	February 3, 2006	Mauna Kea	P. A. Wiegert, R. Rasmussen	·	510 m	MPC · JPL
495363	2014 OW_{150}	—	September 27, 2009	Kitt Peak	Spacewatch	·	2.4 km	MPC · JPL
495364	2014 OJ_{165}	—	October 23, 2011	Haleakala	Pan-STARRS 1	·	1.0 km	MPC · JPL
495365	2014 OQ_{182}	—	December 30, 2007	Mount Lemmon	Mount Lemmon Survey	V	690 m	MPC · JPL
495366	2014 OF_{185}	—	November 26, 2011	Kitt Peak	Spacewatch	·	860 m	MPC · JPL
495367	2014 OO_{191}	—	July 30, 2010	WISE	WISE	·	560 m	MPC · JPL
495368	2014 OQ_{194}	—	November 15, 1999	Kitt Peak	Spacewatch	MAS	660 m	MPC · JPL
495369	2014 OF_{212}	—	May 7, 2014	Haleakala	Pan-STARRS 1	·	3.3 km	MPC · JPL
495370	2014 OZ_{215}	—	October 24, 2011	Haleakala	Pan-STARRS 1	·	830 m	MPC · JPL
495371	2014 OU_{231}	—	October 3, 1999	Kitt Peak	Spacewatch	NYS	910 m	MPC · JPL
495372	2014 OC_{233}	—	March 15, 2008	Kitt Peak	Spacewatch	WIT	960 m	MPC · JPL
495373	2014 OP_{237}	—	November 11, 2007	Mount Lemmon	Mount Lemmon Survey	·	1.8 km	MPC · JPL
495374	2014 OC_{282}	—	May 12, 2013	Haleakala	Pan-STARRS 1	·	3.2 km	MPC · JPL
495375	2014 OY_{303}	—	April 18, 2007	Kitt Peak	Spacewatch	·	580 m	MPC · JPL
495376	2014 OZ_{333}	—	February 13, 2012	Haleakala	Pan-STARRS 1	·	1.8 km	MPC · JPL
495377	2014 OA_{335}	—	March 19, 2013	Haleakala	Pan-STARRS 1	AGN	1.0 km	MPC · JPL
495378	2014 OP_{339}	—	September 12, 2007	Catalina	CSS	·	760 m	MPC · JPL
495379	2014 OH_{355}	—	October 29, 2008	Kitt Peak	Spacewatch	·	500 m	MPC · JPL
495380	2014 OY_{364}	—	April 26, 2007	Mount Lemmon	Mount Lemmon Survey	·	3.4 km	MPC · JPL
495381	2014 OJ_{377}	—	July 25, 2014	Haleakala	Pan-STARRS 1	·	790 m	MPC · JPL
495382	2014 PK_{39}	—	August 4, 2014	Haleakala	Pan-STARRS 1	·	1.3 km	MPC · JPL
495383	2014 QO_{98}	—	July 30, 2014	Kitt Peak	Spacewatch	·	770 m	MPC · JPL
495384	2014 QX_{129}	—	March 7, 2013	Mount Lemmon	Mount Lemmon Survey	·	790 m	MPC · JPL
495385	2014 QL_{144}	—	January 30, 2009	Mount Lemmon	Mount Lemmon Survey	PHO	750 m	MPC · JPL
495386	2014 QK_{171}	—	October 24, 2011	Haleakala	Pan-STARRS 1	·	680 m	MPC · JPL
495387	2014 QL_{174}	—	November 5, 1999	Kitt Peak	Spacewatch	·	1.2 km	MPC · JPL
495388	2014 QL_{236}	—	September 10, 2007	Mount Lemmon	Mount Lemmon Survey	·	680 m	MPC · JPL
495389	2014 QX_{243}	—	May 12, 2012	Mount Lemmon	Mount Lemmon Survey	·	1.7 km	MPC · JPL
495390	2014 QE_{249}	—	February 17, 2013	Mount Lemmon	Mount Lemmon Survey	·	890 m	MPC · JPL
495391	2014 QK_{250}	—	April 10, 2013	Haleakala	Pan-STARRS 1	·	1.1 km	MPC · JPL
495392	2014 QE_{251}	—	February 16, 2012	Haleakala	Pan-STARRS 1	MAR	1.0 km	MPC · JPL
495393	2014 QB_{255}	—	August 1, 2010	WISE	WISE	·	1.4 km	MPC · JPL
495394	2014 QF_{263}	—	November 24, 2011	Haleakala	Pan-STARRS 1	·	1.7 km	MPC · JPL
495395	2014 QB_{268}	—	March 13, 2012	Mount Lemmon	Mount Lemmon Survey	·	1.6 km	MPC · JPL
495396	2014 QW_{276}	—	July 25, 2014	Haleakala	Pan-STARRS 1	·	1.2 km	MPC · JPL
495397	2014 QW_{306}	—	February 8, 2008	Kitt Peak	Spacewatch	·	1.4 km	MPC · JPL
495398	2014 QY_{310}	—	August 23, 2007	Kitt Peak	Spacewatch	·	520 m	MPC · JPL
495399	2014 QV_{315}	—	June 2, 2014	Mount Lemmon	Mount Lemmon Survey	·	610 m	MPC · JPL
495400	2014 QW_{331}	—	January 12, 1994	Kitt Peak	Spacewatch	·	1.7 km	MPC · JPL

== 495401–495500 ==
back to top

Designation			Discovery			Properties		Ref
Permanent	Provisional	Named after	Date	Site	Discoverer(s)	Category	Diam.	Ref
495401	2014 QO_{337}	—	March 4, 2005	Mount Lemmon	Mount Lemmon Survey	PHO	850 m	MPC · JPL
495402	2014 QW_{353}	—	September 10, 2007	Kitt Peak	Spacewatch	·	730 m	MPC · JPL
495403	2014 QC_{355}	—	August 27, 2014	Haleakala	Pan-STARRS 1	·	1.1 km	MPC · JPL
495404	2014 QF_{359}	—	August 23, 2007	Kitt Peak	Spacewatch	·	450 m	MPC · JPL
495405	2014 QG_{398}	—	March 2, 2008	Mount Lemmon	Mount Lemmon Survey	·	1.5 km	MPC · JPL
495406	2014 QY_{401}	—	September 14, 2007	Mount Lemmon	Mount Lemmon Survey	NYS	980 m	MPC · JPL
495407	2014 QH_{421}	—	December 2, 2010	Kitt Peak	Spacewatch	·	1.4 km	MPC · JPL
495408	2014 QY_{437}	—	November 26, 2009	Mount Lemmon	Mount Lemmon Survey	EOS	2.1 km	MPC · JPL
495409	2014 QQ_{438}	—	March 30, 2008	Kitt Peak	Spacewatch	·	1.6 km	MPC · JPL
495410	2014 RO_{19}	—	July 30, 2014	Kitt Peak	Spacewatch	PHO	1 km	MPC · JPL
495411	2014 RJ_{41}	—	January 30, 2012	Mount Lemmon	Mount Lemmon Survey	·	1.6 km	MPC · JPL
495412	2014 RL_{47}	—	January 4, 2010	Kitt Peak	Spacewatch	·	1.6 km	MPC · JPL
495413	2014 RG_{55}	—	October 4, 2007	Kitt Peak	Spacewatch	NYS	840 m	MPC · JPL
495414	2014 SR_{115}	—	April 11, 2013	Mount Lemmon	Mount Lemmon Survey	NYS	1.0 km	MPC · JPL
495415	2014 SP_{126}	—	September 18, 2006	Kitt Peak	Spacewatch	EUN	1.0 km	MPC · JPL
495416	2014 SZ_{135}	—	January 19, 2012	Mount Lemmon	Mount Lemmon Survey	MAS	740 m	MPC · JPL
495417	2014 SO_{143}	—	April 30, 2001	Kitt Peak	Spacewatch	AMO	380 m	MPC · JPL
495418	2014 SM_{145}	—	September 12, 2007	Catalina	CSS	·	830 m	MPC · JPL
495419	2014 SM_{148}	—	January 25, 2012	Haleakala	Pan-STARRS 1	PHO	1.1 km	MPC · JPL
495420	2014 SM_{154}	—	January 3, 2009	Kitt Peak	Spacewatch	·	880 m	MPC · JPL
495421	2014 SW_{154}	—	October 22, 2003	Kitt Peak	Spacewatch	·	970 m	MPC · JPL
495422	2014 SS_{155}	—	February 25, 2006	Kitt Peak	Spacewatch	·	980 m	MPC · JPL
495423	2014 SJ_{157}	—	October 4, 1999	Socorro	LINEAR	PHO	990 m	MPC · JPL
495424	2014 SP_{168}	—	November 24, 2011	Mount Lemmon	Mount Lemmon Survey	PHO	930 m	MPC · JPL
495425	2014 SP_{177}	—	July 31, 2014	Haleakala	Pan-STARRS 1	·	660 m	MPC · JPL
495426	2014 SD_{207}	—	December 7, 2005	Kitt Peak	Spacewatch	MRX	920 m	MPC · JPL
495427	2014 SL_{210}	—	July 15, 2013	Haleakala	Pan-STARRS 1	TEL	1.1 km	MPC · JPL
495428	2014 SZ_{211}	—	April 1, 2008	Mount Lemmon	Mount Lemmon Survey	EUN	1.2 km	MPC · JPL
495429	2014 SL_{214}	—	March 26, 2008	Mount Lemmon	Mount Lemmon Survey	RAF	1.0 km	MPC · JPL
495430	2014 SD_{215}	—	November 17, 2009	Mount Lemmon	Mount Lemmon Survey	·	2.9 km	MPC · JPL
495431	2014 SM_{215}	—	November 11, 2009	Catalina	CSS	WAT	2.5 km	MPC · JPL
495432	2014 SC_{218}	—	March 5, 2008	Mount Lemmon	Mount Lemmon Survey	WIT	1.0 km	MPC · JPL
495433	2014 SY_{219}	—	September 20, 2014	Haleakala	Pan-STARRS 1	·	2.5 km	MPC · JPL
495434	2014 SJ_{242}	—	January 30, 2009	Kitt Peak	Spacewatch	V	720 m	MPC · JPL
495435	2014 SC_{257}	—	November 1, 2005	Mount Lemmon	Mount Lemmon Survey	·	2.2 km	MPC · JPL
495436	2014 SE_{280}	—	April 10, 2013	Haleakala	Pan-STARRS 1	MAS	720 m	MPC · JPL
495437	2014 SG_{280}	—	November 25, 2005	Kitt Peak	Spacewatch	·	1.8 km	MPC · JPL
495438	2014 SX_{290}	—	September 14, 2014	Mount Lemmon	Mount Lemmon Survey	(5)	1.5 km	MPC · JPL
495439	2014 SD_{292}	—	September 12, 2010	Mount Lemmon	Mount Lemmon Survey	·	1.2 km	MPC · JPL
495440	2014 SN_{294}	—	September 20, 2001	Apache Point	SDSS	·	2.3 km	MPC · JPL
495441	2014 SH_{296}	—	October 12, 2010	Mount Lemmon	Mount Lemmon Survey	EUN	1.5 km	MPC · JPL
495442	2014 SV_{303}	—	September 24, 2014	Haleakala	Pan-STARRS 1	·	1.5 km	MPC · JPL
495443	2014 SD_{329}	—	September 27, 2014	Mount Lemmon	Mount Lemmon Survey	EUN	1.4 km	MPC · JPL
495444	2014 SU_{330}	—	September 25, 2014	Mount Lemmon	Mount Lemmon Survey	HNS	1.1 km	MPC · JPL
495445	2014 SD_{336}	—	February 28, 2012	Haleakala	Pan-STARRS 1	·	1.7 km	MPC · JPL
495446	2014 SH_{338}	—	March 28, 2008	Kitt Peak	Spacewatch	·	1.3 km	MPC · JPL
495447	2014 TY_{5}	—	June 21, 2010	Mount Lemmon	Mount Lemmon Survey	·	1.0 km	MPC · JPL
495448	2014 TJ_{7}	—	October 7, 2005	Kitt Peak	Spacewatch	·	1.8 km	MPC · JPL
495449	2014 TP_{7}	—	December 25, 2005	Kitt Peak	Spacewatch	KOR	1.3 km	MPC · JPL
495450	2014 TJ_{8}	—	February 13, 2008	Mount Lemmon	Mount Lemmon Survey	·	1.6 km	MPC · JPL
495451	2014 TP_{11}	—	November 2, 2005	Mount Lemmon	Mount Lemmon Survey	·	2.7 km	MPC · JPL
495452	2014 TL_{20}	—	April 1, 2012	Mount Lemmon	Mount Lemmon Survey	EOS	1.6 km	MPC · JPL
495453	2014 TE_{21}	—	December 30, 2007	Kitt Peak	Spacewatch	NYS	1.0 km	MPC · JPL
495454	2014 TB_{22}	—	November 10, 2010	Mount Lemmon	Mount Lemmon Survey	·	1.4 km	MPC · JPL
495455	2014 TM_{23}	—	November 6, 2010	Mount Lemmon	Mount Lemmon Survey	·	1.2 km	MPC · JPL
495456	2014 TK_{30}	—	January 10, 2007	Mount Lemmon	Mount Lemmon Survey	·	1.4 km	MPC · JPL
495457	2014 TR_{38}	—	March 14, 2012	Mount Lemmon	Mount Lemmon Survey	HNS	1.3 km	MPC · JPL
495458	2014 TY_{40}	—	September 30, 2005	Mount Lemmon	Mount Lemmon Survey	·	2.2 km	MPC · JPL
495459	2014 TO_{44}	—	October 2, 2014	Haleakala	Pan-STARRS 1	·	1.8 km	MPC · JPL
495460	2014 TO_{45}	—	October 2, 2005	Mount Lemmon	Mount Lemmon Survey	NEM	2.0 km	MPC · JPL
495461	2014 TE_{46}	—	April 15, 2013	Haleakala	Pan-STARRS 1	EUN	1.1 km	MPC · JPL
495462	2014 TL_{47}	—	March 12, 2000	Socorro	LINEAR	·	1.7 km	MPC · JPL
495463	2014 TE_{61}	—	November 10, 2010	Mount Lemmon	Mount Lemmon Survey	·	1.3 km	MPC · JPL
495464	2014 TK_{63}	—	August 8, 2001	Haleakala	NEAT	·	2.1 km	MPC · JPL
495465	2014 TX_{68}	—	November 11, 2010	Kitt Peak	Spacewatch	(5)	1.1 km	MPC · JPL
495466	2014 TJ_{73}	—	November 20, 2001	Socorro	LINEAR	WIT	1.3 km	MPC · JPL
495467	2014 TU_{73}	—	October 1, 2005	Kitt Peak	Spacewatch	·	1.4 km	MPC · JPL
495468	2014 TB_{74}	—	April 21, 2013	Mount Lemmon	Mount Lemmon Survey	·	1.2 km	MPC · JPL
495469	2014 TE_{75}	—	October 25, 2005	Kitt Peak	Spacewatch	·	1.8 km	MPC · JPL
495470	2014 TM_{82}	—	November 3, 2007	Mount Lemmon	Mount Lemmon Survey	·	1.2 km	MPC · JPL
495471	2014 UO_{6}	—	November 6, 2005	Mount Lemmon	Mount Lemmon Survey	AGN	1.1 km	MPC · JPL
495472	2014 UO_{17}	—	April 4, 2008	Mount Lemmon	Mount Lemmon Survey	·	1.9 km	MPC · JPL
495473	2014 UU_{17}	—	April 1, 2011	Mount Lemmon	Mount Lemmon Survey	·	2.4 km	MPC · JPL
495474	2014 UT_{20}	—	April 14, 2008	Mount Lemmon	Mount Lemmon Survey	·	1.9 km	MPC · JPL
495475	2014 UG_{22}	—	July 28, 2014	Haleakala	Pan-STARRS 1	·	1.3 km	MPC · JPL
495476	2014 UK_{25}	—	May 6, 2006	Mount Lemmon	Mount Lemmon Survey	·	3.3 km	MPC · JPL
495477	2014 UL_{25}	—	September 27, 2003	Socorro	LINEAR	EOS	2.4 km	MPC · JPL
495478	2014 UH_{26}	—	October 23, 2006	Mount Lemmon	Mount Lemmon Survey	·	1.1 km	MPC · JPL
495479	2014 UN_{31}	—	April 27, 2001	Kitt Peak	Spacewatch	·	1.0 km	MPC · JPL
495480	2014 UV_{31}	—	September 19, 2009	Kitt Peak	Spacewatch	·	2.2 km	MPC · JPL
495481	2014 UW_{45}	—	October 25, 2005	Mount Lemmon	Mount Lemmon Survey	·	1.8 km	MPC · JPL
495482	2014 UF_{54}	—	September 30, 2014	Mount Lemmon	Mount Lemmon Survey	EOS	1.6 km	MPC · JPL
495483	2014 UU_{55}	—	December 2, 2010	Mount Lemmon	Mount Lemmon Survey	KON	2.3 km	MPC · JPL
495484	2014 UM_{83}	—	October 9, 2008	Mount Lemmon	Mount Lemmon Survey	·	2.5 km	MPC · JPL
495485	2014 UE_{85}	—	November 14, 2010	Kitt Peak	Spacewatch	·	1.2 km	MPC · JPL
495486	2014 US_{88}	—	January 23, 2006	Mount Lemmon	Mount Lemmon Survey	KOR	1.2 km	MPC · JPL
495487	2014 UC_{89}	—	August 28, 1995	Kitt Peak	Spacewatch	·	1.5 km	MPC · JPL
495488	2014 UU_{98}	—	October 15, 2014	Kitt Peak	Spacewatch	·	2.6 km	MPC · JPL
495489	2014 UE_{99}	—	October 3, 2014	Mount Lemmon	Mount Lemmon Survey	EOS	1.7 km	MPC · JPL
495490	2014 UZ_{102}	—	January 28, 2007	Mount Lemmon	Mount Lemmon Survey	·	1.6 km	MPC · JPL
495491	2014 UD_{104}	—	November 2, 2007	Mount Lemmon	Mount Lemmon Survey	·	1.0 km	MPC · JPL
495492	2014 US_{105}	—	September 24, 2009	Mount Lemmon	Mount Lemmon Survey	·	2.1 km	MPC · JPL
495493	2014 UB_{110}	—	October 3, 2014	Mount Lemmon	Mount Lemmon Survey	·	2.7 km	MPC · JPL
495494	2014 UO_{126}	—	May 3, 2008	Mount Lemmon	Mount Lemmon Survey	AGN	1.0 km	MPC · JPL
495495	2014 UF_{136}	—	February 27, 2012	Haleakala	Pan-STARRS 1	·	1.4 km	MPC · JPL
495496	2014 UD_{137}	—	October 23, 2009	Mount Lemmon	Mount Lemmon Survey	·	1.9 km	MPC · JPL
495497	2014 UD_{139}	—	December 13, 2010	Mount Lemmon	Mount Lemmon Survey	·	1.4 km	MPC · JPL
495498	2014 UW_{153}	—	May 8, 2006	Mount Lemmon	Mount Lemmon Survey	·	1.5 km	MPC · JPL
495499	2014 UQ_{158}	—	November 3, 2005	Catalina	CSS	·	1.9 km	MPC · JPL
495500	2014 UL_{161}	—	September 21, 2009	Mount Lemmon	Mount Lemmon Survey	AGN	1.1 km	MPC · JPL

== 495501–495600 ==
back to top

Designation			Discovery			Properties		Ref
Permanent	Provisional	Named after	Date	Site	Discoverer(s)	Category	Diam.	Ref
495501	2014 UM_{162}	—	October 27, 2005	Kitt Peak	Spacewatch	·	1.7 km	MPC · JPL
495502	2014 UY_{170}	—	April 11, 2011	Mount Lemmon	Mount Lemmon Survey	·	2.6 km	MPC · JPL
495503	2014 UY_{172}	—	March 30, 2010	WISE	WISE	·	3.3 km	MPC · JPL
495504	2014 UV_{175}	—	November 14, 2007	Kitt Peak	Spacewatch	PHO	1 km	MPC · JPL
495505	2014 UJ_{176}	—	November 11, 2010	Mount Lemmon	Mount Lemmon Survey	·	1.3 km	MPC · JPL
495506	2014 UM_{177}	—	May 26, 2008	Kitt Peak	Spacewatch	·	1.6 km	MPC · JPL
495507	2014 UK_{180}	—	December 17, 2007	Kitt Peak	Spacewatch	·	1.3 km	MPC · JPL
495508	2014 UW_{187}	—	October 28, 2014	Haleakala	Pan-STARRS 1	·	1.8 km	MPC · JPL
495509	2014 UR_{198}	—	October 9, 2010	Mount Lemmon	Mount Lemmon Survey	·	1.6 km	MPC · JPL
495510	2014 UQ_{200}	—	September 30, 2005	Mount Lemmon	Mount Lemmon Survey	·	2.1 km	MPC · JPL
495511	2014 UD_{206}	—	October 31, 2014	Mount Lemmon	Mount Lemmon Survey	AMO	470 m	MPC · JPL
495512	2014 UM_{208}	—	October 8, 2008	Kitt Peak	Spacewatch	·	2.5 km	MPC · JPL
495513	2014 UC_{217}	—	July 11, 2005	Mount Lemmon	Mount Lemmon Survey	·	1.9 km	MPC · JPL
495514	2014 UF_{220}	—	June 30, 2014	Haleakala	Pan-STARRS 1	·	2.4 km	MPC · JPL
495515	2014 UC_{223}	—	July 30, 2014	Kitt Peak	Spacewatch	EUN	1.7 km	MPC · JPL
495516	2014 VA_{5}	—	October 30, 2010	Kitt Peak	Spacewatch	·	1.3 km	MPC · JPL
495517	2014 VR_{13}	—	October 21, 2014	Catalina	CSS	·	1.9 km	MPC · JPL
495518	2014 VY_{13}	—	December 25, 2010	Mount Lemmon	Mount Lemmon Survey	EUN	970 m	MPC · JPL
495519	2014 VR_{20}	—	November 29, 2005	Kitt Peak	Spacewatch	·	2.0 km	MPC · JPL
495520	2014 VA_{24}	—	October 3, 2014	Mount Lemmon	Mount Lemmon Survey	·	2.9 km	MPC · JPL
495521	2014 VY_{27}	—	November 10, 2010	Mount Lemmon	Mount Lemmon Survey	·	1.5 km	MPC · JPL
495522	2014 VJ_{33}	—	October 1, 2009	Mount Lemmon	Mount Lemmon Survey	·	1.9 km	MPC · JPL
495523	2014 WE_{4}	—	December 18, 2009	Mount Lemmon	Mount Lemmon Survey	·	2.4 km	MPC · JPL
495524	2014 WS_{9}	—	February 27, 2012	Haleakala	Pan-STARRS 1	·	1.4 km	MPC · JPL
495525	2014 WA_{25}	—	January 23, 2011	Mount Lemmon	Mount Lemmon Survey	HOF	2.4 km	MPC · JPL
495526	2014 WC_{31}	—	December 4, 2005	Kitt Peak	Spacewatch	·	1.7 km	MPC · JPL
495527	2014 WL_{39}	—	October 26, 2014	Mount Lemmon	Mount Lemmon Survey	·	1.9 km	MPC · JPL
495528	2014 WH_{44}	—	March 2, 2011	Mount Lemmon	Mount Lemmon Survey	·	1.7 km	MPC · JPL
495529	2014 WW_{44}	—	October 7, 2004	Kitt Peak	Spacewatch	·	1.9 km	MPC · JPL
495530	2014 WQ_{49}	—	April 15, 2012	Haleakala	Pan-STARRS 1	·	1.6 km	MPC · JPL
495531	2014 WO_{52}	—	June 20, 2001	Palomar	NEAT	·	1.5 km	MPC · JPL
495532	2014 WB_{54}	—	October 16, 2009	Mount Lemmon	Mount Lemmon Survey	·	1.5 km	MPC · JPL
495533	2014 WH_{57}	—	October 5, 2014	Mount Lemmon	Mount Lemmon Survey	EOS	1.7 km	MPC · JPL
495534	2014 WG_{60}	—	December 7, 2005	Kitt Peak	Spacewatch	AGN	1.2 km	MPC · JPL
495535	2014 WJ_{67}	—	May 8, 2013	Haleakala	Pan-STARRS 1	·	1.3 km	MPC · JPL
495536	2014 WK_{82}	—	December 1, 2010	Mount Lemmon	Mount Lemmon Survey	·	1.1 km	MPC · JPL
495537	2014 WH_{95}	—	August 15, 2013	Haleakala	Pan-STARRS 1	·	2.1 km	MPC · JPL
495538	2014 WA_{99}	—	August 2, 2013	Haleakala	Pan-STARRS 1	·	1.6 km	MPC · JPL
495539	2014 WC_{108}	—	November 8, 2010	Kitt Peak	Spacewatch	·	1.5 km	MPC · JPL
495540	2014 WJ_{129}	—	January 25, 2011	Mount Lemmon	Mount Lemmon Survey	·	2.5 km	MPC · JPL
495541	2014 WL_{136}	—	November 17, 2014	Haleakala	Pan-STARRS 1	·	1.8 km	MPC · JPL
495542	2014 WW_{139}	—	November 17, 2008	Kitt Peak	Spacewatch	·	2.4 km	MPC · JPL
495543	2014 WD_{140}	—	October 31, 2006	Mount Lemmon	Mount Lemmon Survey	·	870 m	MPC · JPL
495544	2014 WW_{140}	—	October 30, 2005	Kitt Peak	Spacewatch	·	1.4 km	MPC · JPL
495545	2014 WO_{144}	—	October 9, 2008	Kitt Peak	Spacewatch	·	2.4 km	MPC · JPL
495546	2014 WG_{150}	—	December 3, 2010	Mount Lemmon	Mount Lemmon Survey	·	1.8 km	MPC · JPL
495547	2014 WF_{159}	—	April 1, 2010	WISE	WISE	·	2.5 km	MPC · JPL
495548	2014 WB_{166}	—	November 4, 2005	Kitt Peak	Spacewatch	HOF	2.6 km	MPC · JPL
495549	2014 WV_{169}	—	July 14, 2004	Siding Spring	SSS	·	600 m	MPC · JPL
495550	2014 WA_{188}	—	February 28, 2012	Haleakala	Pan-STARRS 1	·	1.3 km	MPC · JPL
495551	2014 WZ_{198}	—	July 15, 2013	Haleakala	Pan-STARRS 1	EOS	1.7 km	MPC · JPL
495552	2014 WS_{200}	—	June 15, 2010	Siding Spring	SSS	·	1.1 km	MPC · JPL
495553	2014 WF_{207}	—	November 7, 2010	Mount Lemmon	Mount Lemmon Survey	KON	2.6 km	MPC · JPL
495554	2014 WK_{221}	—	October 25, 2014	Haleakala	Pan-STARRS 1	EOS	1.9 km	MPC · JPL
495555	2014 WY_{230}	—	November 9, 2009	Kitt Peak	Spacewatch	·	3.4 km	MPC · JPL
495556	2014 WU_{237}	—	September 25, 2014	Catalina	CSS	GEF	1.3 km	MPC · JPL
495557	2014 WN_{238}	—	April 6, 2005	Mount Lemmon	Mount Lemmon Survey	·	2.4 km	MPC · JPL
495558	2014 WO_{241}	—	November 20, 2014	Haleakala	Pan-STARRS 1	·	2.6 km	MPC · JPL
495559	2014 WS_{260}	—	September 20, 2014	Haleakala	Pan-STARRS 1	·	2.5 km	MPC · JPL
495560	2014 WO_{281}	—	April 2, 2011	Mount Lemmon	Mount Lemmon Survey	·	3.3 km	MPC · JPL
495561	2014 WG_{298}	—	July 15, 2013	Haleakala	Pan-STARRS 1	EOS	1.6 km	MPC · JPL
495562	2014 WF_{313}	—	April 15, 2012	Haleakala	Pan-STARRS 1	·	2.1 km	MPC · JPL
495563	2014 WG_{325}	—	April 30, 2012	Kitt Peak	Spacewatch	EOS	2.0 km	MPC · JPL
495564	2014 WW_{328}	—	March 12, 2011	Mount Lemmon	Mount Lemmon Survey	EOS	1.7 km	MPC · JPL
495565	2014 WC_{341}	—	November 19, 2009	Kitt Peak	Spacewatch	·	2.8 km	MPC · JPL
495566	2014 WH_{345}	—	December 6, 2010	Mount Lemmon	Mount Lemmon Survey	·	1.2 km	MPC · JPL
495567	2014 WK_{397}	—	April 4, 2010	WISE	WISE	T_{j} (2.97) · EUP	2.7 km	MPC · JPL
495568	2014 WF_{399}	—	December 21, 2003	Kitt Peak	Spacewatch	·	4.2 km	MPC · JPL
495569	2014 WQ_{415}	—	September 30, 2003	Kitt Peak	Spacewatch	·	2.1 km	MPC · JPL
495570	2014 WJ_{416}	—	September 27, 2005	Socorro	LINEAR	ADE	2.7 km	MPC · JPL
495571	2014 WV_{416}	—	May 20, 2006	Kitt Peak	Spacewatch	·	3.4 km	MPC · JPL
495572	2014 WQ_{417}	—	October 26, 2005	Kitt Peak	Spacewatch	·	1.7 km	MPC · JPL
495573	2014 WU_{476}	—	May 2, 2006	Mount Lemmon	Mount Lemmon Survey	·	3.1 km	MPC · JPL
495574	2014 WC_{492}	—	September 17, 2009	Catalina	CSS	JUN	1.0 km	MPC · JPL
495575	2014 WJ_{494}	—	February 13, 2010	Mount Lemmon	Mount Lemmon Survey	·	3.1 km	MPC · JPL
495576	2014 WW_{501}	—	May 25, 2012	Tenerife	ESA OGS	·	3.9 km	MPC · JPL
495577	2014 WY_{505}	—	October 21, 2003	Anderson Mesa	LONEOS	·	2.9 km	MPC · JPL
495578	2014 XD_{19}	—	May 8, 2013	Haleakala	Pan-STARRS 1	·	1.1 km	MPC · JPL
495579	2014 XA_{23}	—	October 6, 2008	Mount Lemmon	Mount Lemmon Survey	·	2.9 km	MPC · JPL
495580	2014 YU_{7}	—	December 20, 2014	Kitt Peak	Spacewatch	·	2.0 km	MPC · JPL
495581	2014 YU_{11}	—	November 18, 2014	Haleakala	Pan-STARRS 1	·	2.2 km	MPC · JPL
495582	2014 YS_{44}	—	November 18, 2009	Mount Lemmon	Mount Lemmon Survey	EOS	2.0 km	MPC · JPL
495583	2014 YV_{45}	—	January 15, 2004	Kitt Peak	Spacewatch	LIX	3.7 km	MPC · JPL
495584	2015 AW	—	November 22, 2006	Mount Lemmon	Mount Lemmon Survey	·	1.4 km	MPC · JPL
495585	2015 AW_{1}	—	October 27, 2014	Haleakala	Pan-STARRS 1	·	1.8 km	MPC · JPL
495586	2015 AR_{12}	—	July 13, 2013	Haleakala	Pan-STARRS 1	·	3.1 km	MPC · JPL
495587	2015 AQ_{23}	—	March 19, 2010	WISE	WISE	·	2.1 km	MPC · JPL
495588	2015 AG_{25}	—	March 31, 2010	WISE	WISE	·	3.1 km	MPC · JPL
495589	2015 AR_{32}	—	April 13, 2011	Mount Lemmon	Mount Lemmon Survey	·	2.2 km	MPC · JPL
495590	2015 AK_{68}	—	January 15, 2010	Mount Lemmon	Mount Lemmon Survey	EOS	2.0 km	MPC · JPL
495591	2015 AZ_{77}	—	August 14, 2013	Haleakala	Pan-STARRS 1	V	660 m	MPC · JPL
495592	2015 AY_{181}	—	February 17, 2010	Kitt Peak	Spacewatch	·	2.3 km	MPC · JPL
495593	2015 AS_{193}	—	February 14, 2004	Kitt Peak	Spacewatch	HYG	2.5 km	MPC · JPL
495594	2015 AX_{223}	—	June 21, 2012	Catalina	CSS	·	2.6 km	MPC · JPL
495595	2015 AS_{237}	—	March 26, 2011	Haleakala	Pan-STARRS 1	·	1.7 km	MPC · JPL
495596	2015 AV_{238}	—	November 7, 2008	Mount Lemmon	Mount Lemmon Survey	·	2.0 km	MPC · JPL
495597	2015 AB_{242}	—	December 22, 2008	Mount Lemmon	Mount Lemmon Survey	EOS	2.2 km	MPC · JPL
495598	2015 AW_{256}	—	December 19, 2003	Kitt Peak	Spacewatch	VER	4.5 km	MPC · JPL
495599	2015 AK_{264}	—	April 24, 2003	Kitt Peak	Spacewatch	CYB	3.9 km	MPC · JPL
495600	2015 AC_{274}	—	January 26, 2011	Mount Lemmon	Mount Lemmon Survey	EUN	1.3 km	MPC · JPL

== 495601–495700 ==
back to top

Designation			Discovery			Properties		Ref
Permanent	Provisional	Named after	Date	Site	Discoverer(s)	Category	Diam.	Ref
495601	2015 AV_{277}	—	December 22, 2003	Kitt Peak	Spacewatch	·	2.8 km	MPC · JPL
495602	2015 AP_{278}	—	January 15, 2015	Haleakala	Pan-STARRS 1	·	3.0 km	MPC · JPL
495603	2015 AM_{281}	—	March 13, 2010	Haleakala	Pan-STARRS 1	res · 2:5	412 km	MPC · JPL
495604	2015 BW_{21}	—	December 4, 2008	Kitt Peak	Spacewatch	·	3.3 km	MPC · JPL
495605	2015 BP_{146}	—	April 1, 2012	Mount Lemmon	Mount Lemmon Survey	(2076)	700 m	MPC · JPL
495606	2015 BL_{218}	—	November 7, 2008	Mount Lemmon	Mount Lemmon Survey	URS	2.7 km	MPC · JPL
495607	2015 BT_{239}	—	September 11, 2007	Catalina	CSS	·	3.3 km	MPC · JPL
495608	2015 BX_{500}	—	November 1, 2008	Mount Lemmon	Mount Lemmon Survey	·	3.5 km	MPC · JPL
495609	2015 DG_{11}	—	December 27, 2006	Mount Lemmon	Mount Lemmon Survey	H	550 m	MPC · JPL
495610	2015 DS_{108}	—	November 4, 2007	Mount Lemmon	Mount Lemmon Survey	·	3.9 km	MPC · JPL
495611	2015 DY_{154}	—	March 28, 2008	Kitt Peak	Spacewatch	·	1.2 km	MPC · JPL
495612	2015 ET_{1}	—	May 23, 2006	Kitt Peak	Spacewatch	·	690 m	MPC · JPL
495613	2015 FG_{345}	—	March 18, 2015	Haleakala	Pan-STARRS 1	cubewano (hot)	406 km	MPC · JPL
495614	2015 HB_{175}	—	September 15, 2006	Kitt Peak	Spacewatch	·	1.8 km	MPC · JPL
495615	2015 PQ_{291}	—	August 10, 2015	Haleakala	Pan-STARRS 1	ATE +1km	1.0 km	MPC · JPL
495616	2015 RA_{19}	—	November 6, 2005	Mount Lemmon	Mount Lemmon Survey	·	680 m	MPC · JPL
495617	2015 RS_{77}	—	January 5, 2006	Mount Lemmon	Mount Lemmon Survey	·	1.7 km	MPC · JPL
495618	2015 SN_{2}	—	April 16, 2004	Kitt Peak	Spacewatch	H	400 m	MPC · JPL
495619	2015 TB_{8}	—	April 15, 2012	Haleakala	Pan-STARRS 1	H	430 m	MPC · JPL
495620	2015 TH_{137}	—	October 8, 2015	Haleakala	Pan-STARRS 1	·	2.2 km	MPC · JPL
495621	2015 TK_{157}	—	October 21, 2008	Mount Lemmon	Mount Lemmon Survey	V	540 m	MPC · JPL
495622	2015 TG_{189}	—	November 7, 2010	Catalina	CSS	H	490 m	MPC · JPL
495623	2015 TD_{233}	—	September 7, 2008	Mount Lemmon	Mount Lemmon Survey	·	970 m	MPC · JPL
495624	2015 TK_{239}	—	August 29, 2015	Haleakala	Pan-STARRS 1	H	470 m	MPC · JPL
495625	2015 TC_{243}	—	November 17, 2011	Kitt Peak	Spacewatch	·	1.2 km	MPC · JPL
495626	2015 TW_{255}	—	December 17, 2003	Socorro	LINEAR	·	1.5 km	MPC · JPL
495627	2015 TS_{336}	—	December 2, 2012	Mount Lemmon	Mount Lemmon Survey	·	640 m	MPC · JPL
495628	2015 UH_{7}	—	October 10, 2007	Catalina	CSS	H	460 m	MPC · JPL
495629	2015 VF_{36}	—	December 29, 2008	Mount Lemmon	Mount Lemmon Survey	NYS	980 m	MPC · JPL
495630	2015 VW_{57}	—	March 11, 1996	Kitt Peak	Spacewatch	·	590 m	MPC · JPL
495631	2015 VF_{125}	—	February 13, 2009	Mount Lemmon	Mount Lemmon Survey	H	630 m	MPC · JPL
495632	2015 WE_{7}	—	November 25, 2011	Haleakala	Pan-STARRS 1	·	1.2 km	MPC · JPL
495633	2015 XD_{86}	—	January 19, 2012	Catalina	CSS	·	1.3 km	MPC · JPL
495634	2015 XE_{107}	—	December 2, 2010	Kitt Peak	Spacewatch	THB	2.4 km	MPC · JPL
495635	2015 XH_{132}	—	December 30, 2011	Mount Lemmon	Mount Lemmon Survey	JUN	1.0 km	MPC · JPL
495636	2015 XH_{141}	—	December 4, 2015	Mount Lemmon	Mount Lemmon Survey	PHO	1.1 km	MPC · JPL
495637	2015 XA_{168}	—	April 27, 2012	Haleakala	Pan-STARRS 1	BRA	1.4 km	MPC · JPL
495638	2015 XY_{171}	—	April 30, 2009	Mount Lemmon	Mount Lemmon Survey	HNS	1.1 km	MPC · JPL
495639	2015 XU_{198}	—	January 21, 2012	Haleakala	Pan-STARRS 1	·	1.6 km	MPC · JPL
495640	2015 XV_{210}	—	June 30, 2008	Kitt Peak	Spacewatch	·	650 m	MPC · JPL
495641	2015 XV_{224}	—	December 11, 2002	Socorro	LINEAR	·	1.5 km	MPC · JPL
495642	2015 XL_{237}	—	November 18, 2007	Kitt Peak	Spacewatch	·	870 m	MPC · JPL
495643	2015 XS_{315}	—	April 12, 2013	Haleakala	Pan-STARRS 1	·	800 m	MPC · JPL
495644	2015 XR_{333}	—	January 19, 2008	Mount Lemmon	Mount Lemmon Survey	·	1.3 km	MPC · JPL
495645	2015 YL_{19}	—	April 9, 2013	Haleakala	Pan-STARRS 1	·	1.6 km	MPC · JPL
495646	2016 AJ_{6}	—	December 15, 2007	Mount Lemmon	Mount Lemmon Survey	·	1.3 km	MPC · JPL
495647	2016 AG_{12}	—	December 31, 2015	Kitt Peak	Spacewatch	·	2.6 km	MPC · JPL
495648	2016 AS_{23}	—	December 14, 2001	Kitt Peak	Spacewatch	·	2.5 km	MPC · JPL
495649	2016 AV_{44}	—	December 21, 2006	Catalina	CSS	HNS	1.3 km	MPC · JPL
495650	2016 AV_{51}	—	September 24, 2011	Haleakala	Pan-STARRS 1	·	950 m	MPC · JPL
495651	2016 AE_{55}	—	February 5, 2011	Mount Lemmon	Mount Lemmon Survey	·	1.8 km	MPC · JPL
495652	2016 AP_{56}	—	September 17, 2004	Kitt Peak	Spacewatch	GEF	1.6 km	MPC · JPL
495653	2016 AH_{67}	—	December 25, 2010	Mount Lemmon	Mount Lemmon Survey	·	1.7 km	MPC · JPL
495654	2016 AM_{70}	—	December 18, 1995	Kitt Peak	Spacewatch	·	1.1 km	MPC · JPL
495655	2016 AG_{72}	—	January 15, 2005	Kitt Peak	Spacewatch	·	2.2 km	MPC · JPL
495656	2016 AX_{76}	—	June 24, 2010	Mount Lemmon	Mount Lemmon Survey	PHO	890 m	MPC · JPL
495657	2016 AZ_{77}	—	November 1, 2008	Mount Lemmon	Mount Lemmon Survey	·	4.1 km	MPC · JPL
495658	2016 AK_{100}	—	November 10, 2009	Kitt Peak	Spacewatch	·	1.6 km	MPC · JPL
495659	2016 AO_{100}	—	August 21, 2006	Kitt Peak	Spacewatch	JUN	1.0 km	MPC · JPL
495660	2016 AO_{102}	—	August 31, 2013	Haleakala	Pan-STARRS 1	·	3.6 km	MPC · JPL
495661	2016 AQ_{103}	—	November 26, 2005	Mount Lemmon	Mount Lemmon Survey	HOF	2.4 km	MPC · JPL
495662	2016 AY_{107}	—	January 26, 2011	Mount Lemmon	Mount Lemmon Survey	·	1.9 km	MPC · JPL
495663	2016 AL_{114}	—	November 18, 2014	Mount Lemmon	Mount Lemmon Survey	·	1.6 km	MPC · JPL
495664	2016 AE_{116}	—	February 17, 2007	Kitt Peak	Spacewatch	HOF	2.4 km	MPC · JPL
495665	2016 AV_{116}	—	August 12, 2013	Haleakala	Pan-STARRS 1	·	2.1 km	MPC · JPL
495666	2016 AG_{122}	—	August 9, 2013	Haleakala	Pan-STARRS 1	·	3.5 km	MPC · JPL
495667	2016 AN_{125}	—	January 26, 2007	Kitt Peak	Spacewatch	·	1.9 km	MPC · JPL
495668	2016 AV_{141}	—	June 8, 2008	Kitt Peak	Spacewatch	·	3.1 km	MPC · JPL
495669	2016 AJ_{147}	—	October 18, 2014	Mount Lemmon	Mount Lemmon Survey	·	1.6 km	MPC · JPL
495670	2016 AV_{148}	—	December 14, 2001	Socorro	LINEAR	·	2.6 km	MPC · JPL
495671	2016 AG_{155}	—	March 31, 2008	Mount Lemmon	Mount Lemmon Survey	MAR	950 m	MPC · JPL
495672	2016 AT_{157}	—	February 29, 2000	Socorro	LINEAR	·	2.4 km	MPC · JPL
495673	2016 AN_{168}	—	December 6, 2002	Socorro	LINEAR	EUN	1.2 km	MPC · JPL
495674	2016 AT_{168}	—	May 2, 2006	Mount Lemmon	Mount Lemmon Survey	·	4.0 km	MPC · JPL
495675	2016 AB_{172}	—	October 12, 2007	Catalina	CSS	PHO	1.2 km	MPC · JPL
495676	2016 AG_{181}	—	August 26, 2013	Haleakala	Pan-STARRS 1	EUN	1.4 km	MPC · JPL
495677	2016 AW_{189}	—	January 8, 2011	Mount Lemmon	Mount Lemmon Survey	·	2.6 km	MPC · JPL
495678	2016 BK_{2}	—	January 10, 2007	Mount Lemmon	Mount Lemmon Survey	·	1.7 km	MPC · JPL
495679	2016 BC_{16}	—	February 15, 2012	Haleakala	Pan-STARRS 1	·	1.2 km	MPC · JPL
495680	2016 BG_{32}	—	September 16, 2003	Kitt Peak	Spacewatch	·	1.9 km	MPC · JPL
495681	2016 BF_{33}	—	November 6, 2005	Kitt Peak	Spacewatch	·	2.1 km	MPC · JPL
495682	2016 BR_{34}	—	April 26, 2008	Kitt Peak	Spacewatch	·	2.3 km	MPC · JPL
495683	2016 BN_{38}	—	March 28, 2011	Catalina	CSS	VER	2.5 km	MPC · JPL
495684	2016 BS_{45}	—	April 1, 2008	Kitt Peak	Spacewatch	·	1.6 km	MPC · JPL
495685	2016 BM_{54}	—	February 2, 2008	Kitt Peak	Spacewatch	·	1.2 km	MPC · JPL
495686	2016 BY_{57}	—	November 19, 2006	Kitt Peak	Spacewatch	·	980 m	MPC · JPL
495687	2016 BO_{60}	—	December 25, 2005	Mount Lemmon	Mount Lemmon Survey	KOR	1.0 km	MPC · JPL
495688	2016 BH_{68}	—	March 5, 2011	Catalina	CSS	·	2.7 km	MPC · JPL
495689	2016 BA_{69}	—	October 30, 2005	Mount Lemmon	Mount Lemmon Survey	·	1.5 km	MPC · JPL
495690	2016 CL	—	October 14, 2014	Mount Lemmon	Mount Lemmon Survey	·	1.7 km	MPC · JPL
495691	2016 CH_{1}	—	October 4, 2003	Kitt Peak	Spacewatch	·	4.2 km	MPC · JPL
495692	2016 CU_{1}	—	May 2, 2008	Kitt Peak	Spacewatch	·	1.5 km	MPC · JPL
495693	2016 CX_{8}	—	April 2, 2006	Kitt Peak	Spacewatch	·	2.2 km	MPC · JPL
495694	2016 CE_{10}	—	March 6, 2011	Mount Lemmon	Mount Lemmon Survey	·	2.7 km	MPC · JPL
495695	2016 CF_{10}	—	December 31, 2011	Kitt Peak	Spacewatch	·	1.1 km	MPC · JPL
495696	2016 CH_{11}	—	December 10, 2005	Kitt Peak	Spacewatch	HOF	2.3 km	MPC · JPL
495697	2016 CN_{11}	—	March 16, 2010	WISE	WISE	HYG	2.9 km	MPC · JPL
495698	2016 CG_{12}	—	January 17, 2007	Kitt Peak	Spacewatch	EUN	1.5 km	MPC · JPL
495699	2016 CH_{13}	—	May 24, 2006	Kitt Peak	Spacewatch	·	2.7 km	MPC · JPL
495700	2016 CJ_{19}	—	September 14, 2009	Catalina	CSS	·	2.3 km	MPC · JPL

== 495701–495800 ==
back to top

Designation			Discovery			Properties		Ref
Permanent	Provisional	Named after	Date	Site	Discoverer(s)	Category	Diam.	Ref
495701	2016 CZ_{21}	—	December 19, 2004	Mount Lemmon	Mount Lemmon Survey	·	3.1 km	MPC · JPL
495702	2016 CP_{36}	—	January 28, 2000	Kitt Peak	Spacewatch	·	1.0 km	MPC · JPL
495703	2016 CN_{37}	—	October 29, 2005	Mount Lemmon	Mount Lemmon Survey	·	1.6 km	MPC · JPL
495704	2016 CZ_{46}	—	October 2, 2014	Haleakala	Pan-STARRS 1	·	1.4 km	MPC · JPL
495705	2016 CQ_{49}	—	May 20, 2006	Kitt Peak	Spacewatch	·	2.7 km	MPC · JPL
495706	2016 CL_{52}	—	October 25, 2005	Mount Lemmon	Mount Lemmon Survey	·	1.9 km	MPC · JPL
495707	2016 CT_{61}	—	September 7, 2014	Haleakala	Pan-STARRS 1	·	2.0 km	MPC · JPL
495708	2016 CJ_{63}	—	August 14, 2012	Siding Spring	SSS	(69559)	3.8 km	MPC · JPL
495709	2016 CL_{70}	—	March 14, 2010	WISE	WISE	·	5.1 km	MPC · JPL
495710	2016 CD_{77}	—	April 17, 2013	Haleakala	Pan-STARRS 1	·	1.2 km	MPC · JPL
495711	2016 CL_{80}	—	October 11, 2005	Kitt Peak	Spacewatch	3:2	5.8 km	MPC · JPL
495712	2016 CY_{83}	—	March 10, 2010	WISE	WISE	·	5.0 km	MPC · JPL
495713	2016 CG_{92}	—	April 30, 2010	WISE	WISE	·	3.6 km	MPC · JPL
495714	2016 CN_{102}	—	October 12, 2009	Mount Lemmon	Mount Lemmon Survey	EOS	1.6 km	MPC · JPL
495715	2016 CB_{106}	—	October 17, 2009	Mount Lemmon	Mount Lemmon Survey	·	2.0 km	MPC · JPL
495716	2016 CO_{110}	—	May 13, 2008	Mount Lemmon	Mount Lemmon Survey	·	1.5 km	MPC · JPL
495717	2016 CC_{120}	—	October 25, 2005	Kitt Peak	Spacewatch	WIT	900 m	MPC · JPL
495718	2016 CT_{133}	—	October 25, 2011	Haleakala	Pan-STARRS 1	·	710 m	MPC · JPL
495719	2016 CM_{138}	—	May 23, 2006	Kitt Peak	Spacewatch	·	2.8 km	MPC · JPL
495720	2016 CL_{142}	—	March 3, 2006	Kitt Peak	Spacewatch	·	1.9 km	MPC · JPL
495721	2016 CP_{194}	—	December 14, 2001	Socorro	LINEAR	H	690 m	MPC · JPL
495722	2016 CO_{200}	—	January 16, 2011	Mount Lemmon	Mount Lemmon Survey	·	1.8 km	MPC · JPL
495723	2016 CF_{201}	—	February 25, 2007	Mount Lemmon	Mount Lemmon Survey	·	1.6 km	MPC · JPL
495724	2016 CL_{205}	—	October 17, 2009	Mount Lemmon	Mount Lemmon Survey	HOF	2.1 km	MPC · JPL
495725	2016 CN_{205}	—	August 12, 2013	Haleakala	Pan-STARRS 1	·	2.1 km	MPC · JPL
495726	2016 CW_{206}	—	May 27, 2012	Mount Lemmon	Mount Lemmon Survey	EOS	1.7 km	MPC · JPL
495727	2016 CH_{208}	—	April 8, 2010	WISE	WISE	·	4.3 km	MPC · JPL
495728	2016 CS_{226}	—	October 21, 2014	Kitt Peak	Spacewatch	·	1.2 km	MPC · JPL
495729	2016 CB_{249}	—	October 29, 2010	Catalina	CSS	JUN	1.1 km	MPC · JPL
495730	2016 CO_{263}	—	March 18, 2010	WISE	WISE	·	2.6 km	MPC · JPL
495731	2016 DB_{3}	—	October 9, 1996	Kitt Peak	Spacewatch	·	2.4 km	MPC · JPL
495732	2016 DD_{4}	—	September 1, 2005	Kitt Peak	Spacewatch	·	1.8 km	MPC · JPL
495733	2016 DQ_{13}	—	September 12, 2004	Kitt Peak	Spacewatch	·	2.0 km	MPC · JPL
495734	2016 DX_{14}	—	April 29, 2008	Mount Lemmon	Mount Lemmon Survey	MIS	3.0 km	MPC · JPL
495735	2016 DG_{19}	—	April 19, 2010	WISE	WISE	·	4.1 km	MPC · JPL
495736	2016 DK_{26}	—	December 30, 2008	Catalina	CSS	·	3.8 km	MPC · JPL
495737	2016 EM	—	February 29, 2008	Catalina	CSS	·	2.4 km	MPC · JPL
495738	2016 EH_{47}	—	January 15, 2004	Kitt Peak	Spacewatch	·	3.4 km	MPC · JPL
495739	2016 EW_{63}	—	October 10, 2010	Kitt Peak	Spacewatch	·	2.0 km	MPC · JPL
495740	2016 EV_{67}	—	March 14, 2011	Mount Lemmon	Mount Lemmon Survey	EOS	1.6 km	MPC · JPL
495741	2016 EW_{75}	—	October 10, 2004	Kitt Peak	Spacewatch	KOR	1.2 km	MPC · JPL
495742	2016 EE_{76}	—	March 13, 2011	Kitt Peak	Spacewatch	·	2.3 km	MPC · JPL
495743	2016 EJ_{77}	—	October 21, 2003	Kitt Peak	Spacewatch	·	2.3 km	MPC · JPL
495744	2016 EO_{81}	—	November 21, 2009	Mount Lemmon	Mount Lemmon Survey	·	3.8 km	MPC · JPL
495745	2016 EF_{83}	—	January 2, 2009	Mount Lemmon	Mount Lemmon Survey	CYB	5.4 km	MPC · JPL
495746	2016 EL_{89}	—	February 5, 2011	Haleakala	Pan-STARRS 1	KOR	1.1 km	MPC · JPL
495747	2016 EN_{89}	—	February 28, 2012	Haleakala	Pan-STARRS 1	·	1.5 km	MPC · JPL
495748	2016 EE_{93}	—	September 14, 2013	Haleakala	Pan-STARRS 1	EMA	3.1 km	MPC · JPL
495749	2016 EO_{105}	—	November 1, 2008	Mount Lemmon	Mount Lemmon Survey	·	2.9 km	MPC · JPL
495750	2016 ET_{109}	—	August 11, 2012	Haleakala	Pan-STARRS 1	T_{j} (2.98) · EUP	3.9 km	MPC · JPL
495751	2016 EA_{173}	—	November 20, 2014	Haleakala	Pan-STARRS 1	·	2.4 km	MPC · JPL
495752	2016 EB_{187}	—	October 21, 2008	Kitt Peak	Spacewatch	·	3.4 km	MPC · JPL
495753	2016 FY_{43}	—	October 3, 1999	Catalina	CSS	PHO	930 m	MPC · JPL
495754	2016 GZ_{34}	—	May 3, 2005	Kitt Peak	Spacewatch	THB	2.6 km	MPC · JPL
495755	2016 GA_{210}	—	March 8, 2005	Mount Lemmon	Mount Lemmon Survey	·	2.8 km	MPC · JPL
495756	2016 GE_{243}	—	November 6, 2008	Mount Lemmon	Mount Lemmon Survey	·	3.4 km	MPC · JPL
495757	2017 AB	—	November 25, 2009	Kitt Peak	Spacewatch	·	640 m	MPC · JPL
495758	2017 BQ_{13}	—	February 5, 2011	Catalina	CSS	T_{j} (2.97)	3.1 km	MPC · JPL
495759 Jandesselberger	2017 BS_{63}	Jandesselberger	February 10, 2013	Tincana	Kusiak, M., Zolnowski, M.	·	2.2 km	MPC · JPL
495760	2017 CL_{12}	—	February 17, 2010	Kitt Peak	Spacewatch	·	1.0 km	MPC · JPL
495761	2017 CT_{12}	—	November 30, 2008	Mount Lemmon	Mount Lemmon Survey	·	1.1 km	MPC · JPL
495762	2017 DQ_{49}	—	December 7, 2012	Haleakala	Pan-STARRS 1	PHO	870 m	MPC · JPL
495763	2017 DZ_{70}	—	February 24, 2006	Kitt Peak	Spacewatch	·	1.0 km	MPC · JPL
495764	2017 DN_{91}	—	January 17, 2007	Catalina	CSS	·	2.9 km	MPC · JPL
495765	2017 DY_{115}	—	June 7, 2013	Haleakala	Pan-STARRS 1	·	1.6 km	MPC · JPL
495766	2017 EB_{5}	—	April 27, 2000	Socorro	LINEAR	(1547)	1.5 km	MPC · JPL
495767	2017 ET_{5}	—	February 12, 2002	Socorro	LINEAR	·	1.3 km	MPC · JPL
495768	2017 EB_{6}	—	March 14, 2007	Mount Lemmon	Mount Lemmon Survey	·	2.7 km	MPC · JPL
495769	2017 EE_{6}	—	January 16, 2010	WISE	WISE	·	3.0 km	MPC · JPL
495770	2017 EF_{6}	—	November 4, 2004	Kitt Peak	Spacewatch	·	1.4 km	MPC · JPL
495771	2017 EH_{6}	—	October 21, 2003	Kitt Peak	Spacewatch	VER	3.6 km	MPC · JPL
495772	2017 EM_{7}	—	January 27, 2006	Kitt Peak	Spacewatch	·	2.2 km	MPC · JPL
495773	2017 EN_{7}	—	May 21, 2005	Mount Lemmon	Mount Lemmon Survey	·	1.4 km	MPC · JPL
495774	2017 EP_{15}	—	February 24, 2006	Mount Lemmon	Mount Lemmon Survey	TIR	3.1 km	MPC · JPL
495775	2017 EQ_{20}	—	June 17, 2007	Kitt Peak	Spacewatch	·	3.8 km	MPC · JPL
495776	2017 EQ_{21}	—	March 14, 2004	Kitt Peak	Spacewatch	·	1.7 km	MPC · JPL
495777	2017 ES_{21}	—	October 26, 2008	Mount Lemmon	Mount Lemmon Survey	·	3.8 km	MPC · JPL
495778	2017 FK_{4}	—	February 27, 2006	Catalina	CSS	EUP	3.2 km	MPC · JPL
495779	2017 FW_{6}	—	April 5, 2000	Socorro	LINEAR	·	870 m	MPC · JPL
495780	2017 FA_{9}	—	September 26, 2008	Kitt Peak	Spacewatch	·	910 m	MPC · JPL
495781	2017 FG_{10}	—	December 5, 2007	Kitt Peak	Spacewatch	EUN	1.1 km	MPC · JPL
495782	2017 FX_{22}	—	February 6, 2007	Mount Lemmon	Mount Lemmon Survey	·	1.5 km	MPC · JPL
495783	2017 FK_{40}	—	December 8, 2005	Kitt Peak	Spacewatch	·	1.6 km	MPC · JPL
495784	2017 FT_{42}	—	December 29, 2011	Mount Lemmon	Mount Lemmon Survey	·	1.7 km	MPC · JPL
495785	2017 FK_{43}	—	May 14, 2004	Kitt Peak	Spacewatch	·	2.2 km	MPC · JPL
495786	2017 FV_{43}	—	April 18, 2007	Mount Lemmon	Mount Lemmon Survey	·	2.6 km	MPC · JPL
495787	2017 FN_{44}	—	January 13, 2008	Kitt Peak	Spacewatch	·	1.4 km	MPC · JPL
495788	2017 FM_{48}	—	June 28, 2014	Kitt Peak	Spacewatch	·	1.1 km	MPC · JPL
495789	2017 FM_{51}	—	October 14, 2009	Mount Lemmon	Mount Lemmon Survey	LIX	3.5 km	MPC · JPL
495790	2017 FB_{52}	—	November 30, 2011	Mount Lemmon	Mount Lemmon Survey	·	1.1 km	MPC · JPL
495791	2017 FG_{52}	—	April 16, 2013	Haleakala	Pan-STARRS 1	·	1.8 km	MPC · JPL
495792	2017 FJ_{55}	—	November 19, 2009	Kitt Peak	Spacewatch	·	4.0 km	MPC · JPL
495793	2017 FR_{65}	—	May 12, 2007	Kitt Peak	Spacewatch	·	3.9 km	MPC · JPL
495794	2017 FT_{66}	—	October 16, 2009	Mount Lemmon	Mount Lemmon Survey	EOS	2.2 km	MPC · JPL
495795	2017 FL_{71}	—	November 29, 1997	Kitt Peak	Spacewatch	·	2.6 km	MPC · JPL
495796	2017 FG_{76}	—	March 19, 2004	Socorro	LINEAR	·	1.7 km	MPC · JPL
495797	2017 FG_{80}	—	January 7, 2006	Kitt Peak	Spacewatch	·	3.6 km	MPC · JPL
495798	2017 FR_{82}	—	May 20, 2006	Siding Spring	SSS	·	930 m	MPC · JPL
495799	2017 FB_{83}	—	March 6, 2013	Haleakala	Pan-STARRS 1	·	1.2 km	MPC · JPL
495800	2017 FR_{83}	—	April 11, 2013	Mount Lemmon	Mount Lemmon Survey	·	1.3 km	MPC · JPL

== 495801–495900 ==
back to top

Designation			Discovery			Properties		Ref
Permanent	Provisional	Named after	Date	Site	Discoverer(s)	Category	Diam.	Ref
495801	2017 FM_{89}	—	October 26, 2009	Mount Lemmon	Mount Lemmon Survey	·	3.7 km	MPC · JPL
495802	2017 FP_{89}	—	April 10, 2013	Mount Lemmon	Mount Lemmon Survey	·	1.4 km	MPC · JPL
495803	2017 FR_{89}	—	February 9, 2010	Mount Lemmon	Mount Lemmon Survey	·	650 m	MPC · JPL
495804	2017 FF_{91}	—	October 21, 2003	Palomar	NEAT	H	400 m	MPC · JPL
495805	2017 FJ_{95}	—	November 18, 2007	Mount Lemmon	Mount Lemmon Survey	·	1.1 km	MPC · JPL
495806	2017 FN_{95}	—	April 9, 2010	Mount Lemmon	Mount Lemmon Survey	PHO	930 m	MPC · JPL
495807	2017 FA_{97}	—	August 26, 2009	Catalina	CSS	·	1.4 km	MPC · JPL
495808	2017 FJ_{97}	—	April 4, 2003	Kitt Peak	Spacewatch	·	880 m	MPC · JPL
495809	2017 FQ_{97}	—	February 20, 2012	Haleakala	Pan-STARRS 1	BRA	1.7 km	MPC · JPL
495810	2017 FP_{98}	—	November 17, 2009	Mount Lemmon	Mount Lemmon Survey	·	3.1 km	MPC · JPL
495811	2017 FF_{102}	—	April 14, 2004	Kitt Peak	Spacewatch	H	470 m	MPC · JPL
495812	2017 FC_{103}	—	April 16, 2013	Haleakala	Pan-STARRS 1	·	1.4 km	MPC · JPL
495813	2017 FM_{103}	—	February 6, 2013	Kitt Peak	Spacewatch	·	1.0 km	MPC · JPL
495814	2017 FZ_{107}	—	October 23, 2009	Kitt Peak	Spacewatch	·	2.9 km	MPC · JPL
495815	2017 FL_{108}	—	March 17, 2004	Kitt Peak	Spacewatch	·	770 m	MPC · JPL
495816	2017 FU_{108}	—	August 7, 2010	WISE	WISE	·	2.3 km	MPC · JPL
495817	2017 FB_{109}	—	November 21, 2014	Haleakala	Pan-STARRS 1	·	3.2 km	MPC · JPL
495818	2017 FZ_{111}	—	June 8, 2008	Kitt Peak	Spacewatch	·	2.5 km	MPC · JPL
495819	2017 FN_{112}	—	April 21, 2006	Catalina	CSS	·	1.4 km	MPC · JPL
495820	2017 FQ_{120}	—	September 2, 2010	Mount Lemmon	Mount Lemmon Survey	·	1.6 km	MPC · JPL
495821	2017 FB_{121}	—	December 14, 1998	Kitt Peak	Spacewatch	·	2.8 km	MPC · JPL
495822	2017 FD_{121}	—	September 22, 2009	Mount Lemmon	Mount Lemmon Survey	·	3.1 km	MPC · JPL
495823	2017 FM_{121}	—	October 20, 2003	Kitt Peak	Spacewatch	·	3.7 km	MPC · JPL
495824	2017 FF_{122}	—	December 3, 2010	Kitt Peak	Spacewatch	·	2.6 km	MPC · JPL
495825	2017 FG_{123}	—	September 22, 2003	Kitt Peak	Spacewatch	EOS	1.9 km	MPC · JPL
495826	2017 FV_{155}	—	October 22, 2012	Mount Lemmon	Mount Lemmon Survey	·	650 m	MPC · JPL
495827	2017 HP_{12}	—	November 4, 2004	Kitt Peak	Spacewatch	ERI	2.2 km	MPC · JPL
495828	1981 EX_{11}	—	March 7, 1981	Siding Spring	S. J. Bus	·	2.2 km	MPC · JPL
495829	1995 LG	—	June 6, 1995	Kitt Peak	Spacewatch	APO	630 m	MPC · JPL
495830	1999 TB_{183}	—	October 9, 1999	Socorro	LINEAR	·	1.1 km	MPC · JPL
495831	2000 AW_{93}	—	January 5, 2000	Socorro	LINEAR	·	480 m	MPC · JPL
495832	2000 JV_{60}	—	May 7, 2000	Socorro	LINEAR	T_{j} (2.97) · 2:1J (unstable)	1.4 km	MPC · JPL
495833	2000 SB_{8}	—	September 20, 2000	Socorro	LINEAR	AMO	500 m	MPC · JPL
495834	2000 SN_{51}	—	September 23, 2000	Socorro	LINEAR	·	1.8 km	MPC · JPL
495835	2000 SH_{347}	—	September 25, 2000	Socorro	LINEAR	T_{j} (2.95)	3.3 km	MPC · JPL
495836	2001 RA_{51}	—	September 11, 2001	Socorro	LINEAR	·	2.4 km	MPC · JPL
495837	2001 SB_{349}	—	September 21, 2001	Socorro	LINEAR	BRG	1.6 km	MPC · JPL
495838	2001 VH_{96}	—	November 15, 2001	Socorro	LINEAR	·	2.5 km	MPC · JPL
495839	2001 VK_{114}	—	November 12, 2001	Socorro	LINEAR	·	1.8 km	MPC · JPL
495840	2001 WE_{27}	—	November 17, 2001	Socorro	LINEAR	·	1.2 km	MPC · JPL
495841	2001 XD_{15}	—	November 18, 2001	Socorro	LINEAR	(194)	1.8 km	MPC · JPL
495842	2001 XE_{105}	—	December 14, 2001	Kingsnake	J. V. McClusky	·	3.6 km	MPC · JPL
495843	2001 XV_{124}	—	November 19, 2001	Anderson Mesa	LONEOS	·	1.7 km	MPC · JPL
495844	2002 AD_{183}	—	January 5, 2002	Kitt Peak	Spacewatch	·	1.6 km	MPC · JPL
495845	2002 PP_{123}	—	August 15, 2002	Vicques	M. Ory	·	1.1 km	MPC · JPL
495846	2002 PW_{138}	—	August 11, 2002	Palomar	NEAT	·	1.0 km	MPC · JPL
495847	2002 PA_{180}	—	August 8, 2002	Palomar	NEAT	·	900 m	MPC · JPL
495848	2002 QD_{7}	—	August 20, 2002	Socorro	LINEAR	APO +1km	880 m	MPC · JPL
495849	2002 QP_{61}	—	August 16, 2002	Palomar	NEAT	·	2.5 km	MPC · JPL
495850	2002 RK_{223}	—	September 13, 2002	Kitt Peak	Spacewatch	3:2 · SHU	3.3 km	MPC · JPL
495851	2002 TL_{68}	—	October 9, 2002	Socorro	LINEAR	·	1.3 km	MPC · JPL
495852	2002 TF_{166}	—	October 3, 2002	Palomar	NEAT	·	1.0 km	MPC · JPL
495853	2002 TC_{303}	—	October 11, 2002	Socorro	LINEAR	·	2.4 km	MPC · JPL
495854	2003 HA_{3}	—	April 24, 2003	Kitt Peak	Spacewatch	·	2.0 km	MPC · JPL
495855	2003 KK_{8}	—	May 23, 2003	Kitt Peak	Spacewatch	·	2.1 km	MPC · JPL
495856	2003 KM_{11}	—	May 27, 2003	Nogales	M. Schwartz, P. R. Holvorcem	·	370 m	MPC · JPL
495857	2003 MT	—	June 23, 2003	Kitt Peak	Spacewatch	T_{j} (2.96) · AMO	530 m	MPC · JPL
495858	2003 MJ_{4}	—	June 27, 2003	Socorro	LINEAR	AMO · APO	340 m	MPC · JPL
495859	2003 SA_{181}	—	September 20, 2003	Socorro	LINEAR	T_{j} (2.98) · 3:2	5.1 km	MPC · JPL
495860	2003 SW_{187}	—	September 17, 2003	Anderson Mesa	LONEOS	·	2.5 km	MPC · JPL
495861	2003 UR_{65}	—	October 16, 2003	Palomar	NEAT	·	840 m	MPC · JPL
495862	2003 WV_{130}	—	November 21, 2003	Palomar	NEAT	·	2.1 km	MPC · JPL
495863	2003 XV_{4}	—	December 1, 2003	Kitt Peak	Spacewatch	·	1.0 km	MPC · JPL
495864	2004 CU_{7}	—	February 10, 2004	Catalina	CSS	·	1.1 km	MPC · JPL
495865	2004 JC_{54}	—	April 14, 2004	Kitt Peak	Spacewatch	·	1.3 km	MPC · JPL
495866	2004 MU_{2}	—	June 16, 2004	Socorro	LINEAR	·	2.3 km	MPC · JPL
495867	2004 NZ_{15}	—	July 11, 2004	Socorro	LINEAR	·	1.4 km	MPC · JPL
495868	2004 PE_{44}	—	August 7, 2004	Palomar	NEAT	·	700 m	MPC · JPL
495869	2004 PW_{89}	—	August 10, 2004	Socorro	LINEAR	·	1.6 km	MPC · JPL
495870	2004 RB_{45}	—	August 10, 2004	Campo Imperatore	CINEOS	·	1.3 km	MPC · JPL
495871	2004 RP_{52}	—	September 8, 2004	Socorro	LINEAR	·	510 m	MPC · JPL
495872	2004 RX_{90}	—	August 22, 2004	Kitt Peak	Spacewatch	·	1.3 km	MPC · JPL
495873	2004 RA_{91}	—	September 8, 2004	Socorro	LINEAR	·	1.8 km	MPC · JPL
495874	2004 RU_{94}	—	September 8, 2004	Socorro	LINEAR	·	2.1 km	MPC · JPL
495875	2004 RT_{105}	—	September 8, 2004	Palomar	NEAT	·	1.4 km	MPC · JPL
495876	2004 RP_{112}	—	September 6, 2004	Socorro	LINEAR	PHO	840 m	MPC · JPL
495877	2004 RP_{124}	—	August 25, 2004	Kitt Peak	Spacewatch	·	1.5 km	MPC · JPL
495878	2004 RQ_{171}	—	September 9, 2004	Socorro	LINEAR	·	570 m	MPC · JPL
495879	2004 RG_{177}	—	September 10, 2004	Socorro	LINEAR	·	810 m	MPC · JPL
495880	2004 RS_{188}	—	August 12, 2004	Socorro	LINEAR	·	1.8 km	MPC · JPL
495881	2004 RT_{217}	—	September 11, 2004	Socorro	LINEAR	JUN	960 m	MPC · JPL
495882	2004 RX_{219}	—	September 11, 2004	Socorro	LINEAR	·	1.4 km	MPC · JPL
495883	2004 RN_{221}	—	September 12, 2004	Socorro	LINEAR	·	1.7 km	MPC · JPL
495884	2004 RU_{336}	—	September 15, 2004	Kitt Peak	Spacewatch	·	600 m	MPC · JPL
495885	2004 SE_{57}	—	September 16, 2004	Anderson Mesa	LONEOS	JUN	920 m	MPC · JPL
495886	2004 TB_{7}	—	August 27, 2004	Anderson Mesa	LONEOS	·	1.4 km	MPC · JPL
495887	2004 TA_{51}	—	October 4, 2004	Kitt Peak	Spacewatch	·	1.4 km	MPC · JPL
495888	2004 TK_{137}	—	October 8, 2004	Anderson Mesa	LONEOS	·	1.7 km	MPC · JPL
495889	2004 TJ_{183}	—	September 10, 2004	Kitt Peak	Spacewatch	·	1.5 km	MPC · JPL
495890	2004 TM_{276}	—	October 9, 2004	Kitt Peak	Spacewatch	·	1.9 km	MPC · JPL
495891	2004 VS_{60}	—	November 10, 2004	Socorro	LINEAR	AMO	750 m	MPC · JPL
495892	2004 WA_{5}	—	November 3, 2004	Anderson Mesa	LONEOS	·	750 m	MPC · JPL
495893	2004 XT_{9}	—	December 2, 2004	Catalina	CSS	·	670 m	MPC · JPL
495894	2004 XU_{93}	—	December 11, 2004	Kitt Peak	Spacewatch	PHO	1.3 km	MPC · JPL
495895	2005 GQ_{101}	—	April 9, 2005	Kitt Peak	Spacewatch	·	2.7 km	MPC · JPL
495896	2005 LJ_{36}	—	June 13, 2005	Mount Lemmon	Mount Lemmon Survey	·	1.2 km	MPC · JPL
495897	2005 MG_{44}	—	June 27, 2005	Palomar	NEAT	T_{j} (2.96)	4.9 km	MPC · JPL
495898	2005 NQ_{21}	—	July 1, 2005	Kitt Peak	Spacewatch	·	1.2 km	MPC · JPL
495899	2005 NO_{45}	—	June 17, 2005	Mount Lemmon	Mount Lemmon Survey	·	1 km	MPC · JPL
495900	2005 QW_{27}	—	August 27, 2005	Kitt Peak	Spacewatch	·	1.6 km	MPC · JPL

== 495901–496000 ==
back to top

Designation			Discovery			Properties		Ref
Permanent	Provisional	Named after	Date	Site	Discoverer(s)	Category	Diam.	Ref
495901	2005 QO_{99}	—	August 27, 2005	Palomar	NEAT	·	560 m	MPC · JPL
495902	2005 QD_{108}	—	August 27, 2005	Palomar	NEAT	·	910 m	MPC · JPL
495903	2005 QO_{133}	—	August 28, 2005	Kitt Peak	Spacewatch	·	950 m	MPC · JPL
495904	2005 RX_{25}	—	September 12, 2005	7300	7300	·	1.3 km	MPC · JPL
495905	2005 SU_{87}	—	September 24, 2005	Kitt Peak	Spacewatch	·	1.2 km	MPC · JPL
495906	2005 SG_{154}	—	September 26, 2005	Kitt Peak	Spacewatch	·	1.2 km	MPC · JPL
495907	2005 SU_{191}	—	September 29, 2005	Mount Lemmon	Mount Lemmon Survey	·	1.5 km	MPC · JPL
495908	2005 SP_{256}	—	September 22, 2005	Palomar	NEAT	critical	780 m	MPC · JPL
495909	2005 SV_{292}	—	September 26, 2005	Kitt Peak	Spacewatch	H	430 m	MPC · JPL
495910	2005 TA_{118}	—	October 7, 2005	Kitt Peak	Spacewatch	·	970 m	MPC · JPL
495911	2005 UG_{183}	—	October 25, 2005	Kitt Peak	Spacewatch	·	1.0 km	MPC · JPL
495912	2005 UY_{201}	—	October 25, 2005	Kitt Peak	Spacewatch	·	1.1 km	MPC · JPL
495913	2005 UF_{218}	—	October 25, 2005	Kitt Peak	Spacewatch	·	1.6 km	MPC · JPL
495914	2005 UE_{224}	—	October 25, 2005	Kitt Peak	Spacewatch	·	1.1 km	MPC · JPL
495915	2005 UW_{225}	—	October 25, 2005	Kitt Peak	Spacewatch	·	1.7 km	MPC · JPL
495916	2005 UO_{286}	—	October 26, 2005	Kitt Peak	Spacewatch	·	1.9 km	MPC · JPL
495917	2005 UT_{390}	—	October 29, 2005	Mount Lemmon	Mount Lemmon Survey	EUN	1.3 km	MPC · JPL
495918	2005 UY_{484}	—	October 22, 2005	Catalina	CSS	ADE	1.8 km	MPC · JPL
495919	2005 UD_{529}	—	October 24, 2005	Kitt Peak	Spacewatch	WIT	740 m	MPC · JPL
495920	2005 VX_{15}	—	November 2, 2005	Catalina	CSS	(1547)	1.2 km	MPC · JPL
495921	2005 VV_{73}	—	November 6, 2005	Kitt Peak	Spacewatch	NYS	860 m	MPC · JPL
495922	2005 VN_{111}	—	November 6, 2005	Mount Lemmon	Mount Lemmon Survey	·	1.6 km	MPC · JPL
495923	2005 WM_{145}	—	November 25, 2005	Kitt Peak	Spacewatch	·	520 m	MPC · JPL
495924	2005 WQ_{185}	—	November 30, 2005	Socorro	LINEAR	·	2.2 km	MPC · JPL
495925	2005 YV_{69}	—	December 26, 2005	Kitt Peak	Spacewatch	·	2.0 km	MPC · JPL
495926	2005 YD_{88}	—	December 25, 2005	Mount Lemmon	Mount Lemmon Survey	MRX	820 m	MPC · JPL
495927	2005 YF_{146}	—	December 3, 2000	Kitt Peak	Spacewatch	·	1.9 km	MPC · JPL
495928	2005 YM_{178}	—	December 24, 2005	Kitt Peak	Spacewatch	·	2.6 km	MPC · JPL
495929	2005 YB_{255}	—	December 30, 2005	Kitt Peak	Spacewatch	·	2.1 km	MPC · JPL
495930	2006 AR_{2}	—	January 5, 2006	Socorro	LINEAR	APO	380 m	MPC · JPL
495931	2006 DV_{173}	—	February 27, 2006	Kitt Peak	Spacewatch	·	1.4 km	MPC · JPL
495932	2006 DD_{179}	—	January 8, 2006	Mount Lemmon	Mount Lemmon Survey	·	1.0 km	MPC · JPL
495933	2006 HQ_{66}	—	April 2, 2006	Kitt Peak	Spacewatch	·	710 m	MPC · JPL
495934	2006 HR_{82}	—	April 26, 2006	Kitt Peak	Spacewatch	·	760 m	MPC · JPL
495935	2006 JQ_{11}	—	May 1, 2006	Kitt Peak	Spacewatch	·	2.4 km	MPC · JPL
495936	2006 KT_{74}	—	May 9, 2006	Mount Lemmon	Mount Lemmon Survey	EOS	1.7 km	MPC · JPL
495937	2006 KB_{102}	—	May 27, 2006	Kitt Peak	Spacewatch	·	3.0 km	MPC · JPL
495938	2006 QW_{82}	—	August 27, 2006	Kitt Peak	Spacewatch	·	1.2 km	MPC · JPL
495939	2006 QH_{90}	—	May 8, 2006	Mount Lemmon	Mount Lemmon Survey	·	3.2 km	MPC · JPL
495940	2006 QH_{186}	—	August 18, 2006	Kitt Peak	Spacewatch	NYS	870 m	MPC · JPL
495941	2006 RQ_{3}	—	September 11, 2006	Catalina	CSS	·	1.1 km	MPC · JPL
495942	2006 RN_{70}	—	September 15, 2006	Kitt Peak	Spacewatch	·	530 m	MPC · JPL
495943	2006 RE_{96}	—	September 15, 2006	Kitt Peak	Spacewatch	NYS	1.0 km	MPC · JPL
495944	2006 SX_{140}	—	September 24, 2006	Anderson Mesa	LONEOS	·	560 m	MPC · JPL
495945	2006 SZ_{354}	—	July 21, 2006	Mount Lemmon	Mount Lemmon Survey	·	810 m	MPC · JPL
495946	2006 SQ_{407}	—	September 19, 2006	Catalina	CSS	THB	2.3 km	MPC · JPL
495947	2006 UD_{38}	—	October 16, 2006	Kitt Peak	Spacewatch	ADE	1.7 km	MPC · JPL
495948	2006 UM_{151}	—	October 4, 2006	Mount Lemmon	Mount Lemmon Survey	·	830 m	MPC · JPL
495949	2006 UP_{284}	—	October 17, 2006	Mount Lemmon	Mount Lemmon Survey	·	1.0 km	MPC · JPL
495950	2006 UV_{334}	—	October 20, 2006	Mount Lemmon	Mount Lemmon Survey	·	1.2 km	MPC · JPL
495951	2006 VJ_{115}	—	September 28, 2006	Catalina	CSS	·	3.1 km	MPC · JPL
495952	2006 WZ_{13}	—	November 16, 2006	Mount Lemmon	Mount Lemmon Survey	·	1.0 km	MPC · JPL
495953	2006 WP_{105}	—	November 19, 2006	Kitt Peak	Spacewatch	·	960 m	MPC · JPL
495954	2007 BZ_{72}	—	December 21, 2006	Catalina	CSS	·	1.5 km	MPC · JPL
495955	2007 BY_{101}	—	January 25, 2007	Catalina	CSS	·	2.6 km	MPC · JPL
495956	2007 DF_{22}	—	February 17, 2007	Kitt Peak	Spacewatch	·	2.2 km	MPC · JPL
495957	2007 EW_{91}	—	March 10, 2007	Kitt Peak	Spacewatch	·	2.1 km	MPC · JPL
495958	2007 LV_{12}	—	June 9, 2007	Kitt Peak	Spacewatch	BRA	1.3 km	MPC · JPL
495959	2007 ML_{6}	—	June 21, 2007	Socorro	LINEAR	AMO	650 m	MPC · JPL
495960	2007 MT_{20}	—	June 24, 2007	Socorro	LINEAR	APO	610 m	MPC · JPL
495961	2007 PB_{47}	—	August 9, 2007	Kitt Peak	Spacewatch	·	720 m	MPC · JPL
495962	2007 RS_{6}	—	September 4, 2007	La Sagra	OAM	·	830 m	MPC · JPL
495963	2007 RX_{43}	—	September 9, 2007	Kitt Peak	Spacewatch	V	410 m	MPC · JPL
495964	2007 RT_{44}	—	September 9, 2007	Kitt Peak	Spacewatch	·	520 m	MPC · JPL
495965	2007 RW_{132}	—	September 13, 2007	Altschwendt	W. Ries	VER	2.3 km	MPC · JPL
495966	2007 RC_{143}	—	September 14, 2007	Socorro	LINEAR	·	530 m	MPC · JPL
495967	2007 RH_{213}	—	August 23, 2007	Kitt Peak	Spacewatch	MAS	590 m	MPC · JPL
495968	2007 RP_{234}	—	September 12, 2007	Mount Lemmon	Mount Lemmon Survey	·	600 m	MPC · JPL
495969	2007 RB_{273}	—	September 15, 2007	Kitt Peak	Spacewatch	HYG	2.3 km	MPC · JPL
495970	2007 RY_{284}	—	September 12, 2007	Mount Lemmon	Mount Lemmon Survey	·	2.2 km	MPC · JPL
495971	2007 TK_{9}	—	September 14, 2007	Anderson Mesa	LONEOS	·	800 m	MPC · JPL
495972	2007 TY_{11}	—	October 6, 2007	Socorro	LINEAR	·	2.2 km	MPC · JPL
495973	2007 TC_{13}	—	October 6, 2007	Socorro	LINEAR	·	560 m	MPC · JPL
495974	2007 TH_{40}	—	September 9, 2007	Mount Lemmon	Mount Lemmon Survey	·	2.2 km	MPC · JPL
495975	2007 TH_{60}	—	October 5, 2007	Kitt Peak	Spacewatch	·	2.6 km	MPC · JPL
495976	2007 TE_{65}	—	October 7, 2007	Mount Lemmon	Mount Lemmon Survey	·	1.1 km	MPC · JPL
495977	2007 TJ_{105}	—	September 13, 2007	Catalina	CSS	·	3.4 km	MPC · JPL
495978	2007 TG_{127}	—	October 6, 2007	Kitt Peak	Spacewatch	·	610 m	MPC · JPL
495979	2007 TM_{145}	—	October 4, 2007	Kitt Peak	Spacewatch	·	640 m	MPC · JPL
495980	2007 TW_{270}	—	October 9, 2007	Kitt Peak	Spacewatch	·	710 m	MPC · JPL
495981	2007 TQ_{278}	—	October 11, 2007	Mount Lemmon	Mount Lemmon Survey	·	2.6 km	MPC · JPL
495982	2007 TS_{332}	—	October 11, 2007	Kitt Peak	Spacewatch	·	2.8 km	MPC · JPL
495983	2007 TD_{334}	—	October 11, 2007	Kitt Peak	Spacewatch	·	630 m	MPC · JPL
495984	2007 TW_{398}	—	October 15, 2007	Kitt Peak	Spacewatch	EOS	1.6 km	MPC · JPL
495985	2007 TF_{399}	—	October 15, 2007	Kitt Peak	Spacewatch	·	3.4 km	MPC · JPL
495986	2007 TN_{408}	—	September 14, 2007	Mount Lemmon	Mount Lemmon Survey	NYS	900 m	MPC · JPL
495987	2007 TP_{426}	—	October 9, 2007	Kitt Peak	Spacewatch	·	640 m	MPC · JPL
495988	2007 TX_{432}	—	October 8, 2007	Kitt Peak	Spacewatch	·	1.3 km	MPC · JPL
495989	2007 TJ_{450}	—	October 11, 2007	Kitt Peak	Spacewatch	·	950 m	MPC · JPL
495990	2007 UY_{4}	—	October 7, 2007	Catalina	CSS	·	680 m	MPC · JPL
495991	2007 UY_{7}	—	October 16, 2007	Catalina	CSS	·	950 m	MPC · JPL
495992	2007 US_{98}	—	September 9, 2007	Mount Lemmon	Mount Lemmon Survey	NYS	820 m	MPC · JPL
495993	2007 UD_{102}	—	October 16, 2007	Mount Lemmon	Mount Lemmon Survey	(895)	3.7 km	MPC · JPL
495994	2007 UG_{115}	—	October 10, 2007	Mount Lemmon	Mount Lemmon Survey	(5)	880 m	MPC · JPL
495995	2007 VK_{4}	—	October 16, 2007	Catalina	CSS	·	3.2 km	MPC · JPL
495996	2007 VP_{58}	—	November 1, 2007	Kitt Peak	Spacewatch	H	690 m	MPC · JPL
495997	2007 VH_{96}	—	November 4, 2007	Catalina	CSS	·	1.9 km	MPC · JPL
495998	2007 VU_{113}	—	November 3, 2007	Kitt Peak	Spacewatch	·	2.2 km	MPC · JPL
495999	2007 VM_{152}	—	October 19, 2007	Anderson Mesa	LONEOS	·	3.0 km	MPC · JPL
496000	2007 VZ_{156}	—	September 10, 2007	Mount Lemmon	Mount Lemmon Survey	(5)	960 m	MPC · JPL

back to top

== Meaning of names ==
As minor planet discoveries are confirmed, they are given a permanent number by the IAU's Minor Planet Center (MPC), and the discoverers can then submit names for them, following the IAU's naming conventions. The list below concerns those minor planets in the specified number-range that have received names, and explains the meanings of those names.

Official naming citations of newly named small Solar System bodies are approved and published in a bulletin by IAU's Working Group for Small Bodies Nomenclature (WGSBN). Before May 2021, citations were published in MPC's Minor Planet Circulars for many decades. Recent citations can also be found on the JPL Small-Body Database (SBDB). Until his death in 2016, German astronomer Lutz D. Schmadel compiled these citations into the Dictionary of Minor Planet Names (DMP) and regularly updated the collection.

Based on Paul Herget's The Names of the Minor Planets, Schmadel also researched the unclear origin of numerous asteroids, most of which had been named prior to World War II. This article incorporates text from this source, which is in the public domain: SBDB New namings may only be added to this list below after official publication as the preannouncement of names is condemned. The WGSBN publishes a comprehensive guideline for the naming rules of non-cometary small Solar System bodies.

Named minor planet	Provisional	This minor planet was named for...	Ref · Catalog
495181 Rogerwaters	2012 PV_{19}	Roger Waters (born 1943) is an English musician, one of the founders of Pink Floyd.	JPL · 495181
495253 Hanszimmer	2013 OC_{8}	Hans Zimmer (born 1957) is a German film score composer and record producer. He has received four Grammy Awards, three Classical BRIT Awards, two Golden Globes, and an Academy Award for The Lion King (1995). His works include also music for Gladiator, Inception, Interstellar, and nearly 150 other productions.	JPL · 495253
495287 Harari	2013 RW_{94}	Yuval Noah Harari (born 1976) is an Israeli historian and a tenured professor in the Department of History at the Hebrew University of Jerusalem. His international writing bestsellers focus on the study of free will, human consciousness and intelligence. He is also a proponent of animal rights.	JPL · 495287
495759 Jandesselberger	2017 BS_{63}	Jan Desselberger (born 1945) is a Polish astronomy popularizer. He is the author of astronomical broadcasts on Radio Poland Katowice for over 25 years and is the co-author of the Polish Astronomical Calendar	JPL · 495759
