= Fiorella =

Fiorella is an Italian female given name. Notable people with the given name include:

- Fiorella Aíta (born 1977), Peruvian volleyball player
- Fiorella Betti (1927–2001), Italian actress
- Fiorella Bonicelli (born 1951), Uruguayan tennis player
- Fiorella Cava (born 1960), Peruvian singer, musician and transgender activist
- Fiorella Chiappe (born 1996), Argentine hurdler
- Fiorella Cueva (born 1998), Peruvian weightlifter
- Fiorella D'Croz (born 1979), Colombian triathlete
- Fiorella Faltoyano (born 1949), Spanish actress
- Fiorella Ghilardotti (1946–2005), Italian politician and trade unionist
- Fiorella Infascelli (born 1952), Italian film director and screenwriter
- Fiorella Kostoris (born 1945), Italian economist
- Fiorella Mancini (1943–2021), Italian performance artist and designer
- Fiorella Mannoia (born 1954), Italian singer
- Fiorella Mari (1928–1983), Brazilian-Italian actress
- Fiorella Mattheis (born 1988), Brazilian actress, model, television presenter and entrepreneur
- Fiorella Migliore (born 1989), Paraguayan model, beauty queen, actress and television presenter
- Fiorella Molinelli (born 1974), Peruvian politician
- Fiorella Negro (1938-2019), Italian competitive figure skater
- Fiorella Olivera (born 1989), Peruvian chemist and science communicator
- Fiorella Pacheco (born 1985), Peruvian footballer
- Fiorella Terenzi, Italian astrophysicist and author
- Fiorella Salazar Rojas (born 1976), Costa Rican politician
- Fiorella Valverde (born 1989), Peruvian footballer
- Fiorella Viñas (born c. 1984), Peruvian beauty queen

== See also ==
- Fiorella (opera), a 1826 opera by composer Daniel-François-Esprit Auber and librettist Eugène Scribe
- Pascal Antoine Fiorella (1752–1818), French-Italian general
- 483951 Fiorella, a main-belt asteroid
- Fiorello
- Fiorelli
