= Fiorello =

Fiorello may refer to:

== People ==
=== Given name ===
- Fiorello Giraud (1870–1928), Italian operatic tenor
- Fiorello Gramillano (born 1946), Italian politician
- Fiorello La Guardia (1882–1947), American attorney and politician, mayor of New York City

=== Surname ===
- Giuseppe Fiorello (born 1969), Italian actor
- Kimberly Fiorello (born 1975), American politician
- Rosario Fiorello (born 1960), Italian comedian, singer and TV host
- Vinnie Fiorello (born 1974), American drummer and lyricist, founding member of ska punk band Less Than Jake

== Other ==
- Fiorello!, a 1959 Broadway musical
  - Fiorello! (album), a 1960 album by Oscar Peterson with music from the musical
- Fiorello I and Fiorello II, thoroughbred showjumpers ridden by Raimondo D'Inzeo

== See also ==
- Fiorella
- Fiorelli
