= Fiorelli (surname) =

Fiorelli is an Italian surname derived from the given name Fiorello. People with that name include:

- Aldo Fiorelli (1915–1983), Italian actor
- Filippo Fiorelli (born 1994), Italian cyclist
- Francesco Fiorelli (17th century), Italian painter
- Giuseppe Fiorelli (1823–1896), Italian archaeologist
- Ugo Fiorelli (1893–1941), Italian naval officer, recipient of the Gold Medal of Military Valor
  - Italian destroyer Comandante Fiorelli, named in his honour

== See also ==
- Fiorelli, a fashion brand
- Filotex-Fiorelli, an Italian former professional cycling team
- Fiorella, an Italian female given name
- Fiorello, an Italian male given name
- Fiorilli, an Italian surname
