= Fiorilli =

Fiorilli is an Italian surname. Notable people with the surname include:

- Agustín Fiorilli (born 1978), Argentine freestyle swimmer
- Tiberio Fiorilli (1608–1694), also spelled Fiorillo and Fiurelli, Italian actor of commedia dell'arte

== See also ==
- Fiorelli
