= List of minor planets: 483001–484000 =

The following is a partial list of minor planets, running from minor-planet number 483001 through 484000, inclusive. The primary data for this and other partial lists is based on JPL's "Small-Body Orbital Elements" and data available from the Minor Planet Center. Critical list information is also provided by the MPC, unless otherwise specified from Lowell Observatory. A detailed description of the table's columns and additional sources are given on the main page including a complete list of every page in this series, and a statistical break-up on the dynamical classification of minor planets.

Also see the summary list of all named bodies in numerical and alphabetical order, and the corresponding naming citations for the number range of this particular list. New namings may only be added to this list after official publication, as the preannouncement of names is condemned by the Working Group for Small Bodies Nomenclature of the International Astronomical Union.

Near-Earth obj.	MBA (inner)	MBA (outer)	Centaur
Mars-crosser	MBA (middle)	Jupiter trojan	Trans-Neptunian obj.
Unclassified

== 483001–483100 ==
Designation			Discovery			Properties		Ref
Permanent	Provisional	Named after	Date	Site	Discoverer(s)	Category	Diam.	Ref
483001	2014 QL_{420}	—	March 10, 2007	Kitt Peak	Spacewatch	·	3.1 km	MPC · JPL
483002	2014 QS_{441}	—	August 19, 2014	Cerro Tololo	DECam	cubewano (hot)	388 km	MPC · JPL
483003	2014 RX_{62}	—	January 10, 2006	Mount Lemmon	Mount Lemmon Survey	EOS	2.3 km	MPC · JPL
483004	2014 SB_{15}	—	January 1, 2012	Mount Lemmon	Mount Lemmon Survey	·	1.3 km	MPC · JPL
483005	2014 SP_{140}	—	October 5, 2003	Kitt Peak	Spacewatch	·	5.0 km	MPC · JPL
483006	2014 SS_{210}	—	October 22, 2005	Catalina	CSS	·	1.8 km	MPC · JPL
483007	2014 SE_{317}	—	December 29, 2011	Kitt Peak	Spacewatch	V	730 m	MPC · JPL
483008	2014 SM_{349}	—	May 29, 2009	Mount Lemmon	Mount Lemmon Survey	L5	9.8 km	MPC · JPL
483009	2014 TS_{54}	—	September 25, 2008	Kitt Peak	Spacewatch	·	3.2 km	MPC · JPL
483010	2014 TJ_{55}	—	February 2, 2009	Kitt Peak	Spacewatch	·	700 m	MPC · JPL
483011	2014 UQ	—	November 5, 2010	Mount Lemmon	Mount Lemmon Survey	·	2.8 km	MPC · JPL
483012	2014 UX_{45}	—	September 15, 2009	Kitt Peak	Spacewatch	·	2.4 km	MPC · JPL
483013	2014 UY_{103}	—	December 6, 2005	Kitt Peak	Spacewatch	·	2.3 km	MPC · JPL
483014	2014 UJ_{170}	—	January 23, 2006	Kitt Peak	Spacewatch	L5	10 km	MPC · JPL
483015	2014 UR_{194}	—	October 5, 2005	Catalina	CSS	·	1.9 km	MPC · JPL
483016	2014 UG_{197}	—	April 18, 2007	Mount Lemmon	Mount Lemmon Survey	·	1.9 km	MPC · JPL
483017	2014 UJ_{207}	—	January 28, 2007	Kitt Peak	Spacewatch	·	1.9 km	MPC · JPL
483018	2014 VV_{37}	—	October 12, 2013	Mount Lemmon	Mount Lemmon Survey	L5	7.2 km	MPC · JPL
483019	2014 WB_{116}	—	November 15, 2003	Kitt Peak	Spacewatch	·	1.4 km	MPC · JPL
483020	2014 WL_{120}	—	March 10, 2008	Mount Lemmon	Mount Lemmon Survey	L5	10 km	MPC · JPL
483021	2014 WD_{202}	—	April 7, 2008	Kitt Peak	Spacewatch	L5	8.3 km	MPC · JPL
483022	2014 WZ_{236}	—	October 5, 2014	Mount Lemmon	Mount Lemmon Survey	TEL	1.7 km	MPC · JPL
483023	2014 WK_{321}	—	February 9, 2007	Kitt Peak	Spacewatch	·	1.9 km	MPC · JPL
483024	2014 WB_{367}	—	April 14, 1996	Kitt Peak	Spacewatch	L5	10 km	MPC · JPL
483025	2014 WY_{378}	—	December 19, 2004	Mount Lemmon	Mount Lemmon Survey	L5	10 km	MPC · JPL
483026	2014 WS_{454}	—	January 15, 2005	Kitt Peak	Spacewatch	L5	8.3 km	MPC · JPL
483027	2015 AY_{47}	—	January 26, 2006	Mount Lemmon	Mount Lemmon Survey	L5	10 km	MPC · JPL
483028	2015 AL_{148}	—	September 30, 2009	Mount Lemmon	Mount Lemmon Survey	NEM	2.5 km	MPC · JPL
483029	2015 BE_{324}	—	May 13, 2000	Kitt Peak	Spacewatch	EOS	2.1 km	MPC · JPL
483030	2015 DF_{138}	—	December 29, 2003	Catalina	CSS	H	630 m	MPC · JPL
483031	2015 FC_{44}	—	October 31, 2005	Mount Lemmon	Mount Lemmon Survey	·	1.1 km	MPC · JPL
483032	2015 FZ_{74}	—	June 12, 2007	Kitt Peak	Spacewatch	·	1.1 km	MPC · JPL
483033	2015 FD_{140}	—	September 21, 2009	Mount Lemmon	Mount Lemmon Survey	·	1.0 km	MPC · JPL
483034	2015 FU_{301}	—	March 10, 2011	Kitt Peak	Spacewatch	·	1.1 km	MPC · JPL
483035	2015 FJ_{332}	—	June 7, 2008	Siding Spring	SSS	H	590 m	MPC · JPL
483036	2015 FY_{340}	—	October 6, 2008	Catalina	CSS	H	640 m	MPC · JPL
483037	2015 FE_{341}	—	December 1, 2011	Mount Lemmon	Mount Lemmon Survey	H	460 m	MPC · JPL
483038	2015 HD_{9}	—	February 19, 2007	Catalina	CSS	H	700 m	MPC · JPL
483039	2015 HS_{27}	—	March 13, 2008	Kitt Peak	Spacewatch	·	770 m	MPC · JPL
483040	2015 HS_{35}	—	August 29, 2009	Catalina	CSS	·	810 m	MPC · JPL
483041	2015 HW_{55}	—	June 8, 2005	Kitt Peak	Spacewatch	·	960 m	MPC · JPL
483042	2015 HN_{60}	—	July 30, 1995	Kitt Peak	Spacewatch	·	1.3 km	MPC · JPL
483043	2015 HV_{61}	—	May 5, 2008	Mount Lemmon	Mount Lemmon Survey	·	1.0 km	MPC · JPL
483044	2015 HJ_{91}	—	October 25, 2005	Mount Lemmon	Mount Lemmon Survey	MAS	630 m	MPC · JPL
483045	2015 HY_{150}	—	May 9, 2004	Kitt Peak	Spacewatch	·	980 m	MPC · JPL
483046	2015 JG_{3}	—	May 12, 2007	Kitt Peak	Spacewatch	H	510 m	MPC · JPL
483047	2015 JD_{10}	—	April 30, 2008	Mount Lemmon	Mount Lemmon Survey	V	510 m	MPC · JPL
483048	2015 KD_{12}	—	June 6, 2011	Mount Lemmon	Mount Lemmon Survey	·	1.6 km	MPC · JPL
483049	2015 KX_{20}	—	October 31, 2008	Mount Lemmon	Mount Lemmon Survey	·	1.0 km	MPC · JPL
483050	2015 KP_{21}	—	May 26, 2011	Mount Lemmon	Mount Lemmon Survey	·	1.2 km	MPC · JPL
483051	2015 KH_{29}	—	August 23, 1998	Kitt Peak	Spacewatch	·	750 m	MPC · JPL
483052	2015 KY_{36}	—	May 28, 2008	Mount Lemmon	Mount Lemmon Survey	·	1.1 km	MPC · JPL
483053	2015 KT_{37}	—	November 9, 1996	Kitt Peak	Spacewatch	·	1.0 km	MPC · JPL
483054	2015 KH_{46}	—	November 1, 2008	Mount Lemmon	Mount Lemmon Survey	·	970 m	MPC · JPL
483055	2015 KS_{52}	—	November 28, 2005	Mount Lemmon	Mount Lemmon Survey	·	1.4 km	MPC · JPL
483056	2015 KR_{54}	—	June 3, 2011	Mount Lemmon	Mount Lemmon Survey	MIS	2.1 km	MPC · JPL
483057	2015 KM_{56}	—	December 3, 2012	Mount Lemmon	Mount Lemmon Survey	·	1.4 km	MPC · JPL
483058	2015 KC_{92}	—	November 19, 2006	Catalina	CSS	·	730 m	MPC · JPL
483059	2015 KX_{128}	—	April 4, 2011	Kitt Peak	Spacewatch	·	1.2 km	MPC · JPL
483060	2015 KT_{131}	—	May 23, 2010	WISE	WISE	·	3.4 km	MPC · JPL
483061	2015 KF_{132}	—	March 25, 2006	Kitt Peak	Spacewatch	·	1.9 km	MPC · JPL
483062	2015 KW_{143}	—	September 25, 2012	Mount Lemmon	Mount Lemmon Survey	(5)	1.0 km	MPC · JPL
483063	2015 KN_{144}	—	September 4, 2008	Kitt Peak	Spacewatch	MAS	750 m	MPC · JPL
483064	2015 KB_{155}	—	May 27, 1998	Kitt Peak	Spacewatch	·	2.2 km	MPC · JPL
483065	2015 KE_{157}	—	December 19, 2003	Socorro	LINEAR	H	650 m	MPC · JPL
483066	2015 KC_{160}	—	August 9, 2004	Anderson Mesa	LONEOS	NYS	1.2 km	MPC · JPL
483067	2015 LP_{1}	—	October 5, 2005	Mount Lemmon	Mount Lemmon Survey	H	430 m	MPC · JPL
483068	2015 LU_{5}	—	October 26, 2009	Mount Lemmon	Mount Lemmon Survey	·	870 m	MPC · JPL
483069	2015 LT_{14}	—	December 3, 2012	Mount Lemmon	Mount Lemmon Survey	·	1.1 km	MPC · JPL
483070	2015 LA_{18}	—	November 4, 2004	Kitt Peak	Spacewatch	·	2.5 km	MPC · JPL
483071	2015 LE_{20}	—	June 6, 2010	WISE	WISE	·	3.2 km	MPC · JPL
483072	2015 LJ_{30}	—	December 21, 2012	Mount Lemmon	Mount Lemmon Survey	·	1.5 km	MPC · JPL
483073	2015 LD_{31}	—	September 15, 2007	Anderson Mesa	LONEOS	·	1.5 km	MPC · JPL
483074	2015 LU_{34}	—	December 26, 2006	Kitt Peak	Spacewatch	·	2.1 km	MPC · JPL
483075	2015 LU_{35}	—	December 6, 2008	Kitt Peak	Spacewatch	·	1.4 km	MPC · JPL
483076	2015 LX_{35}	—	June 9, 2010	WISE	WISE	·	1.4 km	MPC · JPL
483077	2015 LJ_{38}	—	June 25, 2011	Kitt Peak	Spacewatch	·	1.6 km	MPC · JPL
483078	2015 LQ_{39}	—	November 13, 2006	Socorro	LINEAR	·	2.4 km	MPC · JPL
483079	2015 LU_{39}	—	April 15, 2007	Catalina	CSS	·	1.3 km	MPC · JPL
483080	2015 MH_{3}	—	November 3, 2008	Kitt Peak	Spacewatch	·	2.7 km	MPC · JPL
483081	2015 MY_{4}	—	February 10, 2002	Kitt Peak	Spacewatch	EMA	4.4 km	MPC · JPL
483082	2015 MP_{5}	—	November 25, 2012	Kitt Peak	Spacewatch	EUN	1.2 km	MPC · JPL
483083	2015 MT_{8}	—	October 8, 2004	Kitt Peak	Spacewatch	V	620 m	MPC · JPL
483084	2015 MS_{17}	—	October 4, 2006	Mount Lemmon	Mount Lemmon Survey	·	570 m	MPC · JPL
483085	2015 MJ_{49}	—	July 22, 2010	WISE	WISE	LIX	4.8 km	MPC · JPL
483086	2015 MM_{49}	—	November 20, 2008	Mount Lemmon	Mount Lemmon Survey	·	1.3 km	MPC · JPL
483087	2015 MO_{49}	—	October 29, 2005	Mount Lemmon	Mount Lemmon Survey	·	3.8 km	MPC · JPL
483088	2015 MF_{52}	—	May 20, 2006	Catalina	CSS	·	1.7 km	MPC · JPL
483089	2015 MD_{53}	—	January 29, 2014	Kitt Peak	Spacewatch	·	1.9 km	MPC · JPL
483090	2015 MW_{62}	—	April 23, 2014	Mount Lemmon	Mount Lemmon Survey	·	3.1 km	MPC · JPL
483091	2015 MG_{72}	—	July 18, 2007	Mount Lemmon	Mount Lemmon Survey	·	1.1 km	MPC · JPL
483092	2015 ML_{75}	—	September 19, 2003	Anderson Mesa	LONEOS	·	1.4 km	MPC · JPL
483093	2015 MG_{78}	—	June 27, 2011	Kitt Peak	Spacewatch	·	1.3 km	MPC · JPL
483094	2015 MZ_{79}	—	November 19, 2009	Kitt Peak	Spacewatch	·	920 m	MPC · JPL
483095	2015 MC_{80}	—	September 2, 2008	Kitt Peak	Spacewatch	·	1.2 km	MPC · JPL
483096	2015 MN_{83}	—	December 15, 2006	Kitt Peak	Spacewatch	·	2.3 km	MPC · JPL
483097	2015 MT_{84}	—	June 9, 2007	Kitt Peak	Spacewatch	·	1.5 km	MPC · JPL
483098	2015 MW_{85}	—	December 31, 2008	Kitt Peak	Spacewatch	·	1.2 km	MPC · JPL
483099	2015 MV_{87}	—	October 4, 1999	Kitt Peak	Spacewatch	·	1.2 km	MPC · JPL
483100	2015 MH_{88}	—	October 8, 2007	Mount Lemmon	Mount Lemmon Survey	·	1.4 km	MPC · JPL

== 483101–483200 ==
back to top

Designation			Discovery			Properties		Ref
Permanent	Provisional	Named after	Date	Site	Discoverer(s)	Category	Diam.	Ref
483101	2015 ML_{88}	—	October 19, 2007	Kitt Peak	Spacewatch	·	1.7 km	MPC · JPL
483102	2015 MN_{91}	—	June 27, 2009	Mount Lemmon	Mount Lemmon Survey	·	3.2 km	MPC · JPL
483103	2015 MV_{97}	—	June 18, 2010	WISE	WISE	·	2.7 km	MPC · JPL
483104	2015 MO_{108}	—	September 22, 2009	Kitt Peak	Spacewatch	·	720 m	MPC · JPL
483105	2015 MY_{108}	—	June 28, 2010	WISE	WISE	·	3.3 km	MPC · JPL
483106	2015 MR_{109}	—	April 4, 2008	Kitt Peak	Spacewatch	·	660 m	MPC · JPL
483107	2015 MS_{109}	—	July 6, 2010	WISE	WISE	·	2.5 km	MPC · JPL
483108	2015 ME_{113}	—	October 23, 2011	Mount Lemmon	Mount Lemmon Survey	·	1.7 km	MPC · JPL
483109	2015 MM_{118}	—	April 20, 2009	Kitt Peak	Spacewatch	·	2.2 km	MPC · JPL
483110	2015 MN_{118}	—	December 13, 2006	Kitt Peak	Spacewatch	·	3.4 km	MPC · JPL
483111	2015 MC_{121}	—	July 11, 2010	WISE	WISE	·	4.3 km	MPC · JPL
483112	2015 MK_{126}	—	April 4, 2014	Mount Lemmon	Mount Lemmon Survey	·	1.6 km	MPC · JPL
483113	2015 MP_{126}	—	February 11, 2008	Kitt Peak	Spacewatch	·	2.3 km	MPC · JPL
483114	2015 MO_{128}	—	November 5, 2005	Kitt Peak	Spacewatch	·	2.8 km	MPC · JPL
483115	2015 NC_{4}	—	May 25, 2007	Mount Lemmon	Mount Lemmon Survey	·	1.2 km	MPC · JPL
483116	2015 NL_{11}	—	December 12, 2004	Kitt Peak	Spacewatch	·	1.2 km	MPC · JPL
483117	2015 NG_{14}	—	January 10, 2006	Mount Lemmon	Mount Lemmon Survey	·	1.5 km	MPC · JPL
483118	2015 NV_{17}	—	March 1, 2005	Kitt Peak	Spacewatch	·	1.2 km	MPC · JPL
483119	2015 NT_{18}	—	January 9, 2002	Socorro	LINEAR	·	1.5 km	MPC · JPL
483120	2015 NU_{18}	—	January 23, 2006	Kitt Peak	Spacewatch	·	1.7 km	MPC · JPL
483121	2015 NJ_{20}	—	December 3, 2007	Kitt Peak	Spacewatch	·	3.5 km	MPC · JPL
483122	2015 NF_{23}	—	October 30, 2007	Mount Lemmon	Mount Lemmon Survey	·	1.7 km	MPC · JPL
483123	2015 OF_{1}	—	October 20, 2011	Mount Lemmon	Mount Lemmon Survey	AGN	1.2 km	MPC · JPL
483124	2015 OE_{7}	—	December 18, 2007	Kitt Peak	Spacewatch	·	2.5 km	MPC · JPL
483125	2015 OF_{10}	—	March 10, 2005	Mount Lemmon	Mount Lemmon Survey	·	1.3 km	MPC · JPL
483126	2015 OQ_{10}	—	December 1, 2008	Kitt Peak	Spacewatch	·	1.0 km	MPC · JPL
483127	2015 OS_{10}	—	October 9, 2010	Kitt Peak	Spacewatch	HYG	2.1 km	MPC · JPL
483128	2015 OC_{13}	—	September 21, 2011	Kitt Peak	Spacewatch	AGN	1.2 km	MPC · JPL
483129	2015 OD_{13}	—	April 7, 2005	Kitt Peak	Spacewatch	PAD	1.4 km	MPC · JPL
483130	2015 OG_{14}	—	December 15, 2009	Mount Lemmon	Mount Lemmon Survey	V	600 m	MPC · JPL
483131	2015 OC_{15}	—	July 30, 2010	WISE	WISE	·	3.3 km	MPC · JPL
483132	2015 OF_{15}	—	April 30, 2003	Kitt Peak	Spacewatch	·	1.1 km	MPC · JPL
483133	2015 OV_{16}	—	January 17, 2009	Kitt Peak	Spacewatch	·	1.1 km	MPC · JPL
483134	2015 OZ_{17}	—	March 31, 2014	Mount Lemmon	Mount Lemmon Survey	·	1.8 km	MPC · JPL
483135	2015 OD_{20}	—	December 12, 1999	Socorro	LINEAR	·	2.9 km	MPC · JPL
483136	2015 OA_{23}	—	April 25, 2006	Kitt Peak	Spacewatch	EUN	1.3 km	MPC · JPL
483137	2015 OL_{24}	—	September 12, 2004	Socorro	LINEAR	·	4.0 km	MPC · JPL
483138	2015 OA_{25}	—	June 23, 2010	WISE	WISE	·	3.2 km	MPC · JPL
483139	2015 OS_{40}	—	January 15, 2009	Kitt Peak	Spacewatch	·	1.9 km	MPC · JPL
483140	2015 OU_{40}	—	September 6, 1999	Kitt Peak	Spacewatch	T_{j} (2.94)	5.0 km	MPC · JPL
483141	2015 OO_{43}	—	February 2, 2008	Mount Lemmon	Mount Lemmon Survey	·	2.5 km	MPC · JPL
483142	2015 OQ_{44}	—	March 4, 2011	Mount Lemmon	Mount Lemmon Survey	·	680 m	MPC · JPL
483143	2015 OT_{44}	—	October 23, 2003	Kitt Peak	Spacewatch	·	1.3 km	MPC · JPL
483144	2015 OB_{50}	—	July 27, 2004	Siding Spring	SSS	·	5.2 km	MPC · JPL
483145	2015 OR_{50}	—	December 28, 2007	Kitt Peak	Spacewatch	·	2.1 km	MPC · JPL
483146	2015 OA_{57}	—	October 18, 2006	Kitt Peak	Spacewatch	·	1.8 km	MPC · JPL
483147	2015 OP_{67}	—	September 6, 2010	Socorro	LINEAR	·	3.0 km	MPC · JPL
483148	2015 OK_{68}	—	November 19, 1995	Kitt Peak	Spacewatch	·	900 m	MPC · JPL
483149	2015 OH_{69}	—	May 26, 2010	WISE	WISE	·	3.6 km	MPC · JPL
483150	2015 OM_{69}	—	November 26, 2005	Kitt Peak	Spacewatch	·	1.3 km	MPC · JPL
483151	2015 OX_{72}	—	August 28, 2006	Kitt Peak	Spacewatch	·	1.8 km	MPC · JPL
483152	2015 OC_{74}	—	July 20, 2010	WISE	WISE	LIX	3.1 km	MPC · JPL
483153	2015 PF_{2}	—	July 22, 2010	WISE	WISE	·	3.2 km	MPC · JPL
483154	2015 PJ_{3}	—	August 10, 2010	WISE	WISE	·	3.0 km	MPC · JPL
483155	2015 PO_{3}	—	July 29, 2010	WISE	WISE	LIX	3.7 km	MPC · JPL
483156	2015 PX_{4}	—	August 10, 2007	Kitt Peak	Spacewatch	·	1.4 km	MPC · JPL
483157	2015 PK_{5}	—	January 10, 2007	Mount Lemmon	Mount Lemmon Survey	·	3.0 km	MPC · JPL
483158	2015 PO_{8}	—	September 11, 2004	Kitt Peak	Spacewatch	·	2.9 km	MPC · JPL
483159	2015 PD_{9}	—	August 1, 2010	WISE	WISE	·	3.2 km	MPC · JPL
483160	2015 PN_{12}	—	December 25, 2005	Kitt Peak	Spacewatch	·	3.1 km	MPC · JPL
483161	2015 PL_{22}	—	July 15, 2010	WISE	WISE	LIX	3.2 km	MPC · JPL
483162	2015 PN_{31}	—	February 28, 2008	Kitt Peak	Spacewatch	EOS	1.7 km	MPC · JPL
483163	2015 PE_{34}	—	January 4, 2013	Mount Lemmon	Mount Lemmon Survey	·	1.3 km	MPC · JPL
483164	2015 PK_{34}	—	June 22, 2010	WISE	WISE	·	1.4 km	MPC · JPL
483165	2015 PR_{34}	—	February 1, 2009	Catalina	CSS	H	640 m	MPC · JPL
483166	2015 PB_{36}	—	December 13, 2006	Mount Lemmon	Mount Lemmon Survey	·	3.2 km	MPC · JPL
483167	2015 PZ_{36}	—	February 14, 2013	Kitt Peak	Spacewatch	·	1.5 km	MPC · JPL
483168	2015 PS_{39}	—	January 28, 2006	Kitt Peak	Spacewatch	·	1.3 km	MPC · JPL
483169	2015 PX_{39}	—	September 23, 2011	Kitt Peak	Spacewatch	·	1.7 km	MPC · JPL
483170	2015 PD_{42}	—	March 10, 2005	Mount Lemmon	Mount Lemmon Survey	·	1.8 km	MPC · JPL
483171	2015 PG_{43}	—	July 20, 2010	WISE	WISE	EOS	2.7 km	MPC · JPL
483172	2015 PZ_{45}	—	May 8, 2005	Kitt Peak	Spacewatch	·	1.8 km	MPC · JPL
483173	2015 PR_{48}	—	July 19, 2010	WISE	WISE	VER	3.4 km	MPC · JPL
483174	2015 PC_{51}	—	July 25, 2010	WISE	WISE	·	3.8 km	MPC · JPL
483175	2015 PF_{53}	—	April 20, 2007	Kitt Peak	Spacewatch	PHO	1.0 km	MPC · JPL
483176	2015 PD_{55}	—	February 22, 2006	Catalina	CSS	·	3.5 km	MPC · JPL
483177	2015 PE_{57}	—	February 15, 2001	Socorro	LINEAR	H	630 m	MPC · JPL
483178	2015 PM_{81}	—	September 2, 2010	Mount Lemmon	Mount Lemmon Survey	·	2.0 km	MPC · JPL
483179	2015 PD_{86}	—	June 16, 2010	WISE	WISE	·	3.3 km	MPC · JPL
483180	2015 PP_{97}	—	June 21, 2010	WISE	WISE	·	2.4 km	MPC · JPL
483181	2015 PR_{99}	—	October 7, 2005	Kitt Peak	Spacewatch	·	1.0 km	MPC · JPL
483182	2015 PU_{99}	—	November 25, 2005	Kitt Peak	Spacewatch	·	900 m	MPC · JPL
483183	2015 PX_{102}	—	January 20, 2009	Catalina	CSS	·	1.5 km	MPC · JPL
483184	2015 PF_{112}	—	November 18, 2007	Mount Lemmon	Mount Lemmon Survey	·	1.2 km	MPC · JPL
483185	2015 PL_{126}	—	November 2, 2007	Kitt Peak	Spacewatch	·	1.6 km	MPC · JPL
483186	2015 PM_{126}	—	February 2, 2009	Kitt Peak	Spacewatch	·	1.7 km	MPC · JPL
483187	2015 PT_{138}	—	February 24, 2003	Bergisch Gladbach	W. Bickel	·	1.3 km	MPC · JPL
483188	2015 PS_{140}	—	March 28, 2008	Mount Lemmon	Mount Lemmon Survey	·	2.5 km	MPC · JPL
483189	2015 PY_{163}	—	October 18, 2007	Kitt Peak	Spacewatch	·	1.4 km	MPC · JPL
483190	2015 PJ_{165}	—	February 26, 2007	Mount Lemmon	Mount Lemmon Survey	NYS	1.2 km	MPC · JPL
483191	2015 PZ_{175}	—	August 3, 2010	WISE	WISE	·	2.4 km	MPC · JPL
483192	2015 PL_{218}	—	November 8, 2010	Mount Lemmon	Mount Lemmon Survey	·	2.7 km	MPC · JPL
483193	2015 PX_{218}	—	May 16, 2005	Kitt Peak	Spacewatch	·	1.9 km	MPC · JPL
483194	2015 PX_{221}	—	May 12, 2010	Mount Lemmon	Mount Lemmon Survey	MAR	1.0 km	MPC · JPL
483195	2015 PP_{229}	—	March 27, 2004	Kitt Peak	Spacewatch	·	2.1 km	MPC · JPL
483196	2015 PQ_{229}	—	July 14, 2009	Kitt Peak	Spacewatch	·	4.6 km	MPC · JPL
483197	2015 PZ_{284}	—	December 18, 2009	Kitt Peak	Spacewatch	·	1.3 km	MPC · JPL
483198	2015 PW_{289}	—	October 7, 2005	Kitt Peak	Spacewatch	·	2.4 km	MPC · JPL
483199	2015 PW_{291}	—	October 6, 2004	Palomar	NEAT	·	4.2 km	MPC · JPL
483200	2015 PF_{295}	—	December 15, 2007	Kitt Peak	Spacewatch	·	1.4 km	MPC · JPL

== 483201–483300 ==
back to top

Designation			Discovery			Properties		Ref
Permanent	Provisional	Named after	Date	Site	Discoverer(s)	Category	Diam.	Ref
483201	2015 PO_{295}	—	February 11, 2008	Mount Lemmon	Mount Lemmon Survey	·	2.9 km	MPC · JPL
483202	2015 PY_{301}	—	April 28, 2003	Kitt Peak	Spacewatch	·	2.6 km	MPC · JPL
483203	2015 PG_{303}	—	December 30, 2011	Kitt Peak	Spacewatch	VER	2.3 km	MPC · JPL
483204	2015 PW_{303}	—	January 15, 2010	WISE	WISE	SYL · CYB	4.5 km	MPC · JPL
483205	2015 PK_{306}	—	January 31, 2006	Kitt Peak	Spacewatch	·	1.2 km	MPC · JPL
483206	2015 PS_{306}	—	May 4, 2005	Kitt Peak	Spacewatch	·	2.0 km	MPC · JPL
483207	2015 PO_{310}	—	April 2, 2009	Mount Lemmon	Mount Lemmon Survey	·	2.7 km	MPC · JPL
483208	2015 PR_{310}	—	July 7, 2010	WISE	WISE	·	2.9 km	MPC · JPL
483209	2015 PH_{311}	—	January 27, 2004	Kitt Peak	Spacewatch	·	1.8 km	MPC · JPL
483210	2015 PN_{311}	—	February 23, 2006	Kitt Peak	Spacewatch	H	530 m	MPC · JPL
483211	2015 QE_{4}	—	July 29, 2009	Catalina	CSS	·	4.5 km	MPC · JPL
483212	2015 QJ_{6}	—	September 7, 2004	Kitt Peak	Spacewatch	·	2.8 km	MPC · JPL
483213	2015 QY_{9}	—	December 4, 2007	Mount Lemmon	Mount Lemmon Survey	·	1.9 km	MPC · JPL
483214	2015 RN_{4}	—	July 27, 2010	WISE	WISE	·	3.9 km	MPC · JPL
483215	2015 RK_{22}	—	April 22, 2007	Kitt Peak	Spacewatch	·	860 m	MPC · JPL
483216	2015 RF_{23}	—	September 7, 2004	Kitt Peak	Spacewatch	·	3.0 km	MPC · JPL
483217	2015 RW_{23}	—	July 16, 2010	WISE	WISE	·	2.7 km	MPC · JPL
483218	2015 RH_{25}	—	September 28, 2011	Mount Lemmon	Mount Lemmon Survey	·	1.7 km	MPC · JPL
483219	2015 RL_{26}	—	February 12, 2008	Mount Lemmon	Mount Lemmon Survey	·	2.5 km	MPC · JPL
483220	2015 RT_{31}	—	February 9, 2007	Kitt Peak	Spacewatch	·	3.8 km	MPC · JPL
483221	2015 RP_{37}	—	March 14, 2007	Kitt Peak	Spacewatch	·	3.8 km	MPC · JPL
483222	2015 RA_{38}	—	February 23, 2001	Kitt Peak	Spacewatch	·	2.9 km	MPC · JPL
483223	2015 RT_{44}	—	March 13, 2007	Mount Lemmon	Mount Lemmon Survey	·	2.2 km	MPC · JPL
483224	2015 RQ_{52}	—	September 25, 2006	Kitt Peak	Spacewatch	AGN	1.1 km	MPC · JPL
483225	2015 RG_{53}	—	January 19, 1996	Kitt Peak	Spacewatch	·	1.7 km	MPC · JPL
483226	2015 RG_{56}	—	September 17, 2006	Catalina	CSS	WIT	970 m	MPC · JPL
483227	2015 RZ_{56}	—	April 15, 2007	Kitt Peak	Spacewatch	·	2.8 km	MPC · JPL
483228	2015 RE_{59}	—	April 5, 2000	Kitt Peak	Spacewatch	·	1.3 km	MPC · JPL
483229	2015 RC_{63}	—	August 10, 2007	Kitt Peak	Spacewatch	3:2	4.3 km	MPC · JPL
483230	2015 RE_{70}	—	November 5, 2005	Kitt Peak	Spacewatch	·	1.7 km	MPC · JPL
483231	2015 RW_{73}	—	November 7, 2010	Mount Lemmon	Mount Lemmon Survey	·	2.2 km	MPC · JPL
483232	2015 RE_{81}	—	August 30, 2005	Kitt Peak	Spacewatch	KOR	1.3 km	MPC · JPL
483233	2015 RE_{86}	—	September 11, 2004	Socorro	LINEAR	·	2.4 km	MPC · JPL
483234	2015 RJ_{87}	—	December 11, 2004	Catalina	CSS	·	3.7 km	MPC · JPL
483235	2015 RU_{89}	—	November 12, 2005	Kitt Peak	Spacewatch	EOS	2.0 km	MPC · JPL
483236	2015 RR_{98}	—	September 11, 2004	Kitt Peak	Spacewatch	·	3.0 km	MPC · JPL
483237	2015 RD_{101}	—	November 10, 2004	Kitt Peak	Spacewatch	·	1.5 km	MPC · JPL
483238	2015 RY_{103}	—	January 20, 2010	WISE	WISE	ULA · CYB	5.7 km	MPC · JPL
483239	2015 RM_{123}	—	September 11, 2004	Kitt Peak	Spacewatch	·	3.3 km	MPC · JPL
483240	2015 RY_{125}	—	August 20, 2004	Kitt Peak	Spacewatch	EOS	2.1 km	MPC · JPL
483241	2015 RO_{143}	—	December 17, 1999	Kitt Peak	Spacewatch	·	1.4 km	MPC · JPL
483242	2015 RK_{158}	—	December 1, 2005	Mount Lemmon	Mount Lemmon Survey	·	950 m	MPC · JPL
483243	2015 RT_{192}	—	January 30, 2006	Kitt Peak	Spacewatch	·	2.6 km	MPC · JPL
483244	2015 RP_{199}	—	September 17, 2010	Mount Lemmon	Mount Lemmon Survey	·	2.2 km	MPC · JPL
483245	2015 RO_{223}	—	October 31, 2006	Kitt Peak	Spacewatch	MRX	1.0 km	MPC · JPL
483246	2015 SK_{1}	—	January 14, 2002	Socorro	LINEAR	·	2.0 km	MPC · JPL
483247	2015 SG_{2}	—	October 17, 2010	Mount Lemmon	Mount Lemmon Survey	·	3.0 km	MPC · JPL
483248	2015 SK_{3}	—	June 9, 2007	Kitt Peak	Spacewatch	CYB	4.2 km	MPC · JPL
483249	2015 SZ_{3}	—	November 16, 2010	Mount Lemmon	Mount Lemmon Survey	·	3.1 km	MPC · JPL
483250	2015 SP_{7}	—	May 24, 2004	Kitt Peak	Spacewatch	·	2.6 km	MPC · JPL
483251	2015 SR_{7}	—	September 15, 2004	Socorro	LINEAR	·	4.4 km	MPC · JPL
483252	2015 SA_{8}	—	February 24, 2006	Mount Lemmon	Mount Lemmon Survey	·	3.7 km	MPC · JPL
483253	2015 SK_{11}	—	March 9, 2007	Kitt Peak	Spacewatch	·	2.4 km	MPC · JPL
483254	2015 SW_{12}	—	February 27, 2007	Kitt Peak	Spacewatch	·	3.2 km	MPC · JPL
483255	2015 TS_{7}	—	December 31, 2005	Kitt Peak	Spacewatch	EOS	2.4 km	MPC · JPL
483256	2015 TX_{14}	—	September 16, 2010	Mount Lemmon	Mount Lemmon Survey	EOS	2.2 km	MPC · JPL
483257	2015 TJ_{16}	—	March 3, 2006	Kitt Peak	Spacewatch	·	2.4 km	MPC · JPL
483258	2015 TH_{62}	—	March 23, 2004	Socorro	LINEAR	·	2.4 km	MPC · JPL
483259	2015 TT_{67}	—	October 11, 2004	Kitt Peak	Spacewatch	·	2.6 km	MPC · JPL
483260	2015 TL_{86}	—	September 18, 2003	Kitt Peak	Spacewatch	·	2.9 km	MPC · JPL
483261	2015 TE_{105}	—	March 22, 2012	Catalina	CSS	·	3.6 km	MPC · JPL
483262	2015 TR_{136}	—	March 12, 2007	Catalina	CSS	EMA	3.9 km	MPC · JPL
483263	2015 TJ_{142}	—	September 27, 2009	Mount Lemmon	Mount Lemmon Survey	·	2.9 km	MPC · JPL
483264	2015 TG_{148}	—	September 26, 2011	Kitt Peak	Spacewatch	·	1.8 km	MPC · JPL
483265	2015 TP_{152}	—	April 2, 2002	Kitt Peak	Spacewatch	MAS	810 m	MPC · JPL
483266	2015 TZ_{170}	—	September 17, 2009	Mount Lemmon	Mount Lemmon Survey	·	2.6 km	MPC · JPL
483267	2015 TG_{178}	—	July 28, 2006	Siding Spring	SSS	·	2.6 km	MPC · JPL
483268	2015 TO_{183}	—	September 30, 2005	Mount Lemmon	Mount Lemmon Survey	·	1.9 km	MPC · JPL
483269	2015 TT_{183}	—	October 27, 2005	Kitt Peak	Spacewatch	·	1.9 km	MPC · JPL
483270	2015 TT_{193}	—	September 27, 2011	Mount Lemmon	Mount Lemmon Survey	·	1.7 km	MPC · JPL
483271	2015 TT_{195}	—	October 23, 2006	Catalina	CSS	·	2.6 km	MPC · JPL
483272	2015 TR_{203}	—	August 27, 2004	Anderson Mesa	LONEOS	·	3.1 km	MPC · JPL
483273	2015 TZ_{207}	—	July 28, 2009	Kitt Peak	Spacewatch	·	3.2 km	MPC · JPL
483274	2015 TR_{215}	—	November 10, 2004	Kitt Peak	Spacewatch	THM	1.8 km	MPC · JPL
483275	2015 TV_{218}	—	April 4, 2014	Kitt Peak	Spacewatch	EUN	1.1 km	MPC · JPL
483276	2015 TW_{232}	—	October 23, 2004	Kitt Peak	Spacewatch	LIX	2.9 km	MPC · JPL
483277	2015 TO_{245}	—	February 17, 2001	Kitt Peak	Spacewatch	EOS	2.1 km	MPC · JPL
483278	2015 TZ_{246}	—	October 7, 2004	Kitt Peak	Spacewatch	·	2.3 km	MPC · JPL
483279	2015 TW_{253}	—	April 22, 2009	Mount Lemmon	Mount Lemmon Survey	·	1.5 km	MPC · JPL
483280	2015 TB_{257}	—	March 20, 2007	Mount Lemmon	Mount Lemmon Survey	·	3.0 km	MPC · JPL
483281	2015 TY_{273}	—	November 1, 2010	Mount Lemmon	Mount Lemmon Survey	EOS	1.5 km	MPC · JPL
483282	2015 TC_{283}	—	November 10, 1996	Kitt Peak	Spacewatch	·	1.7 km	MPC · JPL
483283	2015 TR_{289}	—	December 30, 2007	Kitt Peak	Spacewatch	·	2.0 km	MPC · JPL
483284	2015 TH_{294}	—	February 17, 2013	Kitt Peak	Spacewatch	·	2.0 km	MPC · JPL
483285	2015 TA_{303}	—	October 19, 2007	Mount Lemmon	Mount Lemmon Survey	T_{j} (2.95)	3.7 km	MPC · JPL
483286	2015 TU_{311}	—	September 21, 2009	Catalina	CSS	·	4.5 km	MPC · JPL
483287	2015 TX_{317}	—	October 12, 1999	Kitt Peak	Spacewatch	·	2.5 km	MPC · JPL
483288	2015 TT_{319}	—	March 27, 2003	Kitt Peak	Spacewatch	NYS	960 m	MPC · JPL
483289	2015 TS_{320}	—	October 11, 2004	Kitt Peak	Spacewatch	·	2.5 km	MPC · JPL
483290	2015 TV_{341}	—	April 1, 2008	Mount Lemmon	Mount Lemmon Survey	·	6.2 km	MPC · JPL
483291	2015 TD_{344}	—	January 25, 2006	Kitt Peak	Spacewatch	·	2.3 km	MPC · JPL
483292	2015 TP_{345}	—	May 2, 2010	WISE	WISE	·	2.5 km	MPC · JPL
483293	2015 TW_{348}	—	February 21, 2006	Mount Lemmon	Mount Lemmon Survey	·	2.9 km	MPC · JPL
483294	2015 UC_{2}	—	March 20, 2004	Kitt Peak	Spacewatch	·	1.5 km	MPC · JPL
483295	2015 UT_{8}	—	September 11, 2005	Kitt Peak	Spacewatch	KOR	1.2 km	MPC · JPL
483296	2015 UJ_{9}	—	December 4, 2005	Mount Lemmon	Mount Lemmon Survey	·	2.0 km	MPC · JPL
483297	2015 UX_{13}	—	September 30, 2006	Mount Lemmon	Mount Lemmon Survey	AST	1.5 km	MPC · JPL
483298	2015 UX_{14}	—	February 7, 2002	Socorro	LINEAR	MAS	760 m	MPC · JPL
483299	2015 US_{30}	—	September 16, 2009	Mount Lemmon	Mount Lemmon Survey	·	3.2 km	MPC · JPL
483300	2015 UK_{32}	—	March 26, 2008	Mount Lemmon	Mount Lemmon Survey	KOR	1.5 km	MPC · JPL

== 483301–483400 ==
back to top

Designation			Discovery			Properties		Ref
Permanent	Provisional	Named after	Date	Site	Discoverer(s)	Category	Diam.	Ref
483301	2015 UM_{38}	—	February 25, 2007	Mount Lemmon	Mount Lemmon Survey	EOS	2.0 km	MPC · JPL
483302	2015 UU_{42}	—	February 25, 2012	Kitt Peak	Spacewatch	EMA	2.6 km	MPC · JPL
483303	2015 UZ_{43}	—	February 25, 2007	Mount Lemmon	Mount Lemmon Survey	EOS	2.0 km	MPC · JPL
483304	2015 UK_{44}	—	October 30, 2005	Kitt Peak	Spacewatch	·	2.2 km	MPC · JPL
483305	2015 UD_{56}	—	December 7, 1999	Kitt Peak	Spacewatch	·	2.5 km	MPC · JPL
483306	2015 UB_{83}	—	January 26, 2006	Kitt Peak	Spacewatch	·	3.3 km	MPC · JPL
483307	2015 VT_{3}	—	October 19, 2007	Catalina	CSS	·	1.2 km	MPC · JPL
483308	2015 VC_{29}	—	September 25, 2007	Mount Lemmon	Mount Lemmon Survey	·	1.2 km	MPC · JPL
483309	2015 VC_{62}	—	September 16, 2009	Catalina	CSS	·	3.0 km	MPC · JPL
483310	2015 VY_{66}	—	September 30, 1998	Kitt Peak	Spacewatch	·	3.7 km	MPC · JPL
483311	2015 VW_{79}	—	March 12, 2002	Palomar	NEAT	·	1.7 km	MPC · JPL
483312	2015 VT_{122}	—	March 11, 2007	Mount Lemmon	Mount Lemmon Survey	·	3.3 km	MPC · JPL
483313	2015 VR_{126}	—	September 18, 2009	Kitt Peak	Spacewatch	·	2.9 km	MPC · JPL
483314	2015 VA_{143}	—	December 21, 2005	Kitt Peak	Spacewatch	·	3.3 km	MPC · JPL
483315	2015 VD_{143}	—	April 13, 2008	Mount Lemmon	Mount Lemmon Survey	·	3.3 km	MPC · JPL
483316	2015 VQ_{149}	—	September 27, 2003	Kitt Peak	Spacewatch	·	3.1 km	MPC · JPL
483317	2015 WO_{9}	—	September 14, 2009	Catalina	CSS	·	3.1 km	MPC · JPL
483318	2015 XT_{110}	—	April 22, 2007	Kitt Peak	Spacewatch	·	3.6 km	MPC · JPL
483319	2016 AJ_{15}	—	May 7, 2003	Catalina	CSS	·	3.3 km	MPC · JPL
483320	2016 LV_{11}	—	October 22, 2006	Mount Lemmon	Mount Lemmon Survey	·	1.5 km	MPC · JPL
483321	2016 NS_{21}	—	September 1, 2005	Anderson Mesa	LONEOS	·	3.7 km	MPC · JPL
483322	2016 NN_{23}	—	July 29, 2005	Siding Spring	SSS	·	2.9 km	MPC · JPL
483323	2016 OG	—	September 18, 1998	Anderson Mesa	LONEOS	ERI	2.8 km	MPC · JPL
483324	2016 OP	—	December 15, 2006	Kitt Peak	Spacewatch	H	500 m	MPC · JPL
483325	2016 OP_{2}	—	September 28, 2006	Catalina	CSS	·	820 m	MPC · JPL
483326	2016 PQ_{6}	—	October 23, 2003	Kitt Peak	Spacewatch	·	4.2 km	MPC · JPL
483327	2016 PJ_{14}	—	December 25, 2013	Mount Lemmon	Mount Lemmon Survey	·	1.8 km	MPC · JPL
483328	2016 PT_{71}	—	August 30, 2005	Kitt Peak	Spacewatch	EOS	2.1 km	MPC · JPL
483329	2016 PX_{72}	—	July 30, 2005	Campo Imperatore	CINEOS	·	1.0 km	MPC · JPL
483330	2016 PT_{75}	—	November 17, 2006	Kitt Peak	Spacewatch	·	1.0 km	MPC · JPL
483331	2016 PO_{77}	—	September 16, 2006	Catalina	CSS	·	690 m	MPC · JPL
483332	2016 PW_{77}	—	August 5, 2005	Palomar	NEAT	·	3.1 km	MPC · JPL
483333	2016 PQ_{78}	—	June 1, 2010	WISE	WISE	·	4.7 km	MPC · JPL
483334	2016 QF_{28}	—	September 10, 2004	Socorro	LINEAR	·	1.5 km	MPC · JPL
483335	2016 QU_{45}	—	February 25, 2011	Kitt Peak	Spacewatch	·	2.5 km	MPC · JPL
483336	2016 QC_{71}	—	December 13, 2006	Mount Lemmon	Mount Lemmon Survey	HYG	2.7 km	MPC · JPL
483337	2016 QR_{71}	—	October 27, 2006	Kitt Peak	Spacewatch	V	840 m	MPC · JPL
483338	2016 QY_{72}	—	October 8, 2007	Catalina	CSS	·	2.2 km	MPC · JPL
483339	2016 QD_{75}	—	October 1, 2005	Catalina	CSS	·	3.3 km	MPC · JPL
483340	2016 QK_{75}	—	March 31, 2010	WISE	WISE	·	3.8 km	MPC · JPL
483341	2016 QW_{75}	—	June 20, 1999	Kitt Peak	Spacewatch	·	3.1 km	MPC · JPL
483342	2016 QL_{76}	—	June 13, 2005	Mount Lemmon	Mount Lemmon Survey	(1118)	4.2 km	MPC · JPL
483343	2016 QQ_{76}	—	October 6, 1999	Socorro	LINEAR	·	640 m	MPC · JPL
483344	2016 QU_{77}	—	September 25, 1995	Kitt Peak	Spacewatch	·	2.8 km	MPC · JPL
483345	2016 QA_{78}	—	December 22, 2006	Kitt Peak	Spacewatch	·	3.2 km	MPC · JPL
483346	2016 QF_{78}	—	October 9, 2007	Kitt Peak	Spacewatch	·	2.1 km	MPC · JPL
483347	2016 QZ_{78}	—	December 1, 2005	Mount Lemmon	Mount Lemmon Survey	EUN	1.5 km	MPC · JPL
483348	2016 QT_{80}	—	November 2, 2011	Mount Lemmon	Mount Lemmon Survey	·	3.2 km	MPC · JPL
483349	2016 QW_{80}	—	August 31, 2005	Anderson Mesa	LONEOS	·	3.8 km	MPC · JPL
483350	2016 QJ_{82}	—	August 29, 2006	Catalina	CSS	·	690 m	MPC · JPL
483351	2016 QU_{84}	—	March 18, 2004	Siding Spring	SSS	H	890 m	MPC · JPL
483352	2016 RA	—	March 1, 2011	Mount Lemmon	Mount Lemmon Survey	·	1.3 km	MPC · JPL
483353	2016 RQ	—	July 10, 2007	Siding Spring	SSS	·	1.7 km	MPC · JPL
483354	2016 RQ_{3}	—	July 25, 2008	Siding Spring	SSS	V	800 m	MPC · JPL
483355	2016 RJ_{7}	—	September 16, 2012	Catalina	CSS	·	1.2 km	MPC · JPL
483356	2016 RK_{10}	—	October 16, 2009	Catalina	CSS	·	1.2 km	MPC · JPL
483357	2016 RQ_{10}	—	November 18, 2006	Kitt Peak	Spacewatch	·	3.3 km	MPC · JPL
483358	2016 RC_{27}	—	March 28, 2008	Mount Lemmon	Mount Lemmon Survey	·	1.0 km	MPC · JPL
483359	2016 RA_{33}	—	May 9, 2002	Socorro	LINEAR	·	2.2 km	MPC · JPL
483360	2016 RY_{34}	—	October 21, 2008	Kitt Peak	Spacewatch	(5)	950 m	MPC · JPL
483361	2016 RL_{36}	—	November 8, 2007	Kitt Peak	Spacewatch	KOR	1.4 km	MPC · JPL
483362	2016 RL_{39}	—	September 20, 2006	Anderson Mesa	LONEOS	·	810 m	MPC · JPL
483363	2016 RV_{40}	—	November 20, 1995	Kitt Peak	Spacewatch	·	650 m	MPC · JPL
483364	2016 SE_{3}	—	December 21, 2003	Socorro	LINEAR	H	530 m	MPC · JPL
483365	2016 SW_{10}	—	January 8, 2006	Mount Lemmon	Mount Lemmon Survey	·	1.0 km	MPC · JPL
483366	2016 SO_{13}	—	October 23, 2009	Kitt Peak	Spacewatch	3:2	6.1 km	MPC · JPL
483367	2016 SA_{15}	—	November 5, 2007	Mount Lemmon	Mount Lemmon Survey	·	1.7 km	MPC · JPL
483368	2016 SH_{15}	—	May 8, 2006	Mount Lemmon	Mount Lemmon Survey	·	700 m	MPC · JPL
483369	2016 SJ_{17}	—	January 23, 2006	Catalina	CSS	·	1.5 km	MPC · JPL
483370	2016 SF_{18}	—	August 25, 2012	Mount Lemmon	Mount Lemmon Survey	·	1.4 km	MPC · JPL
483371	2016 SB_{32}	—	January 7, 1999	Kitt Peak	Spacewatch	·	2.5 km	MPC · JPL
483372	2016 SV_{36}	—	October 4, 2007	Kitt Peak	Spacewatch	·	1.6 km	MPC · JPL
483373	2016 SN_{45}	—	January 8, 2010	Kitt Peak	Spacewatch	·	1.1 km	MPC · JPL
483374	2016 SX_{45}	—	June 30, 2005	Kitt Peak	Spacewatch	·	2.1 km	MPC · JPL
483375	2016 TM_{5}	—	September 29, 2005	Catalina	CSS	·	2.7 km	MPC · JPL
483376	2016 TK_{6}	—	September 28, 2008	Mount Lemmon	Mount Lemmon Survey	H	370 m	MPC · JPL
483377	2016 TU_{6}	—	October 25, 2005	Kitt Peak	Spacewatch	LIX	3.3 km	MPC · JPL
483378	2016 TJ_{9}	—	July 2, 2010	WISE	WISE	·	2.5 km	MPC · JPL
483379	2016 TP_{9}	—	March 13, 2007	Kitt Peak	Spacewatch	·	3.2 km	MPC · JPL
483380	2016 TA_{13}	—	October 23, 2005	Catalina	CSS	·	3.1 km	MPC · JPL
483381	2016 TX_{16}	—	February 18, 2008	Mount Lemmon	Mount Lemmon Survey	·	4.4 km	MPC · JPL
483382	2016 TZ_{16}	—	February 18, 2010	Mount Lemmon	Mount Lemmon Survey	·	2.0 km	MPC · JPL
483383	2016 TW_{20}	—	December 17, 2009	Mount Lemmon	Mount Lemmon Survey	·	1.2 km	MPC · JPL
483384	2016 TB_{29}	—	December 14, 2007	Mount Lemmon	Mount Lemmon Survey	·	970 m	MPC · JPL
483385	2016 TV_{41}	—	March 13, 2010	Kitt Peak	Spacewatch	EUN	1.0 km	MPC · JPL
483386	2016 TS_{47}	—	September 11, 2004	Kitt Peak	Spacewatch	·	2.8 km	MPC · JPL
483387	2016 TX_{52}	—	October 29, 2008	Mount Lemmon	Mount Lemmon Survey	MAR	1.0 km	MPC · JPL
483388	2016 TD_{57}	—	October 10, 1999	Socorro	LINEAR	H	600 m	MPC · JPL
483389	2016 TN_{66}	—	November 3, 2008	Kitt Peak	Spacewatch	·	1 km	MPC · JPL
483390	5059 T-3	—	October 16, 1977	Palomar	C. J. van Houten, I. van Houten-Groeneveld, T. Gehrels	·	740 m	MPC · JPL
483391	1991 TT_{16}	—	October 6, 1991	Palomar	Lowe, A.	·	700 m	MPC · JPL
483392	1994 RY_{5}	—	September 12, 1994	Kitt Peak	Spacewatch	·	1.6 km	MPC · JPL
483393	1994 SQ_{6}	—	September 28, 1994	Kitt Peak	Spacewatch	·	1.5 km	MPC · JPL
483394	1995 CZ_{4}	—	February 1, 1995	Kitt Peak	Spacewatch	·	700 m	MPC · JPL
483395	1995 FG_{15}	—	March 27, 1995	Kitt Peak	Spacewatch	NYS	910 m	MPC · JPL
483396	1995 ST_{11}	—	September 18, 1995	Kitt Peak	Spacewatch	·	820 m	MPC · JPL
483397	1995 SH_{67}	—	September 17, 1995	Kitt Peak	Spacewatch	·	600 m	MPC · JPL
483398	1996 JU_{8}	—	April 24, 1996	Kitt Peak	Spacewatch	·	2.1 km	MPC · JPL
483399	1997 HZ_{3}	—	April 30, 1997	Kitt Peak	Spacewatch	·	1.7 km	MPC · JPL
483400	1997 LY_{13}	—	June 8, 1997	La Silla	E. W. Elst	L5	10 km	MPC · JPL

== 483401–483500 ==
back to top

Designation			Discovery			Properties		Ref
Permanent	Provisional	Named after	Date	Site	Discoverer(s)	Category	Diam.	Ref
483401	1997 MQ	—	June 27, 1997	Kitt Peak	Spacewatch	T_{j} (2.98)	3.0 km	MPC · JPL
483402	1998 SR_{20}	—	September 21, 1998	Kitt Peak	Spacewatch	·	2.7 km	MPC · JPL
483403	1998 TU_{13}	—	October 13, 1998	Kitt Peak	Spacewatch	·	670 m	MPC · JPL
483404	1998 XG_{20}	—	December 10, 1998	Kitt Peak	Spacewatch	·	920 m	MPC · JPL
483405	1999 CP_{2}	—	February 7, 1999	Cloudcroft	W. Offutt	·	1.6 km	MPC · JPL
483406	1999 RK_{30}	—	September 8, 1999	Socorro	LINEAR	·	1.4 km	MPC · JPL
483407	1999 SL_{1}	—	September 16, 1999	Woomera	F. B. Zoltowski	·	1.6 km	MPC · JPL
483408	1999 TZ_{4}	—	October 2, 1999	Catalina	CSS	AMO	430 m	MPC · JPL
483409	1999 TE_{114}	—	October 4, 1999	Socorro	LINEAR	·	610 m	MPC · JPL
483410	1999 TN_{171}	—	October 10, 1999	Socorro	LINEAR	(5)	900 m	MPC · JPL
483411	1999 VR_{16}	—	November 2, 1999	Kitt Peak	Spacewatch	·	560 m	MPC · JPL
483412	1999 VK_{41}	—	November 2, 1999	Kitt Peak	Spacewatch	·	770 m	MPC · JPL
483413	1999 VD_{46}	—	October 2, 1999	Catalina	CSS	H	510 m	MPC · JPL
483414	1999 VQ_{91}	—	October 1, 1999	Eskridge	G. Hug	·	1.6 km	MPC · JPL
483415	1999 VN_{138}	—	November 9, 1999	Kitt Peak	Spacewatch	·	580 m	MPC · JPL
483416	1999 YD_{6}	—	December 30, 1999	Socorro	LINEAR	T_{j} (2.97)	2.3 km	MPC · JPL
483417	1999 YJ_{8}	—	December 27, 1999	Kitt Peak	Spacewatch	·	1.3 km	MPC · JPL
483418	2000 BK_{22}	—	January 30, 2000	Kitt Peak	Spacewatch	·	1.3 km	MPC · JPL
483419	2000 BM_{47}	—	January 30, 2000	Kitt Peak	Spacewatch	·	1.4 km	MPC · JPL
483420	2000 CX_{39}	—	January 11, 2000	Socorro	LINEAR	·	1.4 km	MPC · JPL
483421	2000 CD_{40}	—	February 3, 2000	Socorro	LINEAR	·	2.1 km	MPC · JPL
483422	2000 CE_{59}	—	February 4, 2000	Socorro	LINEAR	APO · PHA	280 m	MPC · JPL
483423	2000 DO_{1}	—	February 16, 2000	Catalina	CSS	APO · PHA	280 m	MPC · JPL
483424	2000 DY_{85}	—	February 29, 2000	Socorro	LINEAR	·	1.4 km	MPC · JPL
483425	2000 EG_{4}	—	March 4, 2000	Socorro	LINEAR	·	1.9 km	MPC · JPL
483426	2000 FU_{10}	—	March 30, 2000	Kitt Peak	Spacewatch	T_{j} (2.99)	3.3 km	MPC · JPL
483427	2000 GX_{11}	—	March 26, 2000	Anderson Mesa	LONEOS	·	1.3 km	MPC · JPL
483428	2000 HK_{18}	—	April 25, 2000	Kitt Peak	Spacewatch	·	1.4 km	MPC · JPL
483429	2000 LN_{29}	—	June 11, 2000	Anderson Mesa	LONEOS	·	840 m	MPC · JPL
483430	2000 QC_{33}	—	August 10, 2000	Socorro	LINEAR	·	1.0 km	MPC · JPL
483431	2001 BC_{65}	—	January 31, 2001	Socorro	LINEAR	H	420 m	MPC · JPL
483432	2001 DF_{47}	—	February 19, 2001	Socorro	LINEAR	APO · PHA	290 m	MPC · JPL
483433	2001 FL_{83}	—	March 21, 2001	Kitt Peak	Spacewatch	·	2.8 km	MPC · JPL
483434	2001 GE_{1}	—	April 13, 2001	Socorro	LINEAR	·	2.1 km	MPC · JPL
483435	2001 HV_{18}	—	April 25, 2001	Anderson Mesa	LONEOS	T_{j} (2.94)	2.5 km	MPC · JPL
483436	2001 PY_{66}	—	August 11, 2001	Palomar	NEAT	·	2.4 km	MPC · JPL
483437	2001 QY_{53}	—	August 16, 2001	Socorro	LINEAR	·	790 m	MPC · JPL
483438	2001 QO_{228}	—	August 24, 2001	Anderson Mesa	LONEOS	·	1.1 km	MPC · JPL
483439	2001 QX_{300}	—	August 19, 2001	Cerro Tololo	M. W. Buie	·	620 m	MPC · JPL
483440	2001 RD_{155}	—	September 12, 2001	Kitt Peak	M. W. Buie	NYS	770 m	MPC · JPL
483441	2001 SK_{104}	—	September 20, 2001	Socorro	LINEAR	·	1.4 km	MPC · JPL
483442	2001 SY_{142}	—	September 16, 2001	Socorro	LINEAR	·	1.1 km	MPC · JPL
483443	2001 SX_{255}	—	September 19, 2001	Socorro	LINEAR	PHO	670 m	MPC · JPL
483444	2001 SC_{342}	—	September 21, 2001	Socorro	LINEAR	·	990 m	MPC · JPL
483445	2001 TH_{25}	—	September 12, 2001	Kitt Peak	Spacewatch	·	1.1 km	MPC · JPL
483446	2001 TG_{127}	—	September 12, 2001	Kitt Peak	Spacewatch	·	790 m	MPC · JPL
483447	2001 TT_{140}	—	October 10, 2001	Palomar	NEAT	·	790 m	MPC · JPL
483448	2001 UX_{37}	—	September 21, 2001	Socorro	LINEAR	·	1.0 km	MPC · JPL
483449	2001 UR_{106}	—	October 20, 2001	Socorro	LINEAR	·	910 m	MPC · JPL
483450	2001 VR_{83}	—	November 10, 2001	Socorro	LINEAR	·	1.1 km	MPC · JPL
483451	2001 WU_{35}	—	November 17, 2001	Socorro	LINEAR	·	1.2 km	MPC · JPL
483452	2001 XZ_{182}	—	December 14, 2001	Socorro	LINEAR	·	880 m	MPC · JPL
483453	2002 AN_{11}	—	January 8, 2002	Socorro	LINEAR	AMO	740 m	MPC · JPL
483454 Hosszúkatinka	2002 AF_{17}	Hosszúkatinka	January 13, 2002	Piszkéstető	K. Sárneczky, Z. Heiner	MAS	550 m	MPC · JPL
483455	2002 CQ_{234}	—	February 8, 2002	Kitt Peak	Spacewatch	MAS	640 m	MPC · JPL
483456	2002 CG_{268}	—	February 7, 2002	Palomar	NEAT	·	990 m	MPC · JPL
483457	2002 CW_{295}	—	February 10, 2002	Socorro	LINEAR	·	1.1 km	MPC · JPL
483458	2002 DC_{1}	—	February 17, 2002	Bohyunsan	Bohyunsan	MAS	590 m	MPC · JPL
483459	2002 EM_{6}	—	March 12, 2002	Socorro	LINEAR	APO	310 m	MPC · JPL
483460	2002 EO_{65}	—	March 13, 2002	Socorro	LINEAR	·	1.4 km	MPC · JPL
483461	2002 ES_{106}	—	March 9, 2002	Anderson Mesa	LONEOS	·	3.9 km	MPC · JPL
483462	2002 FH_{8}	—	March 16, 2002	Socorro	LINEAR	·	1.1 km	MPC · JPL
483463	2002 FE_{24}	—	March 18, 2002	Socorro	LINEAR	ERI	1.7 km	MPC · JPL
483464	2002 FP_{41}	—	March 20, 2002	Kitt Peak	Spacewatch	·	1.0 km	MPC · JPL
483465	2002 GQ_{38}	—	April 2, 2002	Kitt Peak	Spacewatch	·	2.1 km	MPC · JPL
483466	2002 GF_{98}	—	April 10, 2002	Socorro	LINEAR	NYS	1.1 km	MPC · JPL
483467	2002 GA_{123}	—	April 10, 2002	Socorro	LINEAR	·	1.3 km	MPC · JPL
483468	2002 JY_{8}	—	May 4, 2002	Socorro	LINEAR	APO +1km	880 m	MPC · JPL
483469	2002 JT_{22}	—	May 8, 2002	Socorro	LINEAR	·	1.7 km	MPC · JPL
483470	2002 JR_{145}	—	May 14, 2002	Palomar	NEAT	H	490 m	MPC · JPL
483471	2002 LS_{32}	—	June 10, 2002	Palomar	NEAT	APO	770 m	MPC · JPL
483472	2002 NX	—	July 5, 2002	Palomar	NEAT	APO	500 m	MPC · JPL
483473	2002 NT_{5}	—	July 10, 2002	Campo Imperatore	CINEOS	·	3.0 km	MPC · JPL
483474	2002 NQ_{62}	—	July 14, 2002	Palomar	NEAT	·	970 m	MPC · JPL
483475	2002 NP_{77}	—	July 9, 2002	Palomar	NEAT	MAR	1.4 km	MPC · JPL
483476	2002 PL_{139}	—	August 12, 2002	Haleakala	NEAT	EUN	1.4 km	MPC · JPL
483477	2002 PJ_{140}	—	August 14, 2002	Socorro	LINEAR	(1547)	1.8 km	MPC · JPL
483478	2002 PE_{142}	—	August 11, 2002	Socorro	LINEAR	·	1.7 km	MPC · JPL
483479	2002 PA_{191}	—	August 15, 2002	Palomar	NEAT	H	410 m	MPC · JPL
483480	2002 PF_{191}	—	August 13, 2002	Palomar	NEAT	·	3.2 km	MPC · JPL
483481	2002 QQ_{30}	—	August 29, 2002	Palomar	NEAT	(5)	930 m	MPC · JPL
483482	2002 RM_{22}	—	September 4, 2002	Anderson Mesa	LONEOS	EUN	1.2 km	MPC · JPL
483483	2002 RR_{28}	—	September 6, 2002	Socorro	LINEAR	·	1.7 km	MPC · JPL
483484	2002 RJ_{79}	—	September 5, 2002	Socorro	LINEAR	·	550 m	MPC · JPL
483485	2002 RZ_{137}	—	September 13, 2002	Palomar	NEAT	H	430 m	MPC · JPL
483486	2002 RU_{210}	—	September 15, 2002	Kitt Peak	Spacewatch	·	550 m	MPC · JPL
483487	2002 RU_{243}	—	September 14, 2002	Palomar	NEAT	·	1.2 km	MPC · JPL
483488 Wudeshi	2002 RF_{257}	Wudeshi	September 4, 2002	Palomar	NEAT	·	570 m	MPC · JPL
483489	2002 SH_{8}	—	August 13, 2002	Kitt Peak	Spacewatch	·	530 m	MPC · JPL
483490	2002 SJ_{69}	—	September 29, 2002	Haleakala	NEAT	·	1.3 km	MPC · JPL
483491	2002 TB_{18}	—	October 2, 2002	Socorro	LINEAR	·	660 m	MPC · JPL
483492	2002 TA_{55}	—	October 2, 2002	Haleakala	NEAT	·	1.7 km	MPC · JPL
483493	2002 TY_{188}	—	October 4, 2002	Socorro	LINEAR	·	620 m	MPC · JPL
483494	2002 TA_{197}	—	October 4, 2002	Socorro	LINEAR	·	1.8 km	MPC · JPL
483495	2002 TK_{295}	—	October 5, 2002	Socorro	LINEAR	·	800 m	MPC · JPL
483496	2002 TG_{298}	—	October 12, 2002	Socorro	LINEAR	·	790 m	MPC · JPL
483497	2002 TC_{378}	—	October 9, 2002	Palomar	NEAT	·	1.5 km	MPC · JPL
483498	2002 UL_{3}	—	October 28, 2002	Socorro	LINEAR	·	2.4 km	MPC · JPL
483499	2002 VM_{14}	—	November 6, 2002	Socorro	LINEAR	H	680 m	MPC · JPL
483500	2002 VX_{42}	—	November 4, 2002	Palomar	NEAT	·	680 m	MPC · JPL

== 483501–483600 ==
back to top

Designation			Discovery			Properties		Ref
Permanent	Provisional	Named after	Date	Site	Discoverer(s)	Category	Diam.	Ref
483501	2002 VN_{54}	—	November 6, 2002	Anderson Mesa	LONEOS	·	1.9 km	MPC · JPL
483502	2002 VF_{98}	—	November 11, 2002	Socorro	LINEAR	·	780 m	MPC · JPL
483503	2002 WH_{29}	—	November 22, 2002	Palomar	NEAT	H	510 m	MPC · JPL
483504	2002 XN_{14}	—	December 5, 2002	Socorro	LINEAR	APO	320 m	MPC · JPL
483505	2002 XD_{31}	—	December 6, 2002	Socorro	LINEAR	·	1.5 km	MPC · JPL
483506	2002 XU_{66}	—	December 12, 2002	Socorro	LINEAR	AMO	750 m	MPC · JPL
483507	2003 AH_{9}	—	January 4, 2003	Socorro	LINEAR	·	920 m	MPC · JPL
483508	2003 CR_{1}	—	February 2, 2003	Socorro	LINEAR	APO · PHA	200 m	MPC · JPL
483509	2003 CH_{11}	—	February 4, 2003	Anderson Mesa	LONEOS	AMO	450 m	MPC · JPL
483510	2003 DN_{22}	—	February 2, 2003	Anderson Mesa	LONEOS	·	2.0 km	MPC · JPL
483511	2003 FA_{17}	—	March 24, 2003	Kitt Peak	Spacewatch	·	1.1 km	MPC · JPL
483512	2003 FT_{35}	—	March 23, 2003	Kitt Peak	Spacewatch	·	920 m	MPC · JPL
483513	2003 FD_{37}	—	March 23, 2003	Kitt Peak	Spacewatch	·	1.3 km	MPC · JPL
483514	2003 FF_{115}	—	March 31, 2003	Anderson Mesa	LONEOS	H	760 m	MPC · JPL
483515	2003 FV_{132}	—	March 23, 2003	Apache Point	SDSS	·	660 m	MPC · JPL
483516	2003 PE_{12}	—	August 7, 2003	Pla D'Arguines	R. Ferrando	·	1.7 km	MPC · JPL
483517	2003 PH_{12}	—	August 11, 2003	Haleakala	NEAT	·	2.2 km	MPC · JPL
483518	2003 QD_{25}	—	August 22, 2003	Palomar	NEAT	·	1.2 km	MPC · JPL
483519	2003 QV_{74}	—	August 24, 2003	Socorro	LINEAR	·	3.8 km	MPC · JPL
483520	2003 SC_{5}	—	September 16, 2003	Kitt Peak	Spacewatch	(5)	800 m	MPC · JPL
483521	2003 SO_{30}	—	September 18, 2003	Kitt Peak	Spacewatch	·	1.1 km	MPC · JPL
483522	2003 SE_{64}	—	September 17, 2003	Campo Imperatore	CINEOS	(5)	1.2 km	MPC · JPL
483523	2003 SR_{100}	—	September 20, 2003	Palomar	NEAT	·	1.3 km	MPC · JPL
483524	2003 SN_{158}	—	September 23, 2003	Palomar	NEAT	·	1.1 km	MPC · JPL
483525	2003 SB_{227}	—	September 16, 2003	Kitt Peak	Spacewatch	·	3.2 km	MPC · JPL
483526	2003 SC_{330}	—	September 26, 2003	Apache Point	SDSS	·	2.3 km	MPC · JPL
483527	2003 ST_{344}	—	September 18, 2003	Kitt Peak	Spacewatch	·	2.4 km	MPC · JPL
483528	2003 SE_{356}	—	September 18, 2003	Kitt Peak	Spacewatch	·	1.1 km	MPC · JPL
483529	2003 TA_{26}	—	October 1, 2003	Kitt Peak	Spacewatch	(5)	900 m	MPC · JPL
483530	2003 TH_{46}	—	October 3, 2003	Kitt Peak	Spacewatch	·	2.5 km	MPC · JPL
483531	2003 UF_{22}	—	October 23, 2003	Socorro	LINEAR	AMO	330 m	MPC · JPL
483532	2003 UO_{23}	—	October 22, 2003	Kitt Peak	Spacewatch	·	1.9 km	MPC · JPL
483533	2003 UQ_{24}	—	October 23, 2003	Socorro	LINEAR	·	2.4 km	MPC · JPL
483534	2003 UQ_{49}	—	October 16, 2003	Palomar	NEAT	·	1.7 km	MPC · JPL
483535	2003 UM_{86}	—	October 18, 2003	Palomar	NEAT	·	740 m	MPC · JPL
483536	2003 UD_{148}	—	October 19, 2003	Kitt Peak	Spacewatch	·	960 m	MPC · JPL
483537	2003 UP_{172}	—	October 20, 2003	Socorro	LINEAR	·	1.3 km	MPC · JPL
483538	2003 UR_{231}	—	September 18, 2003	Kitt Peak	Spacewatch	·	3.5 km	MPC · JPL
483539	2003 UY_{258}	—	October 25, 2003	Socorro	LINEAR	·	1.1 km	MPC · JPL
483540	2003 UD_{275}	—	October 29, 2003	Socorro	LINEAR	·	850 m	MPC · JPL
483541	2003 UN_{315}	—	October 18, 2003	Anderson Mesa	LONEOS	·	1.4 km	MPC · JPL
483542	2003 UG_{362}	—	October 20, 2003	Kitt Peak	Spacewatch	(5)	950 m	MPC · JPL
483543	2003 VF_{11}	—	November 15, 2003	Palomar	NEAT	·	1.4 km	MPC · JPL
483544	2003 WG_{7}	—	November 18, 2003	Kitt Peak	Spacewatch	H	600 m	MPC · JPL
483545	2003 WW_{9}	—	November 18, 2003	Kitt Peak	Spacewatch	·	1.0 km	MPC · JPL
483546	2003 WW_{13}	—	November 16, 2003	Kitt Peak	Spacewatch	MAR	950 m	MPC · JPL
483547	2003 WM_{25}	—	November 20, 2003	Socorro	LINEAR	AMO +1km	1.1 km	MPC · JPL
483548	2003 WR_{59}	—	November 18, 2003	Kitt Peak	Spacewatch	EUN	1.0 km	MPC · JPL
483549	2003 WA_{70}	—	November 19, 2003	Campo Imperatore	CINEOS	·	900 m	MPC · JPL
483550	2003 WT_{175}	—	November 19, 2003	Kitt Peak	Spacewatch	(5)	800 m	MPC · JPL
483551	2003 XO_{14}	—	December 3, 2003	Anderson Mesa	LONEOS	H	560 m	MPC · JPL
483552	2003 XR_{15}	—	December 3, 2003	Socorro	LINEAR	H	630 m	MPC · JPL
483553	2003 XE_{24}	—	November 24, 2003	Kitt Peak	Spacewatch	·	1.2 km	MPC · JPL
483554	2003 YD_{8}	—	November 19, 2003	Socorro	LINEAR	H	520 m	MPC · JPL
483555	2003 YP_{10}	—	December 17, 2003	Socorro	LINEAR	·	1.6 km	MPC · JPL
483556	2003 YW_{18}	—	December 17, 2003	Kitt Peak	Spacewatch	·	1.4 km	MPC · JPL
483557	2003 YO_{94}	—	December 22, 2003	Socorro	LINEAR	H	580 m	MPC · JPL
483558	2003 YD_{108}	—	December 22, 2003	Kitt Peak	Spacewatch	·	1.9 km	MPC · JPL
483559	2004 AC_{24}	—	December 28, 2003	Kitt Peak	Spacewatch	·	1.3 km	MPC · JPL
483560	2004 BV_{1}	—	January 16, 2004	Kitt Peak	Spacewatch	APO · PHA	500 m	MPC · JPL
483561	2004 BO_{24}	—	January 19, 2004	Sandlot	G. Hug	·	1.4 km	MPC · JPL
483562	2004 BB_{27}	—	January 21, 2004	Socorro	LINEAR	H	470 m	MPC · JPL
483563	2004 BD_{68}	—	January 26, 2004	Anderson Mesa	LONEOS	APO	650 m	MPC · JPL
483564	2004 BJ_{79}	—	December 29, 2003	Kitt Peak	Spacewatch	·	1.7 km	MPC · JPL
483565	2004 BX_{79}	—	December 29, 2003	Kitt Peak	Spacewatch	·	1.5 km	MPC · JPL
483566	2004 BE_{85}	—	January 28, 2004	Socorro	LINEAR	AMO +1km	920 m	MPC · JPL
483567	2004 CG_{7}	—	February 10, 2004	Palomar	NEAT	·	3.2 km	MPC · JPL
483568	2004 CC_{15}	—	January 31, 2004	Kitt Peak	Spacewatch	·	550 m	MPC · JPL
483569	2004 CZ_{23}	—	February 12, 2004	Kitt Peak	Spacewatch	H	600 m	MPC · JPL
483570	2004 CL_{52}	—	February 15, 2004	Socorro	LINEAR	H	600 m	MPC · JPL
483571	2004 DU_{1}	—	February 18, 2004	Socorro	LINEAR	H	490 m	MPC · JPL
483572	2004 DJ_{57}	—	December 29, 2003	Kitt Peak	Spacewatch	·	1.1 km	MPC · JPL
483573	2004 DD_{64}	—	February 16, 2004	Socorro	LINEAR	H	520 m	MPC · JPL
483574	2004 EQ_{9}	—	March 15, 2004	Kitt Peak	Spacewatch	H	580 m	MPC · JPL
483575	2004 EW_{10}	—	March 15, 2004	Catalina	CSS	·	1.2 km	MPC · JPL
483576	2004 ER_{23}	—	March 15, 2004	Socorro	LINEAR	H	510 m	MPC · JPL
483577	2004 ES_{33}	—	March 15, 2004	Kitt Peak	Spacewatch	H	480 m	MPC · JPL
483578	2004 EY_{65}	—	February 16, 2004	Socorro	LINEAR	·	1.4 km	MPC · JPL
483579	2004 ET_{77}	—	February 23, 2004	Socorro	LINEAR	·	2.0 km	MPC · JPL
483580	2004 EP_{78}	—	February 26, 2004	Socorro	LINEAR	·	1.4 km	MPC · JPL
483581	2004 FX_{4}	—	March 17, 2004	Socorro	LINEAR	H	660 m	MPC · JPL
483582	2004 FX_{5}	—	March 22, 2004	Socorro	LINEAR	H	510 m	MPC · JPL
483583	2004 FO_{48}	—	March 15, 2004	Kitt Peak	Spacewatch	·	1.5 km	MPC · JPL
483584	2004 FY_{63}	—	March 19, 2004	Socorro	LINEAR	·	2.1 km	MPC · JPL
483585	2004 FK_{106}	—	March 19, 2004	Socorro	LINEAR	H	550 m	MPC · JPL
483586	2004 FK_{115}	—	February 24, 2004	Bergisch Gladbach	W. Bickel	·	1.5 km	MPC · JPL
483587	2004 FL_{135}	—	March 27, 2004	Socorro	LINEAR	·	1.6 km	MPC · JPL
483588	2004 FY_{141}	—	March 27, 2004	Socorro	LINEAR	·	1.7 km	MPC · JPL
483589	2004 GB_{77}	—	April 15, 2004	Socorro	LINEAR	·	1.8 km	MPC · JPL
483590	2004 JE_{5}	—	May 12, 2004	Reedy Creek	J. Broughton	·	800 m	MPC · JPL
483591	2004 JZ_{31}	—	May 15, 2004	Socorro	LINEAR	·	290 m	MPC · JPL
483592	2004 MY_{3}	—	June 22, 2004	Wrightwood	J. W. Young	·	1.1 km	MPC · JPL
483593	2004 MA_{6}	—	June 23, 2004	Siding Spring	SSS	·	2.1 km	MPC · JPL
483594	2004 PT_{8}	—	August 6, 2004	Palomar	NEAT	·	900 m	MPC · JPL
483595	2004 PB_{16}	—	August 7, 2004	Palomar	NEAT	·	1.4 km	MPC · JPL
483596	2004 PY_{32}	—	August 8, 2004	Socorro	LINEAR	·	1.2 km	MPC · JPL
483597	2004 PM_{47}	—	August 8, 2004	Socorro	LINEAR	·	1.3 km	MPC · JPL
483598	2004 PO_{96}	—	August 11, 2004	Campo Imperatore	CINEOS	·	850 m	MPC · JPL
483599	2004 PT_{106}	—	August 15, 2004	Campo Imperatore	CINEOS	·	2.7 km	MPC · JPL
483600	2004 QM_{6}	—	August 10, 2004	Socorro	LINEAR	·	2.6 km	MPC · JPL

== 483601–483700 ==
back to top

Designation			Discovery			Properties		Ref
Permanent	Provisional	Named after	Date	Site	Discoverer(s)	Category	Diam.	Ref
483601	2004 RZ_{32}	—	September 7, 2004	Kitt Peak	Spacewatch	NYS	940 m	MPC · JPL
483602	2004 RC_{34}	—	September 7, 2004	Socorro	LINEAR	NYS	1.2 km	MPC · JPL
483603	2004 RR_{77}	—	July 22, 2004	Siding Spring	SSS	·	1.2 km	MPC · JPL
483604	2004 RO_{97}	—	September 8, 2004	Socorro	LINEAR	·	1 km	MPC · JPL
483605	2004 RY_{100}	—	September 6, 2004	Tucson	R. A. Tucker	·	2.6 km	MPC · JPL
483606	2004 RL_{101}	—	September 7, 2004	Tucson	R. A. Tucker	·	1.4 km	MPC · JPL
483607	2004 RL_{147}	—	September 9, 2004	Socorro	LINEAR	·	2.1 km	MPC · JPL
483608	2004 RR_{174}	—	September 10, 2004	Socorro	LINEAR	·	2.5 km	MPC · JPL
483609	2004 RG_{210}	—	July 15, 2004	Socorro	LINEAR	PHO	1.5 km	MPC · JPL
483610	2004 RH_{248}	—	September 12, 2004	Socorro	LINEAR	·	3.3 km	MPC · JPL
483611	2004 RF_{256}	—	September 7, 2004	Socorro	LINEAR	·	1.2 km	MPC · JPL
483612	2004 RN_{270}	—	September 11, 2004	Kitt Peak	Spacewatch	EOS	1.3 km	MPC · JPL
483613	2004 RK_{303}	—	September 12, 2004	Kitt Peak	Spacewatch	·	1.9 km	MPC · JPL
483614	2004 SU_{30}	—	August 26, 2004	Catalina	CSS	·	3.2 km	MPC · JPL
483615 Martinmccarthy	2004 SP_{41}	Martinmccarthy	September 18, 2004	Moletai	K. Černis, J. Zdanavičius	EOS	2.0 km	MPC · JPL
483616	2004 TG_{16}	—	October 10, 2004	Kitt Peak	Spacewatch	·	1.2 km	MPC · JPL
483617	2004 TJ_{58}	—	October 5, 2004	Kitt Peak	Spacewatch	·	2.1 km	MPC · JPL
483618	2004 TR_{76}	—	September 23, 2004	Kitt Peak	Spacewatch	THM	1.6 km	MPC · JPL
483619	2004 TK_{91}	—	October 5, 2004	Kitt Peak	Spacewatch	·	1.8 km	MPC · JPL
483620	2004 TF_{108}	—	October 7, 2004	Socorro	LINEAR	·	3.1 km	MPC · JPL
483621	2004 TN_{132}	—	September 18, 2004	Socorro	LINEAR	·	2.3 km	MPC · JPL
483622	2004 TZ_{141}	—	October 4, 2004	Kitt Peak	Spacewatch	·	2.5 km	MPC · JPL
483623	2004 TJ_{190}	—	October 7, 2004	Kitt Peak	Spacewatch	·	1.1 km	MPC · JPL
483624	2004 TX_{192}	—	October 7, 2004	Kitt Peak	Spacewatch	MAS	660 m	MPC · JPL
483625	2004 TT_{200}	—	October 7, 2004	Kitt Peak	Spacewatch	NYS	1.1 km	MPC · JPL
483626	2004 TH_{206}	—	October 7, 2004	Kitt Peak	Spacewatch	NYS	1.2 km	MPC · JPL
483627	2004 TX_{209}	—	October 8, 2004	Kitt Peak	Spacewatch	EOS	1.8 km	MPC · JPL
483628	2004 TS_{227}	—	September 7, 2004	Kitt Peak	Spacewatch	·	2.4 km	MPC · JPL
483629	2004 TL_{241}	—	September 13, 2004	Socorro	LINEAR	·	3.0 km	MPC · JPL
483630	2004 TE_{249}	—	October 7, 2004	Kitt Peak	Spacewatch	·	2.7 km	MPC · JPL
483631	2004 TG_{266}	—	October 9, 2004	Kitt Peak	Spacewatch	MAS	600 m	MPC · JPL
483632	2004 TB_{271}	—	October 9, 2004	Kitt Peak	Spacewatch	·	2.9 km	MPC · JPL
483633	2004 TK_{290}	—	September 23, 2004	Kitt Peak	Spacewatch	·	2.3 km	MPC · JPL
483634	2004 TS_{300}	—	October 8, 2004	Socorro	LINEAR	·	2.6 km	MPC · JPL
483635	2004 TQ_{328}	—	October 4, 2004	Palomar	NEAT	·	3.4 km	MPC · JPL
483636 Treanor	2004 TJ_{347}	Treanor	October 11, 2004	Moletai	K. Černis, J. Zdanavičius	·	1.1 km	MPC · JPL
483637 Johanstein	2004 TM_{347}	Johanstein	October 12, 2004	Moletai	K. Černis, J. Zdanavičius	·	3.3 km	MPC · JPL
483638	2004 UM_{5}	—	October 18, 2004	Kitt Peak	M. W. Buie	THM	2.1 km	MPC · JPL
483639	2004 VA_{31}	—	October 7, 2004	Kitt Peak	Spacewatch	·	2.3 km	MPC · JPL
483640	2004 VE_{39}	—	November 4, 2004	Kitt Peak	Spacewatch	(159)	2.5 km	MPC · JPL
483641	2004 VW_{39}	—	November 4, 2004	Kitt Peak	Spacewatch	·	2.5 km	MPC · JPL
483642	2004 VJ_{74}	—	November 12, 2004	Catalina	CSS	·	4.7 km	MPC · JPL
483643	2004 VX_{95}	—	November 11, 2004	Kitt Peak	Spacewatch	·	3.1 km	MPC · JPL
483644	2004 XU_{32}	—	December 10, 2004	Socorro	LINEAR	·	1.2 km	MPC · JPL
483645	2004 XJ_{37}	—	November 11, 2004	Kitt Peak	Spacewatch	·	2.3 km	MPC · JPL
483646	2004 XX_{73}	—	December 7, 2004	Socorro	LINEAR	·	3.6 km	MPC · JPL
483647	2004 XN_{125}	—	December 11, 2004	Catalina	CSS	·	2.2 km	MPC · JPL
483648	2004 YA_{2}	—	December 16, 2004	Kitt Peak	Spacewatch	·	3.8 km	MPC · JPL
483649	2004 YL_{16}	—	December 19, 2004	Mount Lemmon	Mount Lemmon Survey	L5	10 km	MPC · JPL
483650	2005 AG_{10}	—	January 7, 2005	Pla D'Arguines	R. Ferrando	·	3.2 km	MPC · JPL
483651	2005 AF_{42}	—	January 7, 2005	Catalina	CSS	·	2.0 km	MPC · JPL
483652	2005 CZ_{37}	—	February 8, 2005	La Silla	Vuissoz, C., Behrend, R.	L5	10 km	MPC · JPL
483653	2005 CJ_{61}	—	February 9, 2005	Mount Lemmon	Mount Lemmon Survey	·	3.6 km	MPC · JPL
483654	2005 EG_{33}	—	March 4, 2005	Catalina	CSS	·	1.2 km	MPC · JPL
483655	2005 EH_{40}	—	February 14, 2005	Kitt Peak	Spacewatch	·	1.7 km	MPC · JPL
483656	2005 ES_{70}	—	March 9, 2005	Catalina	CSS	ATE · fast	60 m	MPC · JPL
483657	2005 EP_{99}	—	March 3, 2005	Catalina	CSS	·	2.0 km	MPC · JPL
483658	2005 EQ_{116}	—	March 4, 2005	Mount Lemmon	Mount Lemmon Survey	·	940 m	MPC · JPL
483659	2005 EO_{137}	—	March 9, 2005	Socorro	LINEAR	·	1.1 km	MPC · JPL
483660	2005 EM_{203}	—	March 11, 2005	Kitt Peak	Spacewatch	·	1.0 km	MPC · JPL
483661	2005 ED_{213}	—	March 4, 2005	Mount Lemmon	Mount Lemmon Survey	·	960 m	MPC · JPL
483662	2005 EY_{223}	—	March 13, 2005	Socorro	LINEAR	AMO	480 m	MPC · JPL
483663	2005 EM_{245}	—	March 12, 2005	Kitt Peak	Spacewatch	·	1.8 km	MPC · JPL
483664	2005 ES_{272}	—	February 2, 2005	Kitt Peak	Spacewatch	L5	10 km	MPC · JPL
483665	2005 GL_{8}	—	April 2, 2005	Hormersdorf	Lorenz, J.	·	1.7 km	MPC · JPL
483666	2005 GK_{30}	—	April 4, 2005	Catalina	CSS	·	1.1 km	MPC · JPL
483667	2005 GT_{69}	—	April 4, 2005	Kitt Peak	Spacewatch	CYB	2.6 km	MPC · JPL
483668	2005 GH_{97}	—	April 7, 2005	Campo Catino	Campo Catino Austral Observatory Survey	T_{j} (2.95) · CYB	2.8 km	MPC · JPL
483669	2005 GZ_{150}	—	April 11, 2005	Kitt Peak	Spacewatch	·	940 m	MPC · JPL
483670	2005 JH_{6}	—	May 4, 2005	Mauna Kea	Veillet, C.	MAR	760 m	MPC · JPL
483671	2005 JW_{36}	—	May 4, 2005	Kitt Peak	Spacewatch	·	1.6 km	MPC · JPL
483672	2005 JJ_{99}	—	May 9, 2005	Kitt Peak	Spacewatch	·	1.1 km	MPC · JPL
483673	2005 JS_{100}	—	May 9, 2005	Anderson Mesa	LONEOS	·	1.7 km	MPC · JPL
483674	2005 JL_{122}	—	May 11, 2005	Kitt Peak	Spacewatch	·	960 m	MPC · JPL
483675	2005 JD_{123}	—	May 11, 2005	Kitt Peak	Spacewatch	RAF	770 m	MPC · JPL
483676	2005 MR_{13}	—	June 16, 2005	Kitt Peak	Spacewatch	·	1.4 km	MPC · JPL
483677	2005 MC_{25}	—	June 13, 2005	Mount Lemmon	Mount Lemmon Survey	·	1.1 km	MPC · JPL
483678	2005 MM_{38}	—	June 18, 2005	Mount Lemmon	Mount Lemmon Survey	·	2.1 km	MPC · JPL
483679	2005 NV_{1}	—	July 1, 2005	Anderson Mesa	LONEOS	PHO	1.0 km	MPC · JPL
483680	2005 NM_{2}	—	July 2, 2005	Kitt Peak	Spacewatch	·	1.0 km	MPC · JPL
483681	2005 NV_{3}	—	June 13, 2005	Mount Lemmon	Mount Lemmon Survey	·	650 m	MPC · JPL
483682	2005 NN_{37}	—	July 6, 2005	Kitt Peak	Spacewatch	H	530 m	MPC · JPL
483683	2005 NW_{57}	—	June 18, 2005	Mount Lemmon	Mount Lemmon Survey	·	1.6 km	MPC · JPL
483684	2005 NS_{63}	—	July 1, 2005	Palomar	NEAT	H	460 m	MPC · JPL
483685	2005 NN_{69}	—	June 18, 2005	Mount Lemmon	Mount Lemmon Survey	·	790 m	MPC · JPL
483686	2005 ND_{102}	—	July 11, 2005	Anderson Mesa	LONEOS	·	2.0 km	MPC · JPL
483687	2005 NF_{125}	—	July 1, 2005	Kitt Peak	Spacewatch	·	1.9 km	MPC · JPL
483688	2005 OT_{6}	—	July 28, 2005	Palomar	NEAT	(18466)	2.7 km	MPC · JPL
483689	2005 OH_{17}	—	July 30, 2005	Palomar	NEAT	·	2.4 km	MPC · JPL
483690	2005 QN_{75}	—	August 29, 2005	Begues	Begues	·	630 m	MPC · JPL
483691	2005 QV_{133}	—	August 28, 2005	Kitt Peak	Spacewatch	KOR	1.3 km	MPC · JPL
483692	2005 QF_{134}	—	August 28, 2005	Kitt Peak	Spacewatch	(1547)	1.8 km	MPC · JPL
483693	2005 QF_{151}	—	August 30, 2005	Kitt Peak	Spacewatch	·	2.1 km	MPC · JPL
483694	2005 QS_{155}	—	August 30, 2005	Socorro	LINEAR	·	1.9 km	MPC · JPL
483695	2005 QW_{159}	—	August 28, 2005	Anderson Mesa	LONEOS	·	1.9 km	MPC · JPL
483696	2005 RR_{9}	—	September 8, 2005	Socorro	LINEAR	·	2.2 km	MPC · JPL
483697	2005 RQ_{32}	—	September 13, 2005	Catalina	CSS	H	600 m	MPC · JPL
483698	2005 RP_{46}	—	September 14, 2005	Apache Point	A. C. Becker	·	1.7 km	MPC · JPL
483699	2005 SU_{43}	—	September 24, 2005	Kitt Peak	Spacewatch	·	600 m	MPC · JPL
483700	2005 SX_{59}	—	September 26, 2005	Kitt Peak	Spacewatch	·	590 m	MPC · JPL

== 483701–483800 ==
back to top

Designation			Discovery			Properties		Ref
Permanent	Provisional	Named after	Date	Site	Discoverer(s)	Category	Diam.	Ref
483701	2005 SN_{64}	—	September 26, 2005	Kitt Peak	Spacewatch	·	640 m	MPC · JPL
483702	2005 ST_{64}	—	August 29, 2005	Anderson Mesa	LONEOS	·	800 m	MPC · JPL
483703	2005 SA_{76}	—	September 14, 2005	Kitt Peak	Spacewatch	·	600 m	MPC · JPL
483704	2005 SO_{95}	—	September 25, 2005	Kitt Peak	Spacewatch	·	2.8 km	MPC · JPL
483705	2005 SS_{113}	—	September 27, 2005	Kitt Peak	Spacewatch	·	600 m	MPC · JPL
483706	2005 SW_{113}	—	September 27, 2005	Kitt Peak	Spacewatch	·	1.5 km	MPC · JPL
483707	2005 SG_{131}	—	September 29, 2005	Kitt Peak	Spacewatch	(2076)	680 m	MPC · JPL
483708	2005 SL_{143}	—	September 25, 2005	Kitt Peak	Spacewatch	·	1.7 km	MPC · JPL
483709	2005 SH_{156}	—	September 26, 2005	Kitt Peak	Spacewatch	·	1.9 km	MPC · JPL
483710	2005 SV_{191}	—	September 29, 2005	Mount Lemmon	Mount Lemmon Survey	·	670 m	MPC · JPL
483711	2005 SC_{222}	—	September 14, 2005	Catalina	CSS	·	2.1 km	MPC · JPL
483712	2005 SJ_{237}	—	September 29, 2005	Kitt Peak	Spacewatch	·	860 m	MPC · JPL
483713	2005 SS_{249}	—	September 23, 2005	Catalina	CSS	·	820 m	MPC · JPL
483714	2005 TJ_{4}	—	October 1, 2005	Mount Lemmon	Mount Lemmon Survey	·	570 m	MPC · JPL
483715	2005 TN_{14}	—	September 3, 2005	Catalina	CSS	·	810 m	MPC · JPL
483716	2005 TH_{24}	—	October 1, 2005	Mount Lemmon	Mount Lemmon Survey	H	490 m	MPC · JPL
483717	2005 TO_{24}	—	October 1, 2005	Mount Lemmon	Mount Lemmon Survey	·	530 m	MPC · JPL
483718	2005 TQ_{26}	—	October 1, 2005	Mount Lemmon	Mount Lemmon Survey	·	760 m	MPC · JPL
483719	2005 TV_{54}	—	October 4, 2005	Mount Lemmon	Mount Lemmon Survey	·	720 m	MPC · JPL
483720	2005 TG_{66}	—	October 3, 2005	Catalina	CSS	·	600 m	MPC · JPL
483721	2005 TF_{82}	—	October 3, 2005	Kitt Peak	Spacewatch	·	700 m	MPC · JPL
483722	2005 TL_{87}	—	October 5, 2005	Kitt Peak	Spacewatch	KOR	1.0 km	MPC · JPL
483723	2005 TZ_{89}	—	August 30, 2005	Kitt Peak	Spacewatch	·	1.0 km	MPC · JPL
483724	2005 TC_{91}	—	September 24, 2005	Kitt Peak	Spacewatch	·	690 m	MPC · JPL
483725	2005 TX_{95}	—	October 6, 2005	Mount Lemmon	Mount Lemmon Survey	·	1.7 km	MPC · JPL
483726	2005 TM_{105}	—	October 8, 2005	Anderson Mesa	LONEOS	·	960 m	MPC · JPL
483727	2005 TM_{111}	—	September 27, 2005	Kitt Peak	Spacewatch	·	680 m	MPC · JPL
483728	2005 TP_{134}	—	October 1, 2005	Kitt Peak	Spacewatch	·	540 m	MPC · JPL
483729	2005 TO_{136}	—	September 25, 2005	Kitt Peak	Spacewatch	·	540 m	MPC · JPL
483730	2005 TZ_{144}	—	October 8, 2005	Kitt Peak	Spacewatch	·	1.7 km	MPC · JPL
483731	2005 TW_{164}	—	October 6, 2005	Mount Lemmon	Mount Lemmon Survey	·	500 m	MPC · JPL
483732	2005 TY_{168}	—	October 9, 2005	Kitt Peak	Spacewatch	·	520 m	MPC · JPL
483733	2005 TM_{170}	—	October 11, 2005	Kitt Peak	Spacewatch	·	1.6 km	MPC · JPL
483734	2005 TC_{171}	—	October 8, 2005	Socorro	LINEAR	·	970 m	MPC · JPL
483735	2005 TO_{180}	—	October 1, 2005	Kitt Peak	Spacewatch	H	440 m	MPC · JPL
483736	2005 TL_{185}	—	October 2, 2005	Mount Lemmon	Mount Lemmon Survey	·	690 m	MPC · JPL
483737	2005 TS_{196}	—	October 6, 2005	Catalina	CSS	H	450 m	MPC · JPL
483738	2005 UX_{9}	—	October 7, 2005	Catalina	CSS	·	770 m	MPC · JPL
483739	2005 UC_{10}	—	October 21, 2005	Palomar	NEAT	·	840 m	MPC · JPL
483740	2005 UM_{14}	—	October 22, 2005	Kitt Peak	Spacewatch	PHO	710 m	MPC · JPL
483741	2005 UF_{21}	—	October 23, 2005	Kitt Peak	Spacewatch	·	580 m	MPC · JPL
483742	2005 UK_{25}	—	September 30, 2005	Mount Lemmon	Mount Lemmon Survey	·	660 m	MPC · JPL
483743	2005 UT_{34}	—	October 24, 2005	Kitt Peak	Spacewatch	·	740 m	MPC · JPL
483744	2005 UQ_{41}	—	October 27, 2005	Needville	J. Dellinger, D. Wells	·	820 m	MPC · JPL
483745	2005 UA_{57}	—	September 25, 2005	Kitt Peak	Spacewatch	H	590 m	MPC · JPL
483746	2005 UQ_{68}	—	September 26, 2005	Kitt Peak	Spacewatch	·	840 m	MPC · JPL
483747	2005 UG_{80}	—	September 29, 2005	Catalina	CSS	CYB	4.2 km	MPC · JPL
483748	2005 UD_{86}	—	October 22, 2005	Kitt Peak	Spacewatch	·	610 m	MPC · JPL
483749	2005 UF_{95}	—	October 22, 2005	Kitt Peak	Spacewatch	·	730 m	MPC · JPL
483750	2005 UJ_{126}	—	October 1, 2005	Mount Lemmon	Mount Lemmon Survey	·	690 m	MPC · JPL
483751	2005 UL_{128}	—	October 24, 2005	Kitt Peak	Spacewatch	·	720 m	MPC · JPL
483752	2005 UO_{130}	—	October 2, 2005	Anderson Mesa	LONEOS	·	1.2 km	MPC · JPL
483753	2005 UR_{130}	—	October 24, 2005	Kitt Peak	Spacewatch	NYS	800 m	MPC · JPL
483754	2005 UJ_{134}	—	October 25, 2005	Kitt Peak	Spacewatch	·	2.1 km	MPC · JPL
483755	2005 UB_{139}	—	October 1, 2005	Mount Lemmon	Mount Lemmon Survey	·	600 m	MPC · JPL
483756	2005 UT_{147}	—	October 26, 2005	Kitt Peak	Spacewatch	NYS	1.1 km	MPC · JPL
483757	2005 UQ_{154}	—	October 26, 2005	Kitt Peak	Spacewatch	·	590 m	MPC · JPL
483758	2005 UL_{166}	—	October 24, 2005	Kitt Peak	Spacewatch	·	730 m	MPC · JPL
483759	2005 UB_{168}	—	October 24, 2005	Kitt Peak	Spacewatch	·	670 m	MPC · JPL
483760	2005 UX_{170}	—	October 24, 2005	Kitt Peak	Spacewatch	·	750 m	MPC · JPL
483761	2005 UZ_{172}	—	October 24, 2005	Kitt Peak	Spacewatch	·	1.3 km	MPC · JPL
483762	2005 UD_{176}	—	October 24, 2005	Kitt Peak	Spacewatch	NYS	950 m	MPC · JPL
483763	2005 UD_{184}	—	October 25, 2005	Mount Lemmon	Mount Lemmon Survey	·	1.6 km	MPC · JPL
483764	2005 UU_{191}	—	October 27, 2005	Mount Lemmon	Mount Lemmon Survey	·	3.3 km	MPC · JPL
483765	2005 UB_{193}	—	October 1, 2005	Kitt Peak	Spacewatch	·	540 m	MPC · JPL
483766	2005 UX_{200}	—	October 25, 2005	Kitt Peak	Spacewatch	·	730 m	MPC · JPL
483767	2005 UW_{201}	—	October 25, 2005	Kitt Peak	Spacewatch	·	680 m	MPC · JPL
483768	2005 UT_{222}	—	October 25, 2005	Kitt Peak	Spacewatch	·	630 m	MPC · JPL
483769	2005 UE_{226}	—	October 25, 2005	Kitt Peak	Spacewatch	KOR	1.2 km	MPC · JPL
483770	2005 UO_{240}	—	October 25, 2005	Kitt Peak	Spacewatch	·	2.2 km	MPC · JPL
483771	2005 UF_{255}	—	September 29, 2005	Kitt Peak	Spacewatch	·	670 m	MPC · JPL
483772	2005 UU_{280}	—	September 30, 2005	Mount Lemmon	Mount Lemmon Survey	·	750 m	MPC · JPL
483773	2005 UE_{289}	—	October 26, 2005	Kitt Peak	Spacewatch	·	570 m	MPC · JPL
483774	2005 UJ_{291}	—	October 26, 2005	Kitt Peak	Spacewatch	·	1.2 km	MPC · JPL
483775	2005 UT_{301}	—	October 26, 2005	Kitt Peak	Spacewatch	·	740 m	MPC · JPL
483776	2005 UH_{307}	—	October 27, 2005	Mount Lemmon	Mount Lemmon Survey	·	750 m	MPC · JPL
483777	2005 UQ_{316}	—	October 25, 2005	Kitt Peak	Spacewatch	H	380 m	MPC · JPL
483778	2005 UU_{335}	—	October 30, 2005	Kitt Peak	Spacewatch	·	1.5 km	MPC · JPL
483779	2005 UZ_{346}	—	October 30, 2005	Kitt Peak	Spacewatch	·	620 m	MPC · JPL
483780	2005 UD_{381}	—	October 22, 2005	Kitt Peak	Spacewatch	·	1.2 km	MPC · JPL
483781	2005 UJ_{390}	—	October 1, 2005	Mount Lemmon	Mount Lemmon Survey	·	1.3 km	MPC · JPL
483782	2005 UV_{395}	—	October 23, 2005	Catalina	CSS	·	1.8 km	MPC · JPL
483783	2005 UK_{414}	—	October 25, 2005	Kitt Peak	Spacewatch	·	1.2 km	MPC · JPL
483784	2005 UF_{433}	—	October 28, 2005	Kitt Peak	Spacewatch	·	650 m	MPC · JPL
483785	2005 UT_{433}	—	October 28, 2005	Kitt Peak	Spacewatch	NYS	710 m	MPC · JPL
483786	2005 UY_{447}	—	October 23, 2005	Catalina	CSS	·	810 m	MPC · JPL
483787	2005 UM_{471}	—	October 30, 2005	Kitt Peak	Spacewatch	·	660 m	MPC · JPL
483788	2005 UJ_{479}	—	October 29, 2005	Kitt Peak	Spacewatch	·	1.4 km	MPC · JPL
483789	2005 UH_{523}	—	October 1, 2005	Mount Lemmon	Mount Lemmon Survey	3:2	4.5 km	MPC · JPL
483790	2005 VQ_{30}	—	November 4, 2005	Kitt Peak	Spacewatch	PHO	720 m	MPC · JPL
483791	2005 VX_{32}	—	November 4, 2005	Kitt Peak	Spacewatch	·	1.2 km	MPC · JPL
483792	2005 VO_{56}	—	October 25, 2005	Kitt Peak	Spacewatch	KOR	1.1 km	MPC · JPL
483793	2005 VR_{60}	—	November 5, 2005	Kitt Peak	Spacewatch	·	630 m	MPC · JPL
483794	2005 VL_{81}	—	November 5, 2005	Kitt Peak	Spacewatch	·	2.3 km	MPC · JPL
483795	2005 VJ_{82}	—	November 13, 2005	Socorro	LINEAR	·	1.2 km	MPC · JPL
483796	2005 VY_{96}	—	October 28, 2005	Kitt Peak	Spacewatch	·	1.7 km	MPC · JPL
483797	2005 VK_{97}	—	November 5, 2005	Kitt Peak	Spacewatch	·	3.1 km	MPC · JPL
483798	2005 VX_{102}	—	November 2, 2005	Mount Lemmon	Mount Lemmon Survey	·	700 m	MPC · JPL
483799	2005 VF_{125}	—	November 12, 2005	Kitt Peak	Spacewatch	·	670 m	MPC · JPL
483800	2005 WB_{9}	—	October 25, 2005	Mount Lemmon	Mount Lemmon Survey	·	690 m	MPC · JPL

== 483801–483900 ==
back to top

Designation			Discovery			Properties		Ref
Permanent	Provisional	Named after	Date	Site	Discoverer(s)	Category	Diam.	Ref
483801	2005 WL_{11}	—	November 22, 2005	Kitt Peak	Spacewatch	(2076)	740 m	MPC · JPL
483802	2005 WO_{13}	—	September 30, 2005	Mount Lemmon	Mount Lemmon Survey	NYS	830 m	MPC · JPL
483803	2005 WB_{36}	—	November 22, 2005	Kitt Peak	Spacewatch	·	850 m	MPC · JPL
483804	2005 WM_{36}	—	November 1, 2005	Mount Lemmon	Mount Lemmon Survey	·	760 m	MPC · JPL
483805	2005 WX_{53}	—	October 25, 2005	Mount Lemmon	Mount Lemmon Survey	·	1.0 km	MPC · JPL
483806	2005 WU_{54}	—	November 25, 2005	Kitt Peak	Spacewatch	·	1.1 km	MPC · JPL
483807	2005 WJ_{72}	—	November 25, 2005	Kitt Peak	Spacewatch	NYS	850 m	MPC · JPL
483808	2005 WO_{75}	—	November 25, 2005	Kitt Peak	Spacewatch	·	850 m	MPC · JPL
483809	2005 WA_{85}	—	November 5, 2005	Catalina	CSS	H	550 m	MPC · JPL
483810	2005 WT_{86}	—	November 28, 2005	Mount Lemmon	Mount Lemmon Survey	·	640 m	MPC · JPL
483811	2005 WW_{86}	—	October 1, 2005	Mount Lemmon	Mount Lemmon Survey	·	850 m	MPC · JPL
483812	2005 WW_{89}	—	November 10, 2005	Catalina	CSS	·	800 m	MPC · JPL
483813	2005 WR_{94}	—	November 26, 2005	Kitt Peak	Spacewatch	·	650 m	MPC · JPL
483814	2005 WK_{99}	—	November 28, 2005	Mount Lemmon	Mount Lemmon Survey	·	1.8 km	MPC · JPL
483815	2005 WW_{100}	—	November 29, 2005	Socorro	LINEAR	·	1.9 km	MPC · JPL
483816	2005 WO_{113}	—	November 27, 2005	Socorro	LINEAR	H	730 m	MPC · JPL
483817	2005 WN_{124}	—	November 25, 2005	Catalina	CSS	·	950 m	MPC · JPL
483818	2005 WX_{125}	—	October 30, 2005	Kitt Peak	Spacewatch	·	910 m	MPC · JPL
483819	2005 WD_{143}	—	November 22, 2005	Kitt Peak	Spacewatch	·	830 m	MPC · JPL
483820	2005 WN_{146}	—	November 25, 2005	Kitt Peak	Spacewatch	NYS	580 m	MPC · JPL
483821	2005 WZ_{166}	—	November 29, 2005	Mount Lemmon	Mount Lemmon Survey	·	2.1 km	MPC · JPL
483822	2005 WW_{169}	—	November 22, 2005	Kitt Peak	Spacewatch	·	2.2 km	MPC · JPL
483823	2005 WU_{171}	—	November 30, 2005	Kitt Peak	Spacewatch	·	720 m	MPC · JPL
483824	2005 WV_{174}	—	November 30, 2005	Kitt Peak	Spacewatch	·	760 m	MPC · JPL
483825	2005 WS_{175}	—	November 30, 2005	Kitt Peak	Spacewatch	ERI	1.0 km	MPC · JPL
483826	2005 WL_{184}	—	November 28, 2005	Catalina	CSS	·	1.5 km	MPC · JPL
483827	2005 WA_{193}	—	November 26, 2005	Socorro	LINEAR	·	920 m	MPC · JPL
483828	2005 WA_{200}	—	November 25, 2005	Kitt Peak	Spacewatch	·	730 m	MPC · JPL
483829	2005 WW_{210}	—	November 22, 2005	Kitt Peak	Spacewatch	·	1.3 km	MPC · JPL
483830	2005 WY_{210}	—	November 25, 2005	Mount Lemmon	Mount Lemmon Survey	V	450 m	MPC · JPL
483831	2005 XL_{8}	—	December 7, 2005	Desert Moon	Stevens, B. L.	·	2.1 km	MPC · JPL
483832	2005 XR_{16}	—	December 1, 2005	Kitt Peak	Spacewatch	NYS	730 m	MPC · JPL
483833	2005 XU_{21}	—	October 29, 2005	Kitt Peak	Spacewatch	TIR	2.6 km	MPC · JPL
483834	2005 XF_{27}	—	December 4, 2005	Kitt Peak	Spacewatch	·	1.9 km	MPC · JPL
483835	2005 XD_{35}	—	December 4, 2005	Kitt Peak	Spacewatch	(2076)	830 m	MPC · JPL
483836	2005 XV_{50}	—	December 2, 2005	Kitt Peak	Spacewatch	·	2.5 km	MPC · JPL
483837	2005 XJ_{52}	—	December 2, 2005	Kitt Peak	Spacewatch	V	680 m	MPC · JPL
483838	2005 XG_{54}	—	December 5, 2005	Kitt Peak	Spacewatch	·	1.7 km	MPC · JPL
483839	2005 XY_{66}	—	December 4, 2005	Kitt Peak	Spacewatch	·	830 m	MPC · JPL
483840	2005 XR_{68}	—	November 21, 2005	Kitt Peak	Spacewatch	·	1.3 km	MPC · JPL
483841	2005 XZ_{76}	—	December 2, 2005	Socorro	LINEAR	·	700 m	MPC · JPL
483842	2005 XN_{85}	—	December 2, 2005	Kitt Peak	Spacewatch	PHO	1.3 km	MPC · JPL
483843	2005 YQ_{6}	—	December 8, 2005	Kitt Peak	Spacewatch	EOS	1.5 km	MPC · JPL
483844	2005 YF_{8}	—	December 22, 2005	Kitt Peak	Spacewatch	·	2.5 km	MPC · JPL
483845	2005 YY_{9}	—	December 21, 2005	Kitt Peak	Spacewatch	·	1.5 km	MPC · JPL
483846	2005 YG_{10}	—	November 22, 2005	Kitt Peak	Spacewatch	·	1.6 km	MPC · JPL
483847	2005 YJ_{14}	—	December 22, 2005	Kitt Peak	Spacewatch	·	3.3 km	MPC · JPL
483848	2005 YZ_{18}	—	November 4, 2005	Mount Lemmon	Mount Lemmon Survey	·	2.7 km	MPC · JPL
483849	2005 YN_{22}	—	December 24, 2005	Kitt Peak	Spacewatch	THM	1.8 km	MPC · JPL
483850	2005 YX_{23}	—	December 24, 2005	Kitt Peak	Spacewatch	·	790 m	MPC · JPL
483851	2005 YD_{27}	—	December 22, 2005	Kitt Peak	Spacewatch	MAS	600 m	MPC · JPL
483852	2005 YV_{28}	—	December 22, 2005	Kitt Peak	Spacewatch	·	1.9 km	MPC · JPL
483853	2005 YK_{31}	—	December 22, 2005	Kitt Peak	Spacewatch	·	1.0 km	MPC · JPL
483854	2005 YF_{32}	—	December 22, 2005	Kitt Peak	Spacewatch	·	2.9 km	MPC · JPL
483855	2005 YA_{43}	—	December 2, 2005	Mount Lemmon	Mount Lemmon Survey	EMA	2.5 km	MPC · JPL
483856	2005 YV_{55}	—	December 28, 2005	Catalina	CSS	AMO	310 m	MPC · JPL
483857	2005 YZ_{77}	—	November 18, 2001	Kitt Peak	Spacewatch	MAS	570 m	MPC · JPL
483858	2005 YO_{83}	—	December 24, 2005	Kitt Peak	Spacewatch	MAS	610 m	MPC · JPL
483859	2005 YM_{87}	—	November 26, 2005	Mount Lemmon	Mount Lemmon Survey	·	2.4 km	MPC · JPL
483860	2005 YH_{88}	—	December 2, 2005	Mount Lemmon	Mount Lemmon Survey	EOS	1.6 km	MPC · JPL
483861	2005 YU_{89}	—	December 26, 2005	Mount Lemmon	Mount Lemmon Survey	·	1.0 km	MPC · JPL
483862	2005 YA_{97}	—	December 24, 2005	Kitt Peak	Spacewatch	ERI	1.2 km	MPC · JPL
483863	2005 YO_{109}	—	December 25, 2005	Kitt Peak	Spacewatch	·	2.2 km	MPC · JPL
483864	2005 YP_{111}	—	December 25, 2005	Kitt Peak	Spacewatch	NYS	760 m	MPC · JPL
483865	2005 YT_{111}	—	December 25, 2005	Kitt Peak	Spacewatch	·	1.9 km	MPC · JPL
483866	2005 YM_{112}	—	December 25, 2005	Mount Lemmon	Mount Lemmon Survey	·	1.3 km	MPC · JPL
483867	2005 YJ_{117}	—	November 25, 2005	Mount Lemmon	Mount Lemmon Survey	·	2.5 km	MPC · JPL
483868	2005 YF_{130}	—	December 24, 2005	Kitt Peak	Spacewatch	·	860 m	MPC · JPL
483869	2005 YO_{135}	—	December 1, 2005	Mount Lemmon	Mount Lemmon Survey	EOS	1.7 km	MPC · JPL
483870	2005 YY_{135}	—	December 26, 2005	Kitt Peak	Spacewatch	·	2.8 km	MPC · JPL
483871	2005 YX_{136}	—	November 30, 2005	Mount Lemmon	Mount Lemmon Survey	ERI	1.1 km	MPC · JPL
483872	2005 YJ_{139}	—	December 4, 2005	Kitt Peak	Spacewatch	·	1.7 km	MPC · JPL
483873	2005 YO_{143}	—	December 28, 2005	Mount Lemmon	Mount Lemmon Survey	·	2.1 km	MPC · JPL
483874	2005 YB_{145}	—	December 28, 2005	Mount Lemmon	Mount Lemmon Survey	·	970 m	MPC · JPL
483875	2005 YK_{159}	—	November 25, 2005	Mount Lemmon	Mount Lemmon Survey	·	2.3 km	MPC · JPL
483876	2005 YN_{163}	—	December 27, 2005	Kitt Peak	Spacewatch	·	4.3 km	MPC · JPL
483877	2005 YX_{164}	—	December 3, 1999	Kitt Peak	Spacewatch	·	3.5 km	MPC · JPL
483878	2005 YS_{165}	—	December 31, 2005	Siding Spring	SSS	AMO +1km	1.1 km	MPC · JPL
483879	2005 YZ_{175}	—	December 22, 2005	Kitt Peak	Spacewatch	THM	2.0 km	MPC · JPL
483880	2005 YP_{193}	—	December 30, 2005	Kitt Peak	Spacewatch	·	710 m	MPC · JPL
483881	2005 YS_{202}	—	December 2, 2005	Mount Lemmon	Mount Lemmon Survey	·	2.1 km	MPC · JPL
483882	2005 YV_{218}	—	December 30, 2005	Mount Lemmon	Mount Lemmon Survey	·	770 m	MPC · JPL
483883	2005 YO_{227}	—	December 25, 2005	Kitt Peak	Spacewatch	·	1.7 km	MPC · JPL
483884	2005 YH_{241}	—	December 29, 2005	Kitt Peak	Spacewatch	·	2.2 km	MPC · JPL
483885	2005 YJ_{246}	—	December 30, 2005	Kitt Peak	Spacewatch	·	2.4 km	MPC · JPL
483886	2005 YO_{246}	—	December 30, 2005	Kitt Peak	Spacewatch	·	1.6 km	MPC · JPL
483887	2005 YB_{254}	—	November 25, 2005	Mount Lemmon	Mount Lemmon Survey	·	770 m	MPC · JPL
483888	2005 YW_{271}	—	December 28, 2005	Mount Lemmon	Mount Lemmon Survey	·	4.3 km	MPC · JPL
483889	2005 YN_{290}	—	December 25, 2005	Kitt Peak	Spacewatch	·	2.6 km	MPC · JPL
483890	2005 YQ_{292}	—	November 25, 2005	Kitt Peak	Spacewatch	·	1.6 km	MPC · JPL
483891	2006 AB_{4}	—	January 6, 2006	Gnosca	S. Sposetti	·	3.5 km	MPC · JPL
483892	2006 AO_{9}	—	December 28, 2005	Kitt Peak	Spacewatch	·	780 m	MPC · JPL
483893	2006 AX_{16}	—	January 5, 2006	Socorro	LINEAR	·	2.7 km	MPC · JPL
483894	2006 AP_{17}	—	December 2, 2005	Mount Lemmon	Mount Lemmon Survey	·	2.2 km	MPC · JPL
483895	2006 AX_{18}	—	December 1, 2005	Mount Lemmon	Mount Lemmon Survey	EOS	1.8 km	MPC · JPL
483896	2006 AZ_{22}	—	January 4, 2006	Kitt Peak	Spacewatch	·	860 m	MPC · JPL
483897	2006 AC_{23}	—	January 4, 2006	Kitt Peak	Spacewatch	·	930 m	MPC · JPL
483898	2006 AS_{41}	—	December 28, 2005	Kitt Peak	Spacewatch	·	2.8 km	MPC · JPL
483899	2006 AM_{42}	—	January 6, 2006	Mount Lemmon	Mount Lemmon Survey	·	2.3 km	MPC · JPL
483900	2006 AG_{44}	—	December 30, 2005	Mount Lemmon	Mount Lemmon Survey	·	2.6 km	MPC · JPL

== 483901–484000 ==
back to top

Designation			Discovery			Properties		Ref
Permanent	Provisional	Named after	Date	Site	Discoverer(s)	Category	Diam.	Ref
483901	2006 AC_{50}	—	December 25, 2005	Mount Lemmon	Mount Lemmon Survey	·	740 m	MPC · JPL
483902	2006 AM_{52}	—	January 5, 2006	Kitt Peak	Spacewatch	NYS	820 m	MPC · JPL
483903	2006 AP_{52}	—	December 28, 2005	Kitt Peak	Spacewatch	·	1.5 km	MPC · JPL
483904	2006 AQ_{52}	—	December 28, 2005	Kitt Peak	Spacewatch	·	2.1 km	MPC · JPL
483905	2006 AQ_{67}	—	December 28, 2005	Kitt Peak	Spacewatch	·	3.0 km	MPC · JPL
483906	2006 AN_{73}	—	January 8, 2006	Mount Lemmon	Mount Lemmon Survey	·	790 m	MPC · JPL
483907	2006 AE_{85}	—	January 6, 2006	Socorro	LINEAR	·	3.4 km	MPC · JPL
483908	2006 AD_{92}	—	January 7, 2006	Mount Lemmon	Mount Lemmon Survey	NYS	990 m	MPC · JPL
483909	2006 AT_{94}	—	January 8, 2006	Kitt Peak	Spacewatch	MAS	430 m	MPC · JPL
483910	2006 AE_{104}	—	January 5, 2006	Mount Lemmon	Mount Lemmon Survey	EOS	2.2 km	MPC · JPL
483911	2006 BH_{8}	—	January 4, 2006	Mount Lemmon	Mount Lemmon Survey	·	2.6 km	MPC · JPL
483912	2006 BE_{17}	—	January 22, 2006	Mount Lemmon	Mount Lemmon Survey	MAS	590 m	MPC · JPL
483913	2006 BV_{18}	—	January 22, 2006	Mount Lemmon	Mount Lemmon Survey	·	1.1 km	MPC · JPL
483914	2006 BZ_{24}	—	January 23, 2006	Mount Lemmon	Mount Lemmon Survey	NYS	940 m	MPC · JPL
483915	2006 BN_{31}	—	January 20, 2006	Kitt Peak	Spacewatch	·	1.2 km	MPC · JPL
483916	2006 BY_{42}	—	January 23, 2006	Kitt Peak	Spacewatch	·	2.0 km	MPC · JPL
483917	2006 BW_{44}	—	January 23, 2006	Mount Lemmon	Mount Lemmon Survey	·	2.1 km	MPC · JPL
483918	2006 BA_{46}	—	January 23, 2006	Mount Lemmon	Mount Lemmon Survey	·	2.0 km	MPC · JPL
483919	2006 BU_{47}	—	January 8, 2006	Kitt Peak	Spacewatch	THM	1.9 km	MPC · JPL
483920	2006 BD_{48}	—	January 25, 2006	Kitt Peak	Spacewatch	MAS	590 m	MPC · JPL
483921	2006 BB_{49}	—	January 7, 2006	Kitt Peak	Spacewatch	·	2.9 km	MPC · JPL
483922	2006 BV_{59}	—	January 25, 2006	Kitt Peak	Spacewatch	MAS	560 m	MPC · JPL
483923	2006 BW_{59}	—	January 25, 2006	Kitt Peak	Spacewatch	·	800 m	MPC · JPL
483924	2006 BV_{61}	—	January 22, 2006	Catalina	CSS	H	510 m	MPC · JPL
483925	2006 BP_{62}	—	December 1, 2005	Mount Lemmon	Mount Lemmon Survey	H	520 m	MPC · JPL
483926	2006 BU_{66}	—	January 20, 2006	Kitt Peak	Spacewatch	·	750 m	MPC · JPL
483927	2006 BD_{67}	—	January 23, 2006	Kitt Peak	Spacewatch	·	1.1 km	MPC · JPL
483928	2006 BQ_{67}	—	January 10, 2006	Mount Lemmon	Mount Lemmon Survey	·	1.1 km	MPC · JPL
483929	2006 BR_{68}	—	January 23, 2006	Kitt Peak	Spacewatch	·	850 m	MPC · JPL
483930	2006 BW_{69}	—	January 23, 2006	Kitt Peak	Spacewatch	·	1.0 km	MPC · JPL
483931	2006 BD_{76}	—	January 23, 2006	Kitt Peak	Spacewatch	·	2.6 km	MPC · JPL
483932	2006 BT_{83}	—	January 25, 2006	Kitt Peak	Spacewatch	·	790 m	MPC · JPL
483933	2006 BQ_{85}	—	January 25, 2006	Kitt Peak	Spacewatch	·	860 m	MPC · JPL
483934	2006 BD_{89}	—	January 25, 2006	Kitt Peak	Spacewatch	·	1.0 km	MPC · JPL
483935	2006 BE_{90}	—	January 20, 2006	Kitt Peak	Spacewatch	·	810 m	MPC · JPL
483936	2006 BN_{91}	—	January 23, 2006	Kitt Peak	Spacewatch	·	2.2 km	MPC · JPL
483937	2006 BZ_{100}	—	January 23, 2006	Kitt Peak	Spacewatch	EOS	1.6 km	MPC · JPL
483938	2006 BJ_{105}	—	January 8, 2006	Kitt Peak	Spacewatch	·	730 m	MPC · JPL
483939	2006 BP_{107}	—	January 5, 2006	Mount Lemmon	Mount Lemmon Survey	·	990 m	MPC · JPL
483940	2006 BG_{110}	—	January 25, 2006	Kitt Peak	Spacewatch	MAS	570 m	MPC · JPL
483941	2006 BX_{110}	—	January 25, 2006	Kitt Peak	Spacewatch	·	3.0 km	MPC · JPL
483942	2006 BX_{112}	—	January 25, 2006	Kitt Peak	Spacewatch	CLA	1.3 km	MPC · JPL
483943	2006 BN_{123}	—	January 26, 2006	Kitt Peak	Spacewatch	·	940 m	MPC · JPL
483944	2006 BS_{123}	—	January 26, 2006	Kitt Peak	Spacewatch	·	2.3 km	MPC · JPL
483945	2006 BS_{124}	—	January 26, 2006	Kitt Peak	Spacewatch	THM	1.9 km	MPC · JPL
483946	2006 BT_{127}	—	January 26, 2006	Kitt Peak	Spacewatch	·	2.1 km	MPC · JPL
483947	2006 BK_{130}	—	January 26, 2006	Kitt Peak	Spacewatch	·	2.5 km	MPC · JPL
483948	2006 BP_{132}	—	January 26, 2006	Kitt Peak	Spacewatch	·	2.7 km	MPC · JPL
483949	2006 BU_{133}	—	January 26, 2006	Mount Lemmon	Mount Lemmon Survey	·	2.4 km	MPC · JPL
483950	2006 BY_{140}	—	December 25, 2005	Mount Lemmon	Mount Lemmon Survey	·	1.0 km	MPC · JPL
483951 Fiorella	2006 BM_{147}	Fiorella	January 31, 2006	Vallemare Borbona	V. S. Casulli	·	940 m	MPC · JPL
483952	2006 BD_{151}	—	January 25, 2006	Kitt Peak	Spacewatch	·	2.4 km	MPC · JPL
483953	2006 BE_{154}	—	January 7, 2006	Mount Lemmon	Mount Lemmon Survey	·	1.2 km	MPC · JPL
483954	2006 BY_{156}	—	January 25, 2006	Kitt Peak	Spacewatch	·	1.2 km	MPC · JPL
483955	2006 BS_{164}	—	January 26, 2006	Kitt Peak	Spacewatch	MAS	640 m	MPC · JPL
483956	2006 BL_{171}	—	January 27, 2006	Kitt Peak	Spacewatch	·	2.4 km	MPC · JPL
483957	2006 BW_{171}	—	January 6, 2006	Mount Lemmon	Mount Lemmon Survey	·	1.6 km	MPC · JPL
483958	2006 BW_{188}	—	January 23, 2006	Kitt Peak	Spacewatch	·	3.3 km	MPC · JPL
483959	2006 BZ_{192}	—	January 30, 2006	Kitt Peak	Spacewatch	·	4.1 km	MPC · JPL
483960	2006 BO_{198}	—	January 30, 2006	Kitt Peak	Spacewatch	·	2.7 km	MPC · JPL
483961	2006 BW_{202}	—	January 31, 2006	Kitt Peak	Spacewatch	NYS	900 m	MPC · JPL
483962	2006 BJ_{205}	—	January 31, 2006	Kitt Peak	Spacewatch	·	860 m	MPC · JPL
483963	2006 BZ_{209}	—	January 23, 2006	Kitt Peak	Spacewatch	·	2.2 km	MPC · JPL
483964	2006 BR_{210}	—	January 31, 2006	Mount Lemmon	Mount Lemmon Survey	·	2.5 km	MPC · JPL
483965	2006 BE_{212}	—	January 31, 2006	Kitt Peak	Spacewatch	·	3.3 km	MPC · JPL
483966	2006 BT_{214}	—	January 6, 2006	Catalina	CSS	H	540 m	MPC · JPL
483967	2006 BJ_{220}	—	January 30, 2006	Kitt Peak	Spacewatch	·	2.2 km	MPC · JPL
483968	2006 BJ_{226}	—	January 8, 2006	Mount Lemmon	Mount Lemmon Survey	L5	10 km	MPC · JPL
483969	2006 BL_{230}	—	January 23, 2006	Kitt Peak	Spacewatch	NYS	1.0 km	MPC · JPL
483970	2006 BW_{230}	—	January 23, 2006	Kitt Peak	Spacewatch	·	1.8 km	MPC · JPL
483971	2006 BL_{232}	—	January 31, 2006	Kitt Peak	Spacewatch	·	1.0 km	MPC · JPL
483972	2006 BZ_{233}	—	January 23, 2006	Kitt Peak	Spacewatch	THB	3.0 km	MPC · JPL
483973	2006 BG_{235}	—	January 23, 2006	Kitt Peak	Spacewatch	·	1.2 km	MPC · JPL
483974	2006 BN_{244}	—	January 31, 2006	Kitt Peak	Spacewatch	·	2.6 km	MPC · JPL
483975	2006 BK_{251}	—	January 31, 2006	Kitt Peak	Spacewatch	THM	2.0 km	MPC · JPL
483976	2006 BM_{256}	—	January 31, 2006	Kitt Peak	Spacewatch	NYS	910 m	MPC · JPL
483977	2006 BG_{263}	—	January 31, 2006	Kitt Peak	Spacewatch	·	2.4 km	MPC · JPL
483978	2006 BA_{264}	—	January 31, 2006	Kitt Peak	Spacewatch	·	1.0 km	MPC · JPL
483979	2006 BT_{272}	—	January 22, 2006	Mount Lemmon	Mount Lemmon Survey	·	1.0 km	MPC · JPL
483980	2006 BL_{277}	—	January 21, 2006	Mount Lemmon	Mount Lemmon Survey	·	1.3 km	MPC · JPL
483981	2006 BP_{277}	—	January 26, 2006	Kitt Peak	Spacewatch	MAS	570 m	MPC · JPL
483982	2006 BC_{279}	—	January 30, 2006	Kitt Peak	Spacewatch	·	970 m	MPC · JPL
483983	2006 BK_{282}	—	January 23, 2006	Kitt Peak	Spacewatch	·	1.0 km	MPC · JPL
483984	2006 BO_{282}	—	January 23, 2006	Kitt Peak	Spacewatch	·	2.4 km	MPC · JPL
483985	2006 BA_{284}	—	January 30, 2006	Kitt Peak	Spacewatch	·	2.4 km	MPC · JPL
483986	2006 BC_{284}	—	January 30, 2006	Kitt Peak	Spacewatch	·	2.2 km	MPC · JPL
483987	2006 CF_{4}	—	February 1, 2006	Mount Lemmon	Mount Lemmon Survey	·	1.1 km	MPC · JPL
483988	2006 CA_{7}	—	February 1, 2006	Mount Lemmon	Mount Lemmon Survey	·	3.0 km	MPC · JPL
483989	2006 CY_{10}	—	February 9, 2006	Anderson Mesa	LONEOS	AMO · APO · PHA	300 m	MPC · JPL
483990	2006 CC_{17}	—	January 9, 2006	Kitt Peak	Spacewatch	·	950 m	MPC · JPL
483991	2006 CD_{18}	—	January 23, 2006	Kitt Peak	Spacewatch	·	3.0 km	MPC · JPL
483992	2006 CY_{19}	—	January 5, 2006	Mount Lemmon	Mount Lemmon Survey	·	2.7 km	MPC · JPL
483993	2006 CU_{23}	—	January 22, 2006	Mount Lemmon	Mount Lemmon Survey	·	2.3 km	MPC · JPL
483994	2006 CX_{23}	—	January 10, 2006	Mount Lemmon	Mount Lemmon Survey	·	2.4 km	MPC · JPL
483995	2006 CD_{27}	—	February 2, 2006	Kitt Peak	Spacewatch	·	2.1 km	MPC · JPL
483996	2006 CV_{27}	—	February 2, 2006	Kitt Peak	Spacewatch	·	1.4 km	MPC · JPL
483997	2006 CE_{36}	—	February 2, 2006	Mount Lemmon	Mount Lemmon Survey	·	2.9 km	MPC · JPL
483998	2006 CJ_{49}	—	February 3, 2006	Socorro	LINEAR	·	960 m	MPC · JPL
483999	2006 CW_{50}	—	February 4, 2006	Kitt Peak	Spacewatch	·	1.9 km	MPC · JPL
484000	2006 CK_{61}	—	January 6, 2006	Catalina	CSS	·	3.5 km	MPC · JPL

back to top

== Meaning of names ==
As minor planet discoveries are confirmed, they are given a permanent number by the IAU's Minor Planet Center (MPC), and the discoverers can then submit names for them, following the IAU's naming conventions. The list below concerns those minor planets in the specified number-range that have received names, and explains the meanings of those names.

Official naming citations of newly named small Solar System bodies are approved and published in a bulletin by IAU's Working Group for Small Bodies Nomenclature (WGSBN). Before May 2021, citations were published in MPC's Minor Planet Circulars for many decades. Recent citations can also be found on the JPL Small-Body Database (SBDB). Until his death in 2016, German astronomer Lutz D. Schmadel compiled these citations into the Dictionary of Minor Planet Names (DMP) and regularly updated the collection.

Based on Paul Herget's The Names of the Minor Planets, Schmadel also researched the unclear origin of numerous asteroids, most of which had been named prior to World War II. This article incorporates text from this source, which is in the public domain: SBDB New namings may only be added to this list below after official publication as the preannouncement of names is condemned. The WGSBN publishes a comprehensive guideline for the naming rules of non-cometary small Solar System bodies.

Named minor planet	Provisional	This minor planet was named for...	Ref · Catalog
483454 Hosszúkatinka	2002 AF_{17}	Katinka Hosszú (born 1989) is a three-time Olympic champion Hungarian swimmer, who specializes in individual medley events. She is a nine-time long-course, and seventeen-time short-course world champion, and has broken 20 world records since 2013.	IAU · 483454
483488 Wudeshi	2002 RF_{257}	Wu Deshi (born 1969) of Liuan, Anhui, is a Chinese meteorite hunter who founded the first private meteorite museum in China, the Wujuelin Meteorite Pavilion in Tibet; he has found 56 meteorites in the Xinjiang desert, and he writes and talks extensively about meteorites.	JPL · 483488
483615 Martinmccarthy	2004 SP_{41}	Fr. Martin F. McCarthy, SJ (1923-2010), American astronomer noted for studying carbon stars. He served the Vatican Observatory from 1958 to 1999, where he oversaw their transition to doing modern research and started the observatory's Summer Schools in Astrophysics.	IAU · 483615
483636 Treanor	2004 TJ_{347}	Fr. Patrick Treanor, SJ (1920-1978), English astronomer. Won the Johnson Memorial Prize at Oxford University for his doctoral thesis on interference phenomena, and later served as director of the Vatican Observatory from 1970 until his death.	IAU · 483636
483637 Johanstein	2004 TM_{347}	Johan Stein, SJ (1888-1952), Dutch astronomer. Director of the Vatican Observatory from 1930 until his death, he opened the observatory to 12,000 refugees during World War II. He is also the namesake for the lunar crater Stein.	IAU · 483637
483951 Fiorella	2006 BM_{147}	Fiorella Isoardi (b. 1954), an Italian astronomer.	IAU · 483951
