= Fiorella Olivera =

Peruvian chemist and science communicator

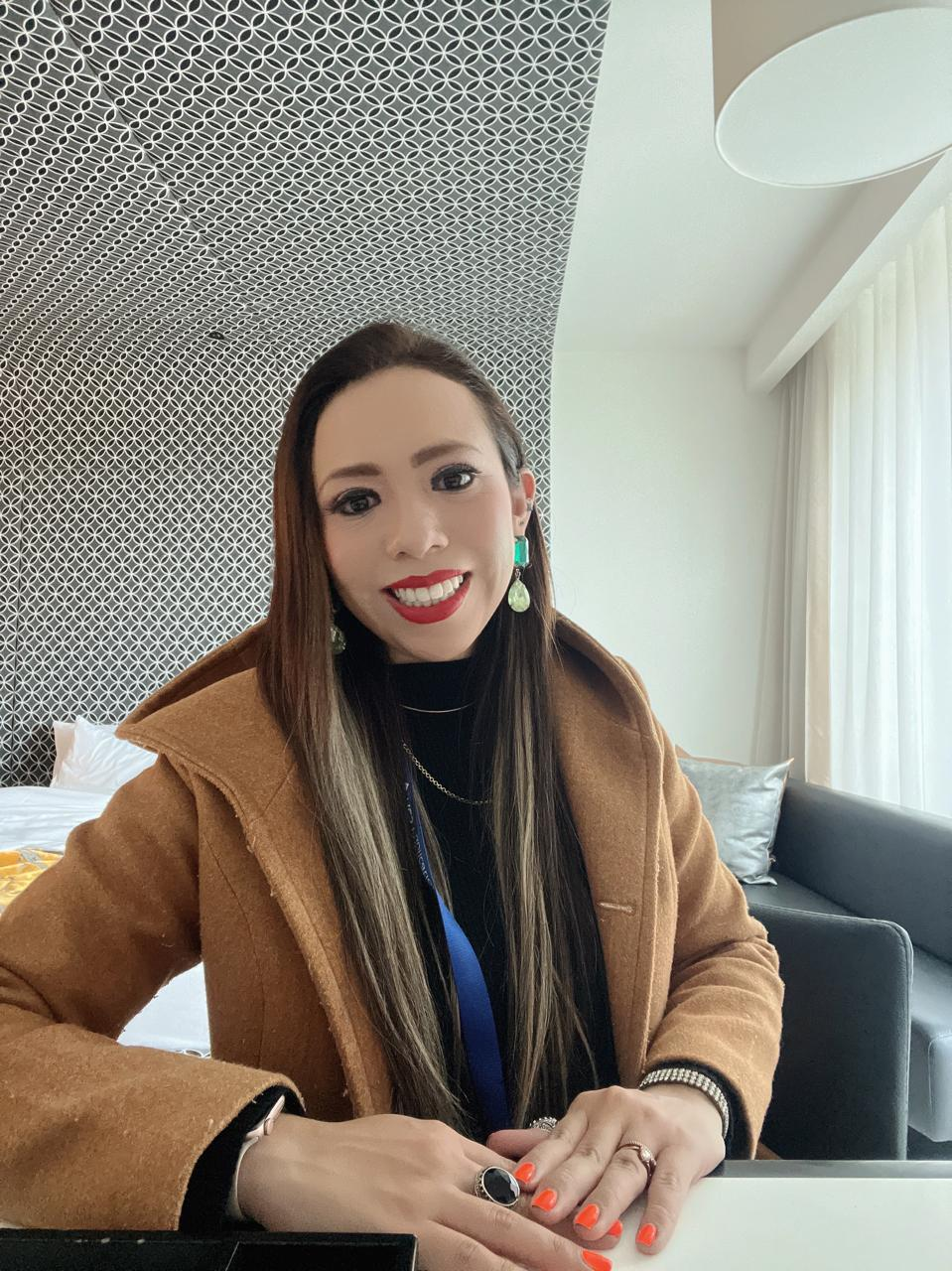
- Born: Peru
- Education: Cayetano Heredia University Pontifical Catholic University of Peru
- Awards: Award of Merit (Chemical Marketing & Economics and NASA) Doctor Honoris Causa for her contribution to scientific education (FINTES) American Chemical Society Scholarships for Science Outreach Projects (AMERICAN CHEMICAL SOCIETY)

Fiorella Lisset Olivera Venturo (Lima, 1989) is a Peruvian chemist and science communicator. She is a university professor, president of the Peruvian Chapter of the American Chemical Society (ACS), and director of Haciendo Ciencia, an organization dedicated to STEM education in Latin America.

== Biography ==
Fiorella Olivera was born in Lima in 1989. Her interest in science began when she was a student in school thanks to her chemistry teacher. The methodology applied by her teacher did not focus solely on solving exercises; the classes also highlighted the importance of chemistry in real life. This was the main reason Fiorella chose her path.

She earned her Chemistry degree at Cayetano Heredia University (UPCH) in 2011. Afterward, she obtained a Master's in Chemistry at the Pontifical Catholic University of Peru in 2015.

Her professional profile was complemented by various activities, the most relevant being the study of coordination complexes with biomedical applications at the Medicinal Inorganic Chemistry Laboratory of the National Autonomous University of Mexico. When Fiorella became a university professor, she noticed that few people were interested in science because it was considered a difficult field. As a result, she decided to promote science in a more accessible way.

== Career ==
In 2011, Olivera started to working as a university professor and researcher in Chemistry at the Cayetano Heredia University (UPCH) later teaching at Universidad Continental (UC) and Technological University of Peru (UTP).

Since 2019, she has been the president of the Peruvian chapter of the American Chemical Society, an organization that promotes scientific knowledge among young people of different age groups. She is also the director of Haciendo Ciencia. Through these projects, she has organized and led numerous science outreach events, such as Festival Peruano de Química and Encuentro de Niñas, Niños y Jóvenes en la Ciencia y la Ingeniería.

She has additionally created, along with other leaders of the professional chapters of the American Chemical Society, the platform Química sin Fronteras, a website that provides high-quality information in Spanish, focused on a young audience.

In 2021, Fiorella's STEM projects were recognized by the Chemical Marketing & Economics (CME) and NASA in Atlanta.

== Articles ==
Olivera has published various articles in scientific journals of high impact. Her most relevant publications were published in Revista de la Sociedad Química del Perú and Crystals:

- Synthesis and crystal structure of two lead (II) coordination complexes with 1,10-phenanthroline and a cadmium (II) complex with phthalate (2011)
- Synthesis and crystal structure of two lead (II) coordination complexes with 1,10-phenanthroline and nitrates (2012)
- N/N Bridge Type and Substituent Effects on Chemical and Crystallographic Properties of Schiff-Base (Salen/Salphen) Ni(II) Complexes (2020)

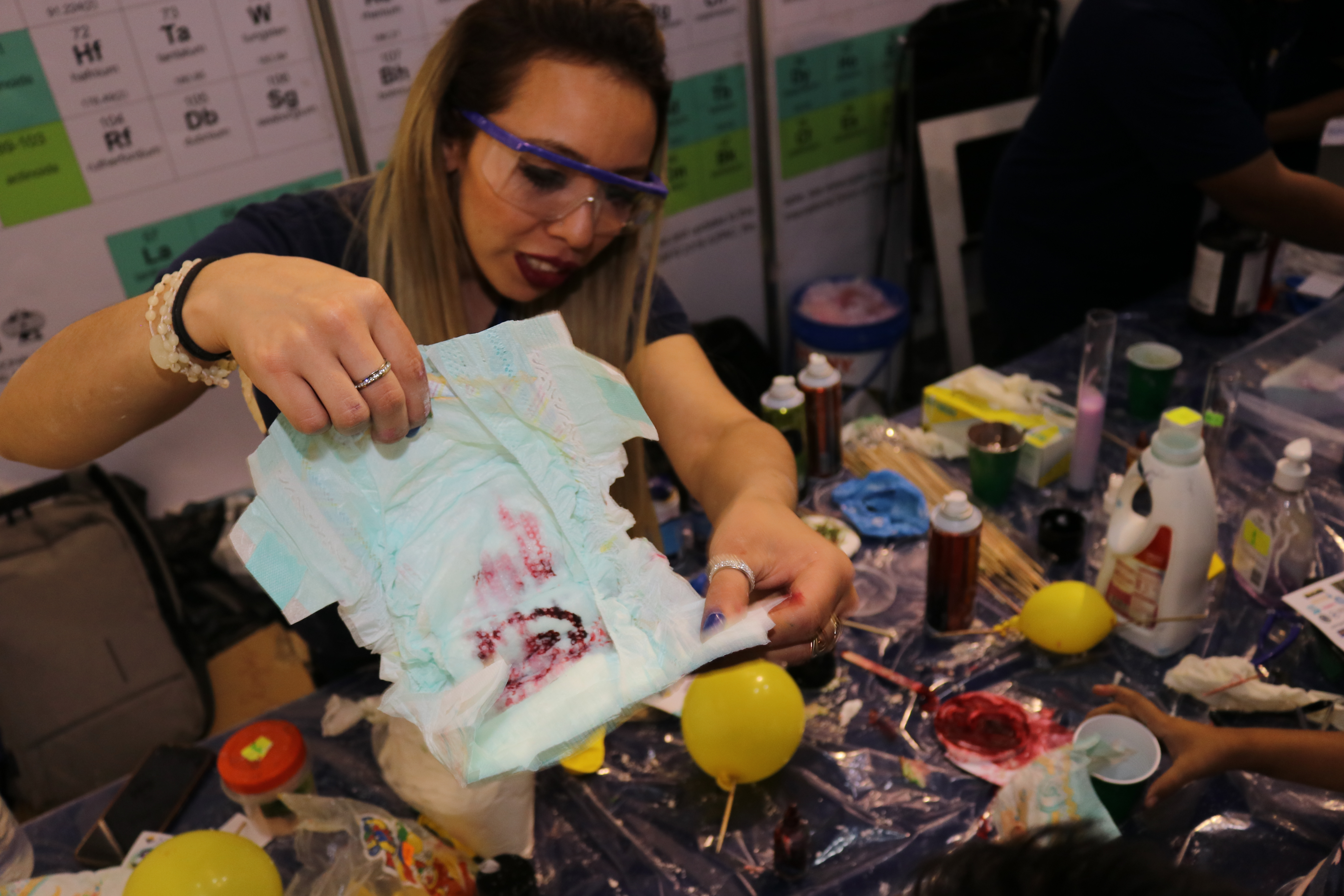
Fiorella Olivera Venturo using sodium polyacrylate, a superabsorbent substance found in diapers, as a reagent for playful experiments for children

== Awards ==
- 2019 Festival Training Institute host (American Chemical Society)
- IYPT Challenge Grant from the ACS Committee on International Activities (American Chemical Society)
- Award of Merit (Chemical Marketing & Economics and NASA)
- Doctor Honoris Causa for her contribution to scientific education (FINTES)
- American Chemical Society Scholarships for Science Outreach Projects (American Chemical Society)
- In 2025, she received the “Outreach Volunteer of the Year” award from the American Chemical Society.
