= Dark Energy Survey =

Project to measure the expansion of the universe

The Dark Energy Survey
- Dark Energy Camera (DECam), mounted on the Víctor M. Blanco Telescope at the Cerro Tololo Inter-American Observatory
- Alternative names: DES
- Website: www.darkenergysurvey.org
- Related media on Commons

The Dark Energy Survey (DES) is an astronomical survey designed to constrain the properties of dark energy. It uses images taken in the near-ultraviolet, visible, and near-infrared to measure the expansion of the universe using Type Ia supernovae, baryon acoustic oscillations, the number of galaxy clusters, and weak gravitational lensing. The collaboration is composed of research institutions and universities from the United States, Australia, Brazil, the United Kingdom, Germany, Spain, and Switzerland. The collaboration is divided into several scientific working groups. The director of DES is Josh Frieman.

The DES began by developing and building Dark Energy Camera (DECam), an instrument designed specifically for the survey. This camera has a wide field of view and high sensitivity, particularly in the red part of the visible spectrum and in the near infrared. Observations were performed with DECam mounted on the 4-meter Víctor M. Blanco Telescope, located at the Cerro Tololo Inter-American Observatory (CTIO) in Chile. Observing sessions ran from 2013 to 2019; as of 2021 the DES collaboration has published results from the first three years of the survey.

== DECam ==
Rosette Nebula imaged by DECam

DECam, short for the Dark Energy Camera, is a large camera built to replace the previous prime focus camera on the Victor M. Blanco Telescope. The camera consists of three major components: mechanics, optics, and CCDs.

=== Mechanics ===
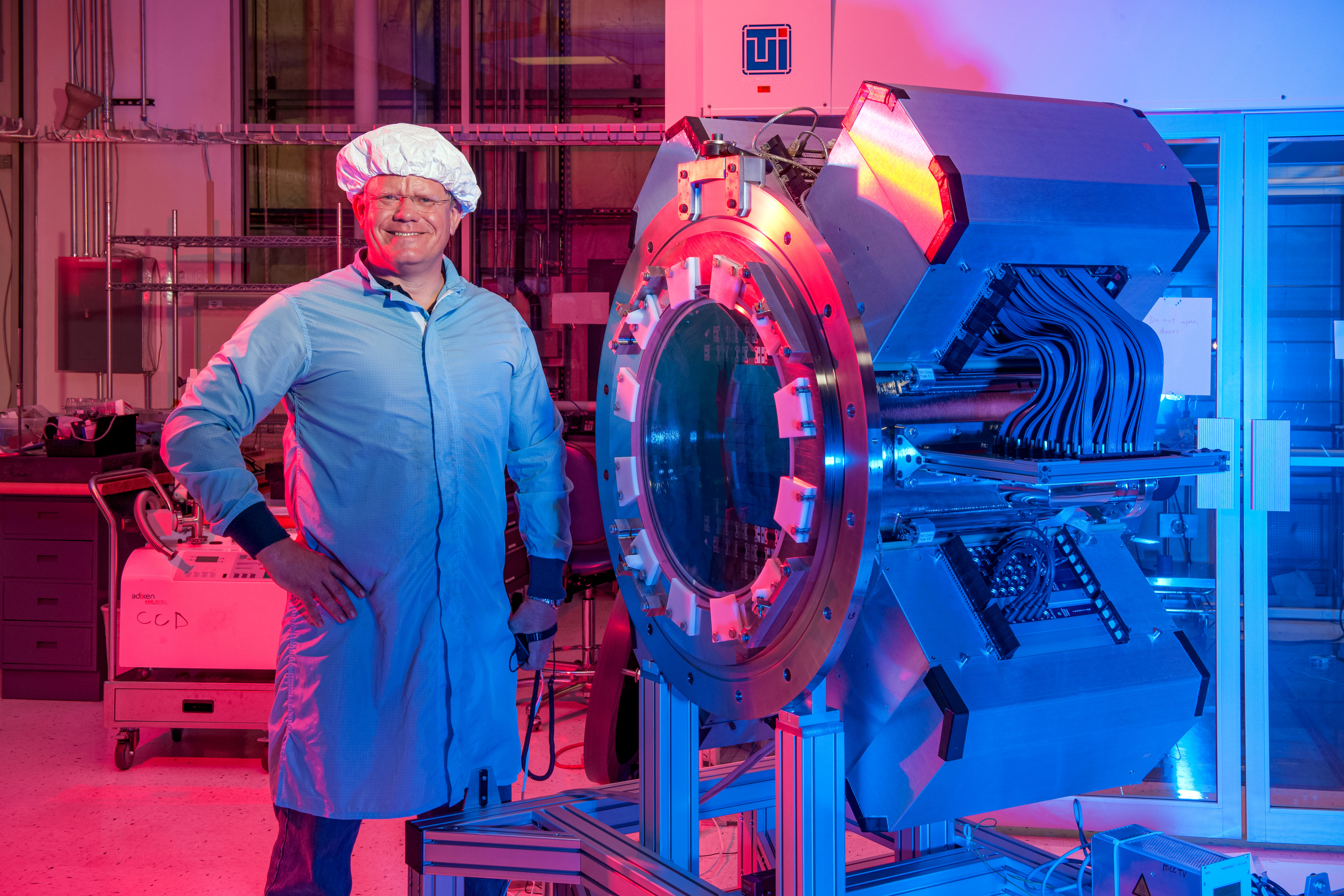
Dark Energy Camera imager and CCDs at SiDet.

The mechanics of the camera consists of a filter changer with an 8-filter capacity and shutter. There is also an optical barrel that supports 5 corrector lenses, the largest of which is 98 cm in diameter. These components are attached to the CCD focal plane which is cooled to 173 K (−148 °F; −100 °C) with liquid nitrogen in order to reduce thermal noise in the CCDs. The focal plane is also kept in an extremely low vacuum of 0.00013 pascals (1.3×10^{−9} atm) to prevent the formation of condensation on the sensors. The entire camera with lenses, filters, and CCDs weighs approximately 4 tons. When mounted at the prime focus it was supported with a hexapod system allowing for real time focal adjustment.

=== Optics ===
The camera is outfitted with u, g, r, i, z, and Y filters spanning roughly from 340–1070 nm, similar to those used in the Sloan Digital Sky Survey (SDSS). This allows DES to obtain photometric redshift measurements to z≈1. DECam also contains five lenses acting as corrector optics to extend the telescope's field of view to a diameter of 2.2°, one of the widest fields of view available for ground-based optical and infrared imaging. One significant difference between previous charge-coupled devices (CCD) at the Victor M. Blanco Telescope and DECam is the improved quantum efficiency in the red and near-infrared wavelengths.

=== CCDs ===
The Dark Energy Camera's 1 millionth exposure. The 1 millionth exposure has been combined with 127 earlier exposures to make this view of the field.

The scientific sensor array on DECam is an array of 62 2048×4096 pixel back-illuminated CCDs totaling 520 megapixels; an additional 12 2048×2048 pixel CCDs (50 Mpx) are used for guiding the telescope, monitoring focus, and alignment. The full DECam focal plane contains 570 megapixels. The CCDs for DECam use high resistivity silicon manufactured by Dalsa and LBNL with 15×15 micron pixels. By comparison, the OmniVision Technologies back-illuminated CCD that was used in the iPhone 4 has a 1.75×1.75 micron pixel with 5 megapixels. The larger pixels allow DECam to collect more light per pixel, improving low light sensitivity which is desirable for an astronomical instrument. DECam's CCDs also have a 250-micron crystal depth; this is significantly larger than most consumer CCDs. The additional crystal depth increases the path length travelled by entering photons. This, in turn, increases the probability of interaction and allows the CCDs to have an increased sensitivity to lower energy photons, extending the wavelength range to 1050 nm. Scientifically this is important because it allows one to look for objects at a higher redshift, increasing statistical power in the studies mentioned above. When placed in the telescope's focal plane each pixel has a width of 0.27″ on the sky, resulting in a total field of view of 3 square degrees.

== Survey ==
DES imaged 5,000 square degrees of the southern sky in a footprint that overlaps with the South Pole Telescope and Stripe 82 (in large part avoiding the Milky Way). The survey took 758 observing nights spread over six annual sessions between August and February to complete, covering the survey footprint ten times in five photometric bands (g, r, i, z, and Y). The survey reached a depth of 24th magnitude in the i band over the entire survey area. Longer exposure times and faster observing cadence were made in five smaller patches totaling 30 square degrees to search for supernovae.

First light was achieved on 12 September 2012; after a verification and testing period, scientific survey observations started in August 2013. The last observing session was completed on 9 January 2019.

=== Other surveys using DECam ===
After completion of the Dark Energy Survey, the Dark Energy Camera was used for other sky surveys:

- Dark Energy Camera Legacy Survey (DECaLS) covers the sky below 32°Declination, not including the Milky Way. This survey covers over 9000 square degrees.
- The DESI Legacy Imaging Surveys (Legacy Surveys), as of data release 10, includes DECaLS, BASS and MzLS. It also incorporating additional DECam data, which means that it covers almost the entire extragalactic southern sky, including parts of the Magellanic Clouds. The purpose of the Legacy Surveys is to find targets for the Dark Energy Spectroscopic Instrument.
- Dark Energy Camera Plane Survey (DECaPS), covers the Milky Way in the southern sky.

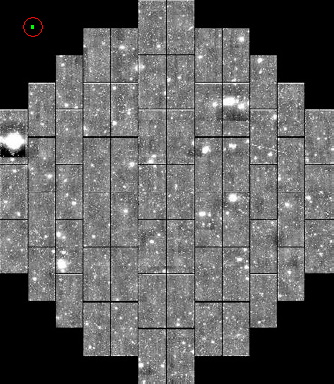
Simulated image of the DECam CCD array at focal plane. Each large rectangle is a single CCD. The green rectangle circled in red in the upper left corner shows the size of the iPhone 4 camera CCD at the same scale.

== Observing ==
The footprint of the wide-area survey on the sky (colored region) in celestial coordinates; the dashed curve shows the approximate location of the Milky Way disk in these coordinates.

Each year from August through February, observers will stay in dormitories on the mountain. During a weeklong period of work, observers sleep during the day and use the telescope and camera at night. There will be some DES members working at the telescope console to monitor operations while others are monitoring camera operations and data process.

For the wide-area footprint observations, DES takes roughly two minutes for each new image: The exposures are typically 90 seconds long, with another 30 seconds for readout of the camera data and slewing to point the telescope at its next target. Despite the restrictions on each exposure, the team also need to consider different sky conditions for the observations, such as moonlight and cloud cover.

In order to get better images, DES team use a computer algorithm called the "Observing Tactician" (ObsTac) to help with sequencing observations. It optimizes among different factors, such as the date and time, weather conditions, and the position of the moon. ObsTac automatically points the telescope in the best direction, and selects the exposure, using the best light filter. It also decides whether to take a wide-area or time-domain survey image, depending on whether or not the exposure will also be used for supernova searches.

== Results ==
=== Cosmology ===
Constraints on a measure of the clumpiness of the matter distribution (S8) and the fractional density of the Universe in matter (Ωm) from the combined 3 DES Y1 measurements (blue), Planck CMB measurements (green), and their combination (red).

Dark Energy Group published several papers presenting their results for cosmology. Most of these cosmology results coming from its first-year data and the third-year data. Their results for cosmology were concluded with a Multi-Probe Methodology, which mainly combine the data from Galaxy-Galaxy Lensing, different shape of weak lensing, cosmic shear, galaxy clustering and photometric data set.

For the first-year data collected by DES, Dark Energy Survey Group showed the Cosmological Constraints results from Galaxy Clustering and Weak Lensing results and cosmic shear measurement. With Galaxy Clustering and Weak Lensing results, $S_8=\sigma_8(\Omega_m/0.3)^{0.5}= 0.773_{-0.020}^{+0.026}$ and $\Omega_m= 0.267_{-0.017}^{+0.030}$ for ΛCDM, $S_8= 0.782_{-0.024}^{+0.036}$, $\Omega_m= 0.284_{-0.030}^{+0.033}$ and $\omega= -0.82_{-0.20}^{+0.21}$ at 68% confidence limits for ωCMD. Combine the most significant measurements of cosmic shear in a galaxy survey, Dark Energy Survey Group showed that $\sigma_8(\Omega_m/0.3)^{0.5}= 0.782_{-0.027}^{+0.027}$ at 68% confidence limits and $\sigma_8(\Omega_m/0.3)^{0.5}= 0.777_{-0.038}^{+0.036}$ for ΛCDM with $\omega= -0.95_{-0.36}^{+0.33}$. Other cosmological analyses from first year data showed a derivation and validation of redshift distribution estimates and their uncertainties for the galaxies used as weak lensing sources. The DES team also published a paper summarize all the Photometric Data Set for Cosmology for their first-year data.

For the third-year data collected by DES, they updated the Cosmological Constraints to $\sigma_8(\Omega_m/0.3)^{0.5}= 0.759_{-0.025}^{+0.023}$ for the ΛCDM model with the new cosmic shear measurements. From third-year data of Galaxy Clustering and Weak Lensing results, DES updated the Cosmological Constraints to $S_8=\sigma_8(\Omega_m/0.3)^{0.5}= 0.776_{-0.017}^{+0.017}$ and $\Omega_m= 0.339_{-0.031}^{+0.032}$ in ΛCDM at 68% confidence limits, $S_8=\sigma_8(\Omega_m/0.3)^{0.5}= 0.775_{-0.024}^{+0.026}$, $\Omega_m= 0.352_{-0.041}^{+0.035}$ and $\omega= -0.98_{-0.20}^{+0.32}$ in ωCDM at 68% confidence limits. Similarly, the DES team published their third-year observations for photometric data set for cosmology comprising nearly 5000 deg2 of grizY imaging in the south Galactic cap, including nearly 390 million objects, with depth reaching S/N ~ 10 for extended objects up to $i_{AB}$ ~ 23.0, and top-of-the-atmosphere photometric uniformity < 3mmag.

=== Weak lensing ===
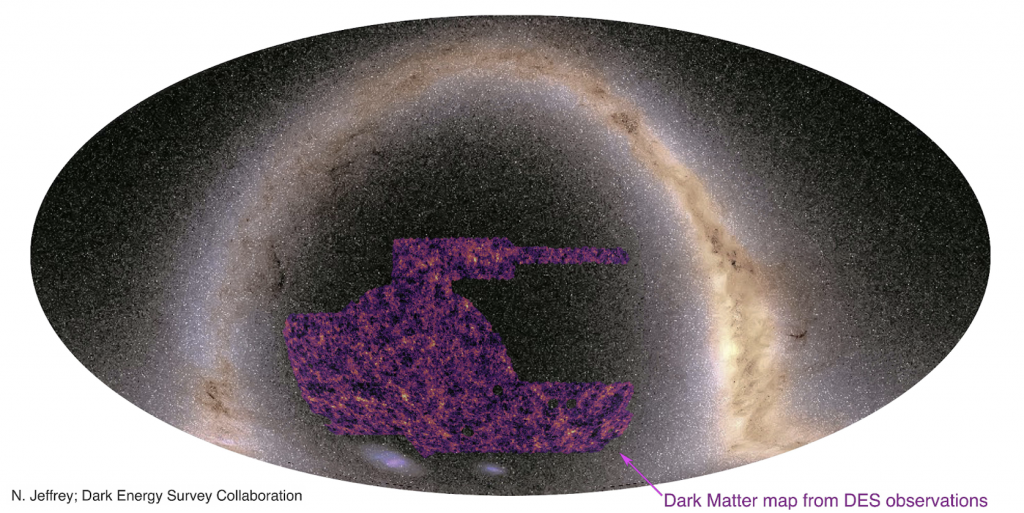
DES's 2021 Dark matter map using weak gravitational lensing data set projected in the foreground of observed galaxies

Weak lensing was measured statistically by measuring the shear-shear correlation function, a two-point function, or its Fourier Transform, the shear power spectrum. In April 2015, the Dark Energy Survey released mass maps using cosmic shear measurements of about 2 million galaxies from the science verification data between August 2012 and February 2013. In 2021 weak lensing was used to map the dark matter in a region of the southern hemisphere sky, in 2022 together with galaxy clustering data to give new cosmological constrains. and in 2023 with data from the Planck telescope and South Pole telescope to give once new improved constraints.

Another big part of weak lensing result is to calibrate the redshift of the source galaxies. In December 2020 and June 2021, DES team published two papers showing their results about using weak lensing to calibrate the redshift of the source galaxies in order to mapping the matter density field with gravitational lensing.

=== Gravitational waves ===
After LIGO detected the first gravitational wave signal from GW170817, DES made follow-up observations of GW170817 using DECam. With DECam independent discovery of the optical source, DES team establish its association with GW170817 by showing that none of the 1500 other sources found within the event localization region could plausibly be associated with the event. DES team monitored the source for over two weeks and provide the light curve data as a machine-readable file. From the observation data set, DES concluded that the optical counterpart they have identified near NGC 4993 is associated with GW170817. This discovery ushers in the era of multi-messenger astronomy with gravitational waves and demonstrates the power of DECam to identify the optical counterparts of gravitational-wave sources.

=== Dwarf galaxies ===
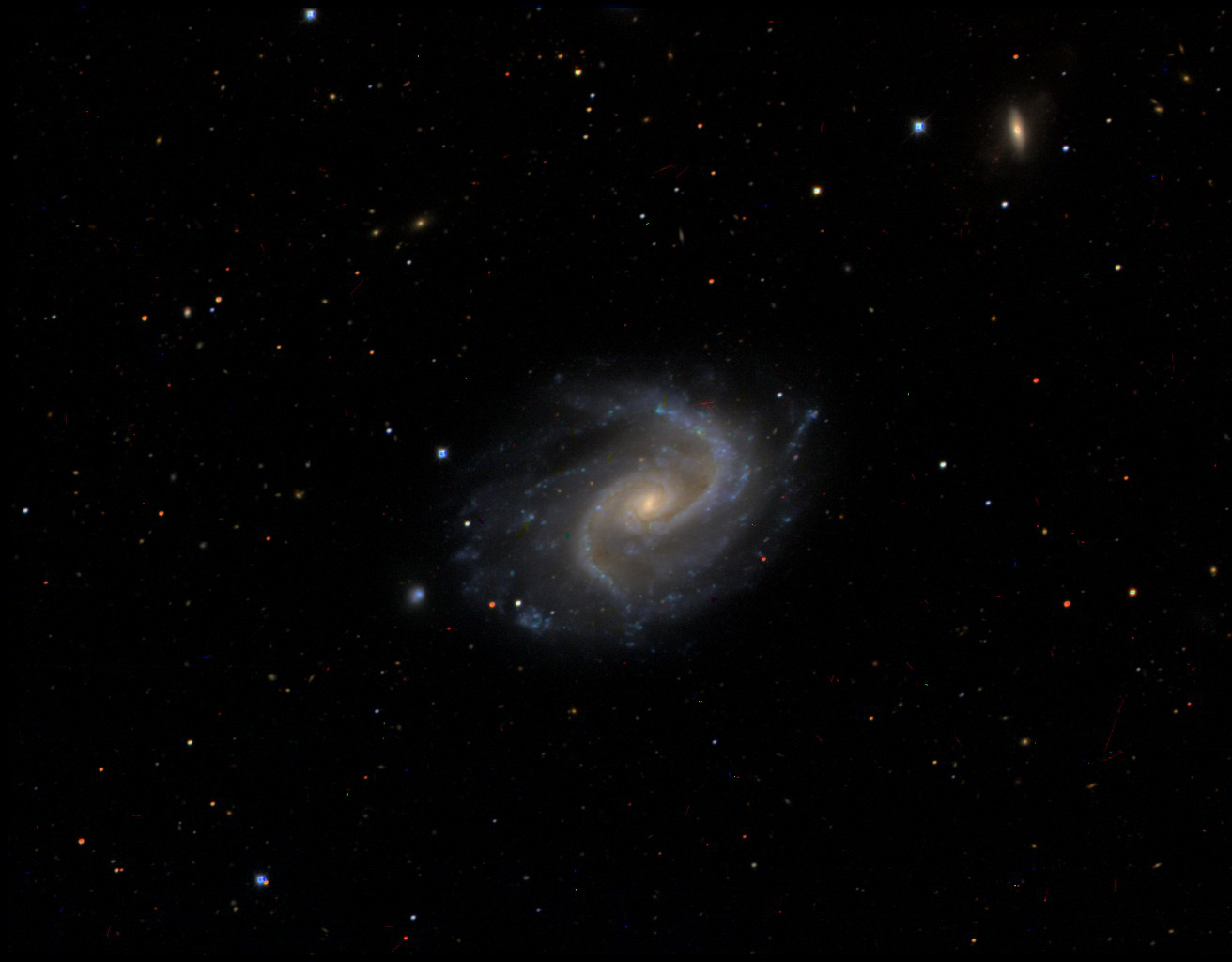
Spiral Galaxy NGC 895 imaged by DES

In March 2015, two teams released their discoveries of several new potential dwarf galaxy candidates found in Year 1 DES data. In August 2015, the Dark Energy Survey team announced the discovery of eight additional candidates in Year 2 DES data. Later on, Dark Energy Survey team found more dwarf galaxies. With more Dwarf Galaxy results, the team was able to take a deep look about more properties of the detected Dwarf Galaxy such as the chemical abundance, the structure of stellar population, and Stellar Kinematics and Metallicities. In Feb 2019, the team also discovered a sixth star cluster in the Fornax Dwarf Spheroidal Galaxy and a tidally Disrupted Ultra-Faint Dwarf Galaxy.

=== Baryon acoustic oscillations ===
The signature of baryon acoustic oscillations (BAO) can be observed in the distribution of tracers of the matter density field and used to measure the expansion history of the Universe. BAO can also be measured using purely photometric data, though at less significance. DES team observation samples consists of 7 million galaxies distributed over a footprint of 4100 deg^{2} with 0.6 < z_{photo} < 1.1 and a typical redshift uncertainty of 0.03(1+z). From their statistics, they combine the likelihoods derived from angular correlations and spherical harmonics to constrain the ratio of comoving angular diameter distance $D_m(Z_\text{eff} = 0.835)/r_d=18.92\pm0.51$ at the effective redshift of our sample to the sound horizon scale at the drag epoch.

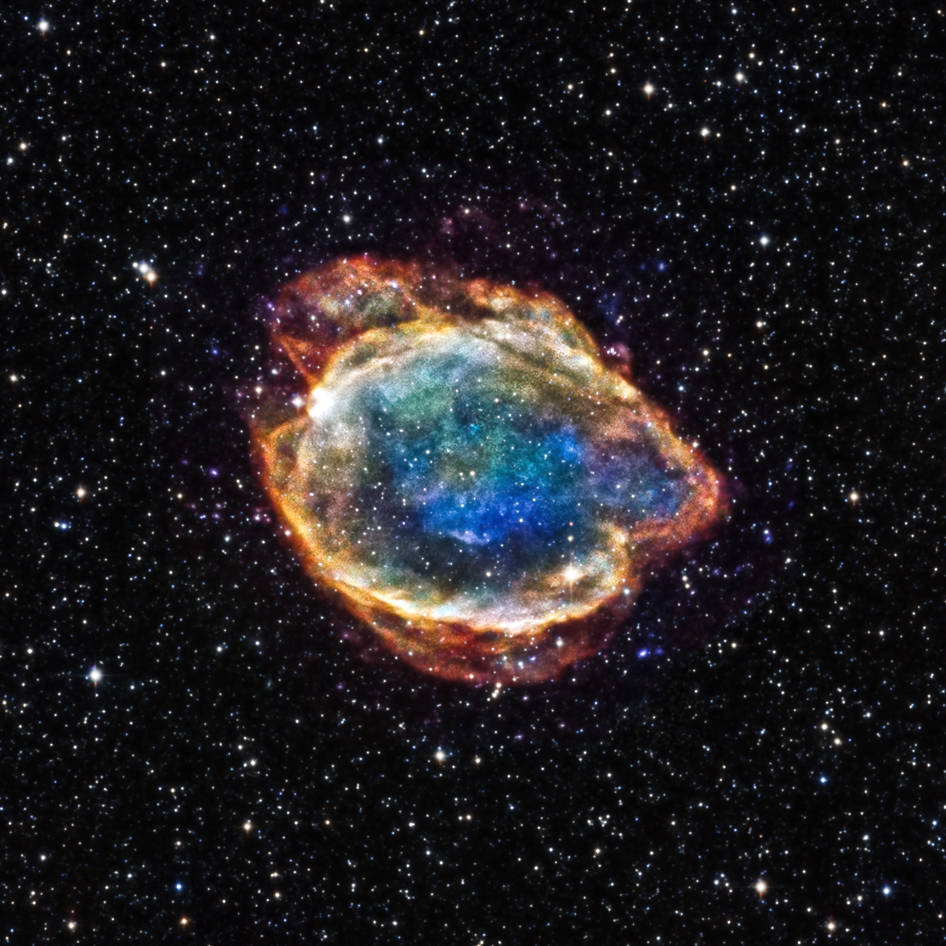
The supernova remnant G299.2-2.9

=== Type Ia supernova observations ===
In May 2019, Dark Energy Survey team published their first cosmology results using Type Ia supernovae. The supernova data was from DES-SN3YR. The Dark Energy Survey team found Ωm = 0.331 ± 0.038 with a flat ΛCDM model and Ωm = 0.321 ± 0.018, w = −0.978 ± 0.059 with a flat wCDM model. Analyzing the same data from DES-SN3YR, they also found a new current Hubble constant, $H_0= 67.1 \pm1.3\,\mathrm{km\,s^{-1}\,Mpc^{-1}}$. This result has an excellent agreement with the Hubble constant measurement from Planck Satellite Collaboration in 2018. In June 2019, there a follow-up paper was published by DES team discussing the systematic uncertainties, and validation of using the supernovae to measure the cosmology results mentioned before. The team also published their photometric pipeline and light curve data in another paper published in the same month.

=== Minor planets ===
Several minor planets were discovered by DeCam in the course of The Dark Energy Survey, including high-inclination trans-Neptunian objects (TNOs).

List of DES discovered minor planets
Numbered MP designation	Discovery date	MP list link	Ref
(451657) 2012 WD36	19 November 2012	list	
(471954) 2013 RM98	8 September 2013	list	
(472262) 2014 QN441	18 August 2014	list	
(483002) 2014 QS441	19 August 2014	list	
(491767) 2012 VU113	15 November 2012	list	
(491768) 2012 VV113	15 November 2012	list	
(495189) 2012 VR113	28 September 2012	list	
(495190) 2012 VS113	12 November 2012	list	
(495297) 2013 TJ159	13 October 2013	list	
Discoveries are credited either to "DECam" or "Dark Energy Survey".

The MPC has assigned the IAU code W84 for DeCam's observations of small Solar System bodies. As of October 2019, the MPC inconsistently credits the discovery of nine numbered minor planets, all of them trans-Neptunian objects, to either "DeCam" or "Dark Energy Survey". The list does not contain any unnumbered minor planets potentially discovered by DeCam, as discovery credits are only given upon a body's numbering, which in turn depends on a sufficiently secure orbit determination.

== Gallery ==
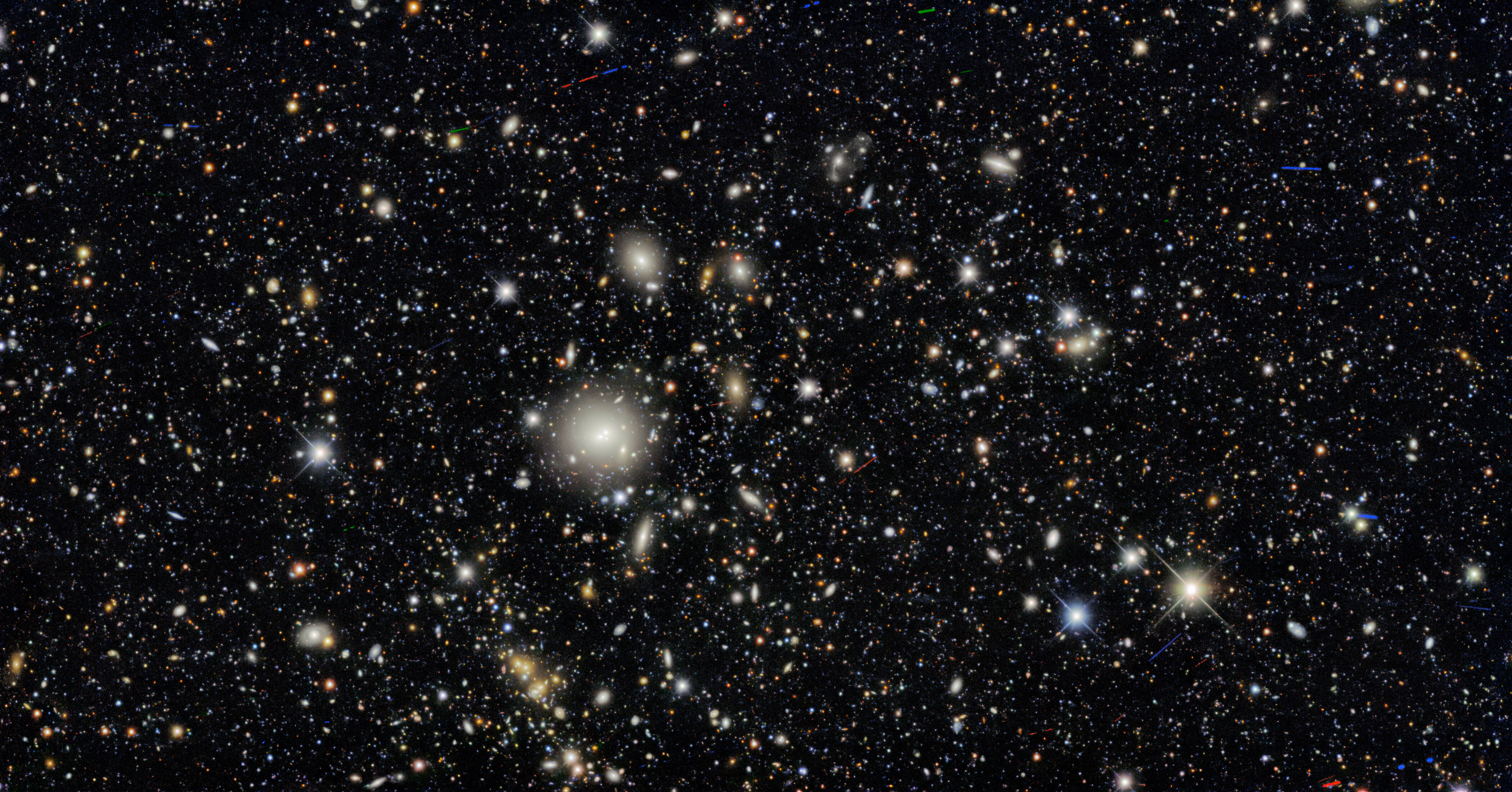
Dark Energy Survey deep field image

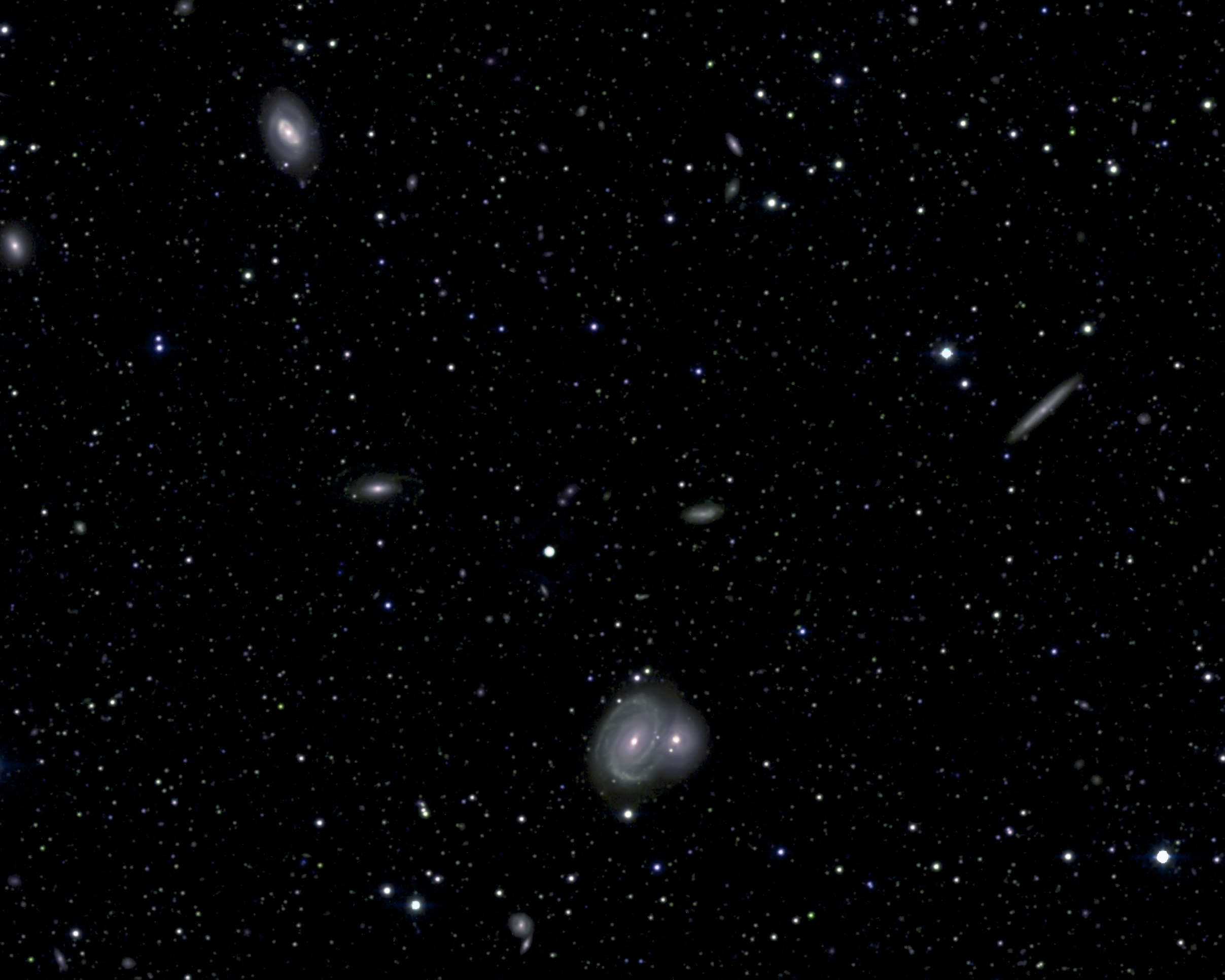
The large spiral galaxy in the center of this image is roughly 385 million light-years from Earth.

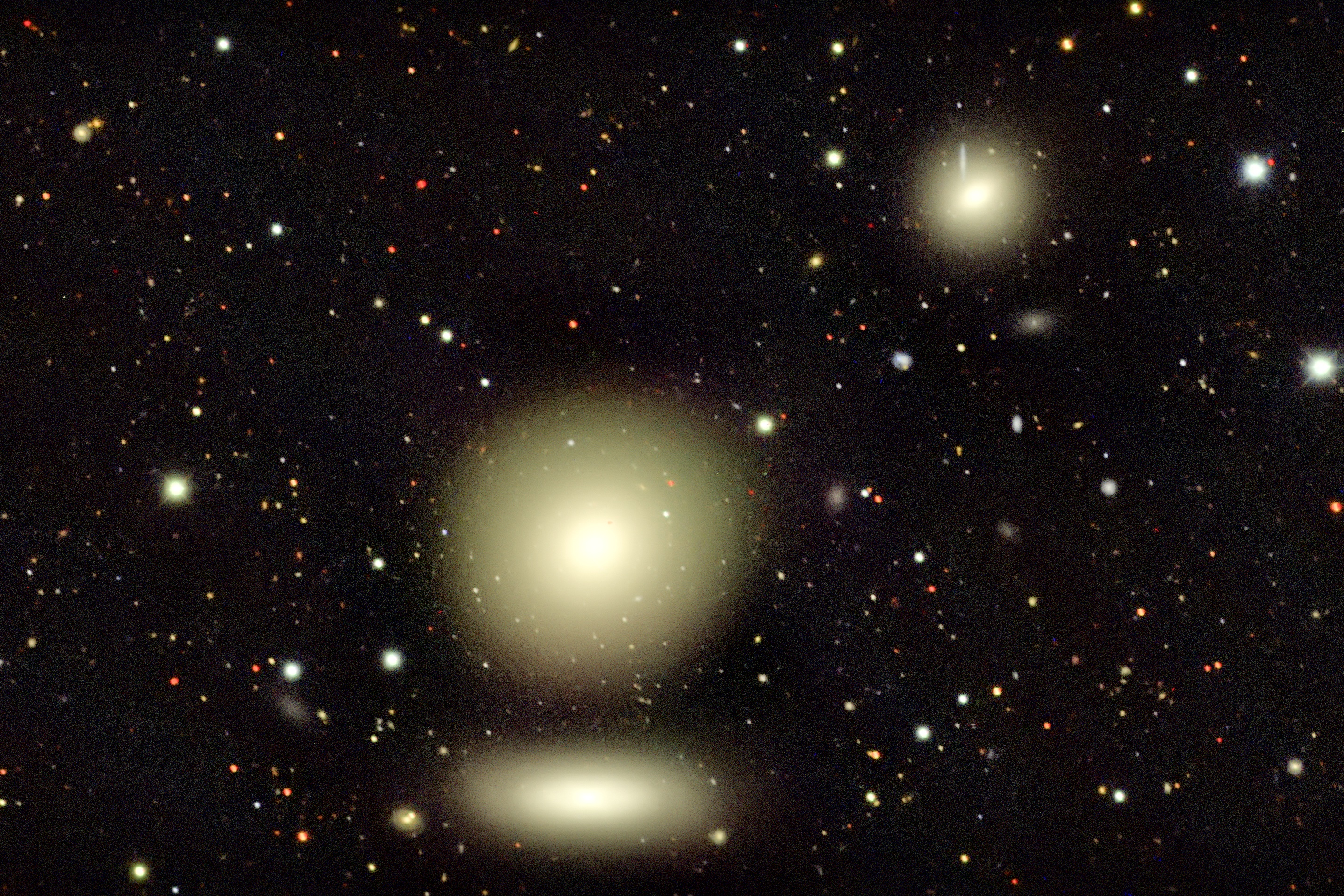
The three large objects in this image captured by the Dark Energy Camera are galaxies in the nearby Fornax cluster, roughly 65 million light-years from Earth.

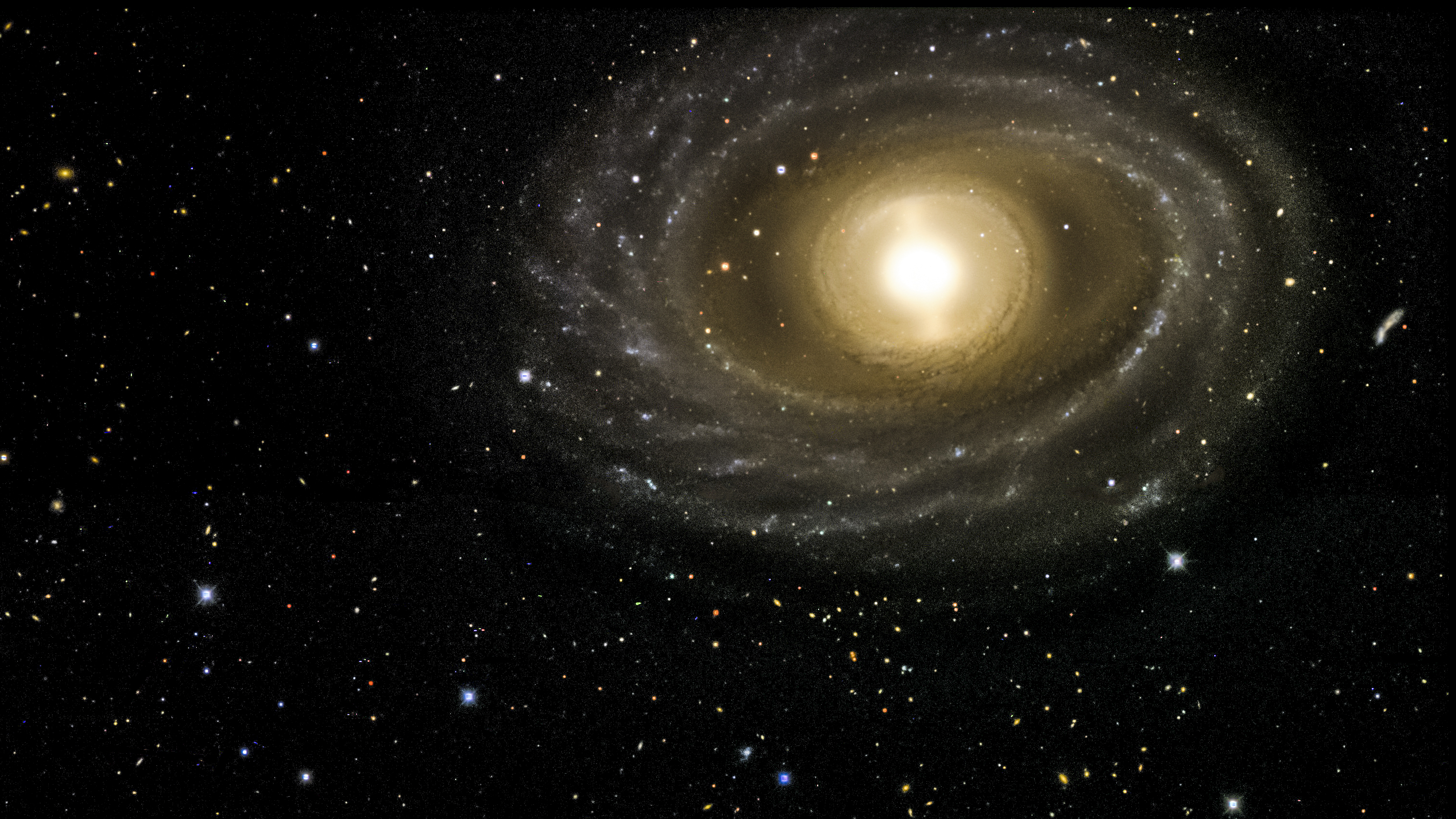
Dark Energy Survey - galaxy NGC 1398

== See also ==
- Cosmic Evolution Survey
- Dark Energy Spectroscopic Instrument (DESI)
