= NGC 895 =

Galaxy in the constellation Cetus

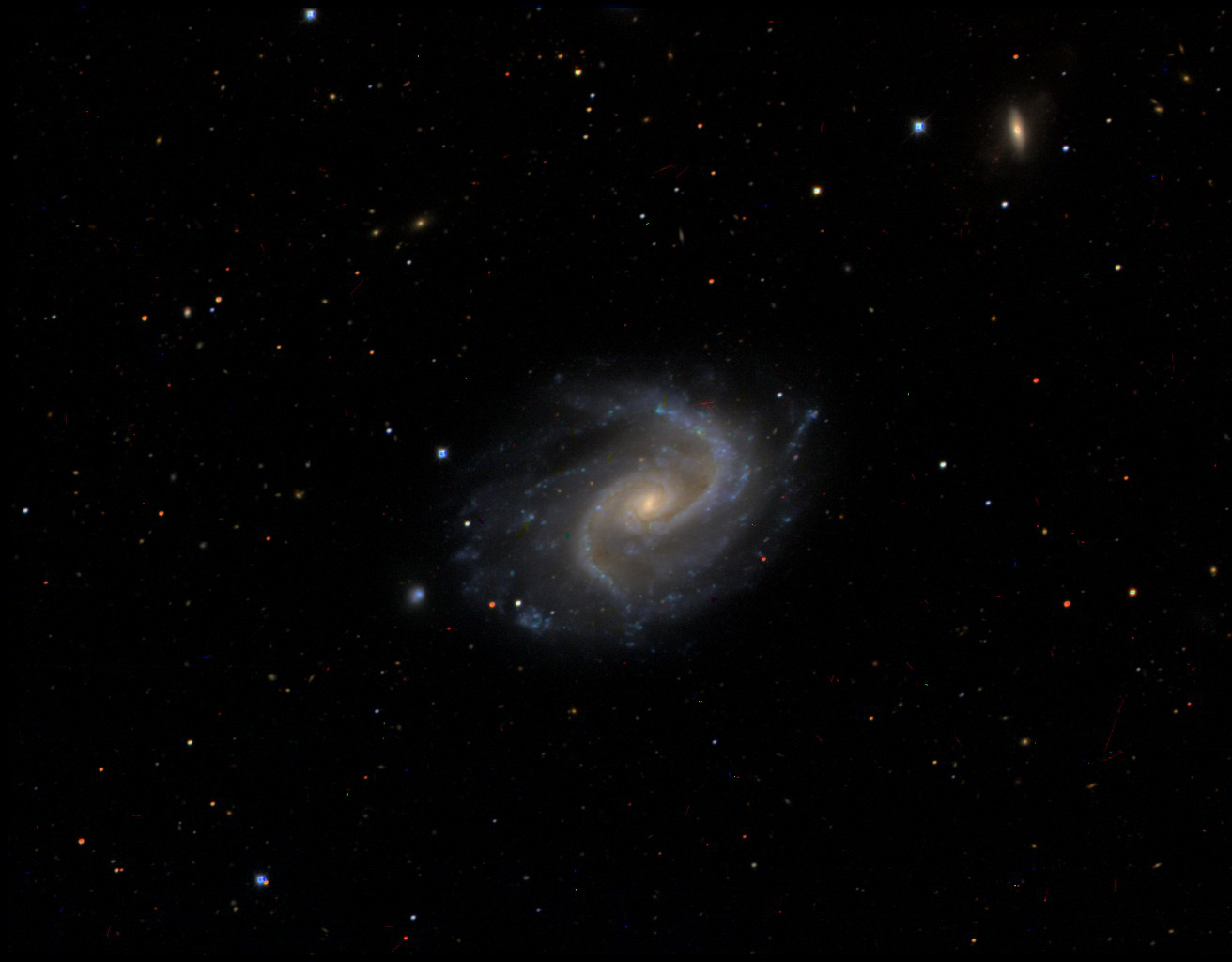
- NGC 895 imaged by the Dark Energy Survey

Observation data (J2000 epoch)
- Constellation: Cetus
- Right ascension: 02^{h} 21^{m} 36.20^{s}
- Declination: −5° 31′ 13.00″
- Redshift: 0.007635±0.000017
- Distance: 98 Mly (30.15 Mpc)
- Apparent magnitude (V): 11.73

Characteristics
- Type: SA(s)cd
- Size: 85,500 ly
- Apparent size (V): 3.236′ × 2.188′

Other designations
- PGC 8974, AGC 420070, GSC 04697-01007, MCG-01-07-002, LEDA 8974

NGC 895 is an unbarred spiral galaxy located around 98 million light-years away in the constellation Cetus. NGC 895 was discovered November 28, 1856 by R. J. Mitchell. NGC 895 is not known to have much star-formation, and is not known to have an active galactic nuclei.

== See also ==
- List of NGC objects (1–1000)
