= Stripe 82 =

Stripe 82 is a 300 deg^{2} equatorial field of sky that was imaged multiple times by the Sloan Digital Sky Survey from 2000 to 2008. It approximately covers the region with right ascension from 20:00h to 4:00h and declination from -1.26° to +1.26°.

Stripe 82 has also been observed using many other telescopes and instruments, a list of which is given below.

== Current data available on Stripe 82 ==
=== Imaging ===
Optical/UV Imaging

- SDSS Co-adds (Jiang, LSST, Huff, Annis)
- CFHT i-band ('CS82)
- CFHTLS
- DES
- HSC
- GALEX

Near-IR

- UKIDSS
- VHS
- NEWFIRM (Jiang)
- VICS82 (CFHT and VISTA)

Mid-IR

- SHELA
- SpIES
- WISE
- IRAC High-z quasars

Far-IR

- HELMS
- vHerS

Radio/mm

- VLA-L (Hodge et al. 2011, Heywood et al. 2016)
- VLA-S (Hallinan)
- ACT
- ASKAP Variables and Slow Transients (VAST; Murphy et al. 2013, Murphy et al. 2021)

X-ray

- Chandra (LaMassa)
- XMM (LaMassa)
- Swift

=== Spectra ===
- SDSS-DR7
- SDSS-DR10
- HETDEX
- Wigglez
- VVDS
- PRIMUS
- DEEP2
- VIPERS
