= NGC 5681 =

Galaxy in the constellation Boötes

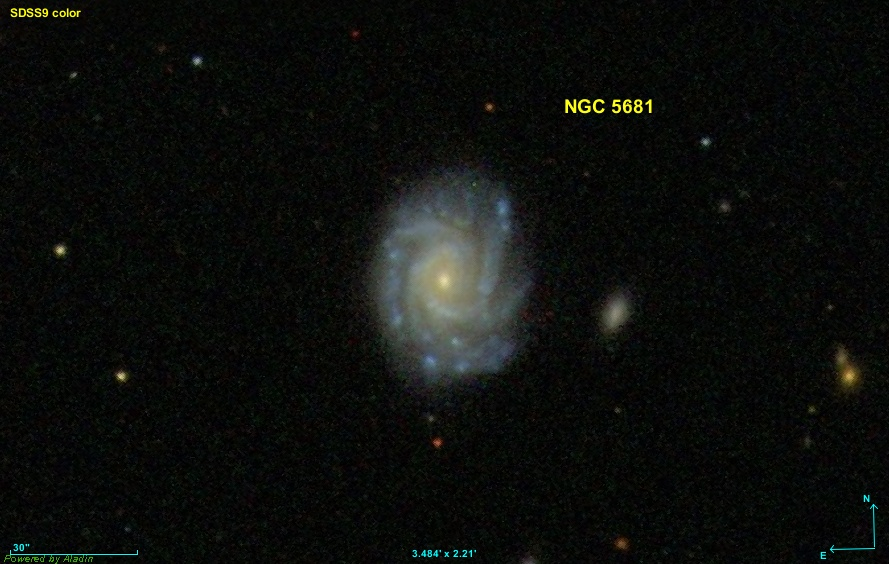
- NGC 5681 imaged by SDSS

Observation data (J2000 epoch)
- Constellation: Boötes
- Right ascension: 14^{h} 35^{m} 42.9043^{s}
- Declination: +08° 18′ 02.313″
- Redshift: 0.026488±0.000009
- Heliocentric radial velocity: 7,941±3 km/s
- Distance: 331.21 ± 89.53 Mly (101.550 ± 27.450 Mpc)
- Apparent magnitude (V): 14.3

Characteristics
- Type: SA:(rs)bc
- Size: ~109,700 ly (33.63 kpc) (estimated)
- Apparent size (V): 0.9′ × 0.6′

Other designations
- IRAS 14332+0831, UGC 9393, MCG +02-37-025, PGC 52169, CGCG 075-083 NED02

NGC 5681 is a spiral galaxy in the constellation of Boötes. Its velocity with respect to the cosmic microwave background is 8,164±16 km/s, which corresponds to a Hubble distance of 392.7 ± 27.5 Mly (120.41 ± 8.43 Mpc). However, two non-redshift measurements give a closer distance of 331.21 ± 89.53 Mly (101.550 ± 27.450 Mpc). It was discovered by German astronomer Heinrich d'Arrest on 1 May 1865.

NGC 5681 is a radio galaxy, i.e. it has giant regions of radio emission extending well beyond its visible structure.

== Supernovae ==
Two supernovae have been observed in NGC 5681:

- SN 2006dt (Type Ia, mag. 16.8) was discovered by the Lick Observatory Supernova Search (LOSS) on 20 July 2006.
- SN 2026qua (Type Ib, mag. 19.378) was discovered by the Zwicky Transient Facility on 30 June 2026.

== See also ==
- List of NGC objects (5001–6000)
