= NGC 1398 =

Galaxy in the constellation Fornax

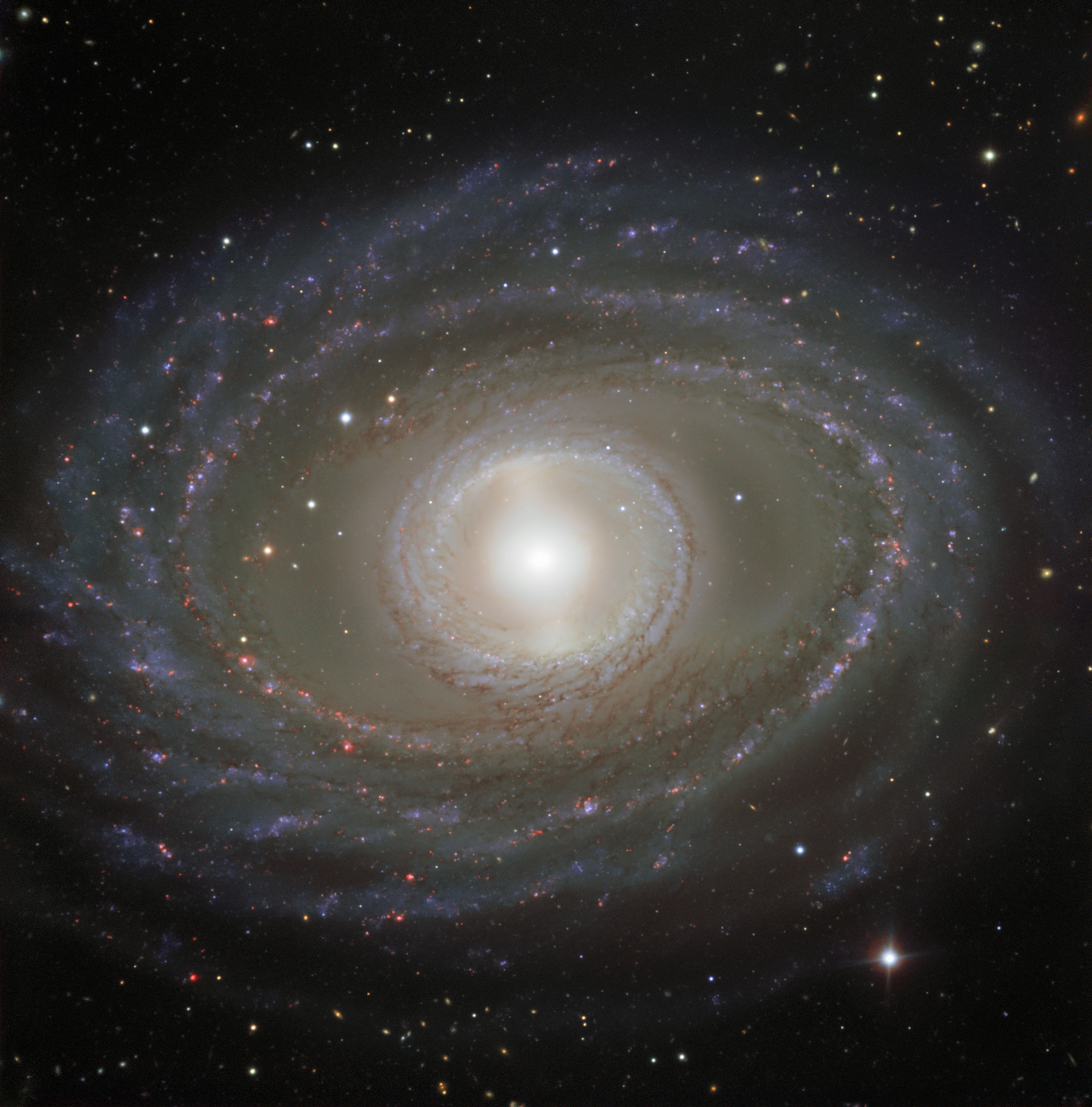
- NGC 1398 imaged by FORS2 instrument at ESO's VLT.

Observation data (J2000 epoch)
- Constellation: Fornax
- Right ascension: 03^{h} 38^{m} 52.0633^{s}
- Declination: −26° 20′ 15.583″
- Redshift: 0.004657
- Distance: 61.8 ± 4.3 Mly (18.96 ± 1.33 Mpc)
- Apparent magnitude (V): 10.63

Characteristics
- Type: (R')SB(r)ab
- Size: ~291,900 ly (89.51 kpc) (estimated)
- Apparent size (V): 7.1′ × 5.4′

Other designations
- ESO 482-22, IRAS 03367-2629, MCG -04-09-040, PGC 13434

NGC 1398 is an isolated barred spiral galaxy exhibiting a double ring structure. It is located 65 million light years from the Earth, in the constellation of Fornax. The galaxy, with a diameter of approximately 135,000 light years, is bigger than the Milky Way. Over 100 billion stars are in the galaxy. The discovery credit for NGC 1398 is often given to Friedrich Winnecke of Karlsruhe, Germany, who observed it on 17 December 1868, while he was searching for comets. German astronomer Wilhelm Tempel had first observed it on 9 October 1861, but he did not publish his observation until 1882.

== Supernovae ==
Two supernovae have been observed in NGC 1398:

- SN 1996N (Type Ib/c, mag. 16) was discovered by the Perth Astronomical Research Group on 12 March 1996.
- SN 2025zi (Type Iax [02cx-like], mag. 20.07) was discovered by BlackGEM on 21 January 2025.

== Gallery ==
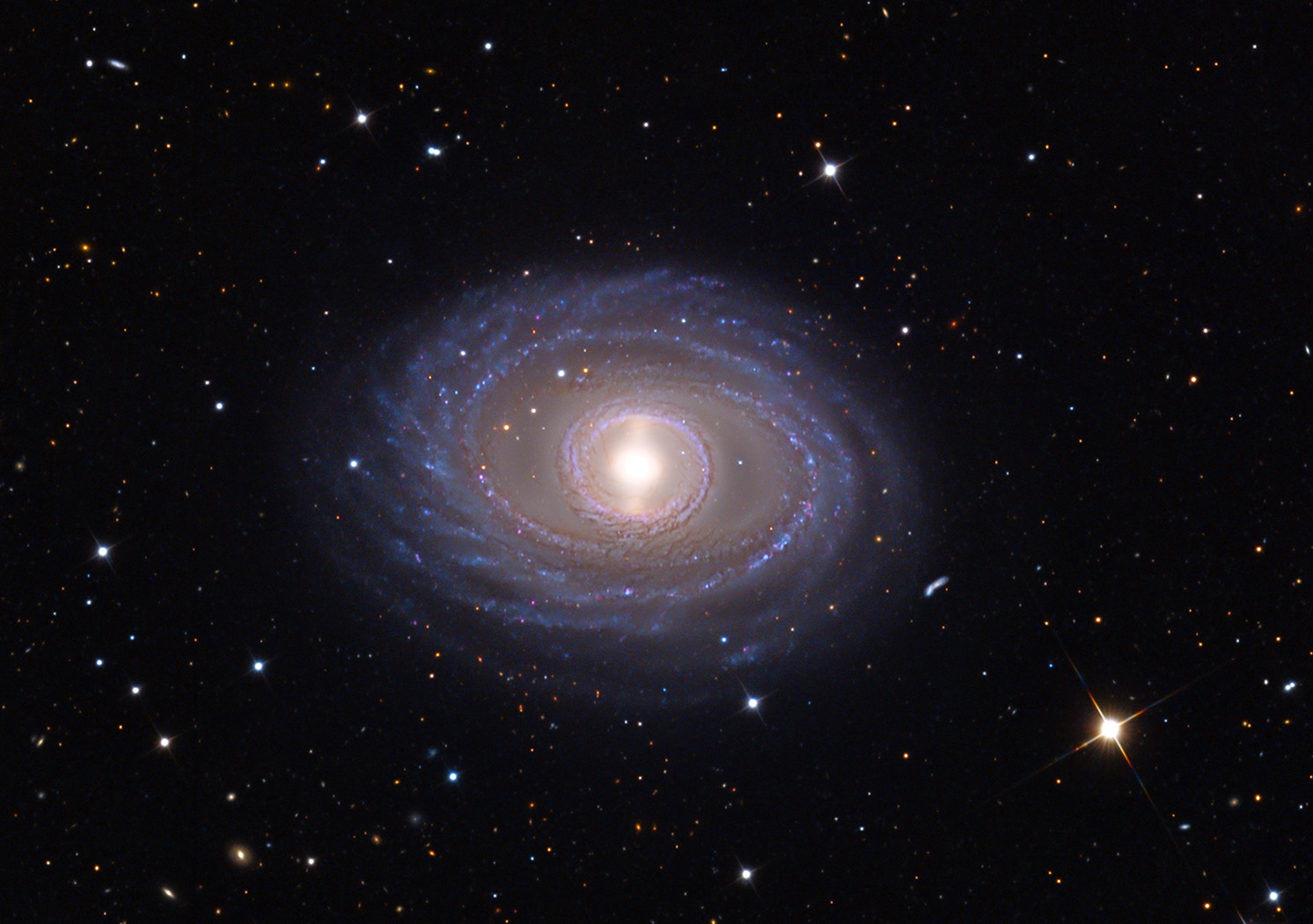
NGC 1398 imaged by the Mount Lemmon Observatory

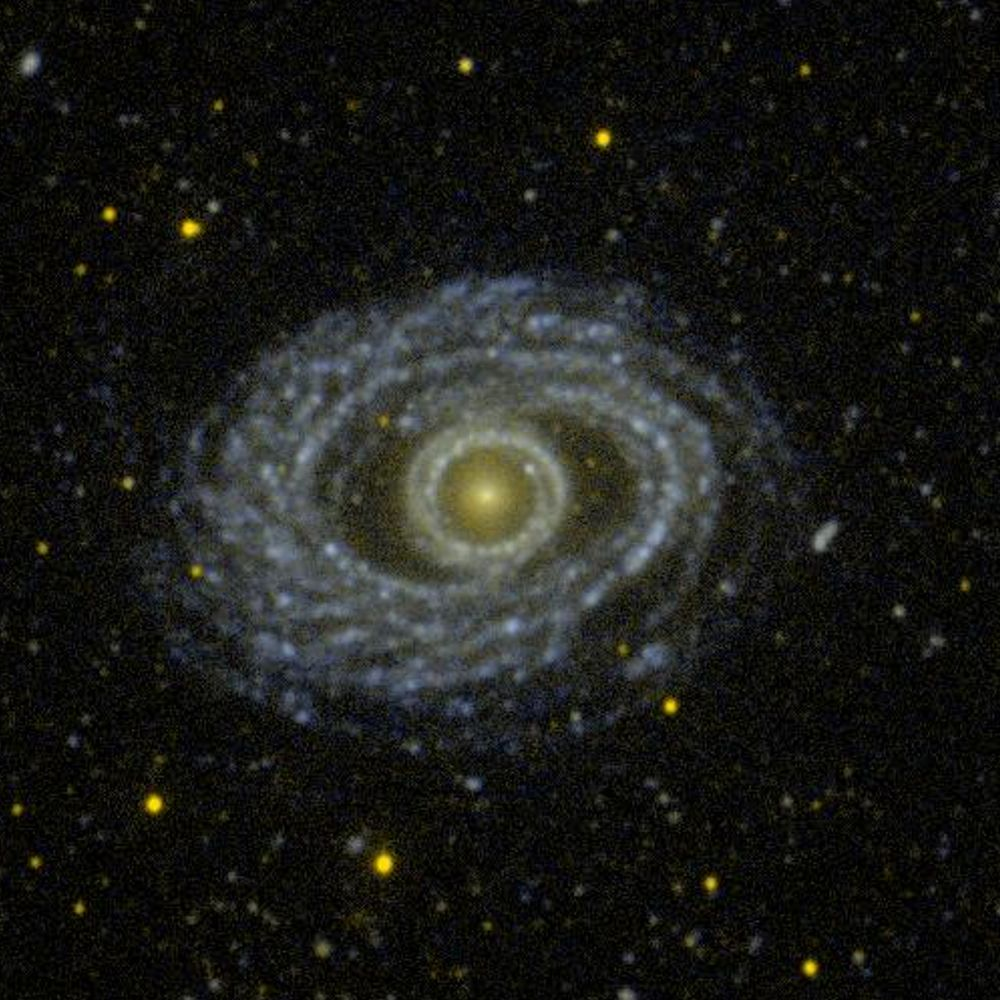
NGC 1398 imaged by GALEX

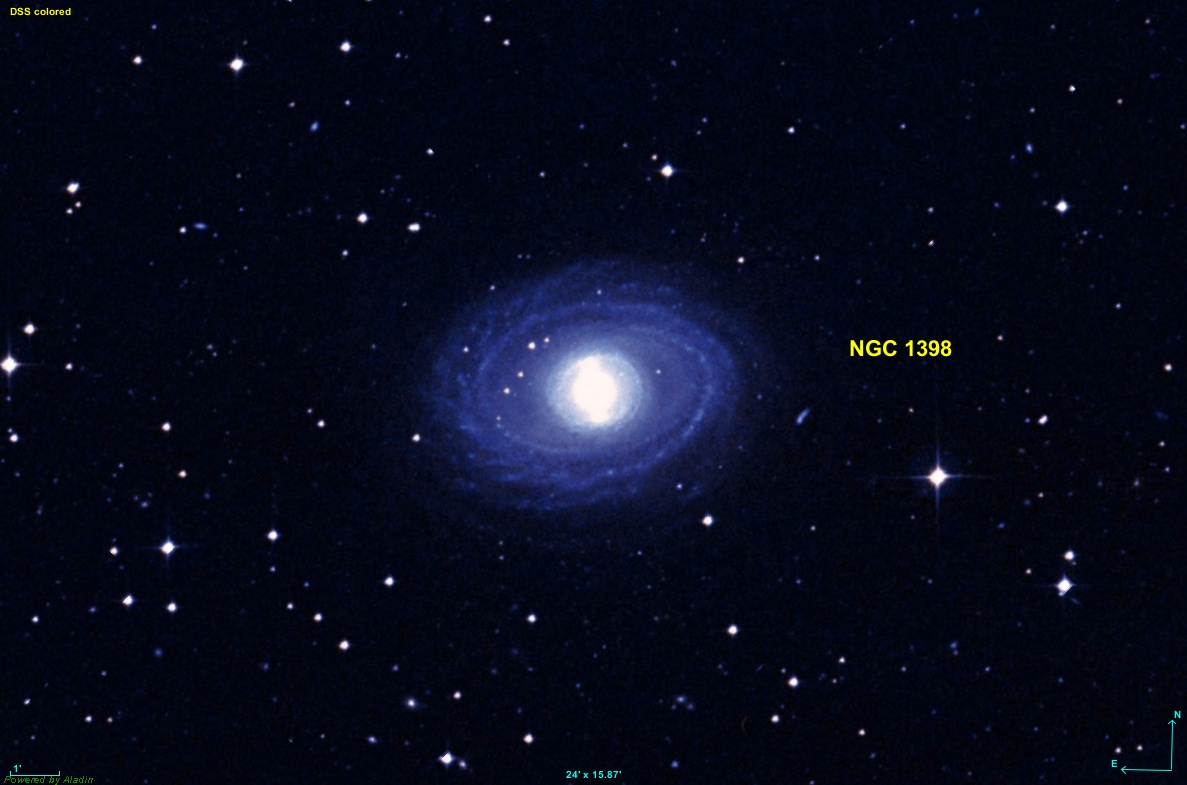
DSS image of NGC 1398

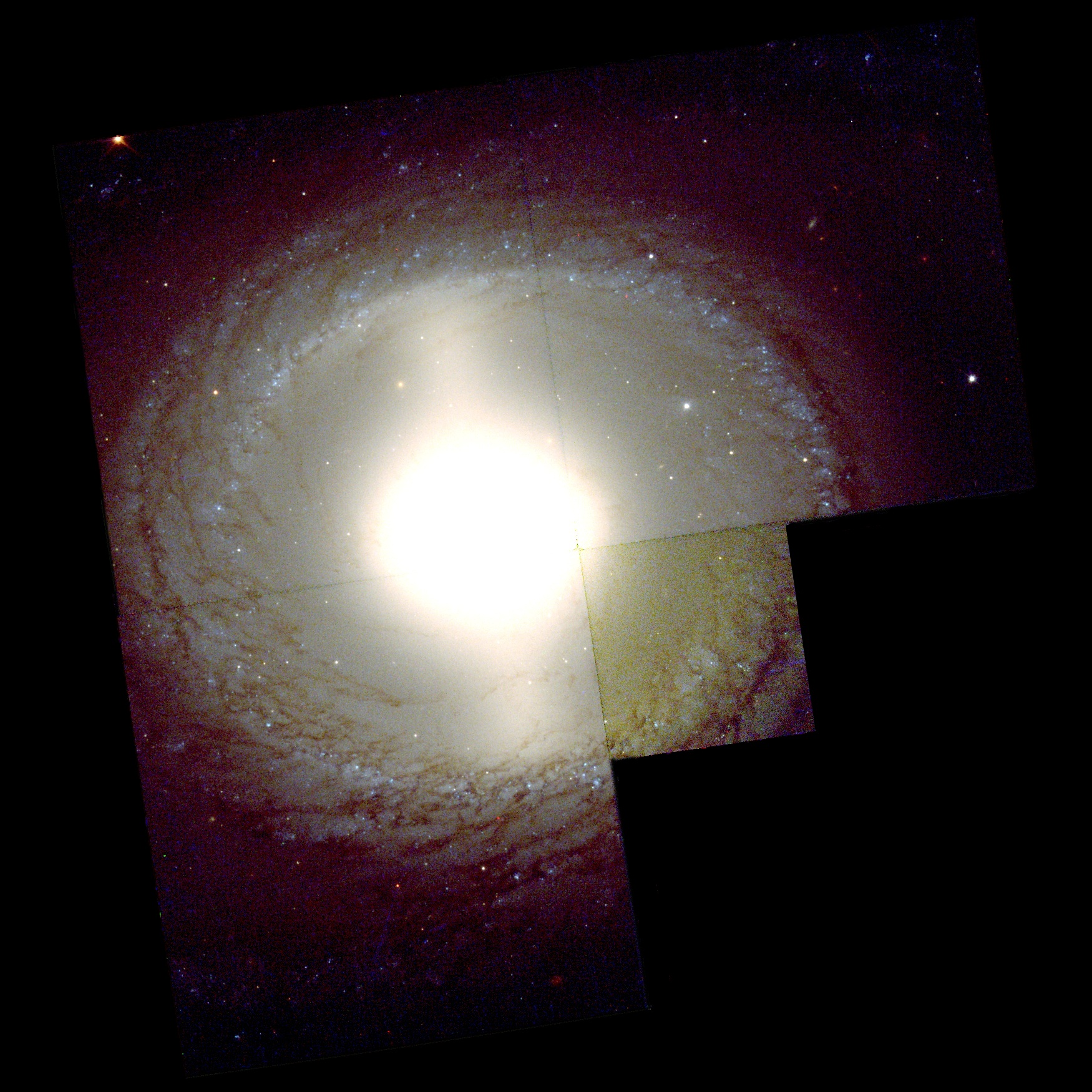
NGC 1398 imaged by the Hubble Space Telescope

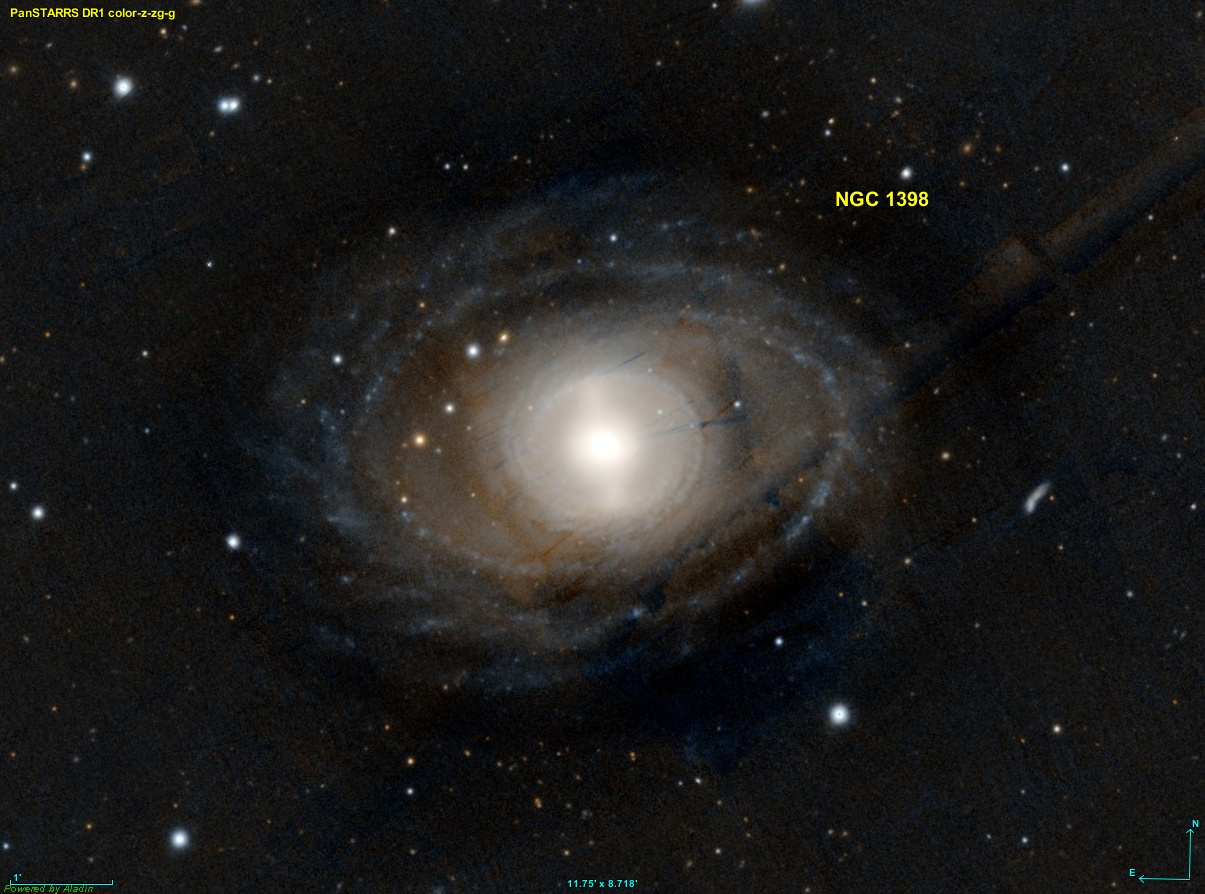
NGC 1398 imaged by Pan-STARRS

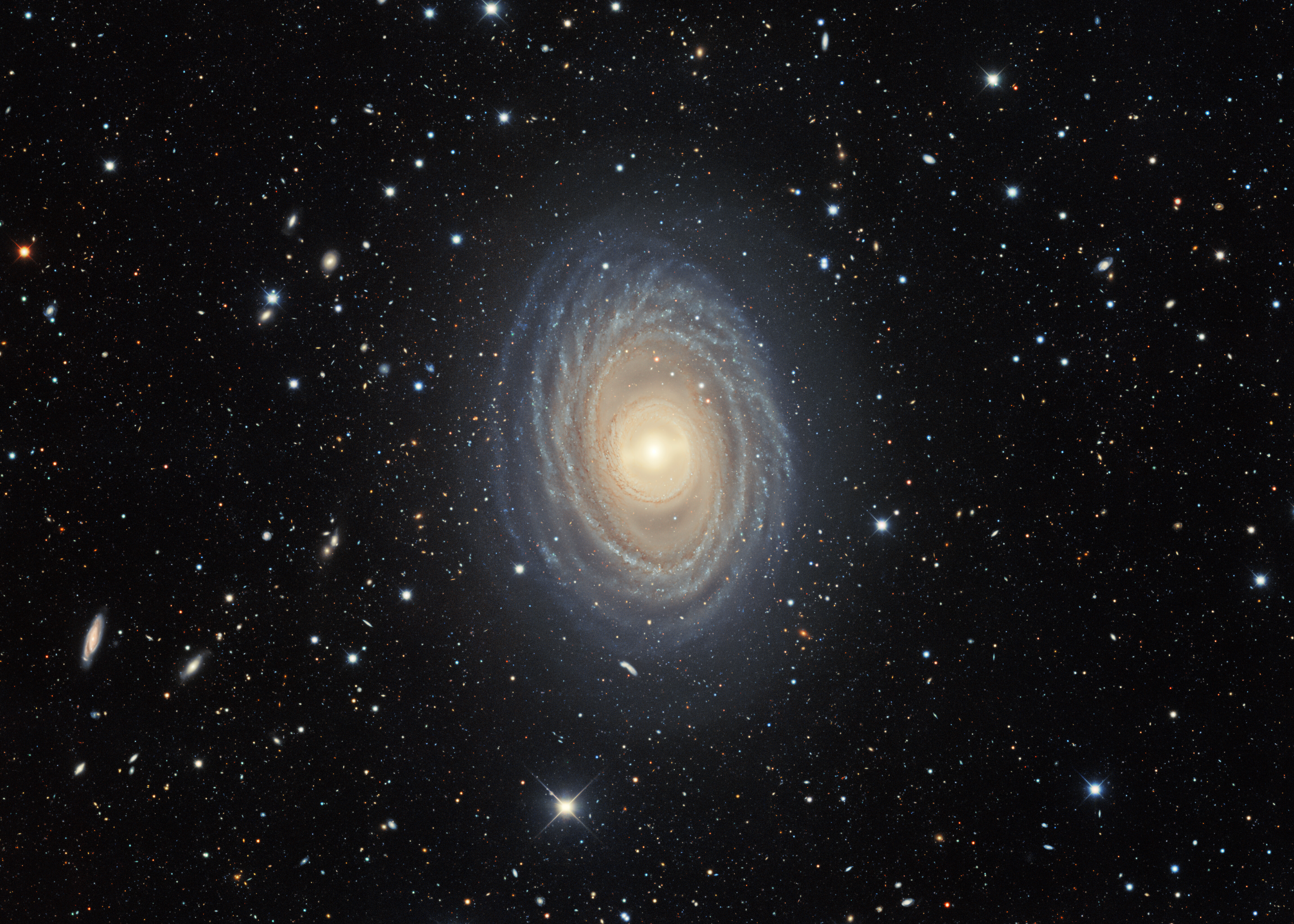
NGC 1398 imaged by Dark Energy Survey

== See also ==
- List of NGC objects (1001–2000)
