= G299.2-2.9 =

Supernova remnant in the Milky Way

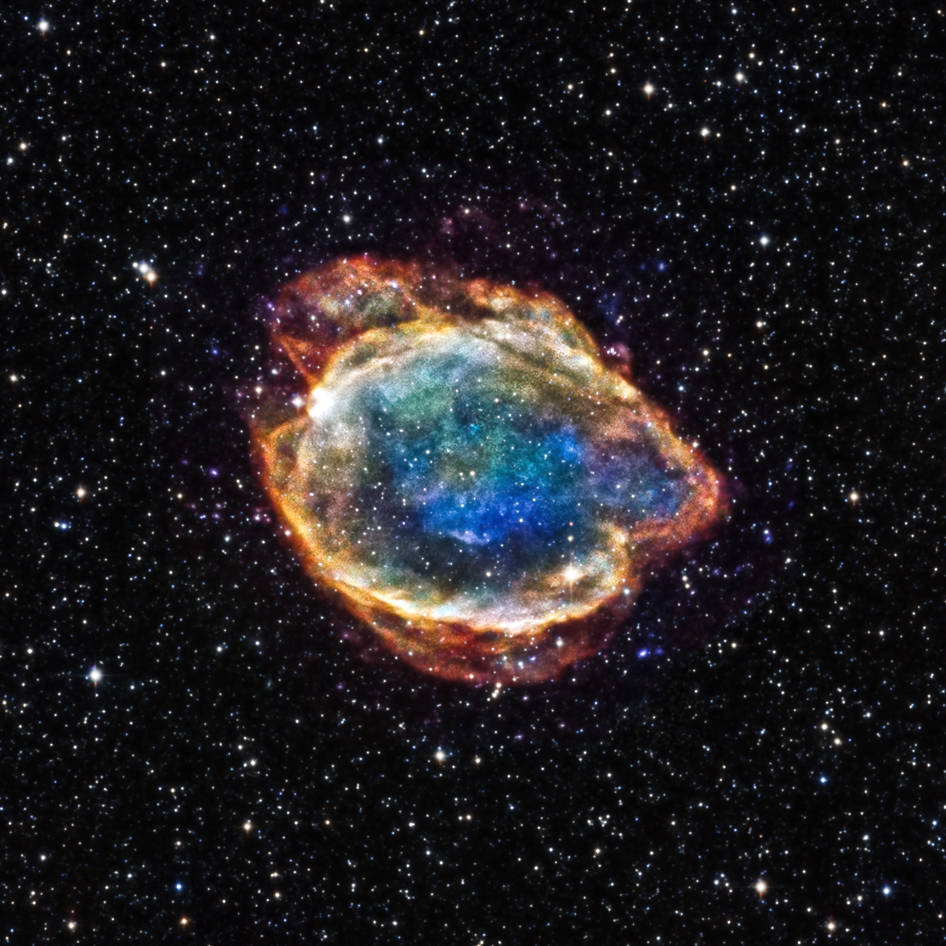
- Shell structure of G299.2-2.9
- Event type: Supernova remnant
- SN Ia
- Constellation: Musca
- Right ascension: 12^{h} 15^{m} 13.0^{s}
- Declination: −65° 30′ 00″
- Epoch: J2000
- Distance: 16,000 ly
- Remnant: Mixed Morphology
- Host: Milky Way
- Notable features: Complex outer shell structure
- Other designations: SNR G299.2-02.9
- Related media on Commons

G299.2-2.9 is a supernova remnant in the Milky Way, 16,000 light years from Earth. It is the remains of a Type Ia supernova. The observed radius of the remnant shell translates to approximately 4,500 years of expansion, making it one of the oldest observed Type Ia supernova remnants.

== Description ==
G299.2-2.9 gives astronomers an opportunity to study how supernova remnants evolve and warp over time. G299.2-2.9 also provides a glimpse of the explosion that produced it. G299.2-2.9 is split into several distinct and different regions: an almost complete bubble interrupted only by a blow-out, a bright center, a complex "knot" region on the northeastern edge of the bubble structure and a diffuse emission extending beyond the main structure. It has been heavily documented by multiple satellites and in-orbit telescopes, including the Hubble Space Telescope, Spitzer Telescope, and Chandra.

The small X-ray emission from the deep portions of G299.2-2.9 shows large quantities of iron and silicon, which indicates that it is a remnant of a Type Ia supernova. The outer "shell" is large and complex, with a multi-shell structure. Outer shells similar to G299.2-2.9 are usually not associated with exploded stars. Since theories about Type Ia supernovae assume they go off in a specified environment, detailed studies of the outer "shell" of G299.2-2.9 have helped astronomers improve their understanding of the areas and situations where thermonuclear explosions occur.

== Gallery ==
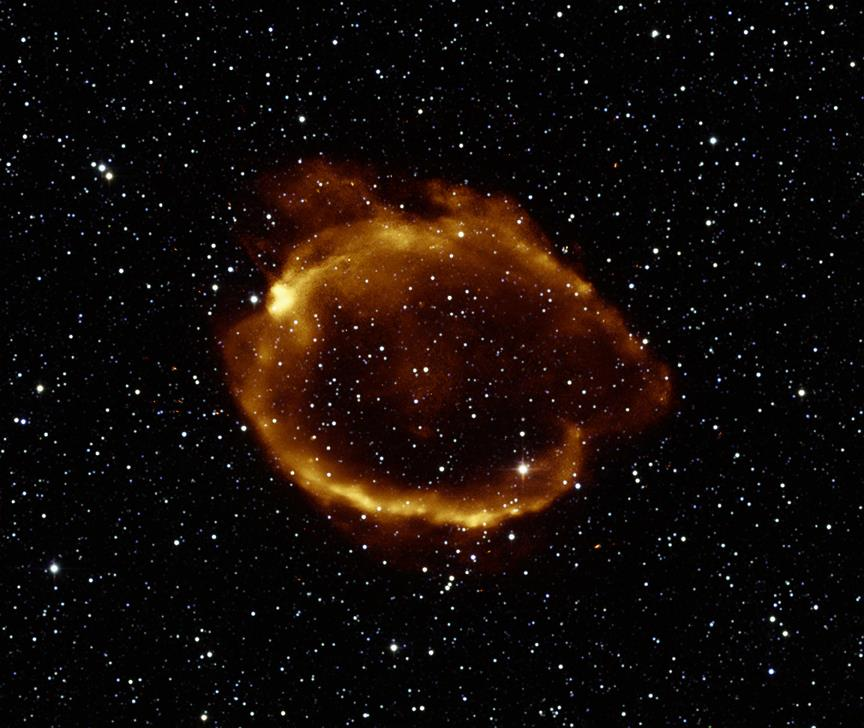
Composite image using X-ray light from Chandra (orange) that has been overlaid on an infrared image from 2MASS.

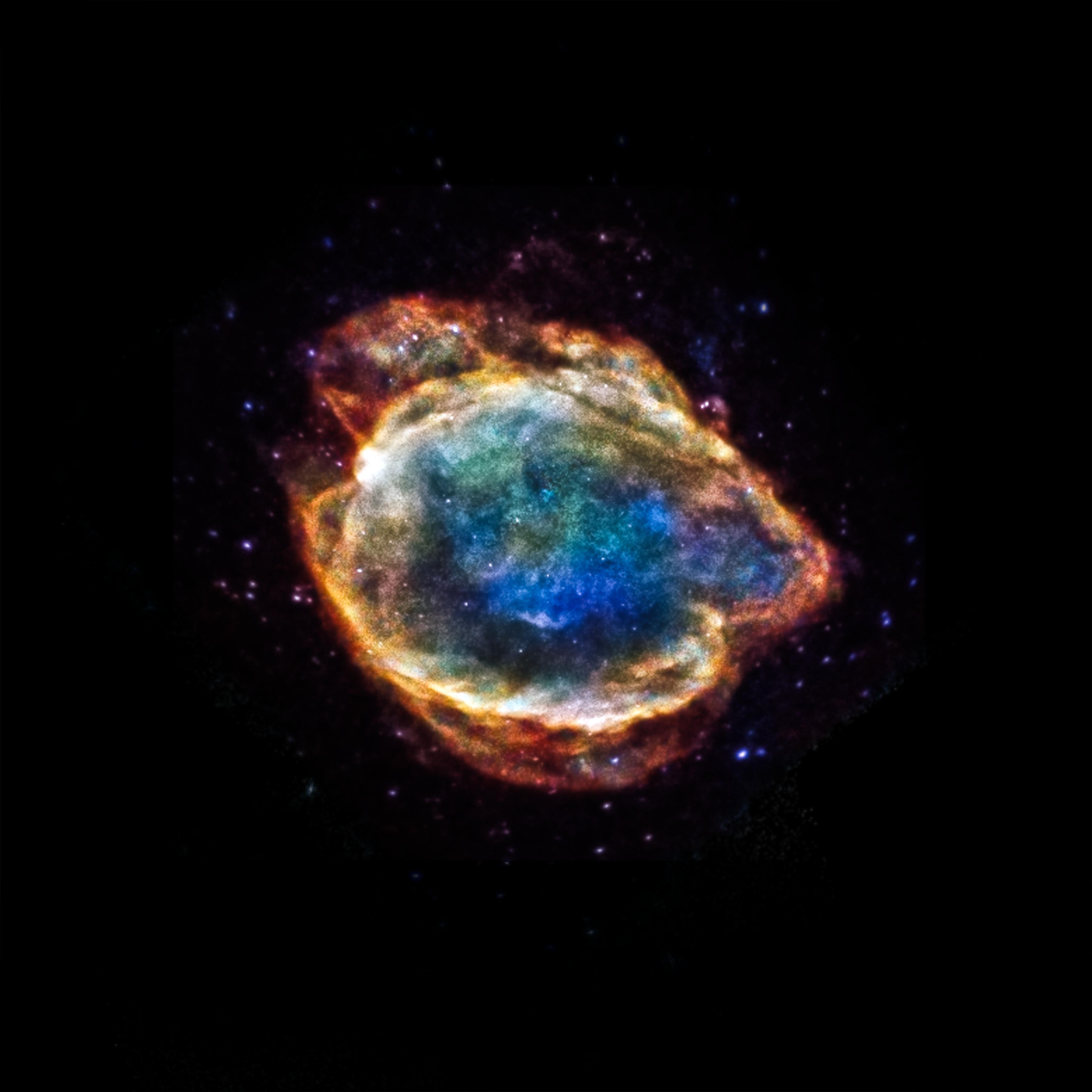
Red, green and blue represent low, medium and high-energy X-rays – Chandra.

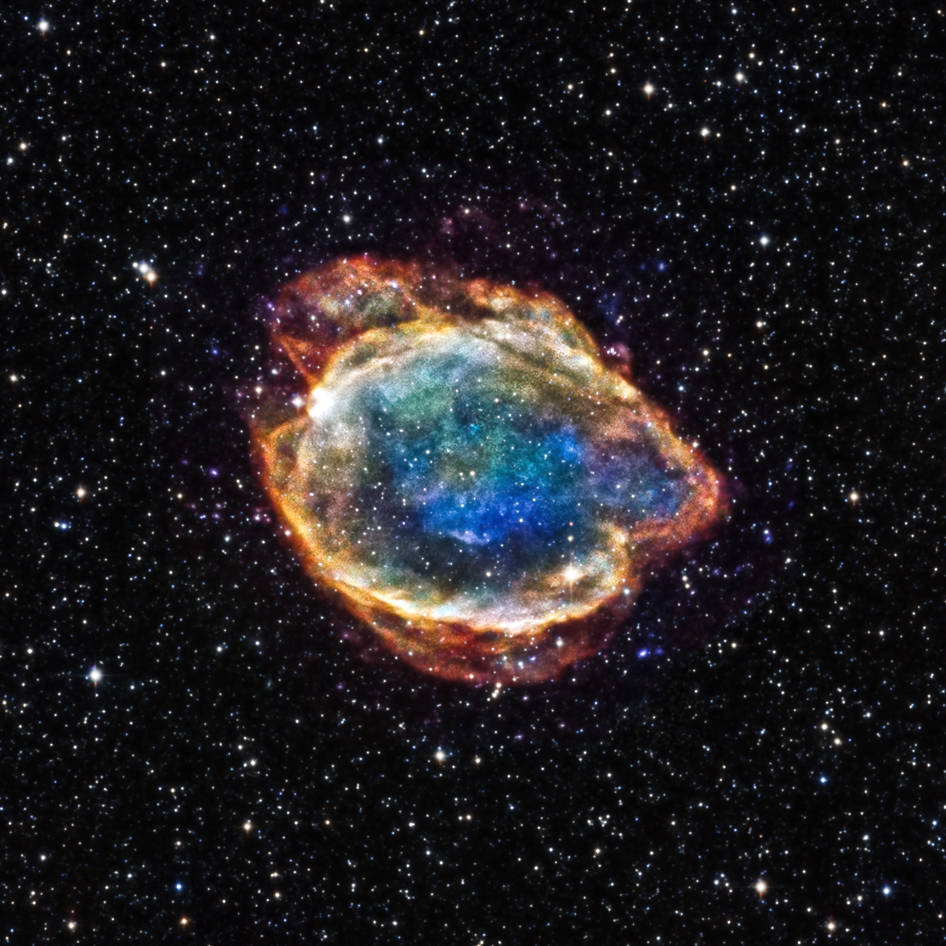
Chandra X-ray Observatory – NASA.
