= Sloan Digital Sky Survey =

Multi-spectral imaging and spectroscopic redshift survey

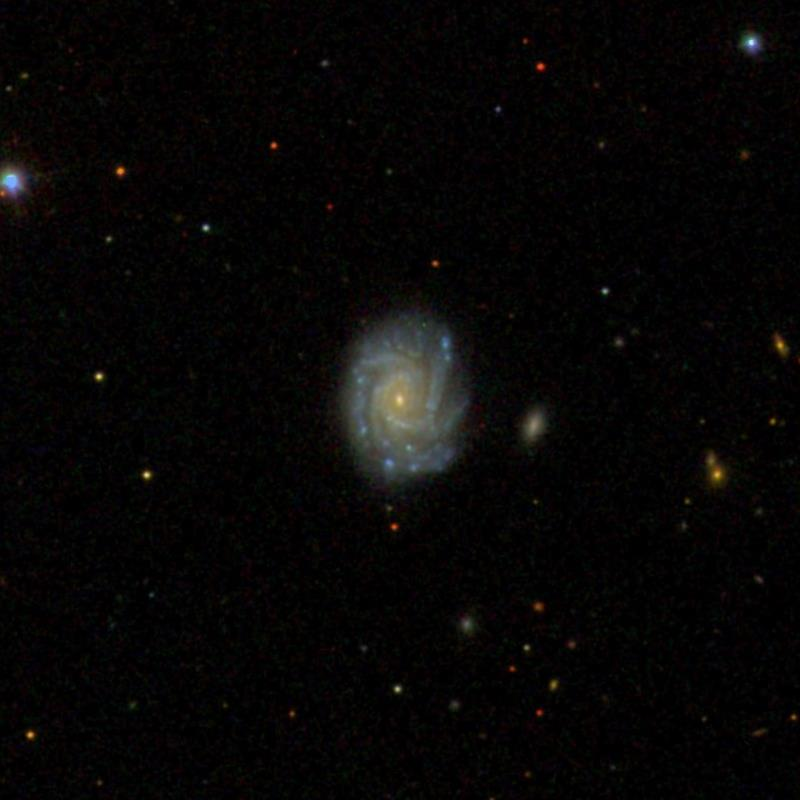
- NGC 5681, a galaxy that was imaged during the survey
- Alternative names: SDSS
- Coordinates: 32°46′50″N 105°49′14″W
- Website: www.sdss.org
- Related media on Commons

The Sloan Digital Sky Survey (SDSS) is a major multi-spectral imaging and spectroscopic redshift survey using a dedicated 2.5-m wide-angle optical telescope at Apache Point Observatory in New Mexico, United States. The project was named after the Alfred P. Sloan Foundation, which contributed significant funding. Data collection began in 2000.

A consortium of the University of Washington and Princeton University was established to conduct a redshift survey. The Astrophysical Research Consortium (ARC) was established in 1984 with the additional participation of New Mexico State University and Washington State University to manage activities at Apache Point. In 1991, the Sloan Foundation granted the ARC funding for survey efforts and the construction of equipment to carry out the work.

== Background ==
At the time of its design, the SDSS was a pioneering combination of novel instrumentation as well as data reduction and storage techniques that drove major advances in astronomical observations, discoveries, and theory.

The SDSS project was centered around two instruments and data processing pipelines that were groundbreaking for the scale at which they were implemented:

1. A multi-filter/multi-array scanning CCD camera to take an imaging survey of the sky at high efficiency, followed by
2. A multi-object/multi-fiber spectrograph that could take spectra in bulk (several hundred objects at a time) of targets identified from the survey

A major new challenge was how to deal with the exceptional data volume generated by the telescope and instruments. At the time, hundreds of gigabytes of raw data per night was unprecedented, and a collaborating team as complex as the original hardware and engineering team was needed to design a software and storage system for processing the data. From each imaging run, object catalogs, reduced images, and associated files were produced in a highly automated pipeline, yielding the largest astronomical object catalogs (billions of objects) available in digital queryable form at the time. For each spectral run, thousands of two-dimensional spectral images had to be processed to automatically extract calibrated spectra (flux versus wavelength).

In the approximate decade it took to achieve these goals, SDSS contributed to notable advances in massive database storage and accessing technology, such as SQL, and was one of the first major astronomical projects to make data available in this form. The model of giving the scientific community and public broad and internet-accessible access to the survey data products was also relatively new at the time.

The collaboration model around the project was also complex but successful, given the large numbers of institutions and individuals needed to bring expertise to the system. Universities and foundations were participants along with the managing partner ARC. Other participants included Fermi National Accelerator Laboratory (Fermilab), which supplied computer processing and storage capabilities, and colleagues from the computing industry.

== Operation ==
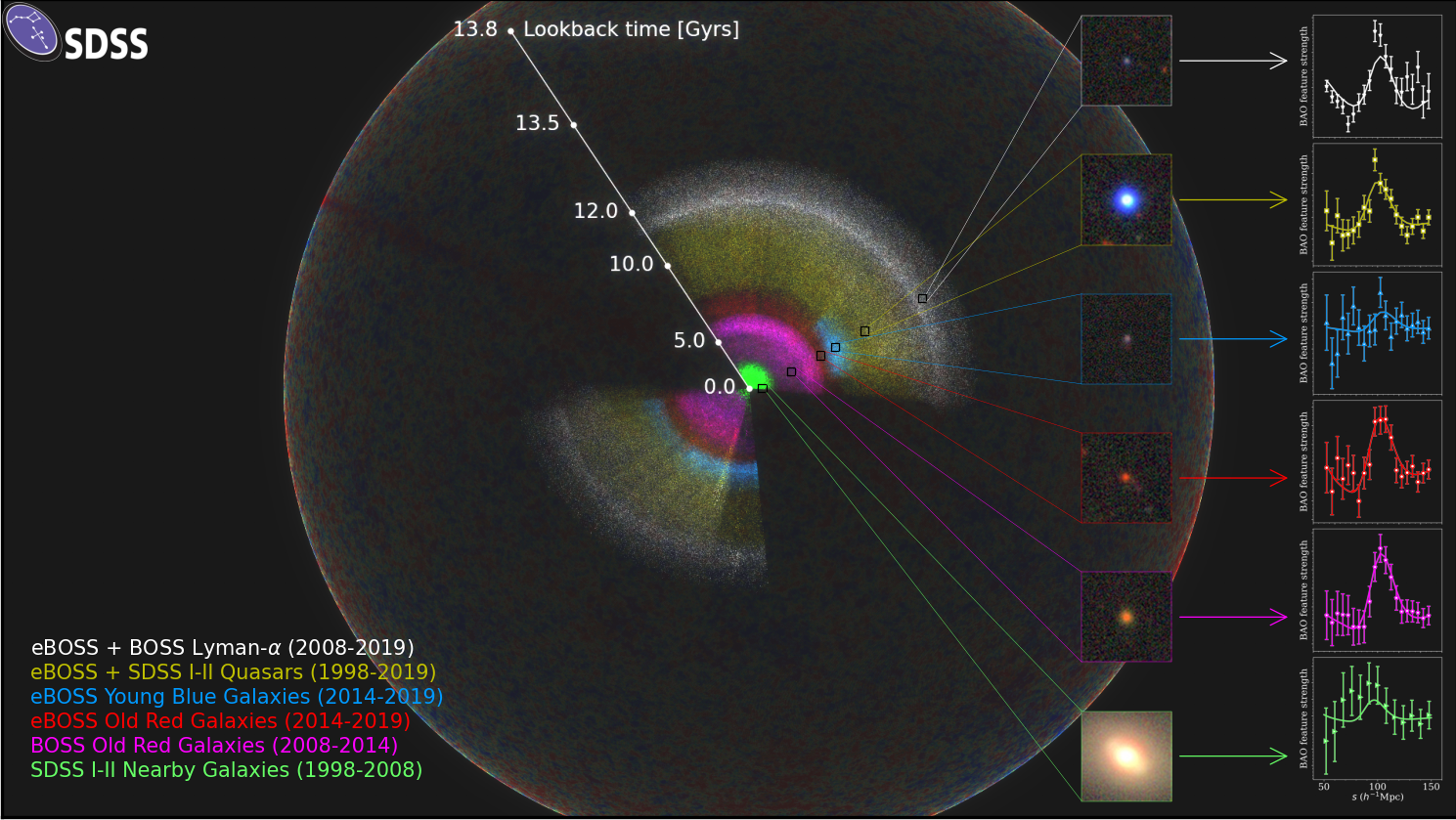
SDSS map shown as a rainbow of colors, located within the observable Universe (the outer sphere, showing fluctuations in the Cosmic Microwave Background). As we look out in distance, we look back in time. So, the location of these signals reveals the expansion rate of the Universe at different times in cosmic history. (2020)

Data collection began in 2000; the final imaging data release (DR9) covers over 35% of the sky, with photometric observations of around nearly 1 billion objects, while the survey continues to acquire spectra, having so far taken spectra of over 4 million objects. The main galaxy sample has a median redshift of z = 0.1; there are redshifts for luminous red galaxies as far as z = 0.7, and for quasars as far as z = 5; and the imaging survey has been involved in the detection of quasars beyond a redshift z = 6.

Data release 8 (DR8), released in January 2011, includes all photometric observations taken with the SDSS imaging camera, covering 14,555 square degrees on the sky (just over 35% of the full sky). Data release 9 (DR9), released to the public on 31 July 2012, includes the first results from the Baryon Oscillation Spectroscopic Survey (BOSS), including over 800,000 new spectra. Over 500,000 of the new spectra are of objects in the Universe 7 billion years ago (roughly half the age of the universe). Data release 10 (DR10), released to the public on 31 July 2013, includes all data from previous releases, plus the first results from the APO Galactic Evolution Experiment (APOGEE), including over 57,000 high-resolution infrared spectra of stars in the Milky Way. DR10 also includes over 670,000 new BOSS spectra of galaxies and quasars in the distant universe. The publicly available images from the survey were made between 1998 and 2009.

In July 2020, after a 20-year-long survey, astrophysicists of the Sloan Digital Sky Survey published the largest, most detailed 3D map of the universe so far, filled a gap of 11 billion years in its expansion history, and provided data which support the theory of a flat geometry of the universe and confirms that different regions seem to be expanding at different speeds.

== Observations ==
SDSS uses a dedicated 2.5 m wide-angle optical telescope; from 1998 to 2009 it observed in both imaging and spectroscopic modes. The imaging camera was retired in late 2009, since then the telescope has observed entirely in spectroscopic mode.

Images were taken using a photometric system of five filters (named u, g, r, i and z). These images are processed to produce lists of objects observed and various parameters, such as whether they seem pointlike or extended (as a galaxy might) and how the brightness on the CCDs relates to various kinds of astronomical magnitude.

For imaging observations, the SDSS telescope used the drift scanning technique, but with a choreographed variation of right ascension, declination, tracking rate, and image rotation which allows the telescope to track along great circles and continuously record small strips of the sky. The image of the stars in the focal plane drifts along the CCD chip, and the charge is electronically shifted along the detectors at the same rate, instead of staying fixed as in tracked telescopes. (Simply parking the telescope as the sky moves is only workable on the celestial equator, since stars at different declination move at different apparent speeds). This method allows consistent astrometry over the widest possible field and minimises overheads from reading out the detectors. The disadvantage is minor distortion effects.

The telescope's imaging camera is made up of 30 CCD chips, each with a resolution of 2048 × 2048 pixels, totaling approximately 120 megapixels. The chips are arranged in 5 rows of 6 chips. Each row has a different optical filter with average wavelengths of 355.1 (u), 468.6 (g), 616.5 (r), 748.1 (i), and 893.1 (z) nm, with 95% completeness in typical seeing to magnitudes of 22.0, 22.2, 22.2, 21.3, and 20.5, for u, g, r, i, z respectively. The filters are placed on the camera in the order r, i, u, z, g. To reduce noise, the camera is cooled to 190 kelvins (about −80 °C) by liquid nitrogen.

SDSS photometric system filters
	u	g	r	i	z
Mean wavelength (nm)	355.1	468.6	616.5	748.1	893.1
Magnitude limit	22.0	22.2	22.2	21.3	20.5

Note: colors are only approximate and based on wavelength to sRGB representation.

Using these photometric data, stars, galaxies, and quasars are also selected for spectroscopy. The spectrograph operates by feeding an individual optical fibre for each target through a hole drilled in an aluminum plate. Each hole is positioned specifically for a selected target, so every field in which spectra are to be acquired requires a unique plate. The original spectrograph attached to the telescope was capable of recording 640 spectra simultaneously, while the updated spectrograph for SDSS III can record 1000 spectra at once. Throughout each night, between six and nine plates are typically used for recording spectra. In spectroscopic mode, the telescope tracks the sky in the standard way, keeping the objects focused on their corresponding fiber tips.

Every night the telescope produces about 200 GB of data.

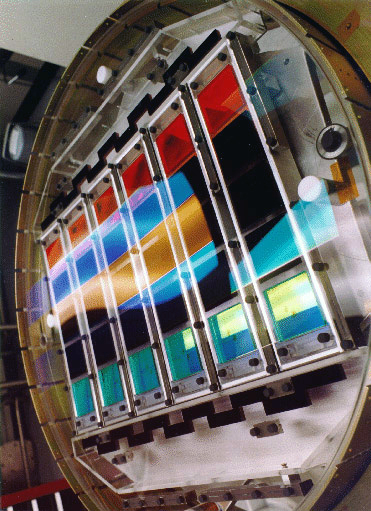
SDSS imaging camera

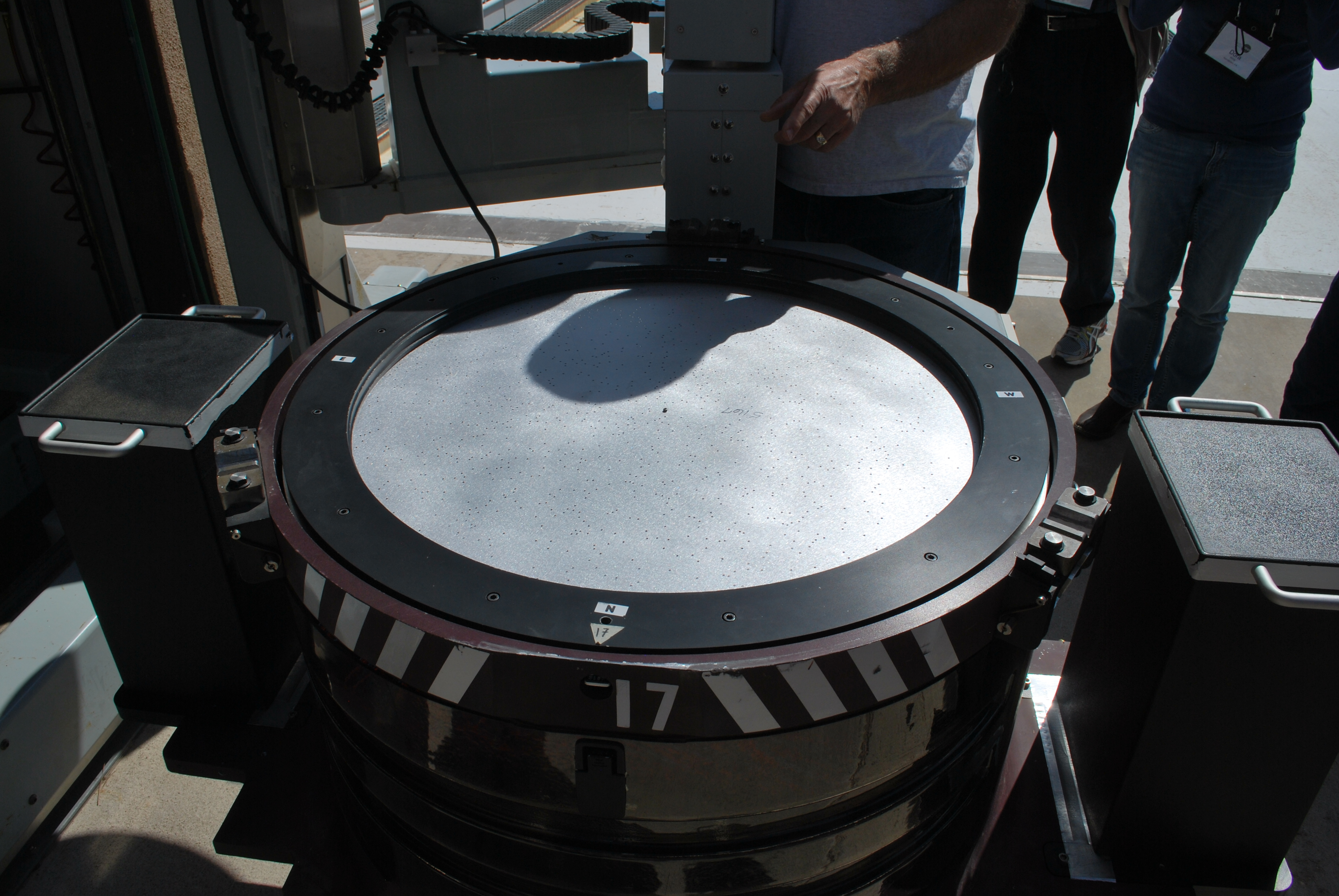
SDSS spectroscope cartridge

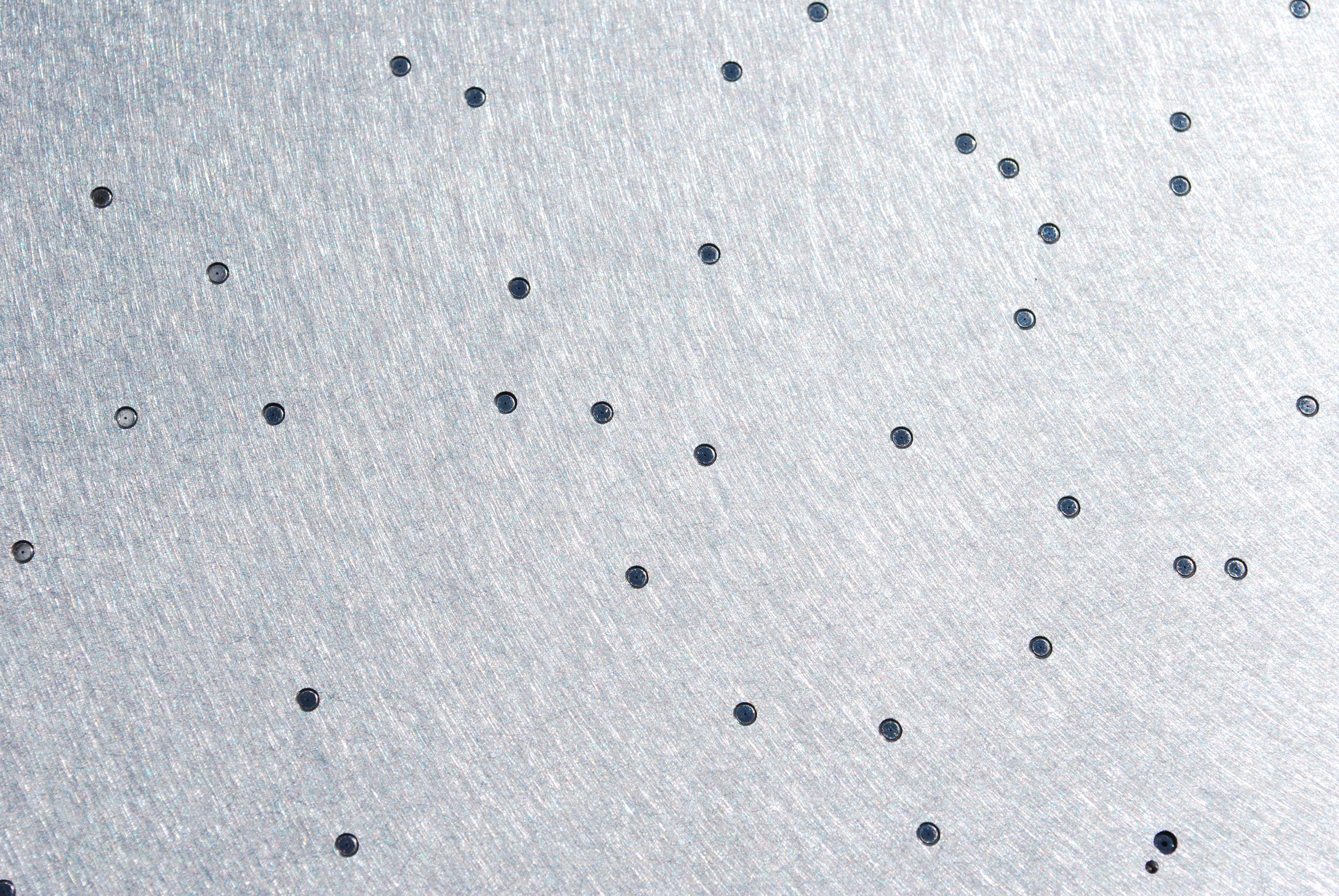
Aluminum plate close-up showing optical fibers

== Phases ==
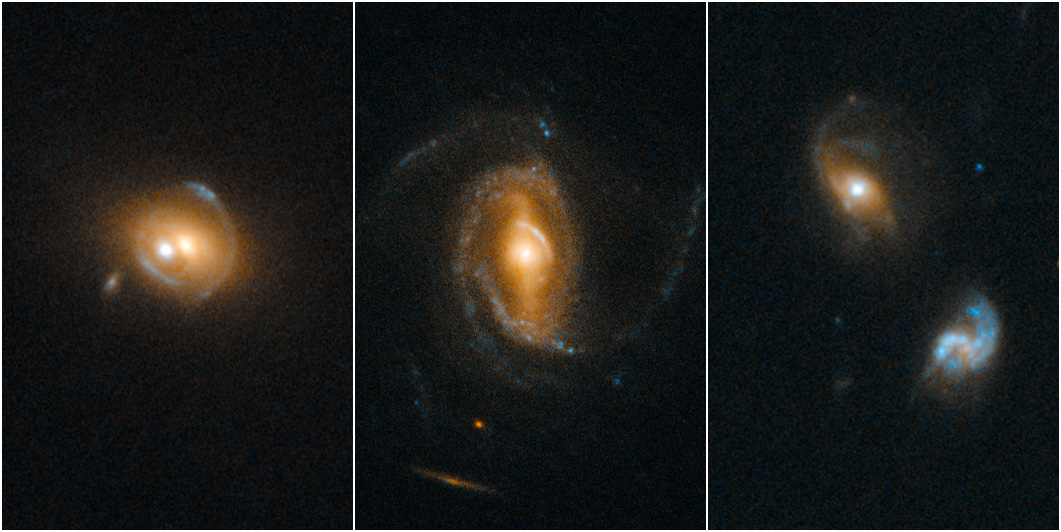
Quasars acting as gravitational lenses. To find these cases of galaxy–quasar combinations acting as lenses, astronomers selected 23,000 quasar spectra from the SDSS.

=== SDSS-I: 2000–2005 ===
During its first phase of operations, 2000–2005, the SDSS imaged more than 8,000 square degrees of the sky in five optical bandpasses, and it obtained spectra of galaxies and quasars selected from 5,700 square degrees of that imaging. It also obtained repeated imaging (roughly 30 scans) of a 300 square-degree stripe in the southern Galactic cap.

=== SDSS-II: 2005–2008 ===
In 2005 the survey entered a new phase, the SDSS-II, by extending the observations to explore the structure and stellar makeup of the Milky Way, the SEGUE and the Sloan Supernova Survey, which watches after supernova Ia events to measure the distances to far objects.

==== Sloan Legacy Survey ====
The Sloan Legacy Survey covers over 7,500 square degrees of the Northern Galactic Cap with data from nearly 2 million objects and spectra from over 800,000 galaxies and 100,000 quasars. The information on the position and distance of the objects has allowed the large-scale structure of the Universe, with its voids and filaments, to be investigated for the first time. Almost all of these data were obtained in SDSS-I, but a small part of the footprint was finished in SDSS-II.

==== Sloan Extension for Galactic Understanding and Exploration (SEGUE) ====
The Sloan Extension for Galactic Understanding and Exploration obtained spectra of 240,000 stars (with a typical radial velocity of 10 km/s) to create a detailed three-dimensional map of the Milky Way. SEGUE data provide evidence for the age, composition and phase space distribution of stars within the various Galactic components, providing crucial clues for understanding the structure, formation and evolution of our galaxy.

The stellar spectra, imaging data, and derived parameter catalogs for this survey are publicly available as part of SDSS Data Release 7 (DR7).

==== Sloan Supernova Survey ====
The SDSS Supernova Survey, which ran from 2005 to 2008, performed repeat imaging of one stripe of sky 2.5° wide centered on the celestial equator, going from 20 hours right ascension to 4 hours RA so that it was in the southern galactic cap and did not suffer from galactic extinction. The project discovered more than 500 type Ia supernovae, Running until the end of the year 2007, the Supernova Survey searched for Type Ia supernovae. The survey rapidly scanned a 300 square degree area to detect variable objects and supernovae. It detected 130 confirmed supernovae Ia events in 2005 and a further 197 in 2006. In 2014 an even larger catalogue was released containing 10,258 variable and transient sources. Of these, 4,607 sources are either confirmed or likely supernovae, which makes this the largest set of supernovae so far compiled.

=== SDSS III: 2008–2014 ===
In mid-2008, SDSS-III was started. It comprised four separate surveys:

==== APO Galactic Evolution Experiment (APOGEE) ====
The APO Galactic Evolution Experiment (APOGEE) used high-resolution, high signal-to-noise infrared spectroscopy to penetrate the dust that obscures the inner Galaxy. APOGEE surveyed 100,000 red giant stars across the full range of the galactic bulge, bar, disk, and halo. It increased the number of stars observed at high spectroscopic resolution (R ≈ 20,000 at λ ≈ 1.6 μm) and high signal-to-noise ratio (100∶1) by more than a factor of 100. The high-resolution spectra revealed the abundances of about 15 elements, giving information on the composition of the gas clouds the red giants formed from. APOGEE planned to collect data from 2011 to 2014, with the first data released as part of SDSS DR10 in late 2013.

==== Baryon Oscillation Spectroscopic Survey (BOSS) ====
The SDSS-III's Baryon Oscillation Spectroscopic Survey (BOSS) was designed to measure the expansion rate of the Universe. It mapped the spatial distribution of luminous red galaxies (LRGs) and quasars to determine their spatial distribution and detect the characteristic scale imprinted by baryon acoustic oscillations in the early universe. Sound waves that propagate in the early universe, like spreading ripples in a pond, imprint a characteristic scale on the positions of galaxies relative to each other. It was announced that BOSS had measured the scale of the universe to an accuracy of one percent, and was completed in Spring 2014.

==== Multi-object APO Radial Velocity Exoplanet Large-area Survey (MARVELS) ====
The Multi-object APO Radial Velocity Exoplanet Large-area Survey (MARVELS) monitored the radial velocities of 11,000 bright stars, with the precision and cadence needed to detect gas giant planets that have orbital periods ranging from several hours to two years. This ground-based Doppler survey used the SDSS telescope and new multi-object Doppler instruments to monitor radial velocities.

The main goal of the project was to generate a large-scale, statistically well-defined sample of giant planets. It searched for gaseous planets having orbital periods ranging from hours to 2 years and masses between 0.5 and 10 times that of Jupiter. A total of 11,000 stars were analyzed with 25–35 observations per star over 18 months. It was expected to detect between 150 and 200 new exoplanets, and was able to study rare systems, such as planets with extreme eccentricity, and objects in the "brown dwarf desert".

The collected data were used as a statistical sample for the theoretical comparison and discovery of rare systems. The project started in the fall of 2008, and continued until spring 2014.

==== SEGUE-2 ====
The original Sloan Extension for Galactic Understanding and Exploration (SEGUE-1) obtained spectra of nearly 240,000 stars of a range of spectral types. Building on this success, SEGUE-2 spectroscopically observed around 120,000 stars, focusing on the in situ stellar halo of the Milky Way, from distances of 10 to 60 kpc. SEGUE-2 doubled the sample size of SEGUE-1.

Combining SEGUE-1 and 2 revealed the complex kinematic and chemical substructure of the galactic halo and disks, providing essential clues to the assembly and enrichment history of the galaxy. In particular, the outer halo was expected to be dominated by late-time accretion events. SEGUE data can help constrain existing models for the formation of the stellar halo and inform the next generation of high-resolution simulations of galaxy formation. In addition, SEGUE-1 and SEGUE-2 may help uncover rare, chemically primitive stars that are fossils of the earliest generations of cosmic star formation.

=== SDSS IV: 2014–2020 ===
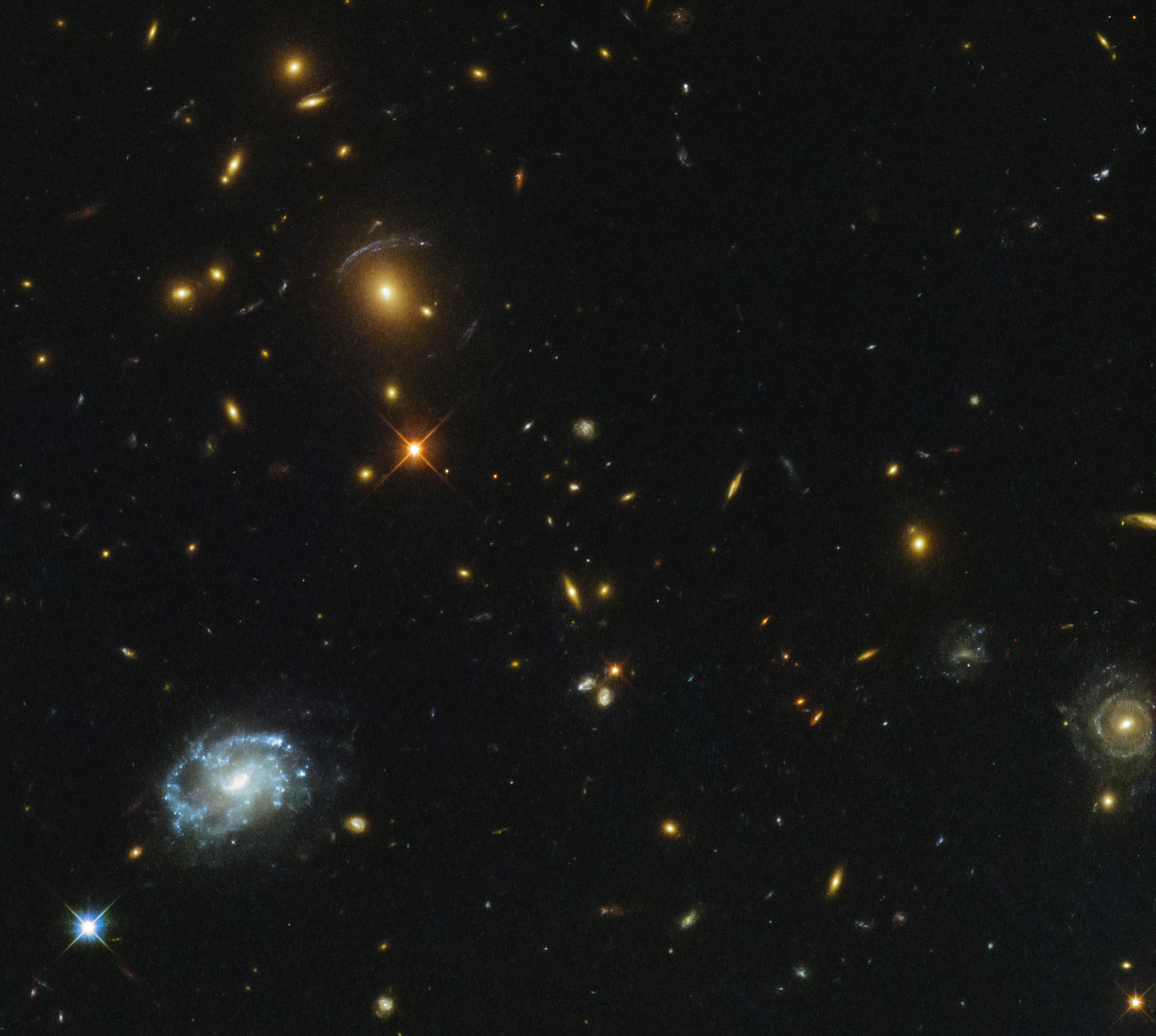
Light from distant galaxies has been smeared and twisted into odd shapes, arcs, and streaks.

The fourth generation of the SDSS (SDSS-IV, 2014–2020) is extending precision cosmological measurements to a critical early phase of cosmic history (eBOSS), expanding its infrared spectroscopic survey of the Galaxy in the northern and southern hemispheres (APOGEE-2), and for the first time using the Sloan spectrographs to make spatially resolved maps of individual galaxies (MaNGA).

==== APO Galactic Evolution Experiment (APOGEE-2) ====
A stellar survey of the Milky Way, with two major components: a northern survey using the bright time at APO, and a southern survey using the 2.5 m Du Pont Telescope at Las Campanas.

==== Extended Baryon Oscillation Spectroscopic Survey (eBOSS) ====
A cosmological survey of quasars and galaxies, also encompassing subprograms to survey variable objects (TDSS) and X-ray sources (SPIDERS).

==== Mapping Nearby Galaxies at APO (MaNGA) ====
A simplified graphical representation of a 7-fibre bundle. MaNGA measures 17 galaxies at a time, using bundles of 19, 37, 61, 91, and 127 fibers.

MaNGA (Mapping Nearby Galaxies at Apache Point Observatory), explored the detailed internal structure of nearly 10,000 nearby galaxies from 2014 to the spring of 2020. Earlier SDSS surveys only allowed spectra to be observed from the center of galaxies. By using two-dimensional arrays of optical fibers bundled together into a hexagonal shape, MaNGA was able to use spatially resolved spectroscopy to construct maps of the areas within galaxies, allowing deeper analysis of their structure, such as radial velocities and star formation regions.

=== SDSS-V: 2020–current ===
SDSS-V began science operations at Apache Point Observatory in New Mexico in October 2020, with Las Campanas Observatory in Chile joining shortly afterward. Both observatories use automated robotic fiber-positioning instead of the older manually drilled plug plates. The survey is scheduled to continue through 2027. The Milky Way Mapper survey is obtaining spectra of millions of stars to study the structure and evolution of the Milky Way. The Black Hole Mapper survey is targeting quasars and active galaxies to investigate the growth of supermassive black holes. The Local Volume Mapper is creating spectroscopic maps of the interstellar gas in the Milky Way and nearby galaxies.

== Data access ==
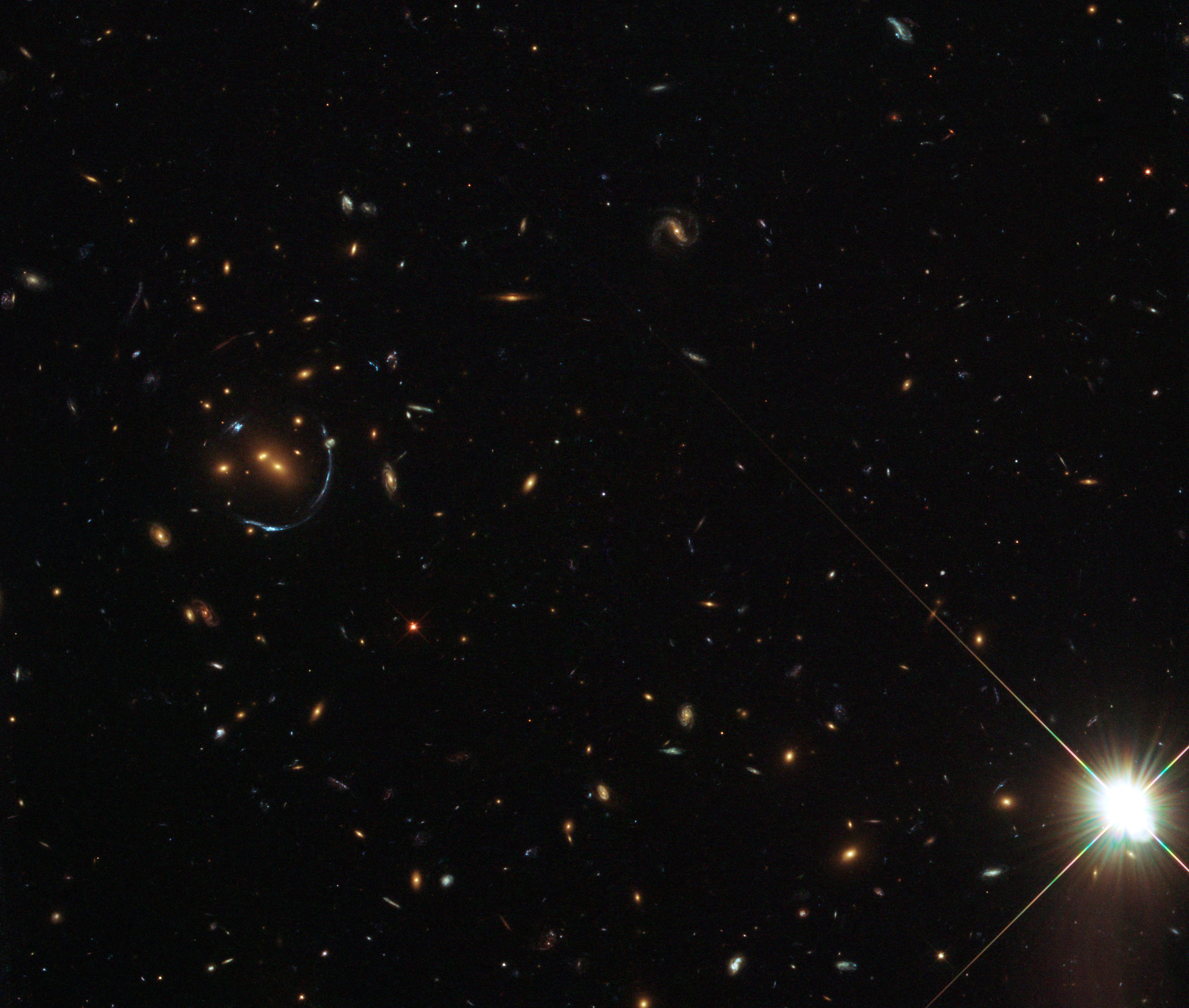
LRG-4-606 is a luminous red galaxy. LRG is the acronym given to a catalog of bright red galaxies found in the SDSS.

The survey makes the data releases available over the Internet. The SkyServer provides a range of interfaces to an underlying Microsoft SQL Server. Both spectra and images are available in this way, and interfaces are made very easy to use so that, for example, a full-color image of any region of the sky covered by an SDSS data release can be obtained just by providing the coordinates. The data are available for non-commercial use only, without written permission. The SkyServer also provides a range of tutorials aimed at everyone from schoolchildren up to professional astronomers. The tenth major data release, DR10, released in July 2013, provides images, imaging catalogs, spectra, and redshifts via a variety of search interfaces.

SDSS has released a number of value-added catalogs for the Stripe 82 region. Stripe 82 has also been observed by other telescopes at many other wavelengths.

The raw data (from before being processed into databases of objects) are also available through another Internet server and first experienced as a 'fly-through' via the NASA World Wind program.

Sky in Google Earth includes data from the SDSS, for those regions where such data are available. There are also KML plugins for SDSS photometry and spectroscopy layers, allowing direct access to SkyServer data from within Google Sky.

The data are also available on Hayden Planetarium with a 3D visualizer.

Following Technical Fellow Jim Gray's contribution on behalf of Microsoft Research with the SkyServer project, Microsoft's WorldWide Telescope makes use of SDSS and other data sources.

MilkyWay@home also used SDSS's data to create a highly accurate three-dimensional model of the Milky Way galaxy.

== Results ==
Along with publications describing the survey itself, SDSS data have been used in publications over a huge range of astronomical topics. The SDSS website has a full list of these publications covering distant quasars at the limits of the observable universe, the distribution of galaxies, the properties of stars in our galaxy and also subjects such as dark matter and dark energy in the universe.

=== Maps ===
Based on the release of Data Release 9 a new 3D map of massive galaxies and distant black holes was published on August 8, 2012.

== See also ==
- Alex Szalay
- Alfred P. Sloan Foundation
- Apache Point Observatory
- Dark Energy Spectroscopic Instrument
- Galaxy color-magnitude diagram
- Galaxy Zoo
- James E. Gunn
- Sloan Great Wall
