= List of members of the eighth Knesset =

The 120 members of the eighth Knesset were elected on 31 December 1973. The breakdown by party was as follows:

- Alignment: 51
- Likud: 39
- National Religious Party: 10
- Religious Torah Front: 5
- Independent Liberals: 4
- Rakah: 4
- Ratz: 3
- Progress and Development: 2
- Moked: 1
- Arab List for Bedouins and Villagers: 1

The eighth Knesset was sworn in on 21 January 1974.

== List of members ==
Member	Party	Notes
Yigal Allon	Alignment	
Yosef Almogi	Alignment	
Adiel Amorai	Alignment	
Ari Ankorion	Alignment	
Shoshana Arbeli-Almozlino	Alignment	
Moshe Baram	Alignment	
Yitzhak Ben-Aharon	Alignment	
Mordechai Ben-Porat	Alignment	Left party to sit as an independent
Moshe Carmel	Alignment	
David Coren	Alignment	
Moshe Dayan	Alignment	
Yehuda Dranitzki	Alignment	Briefly broke away with Mapam, but later returned to the Alignment
Abd el-Aziz el-Zoubi	Alignment	
Abba Eban	Alignment	
Aharon Efrat	Alignment	Briefly broke away with Mapam, but later returned to the Alignment
Aryeh Eliav	Alignment	Left party to sit as an independent, before establishing Ya'ad – Civil Rights Movement and then forming the Independent Socialist Faction
Uzi Feinerman	Alignment	
Yisrael Galili	Alignment	
Avraham Givelber	Alignment	
Haika Grossman	Alignment	Briefly broke away with Mapam, but later returned to the Alignment
Zvi Guershoni	Alignment	
Mathilda Guez	Alignment	
Menachem Hacohen	Alignment	
Ben-Zion Halfon	Alignment	
Michael Harish	Alignment	
Esther Herlitz	Alignment	
Shlomo Hillel	Alignment	
Yisrael Kargman	Alignment	
Nuzhat Katzav	Alignment	
Shalom Levin	Alignment	
Golda Meir	Alignment	
Eliyahu Moyal	Alignment	
Ora Namir	Alignment	
Yitzhak Navon	Alignment	
Avraham Ofer	Alignment	
Shimon Peres	Alignment	
Yitzhak Rabin	Alignment	
Eliezer Ronen	Alignment	Briefly broke away with Mapam, but later returned to the Alignment
Pinchas Sapir	Alignment	
Yossi Sarid	Alignment	
Moshe Shahal	Alignment	
Meir Talmi	Alignment	Briefly broke away with Mapam, but later returned to the Alignment
Moshe Wertman	Alignment	
Gad Yaacobi	Alignment	
Aharon Yadlin	Alignment	
Aviad Yafeh	Alignment	
Aharon Yariv	Alignment	
Yisrael Yeshayahu	Alignment	
Haim Yosef Zadok	Alignment	
Dov Zakin	Alignment	Briefly broke away with Mapam, but later returned to the Alignment
Avraham Zilberberg	Alignment	
Zalman Abramov	Likud	
Moshe Arens	Likud	
Yoram Aridor	Likud	
Yohanan Bader	Likud	
Yedidia Be'eri	Likud	
Menachem Begin	Likud	
Meir Cohen-Avidov	Likud	
Geula Cohen	Likud	
Haim Corfu	Likud	
Matityahu Drobles	Likud	
Leon Dycian	Likud	
Simha Erlich	Likud	
Yehezkel Flomin	Likud	
Pesah Grupper	Likud	
Binyamin Halevi	Likud	Left party to sit as an independent
Yigal Hurvitz	Likud	
Avraham Katz	Likud	
Ben-Zion Keshet	Likud	
Yosef Kremerman	Likud	
Haim Landau	Likud	
David Levy	Likud	
Amnon Linn	Likud	
Eitan Livni	Likud	
Yitzhak Moda'i	Likud	
Moshe Nissim	Likud	
Akiva Nof	Likud	Left party to establish the Free Centre
Ehud Olmert	Likud	
Gideon Patt	Likud	
Yitzhak Peretz	Likud	
Elimelekh Rimalt	Likud	
Yitzhak Shamir	Likud	
Ariel Sharon	Likud	
Avraham Shekhterman	Likud	
Eliezer Shostak	Likud	
Zalman Shoval	Likud	
Shmuel Tamir	Likud	Left party to establish the Free Centre
Yosef Tamir	Likud	
Menachem Yedid	Likud	
Avraham Yoffe	Likud	
Aharon Abuhatzira	National Religious Party	
Eliezer Avtabi	National Religious Party	
Yehuda Ben-Meir	National Religious Party	
Yosef Burg	National Religious Party	
Michael Hasani	National Religious Party	
Zevulun Hammer	National Religious Party	
Avraham Melamed	National Religious Party	
Yitzhak Rafael	National Religious Party	
Pinhas Scheinman	National Religious Party	
Zerach Warhaftig	National Religious Party	
Yehuda Meir Abramowicz	Religious Torah Front	When party split, represented Agudat Yisrael
Kalman Kahana	Religious Torah Front	When party split, represented Poalei Agudat Yisrael
Shlomo Lorincz	Religious Torah Front	When party split, represented Agudat Yisrael
Menachem Porush	Religious Torah Front	
Avraham Verdiger	Religious Torah Front	When party split, represented Poalei Agudat Yisrael
Gideon Hausner	Independent Liberals	
Moshe Kol	Independent Liberals	
Hillel Seidel	Independent Liberals	Left party and joined Likud
Yehuda Sha'ari	Independent Liberals	
Avraham Levenbraun	Rakah	Party merged into Hadash
Tawfik Toubi	Rakah	Party merged into Hadash
Meir Vilner	Rakah	Party merged into Hadash
Tawfiq Ziad	Rakah	Party merged into Hadash
Shulamit Aloni	Ratz	Party briefly merged into Ya'ad – Civil Rights Movement before becoming independent again
Marcia Freedman	Ratz	Party merged into Ya'ad – Civil Rights Movement. When it split, Freedman joined the Independent Socialist Faction.
Boaz Moav	Ratz	Party briefly merged into Ya'ad – Civil Rights Movement before becoming independent again
Seif el-Din el-Zoubi	Progress and Development	Party merged into the Alignment, before leaving and later establishing the United Arab List
Jabr Muadi	Progress and Development	Party merged into the Alignment, before leaving and later establishing the United Arab List
Meir Pa'il	Moked	
Hamad Abu Rabia	Arab List for Bedouins and Villagers	Party merged into the Alignment, before leaving and later merging into the United Arab List

=== Replacements ===
MK	Replaced	Date	Party	Notes
Haviv Shimoni	Abd el-Aziz el-Zoubi	14 February 1974	Alignment	
Nissim Eliad	Moshe Kol	10 March 1974	Independent Liberals	
Yitzhak Golan	Gideon Hausner	10 March 1974	Independent Liberals	
Amos Hadar	Uzi Feinerman	8 April 1974	Alignment	
Jacques Amir	Golda Meir	10 June 1974	Alignment	
Yigal Cohen	Ariel Sharon	23 December 1974	Likud	
Simcha Friedman	Michael Hasani	2 July 1975	National Religious Party	
Ya'akov Frank	Pinchas Sapir	12 August 1975	Alignment	
Shlomo-Ya'akov Gross	Menachem Porush	23 November 1975	Religious Torah Front	When party split, represented Agudat Yisrael
Senetta Yoseftal	Zvi Guershoni	1 September 1976	Alignment	
Yehiel Leket	Avraham Ofer	3 January 1977	Alignment	
Haim Kaufman	Binyamin Halevi	19 January 1977	Likud	
Zita Linker	Shmuel Tamir	21 January 1977	Likud	
Amal Nasser el-Din	Akiva Nof	22 January 1977	Likud	
Zvi Alderoti	Aharon Yariv	16 May 1977	Alignment	
