= Zvi Alderoti =

Israeli politician (1934–2018)

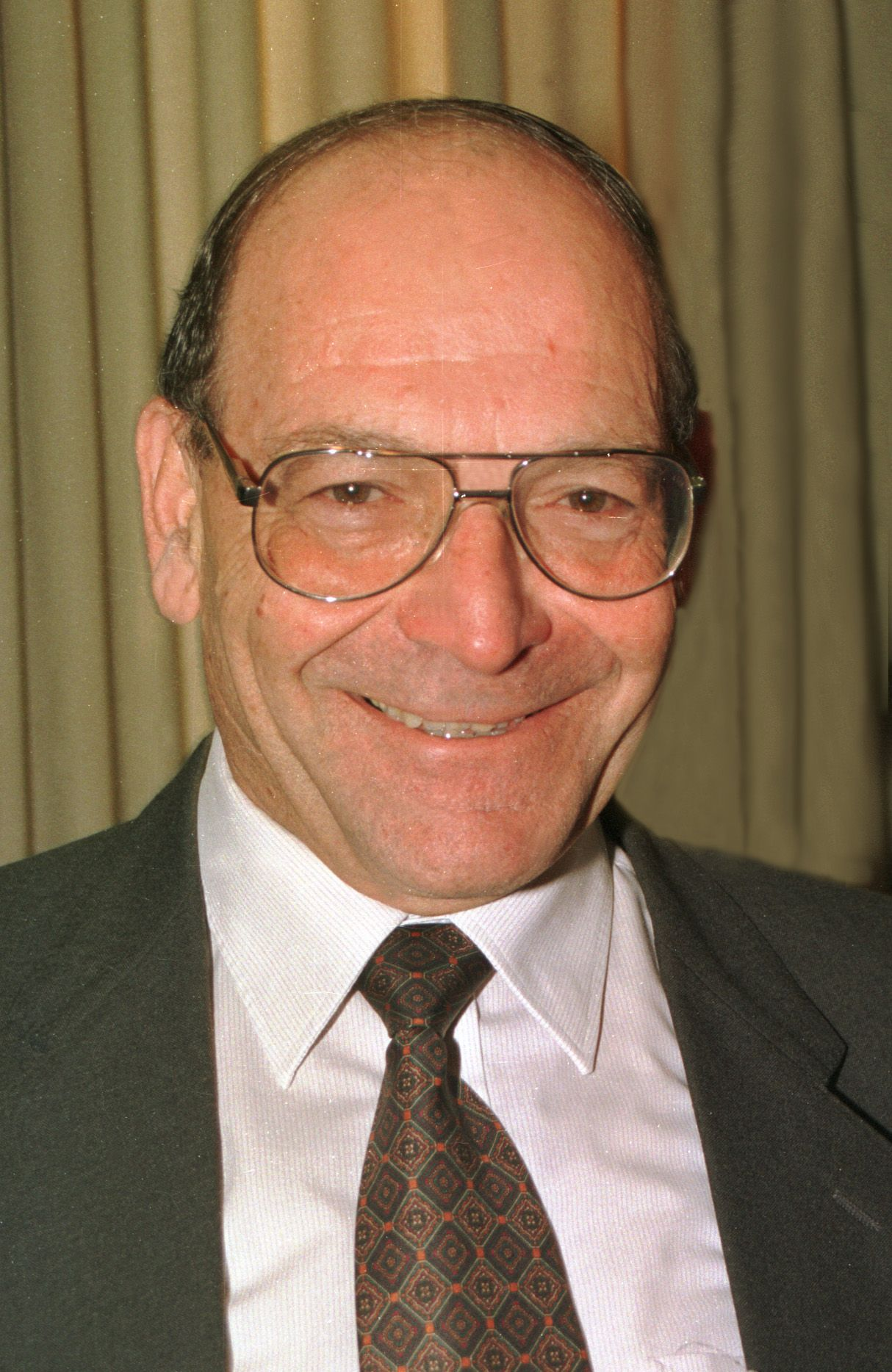
- Alderoti in 1994

Faction represented in the Knesset
- 1977: Alignment

Personal details
- Born: 9 May 1934 Tel Aviv, Mandatory Palestine
- Died: 13 April 2018 (aged 83)

Zvi Alderoti (Hebrew: צבי אלדרוטי; 9 May 1934 – 13 April 2018) was an Israeli politician who briefly served as a member of the Knesset for the Alignment in 1977.

== Biography ==
Born in Tel Aviv during the Mandate era, Alderoti was educated at Ayanot agricultural high school. He joined the Meuhedet movement and was a cadet between 1947 and 1949. He studied at the University of Haifa, from which he received a BA in political science and public administration. He later worked for Amidar, serving as director general and chairman of the board of directors between 1972 and 1975. Between 1975 and 1977 he helped establish new neighbourhoods in the north of Israel for the Elram housing company.

Alderoti joined Mapai in 1949. In 1959 he became head of Migdal HaEmek local council, a post he held until 1977. He became a member of the Mapai central committee in 1965, and in 1971 he established the Northern Branch of the Labor Party (which Mapai had merged into in 1968), and chaired it between 1971 and 1977. He was on the Alignment list (an alliance of the Labor Party and Mapam) for the 1973 Knesset elections, but failed to win a seat. Although he entered the Knesset on 16 May 1977 as a replacement for Aharon Yariv, he lost his seat in the 17 May elections, holding it only until the new Knesset was sworn in on 13 June.

After leaving the Knesset Alderoti worked as director for the Development and Independence Loan Project in Argentina until 1979, before becoming a director of Housing for the Immigrant, a post he held until 1985. He also served as a director of HRC Investments, chairman of the board at Davar between 1988 and 1990, chairman of Shekem from 1990 until 1994, and director of the Prime Minister's Office from 1995 until 1996.
