= Eliezer Ronen =

Israeli politician (1931–2016)

- אליעזר רונן
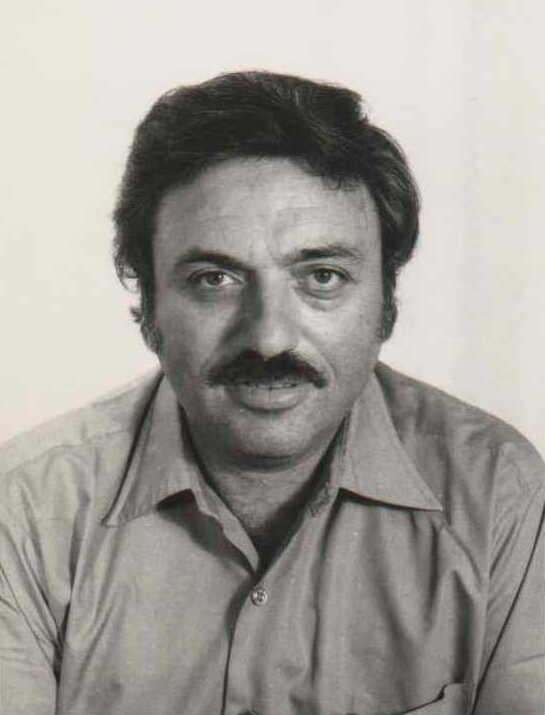
- Ronen in the mid-1970s

Faction represented in the Knesset
- 1974–1977: Alignment
- 1977: Mapam

Personal details
- Born: 24 September 1931; Mexico City, Mexico
- Died: 17 March 2016 (aged 84); Israel

Eliezer Ronen (Hebrew: אליעזר רונן; 24 September 1931 – 17 March 2016) was an Israeli politician who served as a member of the Knesset for the Alignment and Mapam between 1974 and 1977.

== Biography ==
Born Eliezer Rosenfeld in Mexico City, Ronen attended a local Jewish school and the French Marlos school, where he studied economics. He joined the Mexican branch of Hashomer Hatzair, becoming its co-ordinator. He was also a member of the board of the country's Federation of Zionist Youth, the Community Council and the Zionist Federation of Mexico.

In 1952 he emigrated to Israel and worked in the Research Department at the Bank of Israel until 1962. He later worked for the Tahal water company, and served as director of the Economic Planning Authority between 1970 and 1972.

A member of Mapam, in 1965 he became a member of the party's central committee. The following year he was voted onto Jerusalem City Council, which he served on until 1972. In 1968 he became a member of the Mapam secretariat. From 1972 until 1981 he chaired the board of directors at Carta, the Company for the Development of Central Jerusalem.

In 1973 Ronen was elected to the Knesset on the Alignment list, an alliance of Mapam and the Labor Party. On 10 April 1977 Mapam broke away from the Alignment, but rejoined two days later. He lost his seat in the 1977 elections. In 1993 he became the party's chairman.

Ronen studied political science and business administration at the Hebrew University of Jerusalem, gaining an MA and a law degree. He died on 17 March 2016 at the age of 84.
