= Women's Party (Israel) =

Women's Party מפלגת הנשים
- Founded: 1977
- Split from: Independent Socialist Faction
- Ideology: Feminism

The Women's Party (Hebrew: מפלגת הנשים, romanized: Mifleget HaNashim) was a minor political party in Israel.

== Background ==
The party was established prior to the 1977 elections, with the founders including Israeli-American Marcia Freedman. Freedman had been an MK for Ratz in the eighth Knesset, but had broken away with Aryeh Eliav to form the Independent Socialist Faction. Whilst the ISP chose to merge with several other small left-wing parties (Meri, Moked and some Black Panthers) to form the Left Camp of Israel, Freedman decided to set up a new feminist party to fight the election.

However, the new party won only 5,674 votes and failed to cross the electoral threshold of 1%, subsequently disappearing. Freedman turned her attentions to charity, helping to found the women's centre Kol HaIsha (Voice of the Woman) in 1979, and returned to the United States in 1981.

In the 1992 Knesset elections the Women's Party received 2,886 votes (0.1%).
