= Ya'akov Frank =

Israeli politician (1913–1993)

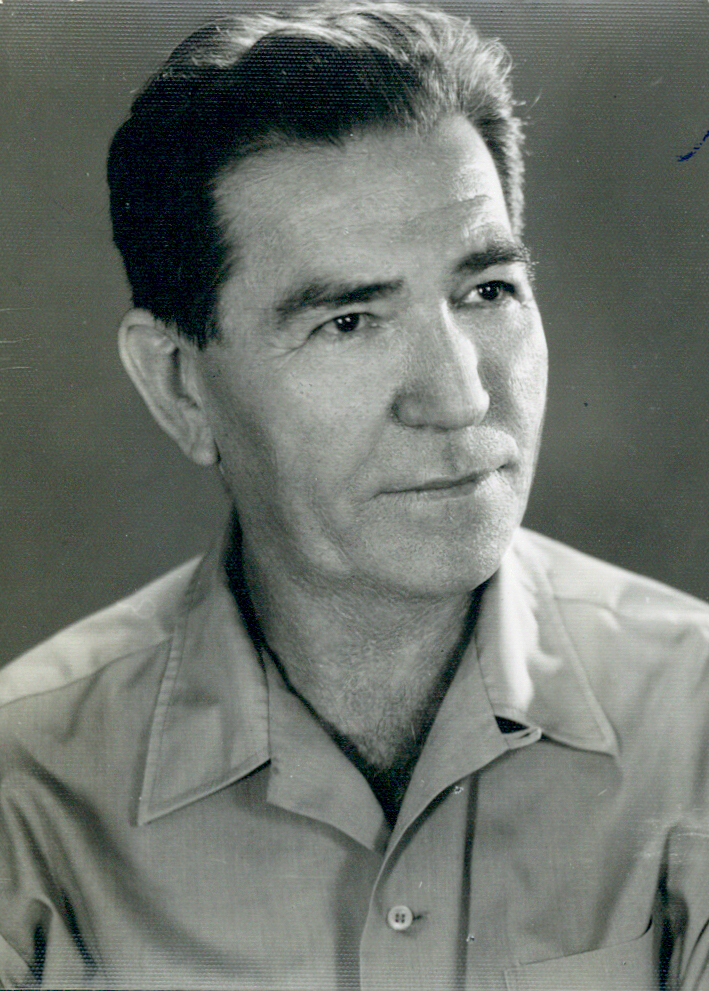
- Frank during the 1970s

Faction represented in the Knesset
- 1975–1977: Alignment

Personal details
- Born: 12 March 1913 Jerusalem, Ottoman Empire
- Died: 10 July 1993 (aged 80)

Ya'akov Frank (Hebrew: יעקב פרנק; 12 March 1913 – 10 July 1993) was an Israeli politician who served as a member of the Knesset for the Alignment between 1975 and 1977.

== Biography ==
Frank was born in Jerusalem during the Ottoman era. His father was Rabbi Tzvi Pesach Frank. Frank received a high school education. He later served as chairman of the Association of Craftsmen.

Frank joined the Haganah and was one of its commanders in Jerusalem in the 1930s. He joined the Notrim in 1938. Fearing arrest by the British over his association with the Haganah, he moved to the United States and lived in New York City, where he worked odd jobs. During World War II he joined the United States Army, became an officer, and saw action in the Pacific theater. In October 1944 he was wounded in the Philippines. He was awarded the Purple Heart. After the war he participated in Aliyah Bet activities and was a crewman on the Aliyah Bet ship Biriya in 1946.

Frank served in the Israel Defense Forces during the 1948 Arab-Israeli War. After the war he established a workshop for spring manufacturing. In 1951 he was recruited by the Mossad for undercover work in Iraq but felt that his cover was faulty and left after a week. He returned to managing his workshop with his brother. The workshop was given an award for its contribution to the war effort following the Six-Day War.

He was on the Alignment list for the 1973 Knesset elections, but failed to win a seat. However, he entered the Knesset on 12 August 1975 as a replacement for the deceased Pinchas Sapir. He sat on the Economic Affairs Committee and the State Control Committee, before losing his seat in the 1977 elections.

He died in 1993 at the age of 80.
