= Nuzhat Katzav =

Israeli politician (1932–2022)

- נוזהת קצב
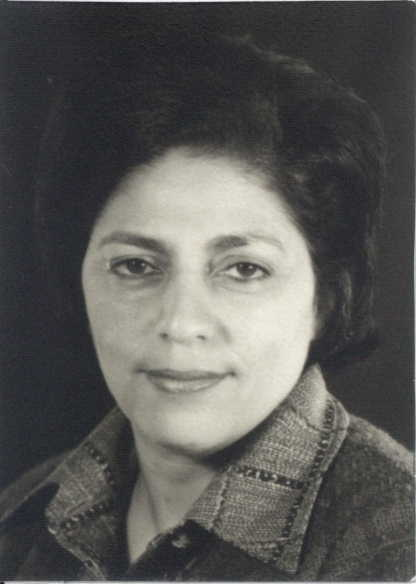
- Katzav in the mid-1970s

Faction represented in the Knesset
- 1974–1977: Alignment

Personal details
- Born: 1 April 1932; Baghdad, Iraq
- Died: 21 November 2022 (aged 90); Israel

Nuzhat Katzav (Hebrew: נוזהת קצב; Arabic: نزهة كتساف; 1 April 1932 – 21 November 2022) was an Israeli politician who served as a member of the Knesset for the Alignment between 1974 and 1977.

== Biography ==
Born in Baghdad in Iraq, Katzav attended an Arab girls school. She emigrated to Israel in 1951 and studied political science and Middle Eastern studies at the Hebrew University of Jerusalem. She joined the Na'amat women's organisation, and was a member of its secretariat between 1954 and 1970. In 1955 she joined Mapai.

In 1970 she became director of the Consumer Defence Authority and also of the Department of Arab and Druze Women. In 1973 she was elected to the Knesset on the Alignment list. She sat on the Finance Committee and the Economic Affairs Committee until losing her seat in the 1977 elections.

The following year she became a member of the Histadrut trade union's Organisation Committee, and also chaired the Association for Research and Culture of Iraqi Immigrants.

Katzav wrote several books, including The Social, Economic and Political Integration of Iraqi Immigrants (1953), Girls at Risk (1972), Quality of Life and Social Planning in the Consumer Age (1977) and The Extent Women Participate in Politics in Israel (1980).

Katzav died on 21 November 2022 at the age of 90.
