= Uzi Feinerman =

Israeli politician (1924–1975)

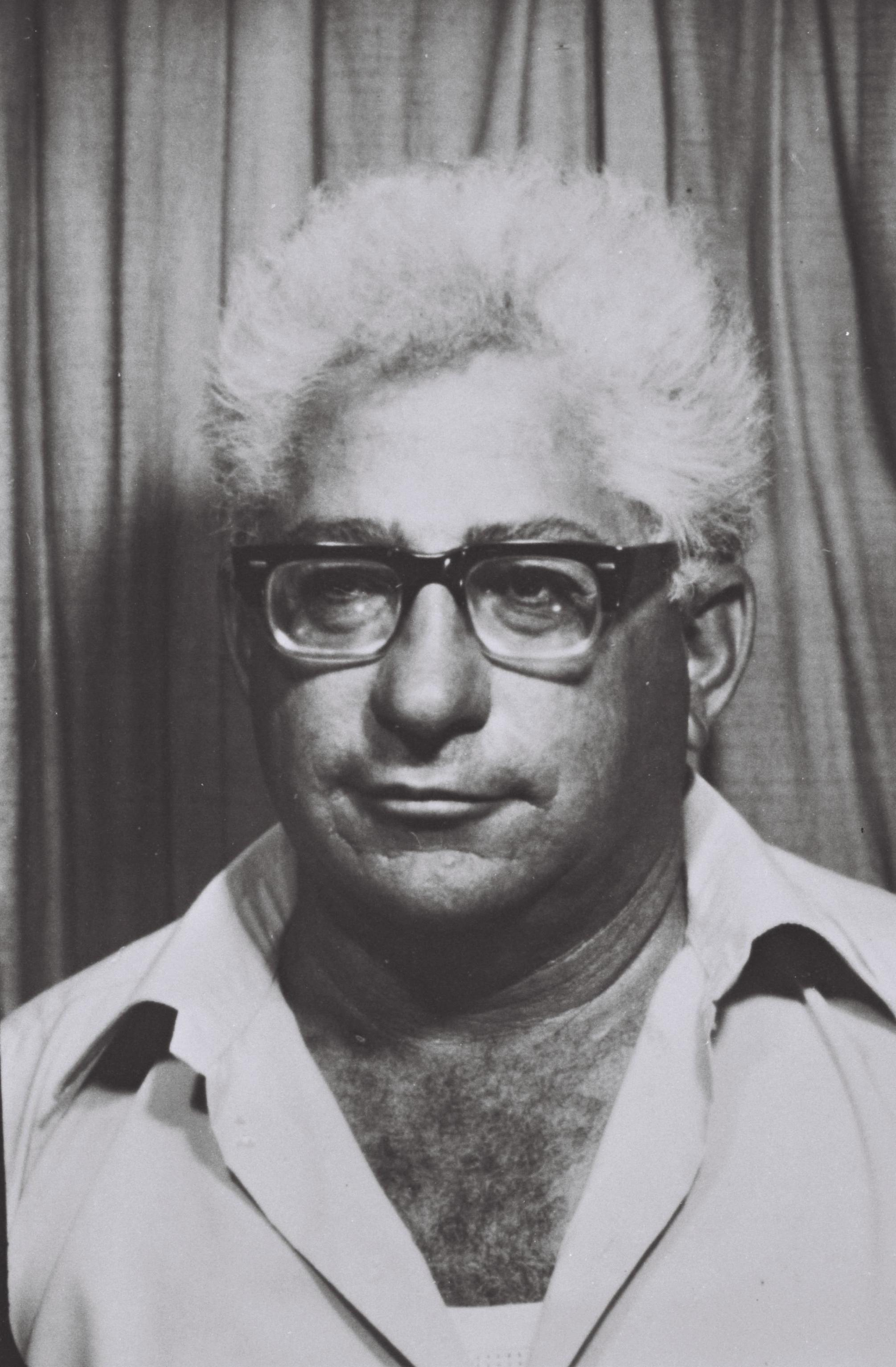
- Feinerman in 1969

Faction represented in the Knesset
- 1969–1975: Alignment

Personal details
- Born: 1924 Kfar Yehezkel, Mandatory Palestine
- Died: 8 April 1975 (aged 50–51)

Uzi Feinerman (Hebrew: עוזי פיינרמן; 1924 – 8 April 1975) was an Israeli politician who served as a member of the Knesset for the Alignment between 1969 and 1975.

== Biography ==
Born in Kfar Yehezkel during the Mandate era, Feinerman joined the Haganah in his youth. During the 1948 Arab-Israeli War he served in the Israel Defense Forces as a platoon commander in the Golani Brigade. He later attained the rank of Lieutenant Colonel in his reserve service.

In 1955 he began training new immigrants in moshavim, and between 1958 and 1969 served as the secretary of the Moshavim Movement. In 1969 he was elected to the Knesset on the Alignment list. After becoming an MK he established and headed the Knesset's Agricultural Forum. He retained his seat in the 1973 elections, but died in April 1975 while in office. His seat was taken by Amos Hadar.
