= Ya'ad – Civil Rights Movement =

Ya'ad – Civil Rights Movement יעד-תנועה לזכויות האזרח
- Leader: Shulamit Aloni; Aryeh Eliav
- Founded: June 1975
- Merger of: Ratz; Splinter from Alignment
- Succeeded by: Ratz; Independent Socialist Faction
- Ideology: Progressivism; Secularism; Two-state solution
- Political position: Left-wing
- Most MKs: 4 (1973)

Ya'ad – Civil Rights Movement (Hebrew: יעד – תנועה לזכויות האזרח, Ya'ad – Tenoa'a LaZkhuyot HaEzrah), commonly known as just Ya'ad, was a short-lived political party in Israel. It is not related to the other party by the name of Ya'ad, which existed during the ninth Knesset.

== Background ==
The party was formed on 3 June 1975 during the eighth Knesset when the three MKs that made up Ratz (the full name of which was the Civil Rights Movement) joined with independent MK Aryeh Eliav to form a new party. Eliav had been elected to the Knesset on the Alignment's list, but had broken away to sit as an independent.

However, the party was dissolved on 27 January 1976 as Eliav and Marcia Freedman broke away to form the Social-Democratic Faction, which they soon renamed the Independent Socialist Faction. The two remaining MKs, Shulamit Aloni and Boaz Moav, returned to Ratz.

The Independent Socialist Faction also failed to make it to the next election, as it merged with Meri, Moked and some members of the Black Panthers to form the Left Camp of Israel. Freedman did not join the new party, but founded the Women's Party, which failed to cross the Electoral threshold. Ratz eventually merged into Meretz.

== Knesset members ==
| Knesset (MKs) | Knesset Members |
|---|---|
| 8th (4) | Shulamit Aloni, Aryeh Eliav, Marcia Freedman, Boaz Moav |
