= Shulamit Aloni =

Israeli politician (1927–2014)

- שולמית אלוני
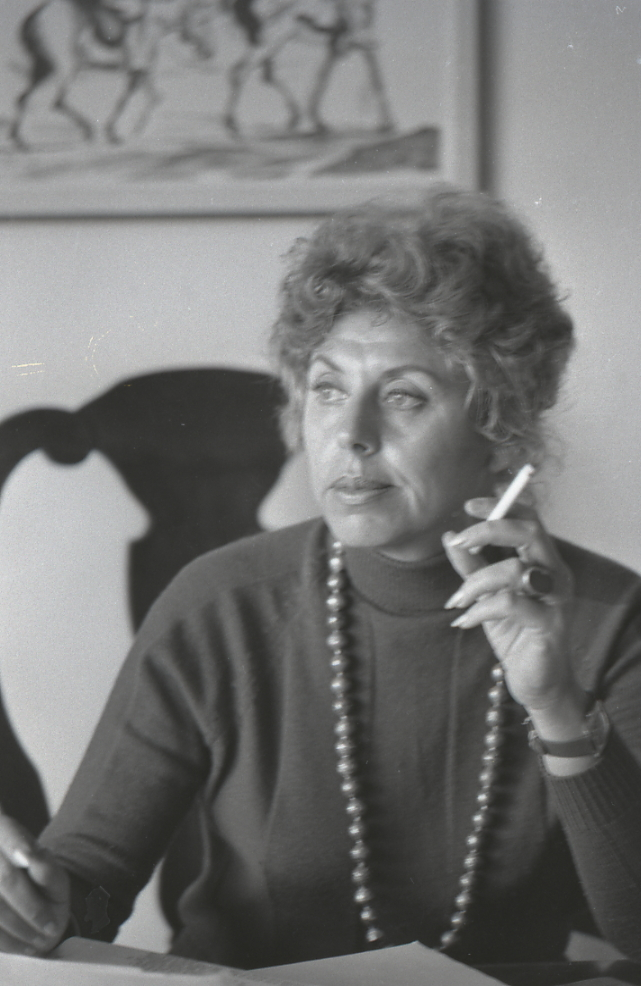
- Shulamit Aloni in 1970

Ministerial roles
- 1974: Minister without Portfolio
- 1992–1993: Minister of Education and Culture
- 1993: Minister without Portfolio
- 1993–1996: Minister of Communications
- 1993–1996: Minister of Science and the Arts

Other roles
- 1988–1990: Leader of the Opposition (de facto)

Faction represented in the Knesset
- 1965–1967: Labor Alignment
- 1967–1968: Labor Party
- 1968–1969: Alignment
- 1974–1975: Ratz
- 1975–1976: Ya'ad – Civil Rights Movement
- 1976–1981: Ratz
- 1981–1984: Alignment
- 1984–1992: Ratz
- 1992–1996: Meretz

Personal details
- Born: 27 December 1927 Włocławek, Poland
- Died: 24 January 2014 (aged 86) Kfar Shmaryahu, Israel

Shulamit Aloni (Hebrew: שולמית אלוני; 27 December 1927 – 24 January 2014, née Adler) was an Israeli politician. She founded the progressive Ratz party, was leader of the Meretz party, Leader of the Opposition from 1988 to 1990, and served as Minister of Education from 1992 to 1993. In 2000 she won the Israel Prize. Throughout her decades-long political career, Aloni advocated for secularism, women's rights, a peaceful solution to the Israeli–Palestinian conflict, equal treatment of Arab citizens of Israel and Palestinians and introduced the law that decriminalised homosexuality.

== Biography ==
=== Early life ===
Shulamit Adler was born in Poland. Her mother was a seamstress and her father was a carpenter, both descended from Polish rabbinical families. The family migrated to Mandatory Palestine when she was a child, and Aloni grew up in Tel Aviv. She was sent to boarding school during World War II while her parents served in the British Army. During the war, her younger brother Mordechai took his own life.

As a youth, Aloni was a member of the socialist Zionist Hashomer Hatzair youth movement and the Palmach. During the 1948 Arab–Israeli War, she was involved in military struggles for the Old City of Jerusalem and was captured by Jordanian forces. Following the establishment of the state of Israel, she worked with child refugees and helped establish a school for immigrant children. She taught in a school while studying law. After her marriage in 1952 to Reuven Aloni, the founder of Israel Lands Administration, she moved to Kfar Shmaryahu. Aloni joined Mapai in 1959. She also worked as an attorney, hosted a radio show called After Working Hours giving legal advice to ordinary Israelis and wrote columns for the newspaper Yediot Ahronoth and the weekly LaIsha.

=== Political career ===
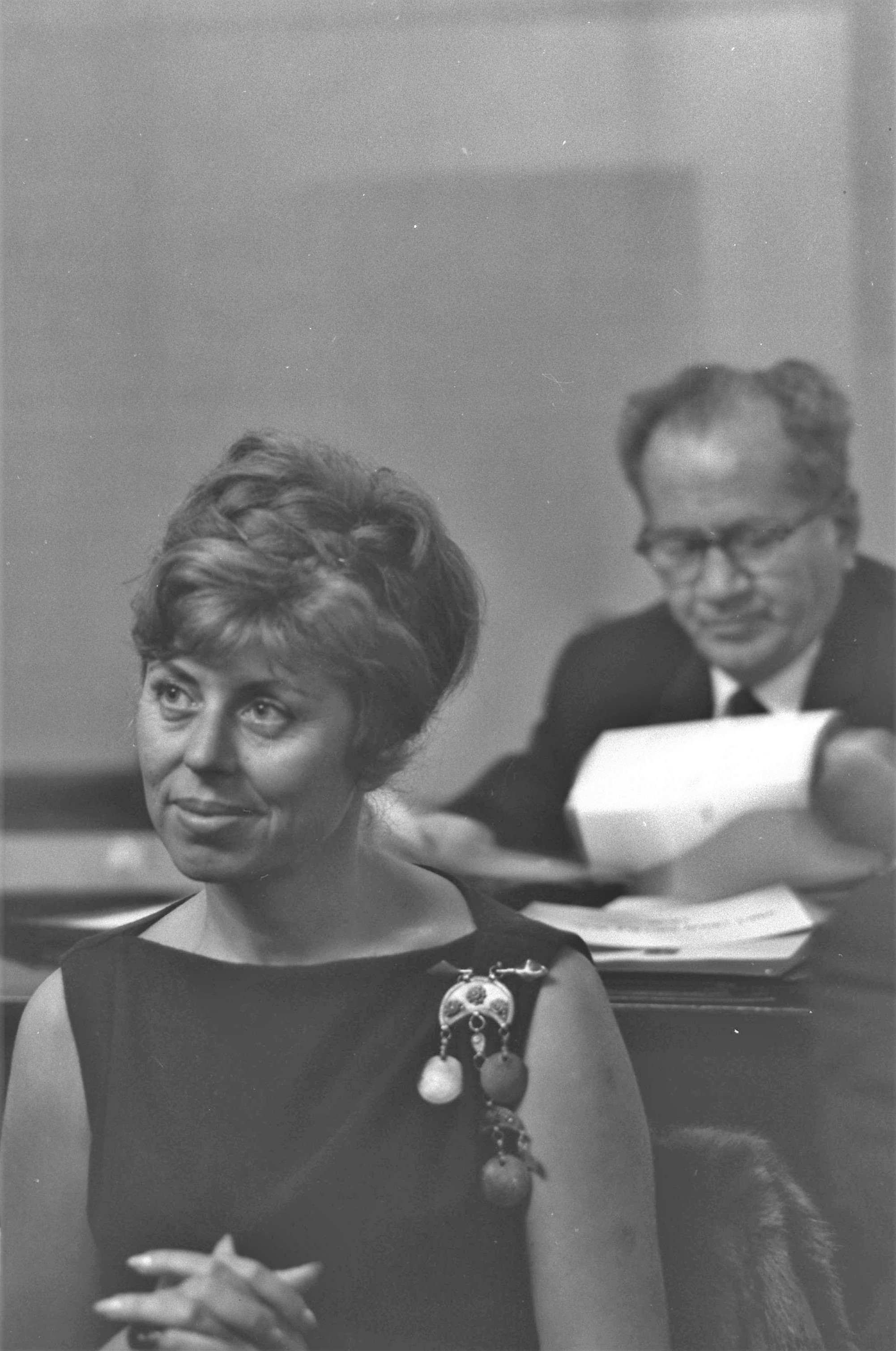
Aloni in the Knesset in 1965

In 1965, Aloni was elected to the Knesset on the list of the Alignment, an alliance of Mapai and Ahdut HaAvoda, and subsequently founded the Israel Consumers Council, which she chaired for four years. Before the 1969 elections, however, the Alignment refused to put her on the candidate list and she lost her seat. She attributed this to her bitter rivalry with Alignment leader, Prime Minister Golda Meir. When the party refused to stand her again in 1973, Aloni left the party altogether and tried to establish her own party. As she lacked the necessary signatures to stand for election, she worked with the feminist activist Marcia Freedman to establish the Movement for Civil Rights, which became known as Ratz.

The party advocated electoral reform, separation of religion and state and human rights and won three seats in the 1973 Knesset elections, making Aloni the most successful woman to lead a political party in Israel. Ratz initially joined the Alignment-led government with Aloni as Minister without Portfolio but she resigned immediately in protest at the appointment of Yitzhak Rafael as Minister of Religions. Ratz briefly became Ya'ad – Civil Rights Movement when independent MK Aryeh Eliav joined the party, but returned to its original status soon after, when Eliav and Freedman left over disputes on relations with the Palestine Liberation Organization, and the potential association of Ya'ad with the Moked party, the descendant of the communist Maki party.

Throughout the 1970s, Aloni attempted to initiate an ongoing dialogue with Palestinians in hopes of achieving a lasting peace settlement. During the 1982 Lebanon War she established the International Center for Peace in the Middle East. In the run-up to the 1984 elections, Ratz absorbed the ailing Left Camp of Israel (a party that had until recently contained Eliav, Moked, and the Israeli Council for Israeli-Palestinian Peace) and aligned with Peace Now to increase its size in the Knesset to three seats. In March 1988, Aloni sponsored a set of laws which successfully decriminalised homosexuality in Israel.

For the 1988 elections, Aloni voiced her support for a two-state solution. In 1992, she led Ratz into an alliance with Shinui and Mapam to form the new Meretz party, which won 12 seats under her leadership in the elections that year. Aloni became Minister of Education under Yitzhak Rabin but was forced to resign after a year due to her outspoken statements on matters of religion. As Education Minister, she also criticized organized tours by Israeli high school pupils to Holocaust concentration camps on grounds that such visits were turning Israeli youth into aggressive, nationalistic xenophobes, claiming that students "march with unfurled flags, as if they've come to conquer Poland". She was reappointed Minister of Communications and Science and Culture.

After the signing of the Oslo Accords in 1993, Aloni expressed her sentiments that the agreements were a positive turning point on an historic scale: "I feel like on the 29th of November [the date of the United Nations Partition Plan for Palestine]; we did not know then what we were heading for, but we knew we were heading for great days." After the massacre of 29 Muslims in Hebron, West Bank on February 25, 1994, perpetrated by Baruch Goldstein, Aloni called for the expulsion of Jewish settlers from Hebron. After the 1996 Knesset election, in which Meretz lost three of its seats, Aloni was ousted from Meretz leadership, with Yossi Sarid being elected to succeed her as leader of Meretz. She then retired from politics.

=== Last years ===
In a 2002 interview on Democracy Now!, American journalist Amy Goodman asked Aloni, "Often when there is dissent expressed in the United States against policies of the Israeli government, people here are called anti-Semitic. What is your response to that?" Aloni responded, opining that, "It is a trick we use. When from Europe somebody is criticizing Israel, then we bring up the Holocaust. When in this country [the USA] people are criticizing Israel, then they are anti-Semitic." [...] "And their attitude is: Israel, my country, right or wrong, the identification. And they are not ready to hear criticism."

Aloni was a board member of Yesh Din, an organisation founded in 2005 which focuses on human rights in the occupied Palestinian territories. She defended U.S. President Jimmy Carter's use of the word "apartheid" in the title of his book, Palestine: Peace Not Apartheid. Later, Aloni said, "I hate to cover up things that should be open to the sun."

== Personal life ==
With her husband, Reuven Aloni, she had three sons:

- Dror Aloni – later mayor of Kfar Shmaryahu and head of Herzliya Hebrew Gymnasium
- Nimrod Aloni – an education philosopher
- Udi Aloni – a film director, writer and artist

Reuven Aloni died in 1988.

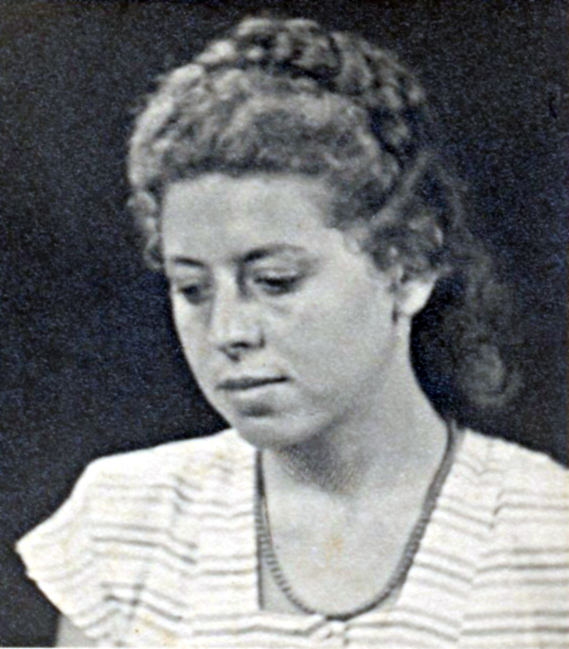
Young Shulamit in the 1940s.

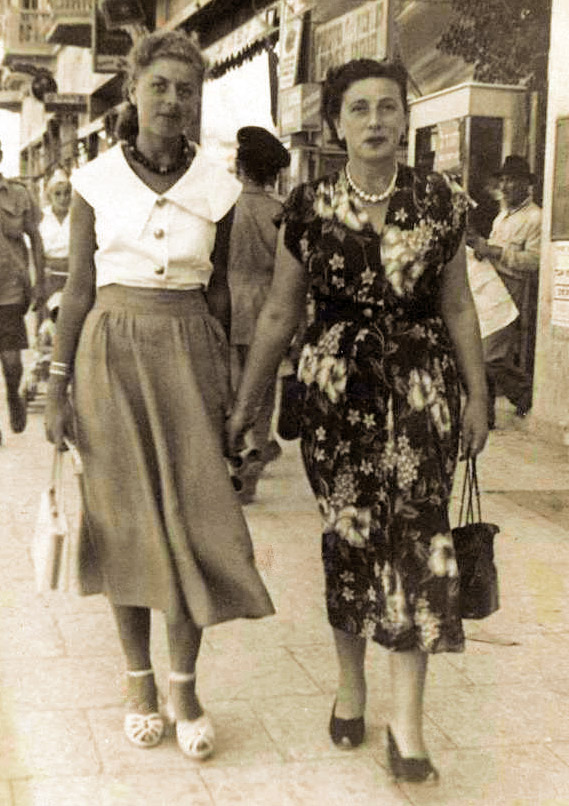
Shulamit Aloni as a young woman with her mother.

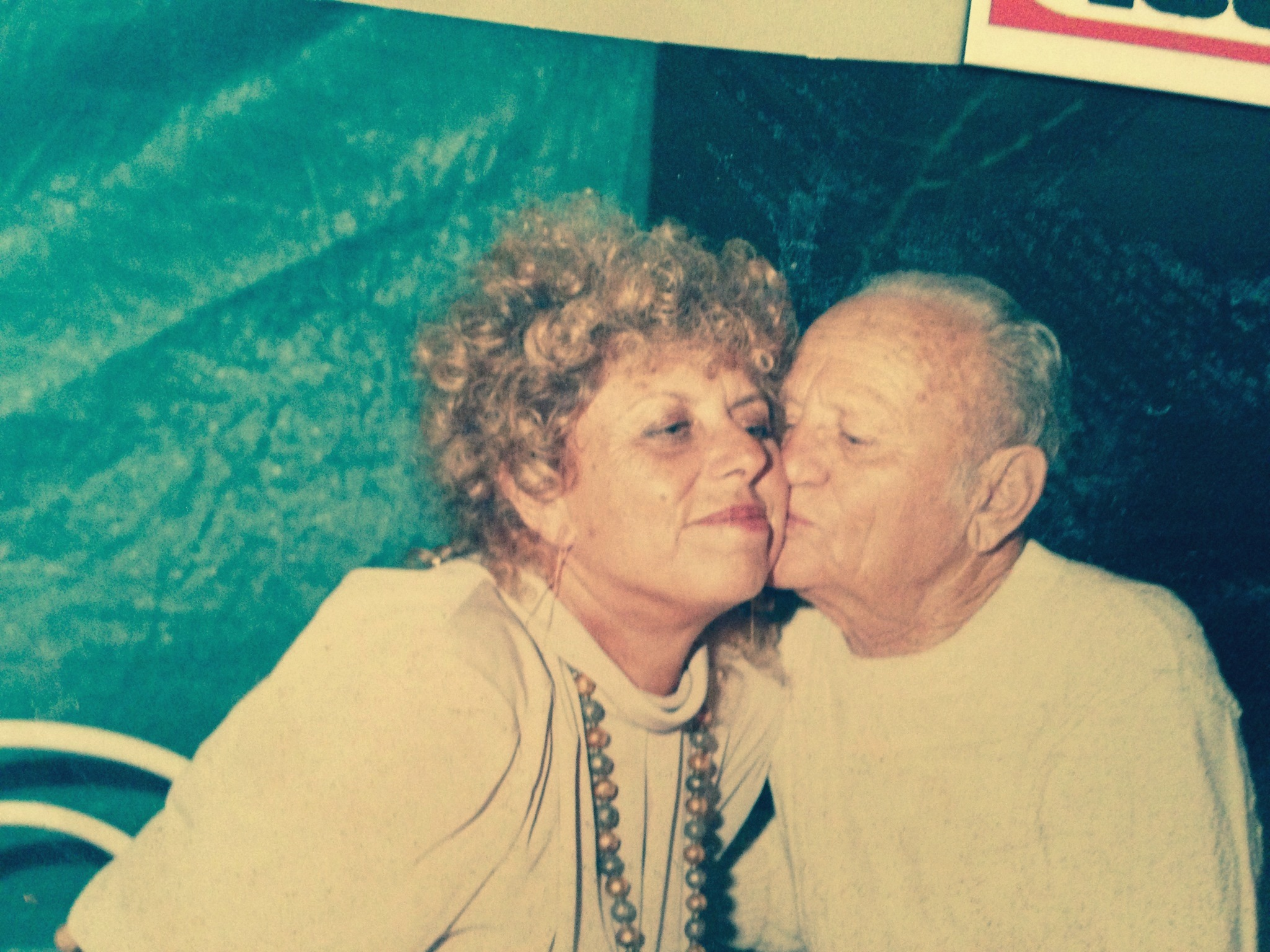
Shulamit and Reuven Aloni in the 1980s.

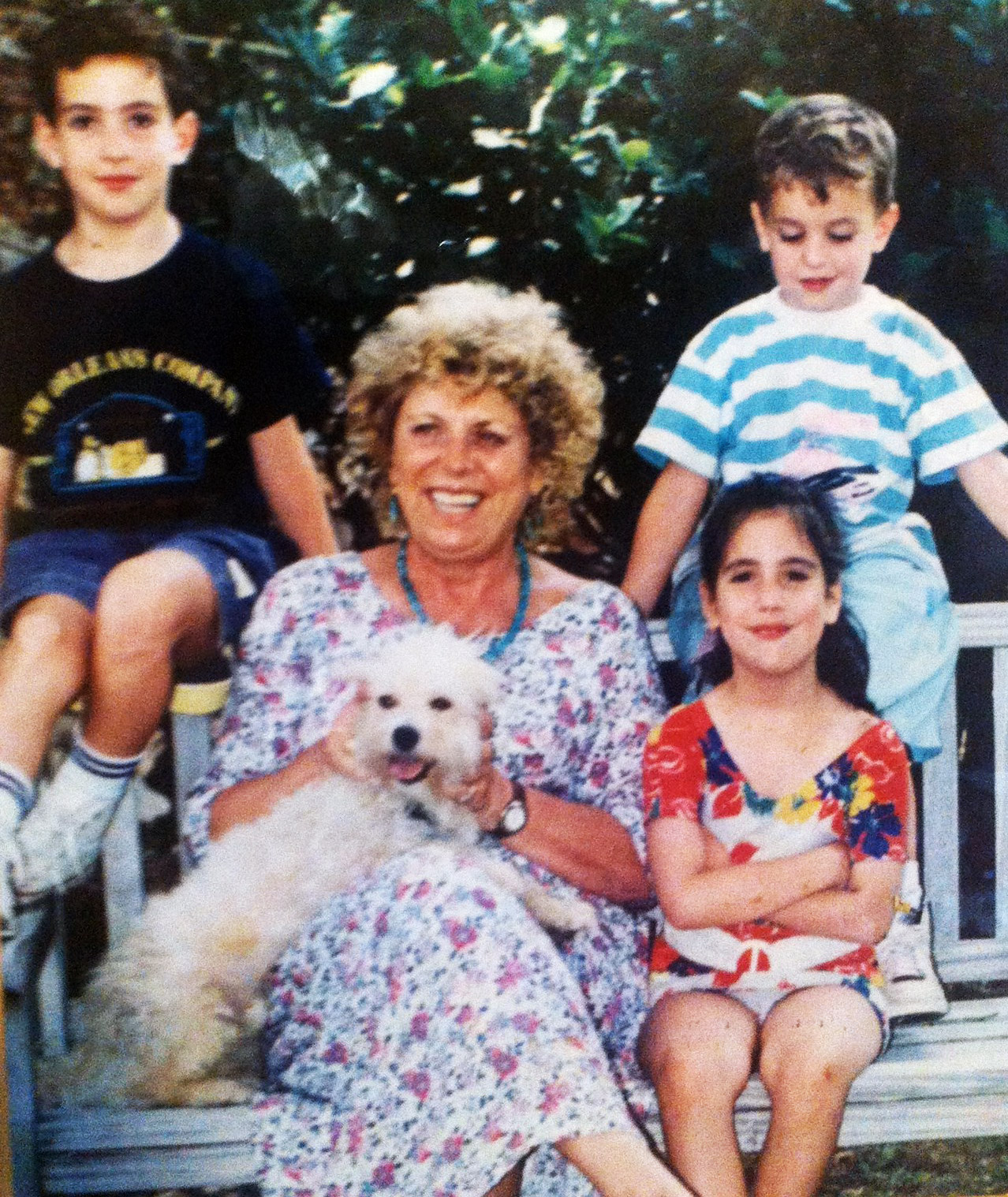
Aloni with grandchildren in the 2000s.

She was an atheist.

== Shulamit Aloni Prize ==
In 2018, the Shulamit Aloni Prize was established. The prize is awarded by the Shulamit Aloni Foundation, a non-profit organization created by a group of Aloni's family members and leading media and cultural professionals for this purpose. The prize, which bears a monetary award, is bestowed to its recipients each year in the Jaffa Theater (aka The Arab-Hebrew Theater), to creators of cultural works (theater, film, poetry and prose) in both Hebrew and Arabic whose work promotes human rights. Inaugural prize recipients included Rana Abu Fraihah (Arabic Culture Prize), Renana Raz (Hebrew Culture Prize) and Sami Michael (Lifetime Achievement Prize). Additional prize recipients include Ayat Abou Shmeiss for Arabic Culture, and Achinoam Nini for Lifetime Achievement.

== Awards and recognition ==
- In 1994, received an honorary PhD in Humanities from Hebrew Union College.
- In 1994, received an honorary PhD of Law from Kon-Kuk University.
- In 1998, Aloni received a special lifetime award of the Emil Grunzweig Human Rights Award by the Association for Civil Rights in Israel.
- In 1999, received an honorary PhD of Philosophy from the Weitzman Institute of Science.
- In 2000, she received the Israel Prize, for her lifetime achievements and special contribution to society and the State of Israel.

== Published works ==
- The Citizen and His Country, 1958
- Children's Rights in Israel,1964 (Hebrew)
- The Arrangement - From a State of Law to a State of Religion, on Relations Between State and Religion, 1970 (Hebrew)
- Women as Human Beings, 1976 (Hebrew)
- "Up the down escalator" in Sisterhood Is Global: The International Women's Movement Anthology, ed. Robin Morgan, 1984.
- Democracy in Shackles (Demokratia be'azikim), Am Oved (in Hebrew)
- Israel: Democracy or Ethnocracy? published in 2008

== See also ==
- List of Israel Prize recipients
