= Leon Dycian =

Israeli politician

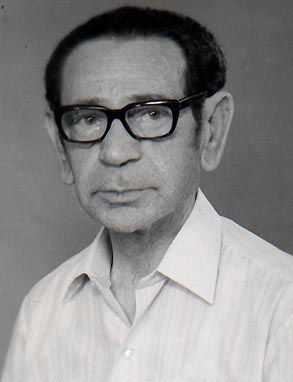
- Dycian in the mid-1970s

Faction represented in the Knesset
- 1974–1977: Likud

Personal details
- Born: 17 November 1911 Janów, Russian Empire
- Died: 1 March 1984 (aged 72)

Leon Dycian (Hebrew: ליאון דיציאן; 17 November 1911 – 1 March 1984) was an Israeli politician who served as a member of the Knesset for Likud between 1974 and 1977.

== Biography ==
Born in Janów (now in Poland) in 1911, Dycian attended university and was certified as a lawyer. He emigrated to Mandatory Palestine in 1935. He joined the Liberal Party and was a member of the Histadrut trade union's executive committee.

In 1973 he was elected to the Knesset on the Likud list, an alliance of Herut, the Liberal Party and several other small right-wing parties. He sat on the Committee for Public Services and the Labor Committee, before losing his seat in the 1977 elections.

He died in 1984 at the age of 72.
