= Ben-Zion Keshet =

Israeli politician (1914–1984)

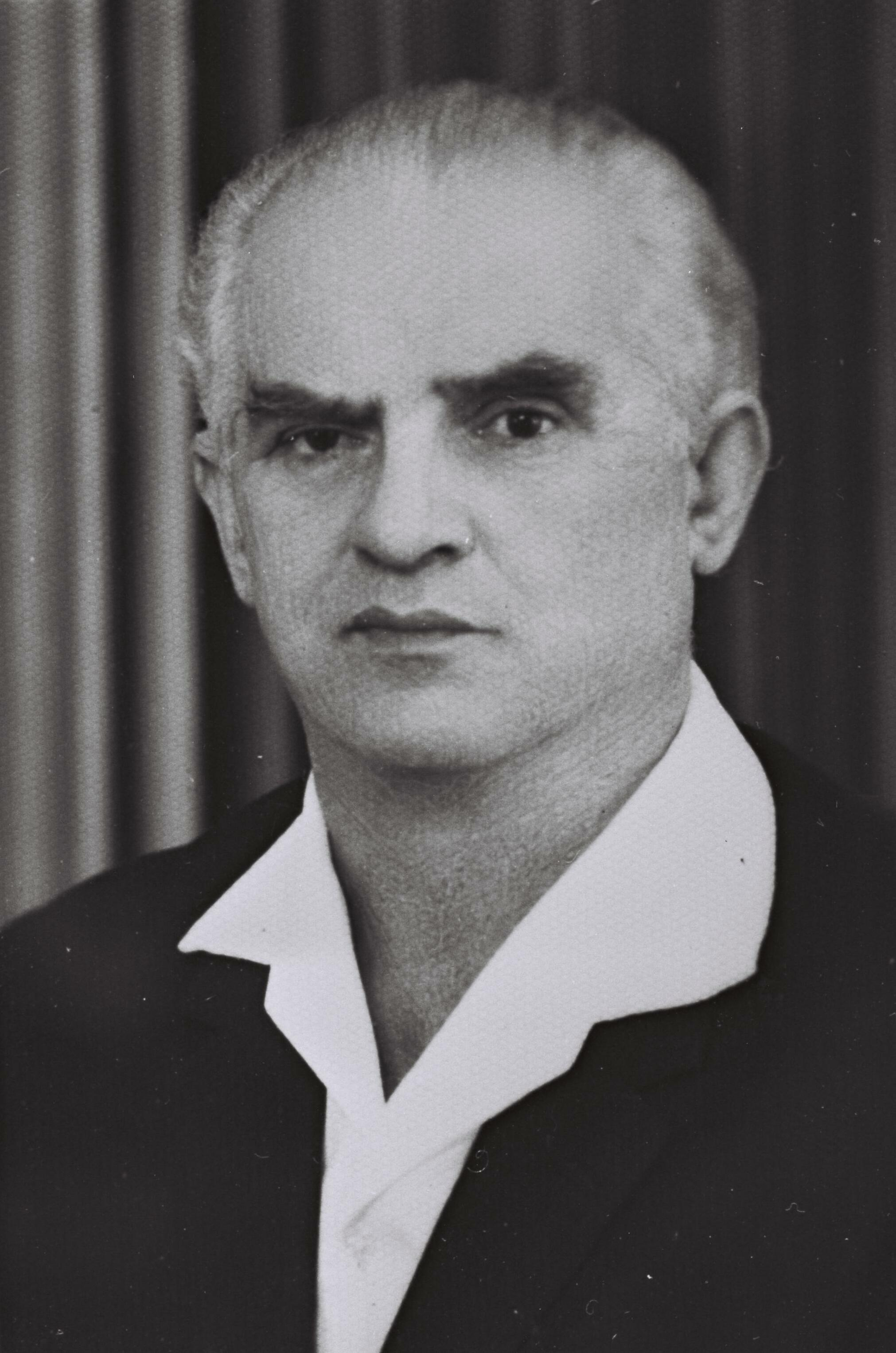
- Keshet in 1969

Faction represented in the Knesset
- 1969–1974: Gahal
- 1974–1977: Likud

Personal details
- Born: 5 August 1914 Riga, Russian Empire
- Died: 8 August 1984 (aged 70)

Ben-Zion Keshet (Hebrew: בן-ציון קשת; 5 August 1914 – 8 August 1984) was an Israeli politician.

== Biography ==
Born on 5 August 1914, in Riga, Russian Empire (today in Latvia), Keshet attended a Hebrew high school in his home city. He joined the Betar youth movement and helped establish the Estonian branch in 1932. In 1934, he made aliyah to Mandatory Palestine, where he became a member of the governing council of Betar in 1935. He also became a member of Betar's enlistment battalion and of the central committee of the National Labour Federation in Eretz-Israel, on which he served between 1939 and 1942. From 1942 until 1943, he was a member of the general staff of the Irgun, before being exiled to Eritrea in 1944.

He returned to Israel in 1948 and was amongst the founding members of Herut, chairing its municipal department. He was a member of the Public Council for Soviet Jewry and was on the Controller Committee of Housing Ministry. In 1969, he was elected to the Knesset on the Gahal list (an alliance of Herut and the Liberal Party) and became a Deputy Speaker. He was re-elected in 1973, by which time Gahal had merged into Likud, did not run for re-election in 1977. Between 1982 and 1984 he was chairman of the board of directors at the Jabotinsky Institute, before dying on 8 August 1984, aged 70.
