= Yedidia Be'eri =

Israeli politician

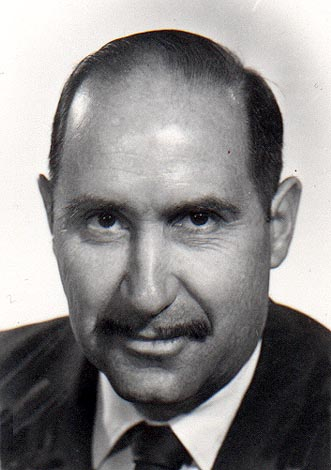
- Be'eri in the mid-1970s

Faction represented in the Knesset
- 1974–1977: Likud

Personal details
- Born: 30 January 1931 Beuthen, Germany
- Died: 1 July 2004 (aged 73)

Yedidia Be'eri (Hebrew: ידידיה בארי; 30 January 1931 – 1 July 2004) was an Israeli politician who served as a member of the Knesset for Likud between 1974 and 1977.

== Biography ==
Born in Beuthen in Germany (now Bytom in Poland), Be'eri emigrated to Mandatory Palestine in 1938. He attended the Balfour gymnasium in Tel Aviv, before studying law at Tel Aviv University and gaining certification as a lawyer.

A member of the Irgun, he was injured during the 1948 Arab-Israeli War. He was amongst the Zionist Youth leadership in the Betar movement, and was also a member of the young leadership of the General Zionists. In 1965 he joined the leadership of the Liberal Party, and chaired the Young Israel movement between 1967 and 1969. He also became a member of the Movement for Greater Israel's directorate.

In 1973 he was elected to the Knesset on the Likud list, an alliance of Herut, the Liberal Party and several small right-wing groups including the Movement for Greater Israel. He took his seat in 1974, but lost it in the 1977 elections.

Outside politics he worked as a legal advisor for Malraz (the Public Council for Prevention of Noise, Radiation and Air Pollution in Israel) and chaired the organisation's board.

He died in 2004 at the age of 73.
