= Ayat Abou Shmeiss =

Palestinian poet

Iaat Abou Shmeiss ايات ابو شميس
- Born: 1984 (age 41–42); Jaffa
- Occupation: Poet
- Writing career
- Notable works: A Basket Full of Silent Languages; I Am Two
- Notable awards: Emerging Poets Award, Ministry of Culture

Ayat Abou Shmeiss (Arabic: ايات ابو شميس; born 1984) is an Arab-Israeli poet from Jaffa.

== Biography ==
Abou Shmeiss was born in Jaffa. Her mother, who was illiterate and insisted she get the best and broadest education possible. As a result, she completed her schooling at the French Jaffa school College de Ferrer, and speaks five languages: Arabic, Hebrew, French, English and Spanish. She is the second of four children.

Her first book of poetry, A Basket Full of Silent Languages (סל מלא שפות שותקות) came out in 2013, in both Arabic and Hebrew. Her second, I Am Two (אני זה שניים), also a bilingual volume, was published in 2018.

Abou Shmeiss, who writes in Hebrew, won the Emerging Poets Award from the Israel Ministry of Culture in 2015. She has stated that she is constantly asked about this choice, whether simply because it seems odd to write in a language that is not one's native tongue, or because it is akin to "sleeping with the enemy". Abou Shmeiss says it was only years after beginning to write in Hebrew that she acknowledged that it is indeed a form of colonialism or occupation, but that it came naturally for her to write in Hebrew – to her Arabic is a holy language, the language of the Quran, and she would be diminishing it by writing her everyday thoughts and feeling. Her second collection, I Am Two, expresses this duality. She says that to Israelis, if she writes about her Palestinian identity, they view her as a traitor, and Palestinians view her that way because she writes in the language of their oppressor. She says, however, "I have learned to live in halves". For all the reasons she gives, those that are intentional and those she likes less, she says "I will probably never stop writing in Hebrew, thinking in Hebrew, and also dreaming. And my mother tongue is reserved for those who are close to me, and for God, mostly for God."

Her duality is not only as a Palestinian citizen of Israel. Abou Shmeiss is a feminist, wears short clothing by Muslim standards, and has tattoos, but also prays five times a day and fasts on Ramadan. She defines herself as a religious Muslim.

The content of her poetry, however, is entirely derived from all aspects of her life: As a resident of Jaffa, a conquered city, as a marginalized minority, as a woman, as a member of her family, and more. She has participated in the burgeoning political poetry scene, such as Guerrilla Culture and Ars Poetica, the Mizrahi venue founded by Adi Keissar. She has read her poetry in other cultural venues, and has been asked to participate in international festivals, and contribute to various women's writing projects, such as "Women's Ramadan", a 2016 project by the feminist online magazine "Politically Corret", which featured an article about a pioneering Muslim woman, from various disciplines and fields, each day of the Ramadan holiday. Some of her poems have been translated and published in English.

In 2015, independent filmmaker Noga Kalinsky made a short film about Abou Shmeiss, called "Silent Languages".

Both her books have been highly praised by critics.

Abou Shmeiss is married to Ahmed, and has one son, Mahmoud. Iaat and Ahmed became engaged when she was 15 and he 17, and were married when she was 18.

== Works ==
- סל מלא שפות שותקות / A Basket Full of Silent Languages, Mitan, Tel Aviv 2013
- אני זה שניים / I Am Two, Mitan, Tel Aviv 2018

== Awards ==
- Shulamit Aloni Prize (I Am Two, Arabic Culture Prize), 2019
- Sami Michael Award for Social Justice, 2020
