= Zita Linker =

Israeli politician (1917–2009)

- ציטה לינקר
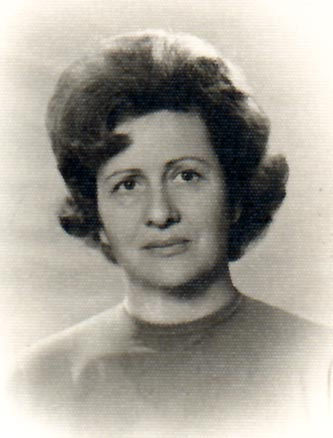

Faction represented in the Knesset
- 1977: Likud

Personal details
- Born: 1 March 1917; Vienna, Austria-Hungary
- Died: 26 January 2009 (aged 91)

Zita Linker (Hebrew: ציטה לינקר; 1 March 1917 – 26 January 2009) was an Israeli politician who briefly served as a member of the Knesset for Likud in 1977.

== Biography ==
Born in Vienna in Austria-Hungary, Linker attended high school in her home city, and university in London. She emigrated to Mandatory Palestine in 1934.

She joined the General Zionists, which merged into the Liberal Party in 1959. She became a member of the Board of Liberal Women, and of the party's central committee and executive council, as well as serving as a delegate to various Zionist Congresses.

In 1973 she was on the Likud list (an alliance of the Liberal Party, Herut and several other right-wing parties) for the Knesset elections that year. Although she failed to win a seat, she entered the Knesset on 21 January 1977 as a replacement for Shmuel Tamir, who had resigned his seat after leaving Likud. However, Linker lost her seat in the May 1977 elections.

She died in 2009 at the age of 91.
