= Boaz Moav =

Israeli politician

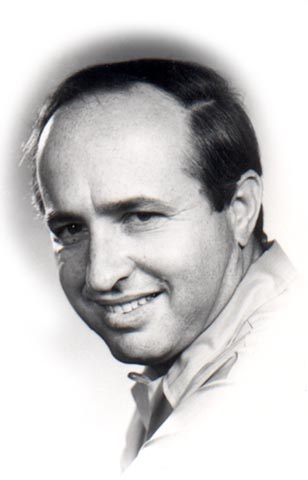
- Moav in the 1970s

Faction represented in the Knesset
- 1974–1975: Ratz
- 1975–1976: Ya'ad – Civil Rights Movement
- 1976–1977: Ratz

Personal details
- Born: 3 April 1938 Tel Aviv, Mandatory Palestine
- Died: 16 January 2002 (aged 63)

Dr Boaz Moav (Hebrew: בועז מואב; 3 April 1938 – 16 January 2002) was an Israeli academic, politician and activist.

== Biography ==
Born in Tel Aviv during the Mandate era, Moav was a member of HaNoar HaOved youth movement. He attended Tel Aviv University and the University of Pennsylvania, where he was awarded a PhD in microbiology. He later worked as a lecturer at Tel Aviv University and was a member of the board of the Malraz environmental organisation.

Formerly a member of Mapai, Moav was amongst the founders of Ratz in 1973. He was elected to the Knesset on the party's list in the elections later that year. He served as deputy chairman of the party's directorate and head of its Citizens Complaints bureau. He lost his seat in the 1977 elections when the party was reduced to a single seat.

He died in 2002 at the age of 63.
