= Marcia Freedman =

American-Israeli peace, women's rights and gay rights activist (1938–2021)

- מרשה פרידמן
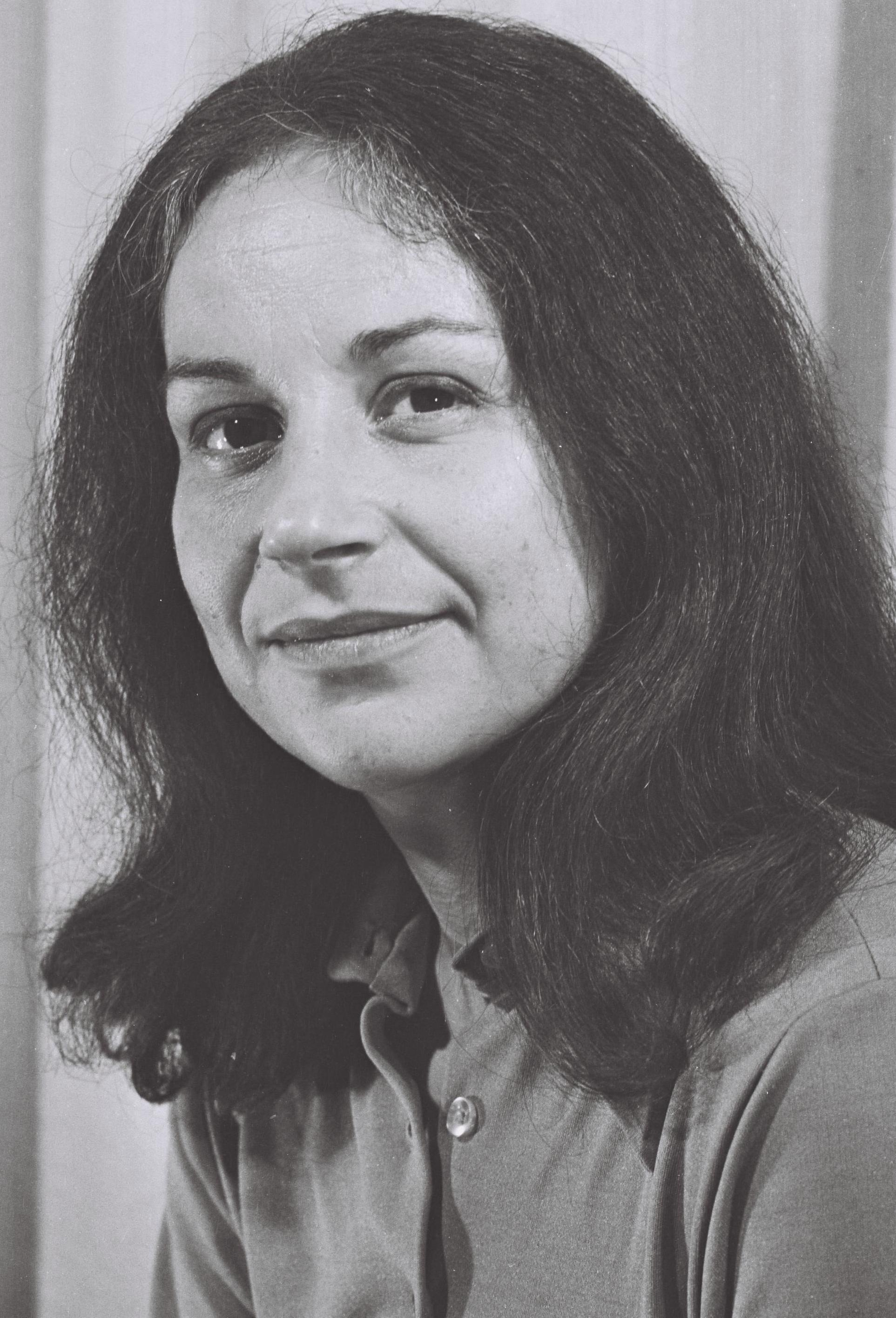
- Freedman in 1974

Faction represented in the Knesset
- 1974–1975: Ratz
- 1975–1976: Ya'ad – Civil Rights Movement
- 1976–1977: Independent Socialist Faction

Personal details
- Born: Marcia Judith Prince; May 17, 1938 Newark, New Jersey, US
- Died: September 21, 2021 (aged 83) South Berkeley, California, United States
- Spouse: Bill Freedman (m. 1961; div. 1975)
- Children: 1 daughter
- Education: New York University

Marcia Judith Freedman (Hebrew: מרשה פרידמן; née Prince; May 17, 1938 – September 21, 2021) was an American-Israeli activist and politician. She advocated for a two-state solution to the Israeli–Palestinian conflict, as well as for women's and gay rights. Born in Newark, New Jersey, Freedman immigrated to Israel in 1969, where she played a leading role in the development of the second-wave feminist movement during the 1970s. She served as a member of the Knesset from 1973 to 1977.

== Biography ==
Born into a Jewish family in Newark, New Jersey, on May 17, 1938, Freedman earned a Bachelor of Arts degree from Bennington College and a Master of Arts degree from New York University. Between 1960 and 1967, she participated in the American civil rights movement. She immigrated to Israel in 1969, where she became active in social and political causes.

Freedman gained public attention for her efforts to reform abortion laws and advance feminist issues in Israel. In 1973, the Israeli feminist movement chose to support Shulamit Aloni’s Ratz party, and Freedman was placed third on its electoral list. The party won three seats in the 1973 Israeli legislative election, resulting in Freedman’s election to the Knesset. Ratz merged into Ya’ad – Civil Rights Movement in 1975, but in 1976 Freedman and Aryeh Eliav left to form the Social-Democratic Faction, later renamed the Independent Socialist Faction. Freedman served as a member of the Knesset from 1973 to 1977.

Before the 1977 Israeli legislative election, Freedman established the Women’s Party, although she did not run as its candidate. The party did not pass the electoral threshold but contributed to raising awareness of women’s issues in Israel. During her tenure in the Knesset, Freedman addressed topics that had previously received little public discussion in Israel, including domestic violence, rape, incest, child prostitution, and breast cancer.

To prepare for the 1976 Knesset debate about violence against women, she gathered information from different women's organizations, including WIZO and the Citizen Counseling Service. She also placed ads asking women to share their experiences of abuse. She received dozens of letters talking about domestic violence and how it was difficult to receive help. This helped Freedman propasal reicve enough votes to advance in the Interior Committee.

In addition to her work on women’s rights, Freedman became increasingly engaged with discussions on Israeli–Palestinian relations and was among the early Israeli Jewish proponents of the two-state solution. She was involved with communications with the Palestine Liberation Organization. In a 2015 interview with the American Jewish Peace Archive, she described her involvement in foreign policy as unplanned, stemming from her position in the Knesset.

Freedman became active in promoting gay rights and came out as a lesbian after her Knesset term ended. She became a strong advocate for Gay Rights movements because she came out as a lesbian to her daughter and her daughter started to isolate from her.

Freedman contributed to the creation of advocacy and support networks for women in Israel. Along with Barbara Swersky and others, she co-founded Israel’s first women's shelter, established in Haifa in 1977. In 1980, Freedman authored the article "Feminist Publishing in Israel" in the Women’s Studies Newsletter, discussing the limited availability of feminist works in Hebrew and the efforts of a small number of publishers to support such publications.

Freedman returned to the United States in 1981 and lived again in Israel between 1997 and 2002, during which she founded the Community of Learning Women, an organization focused on women's studies and computer literacy.

Her memoir, Exile in the Promised Land, was dedicated to her father, whose example she cited as influential in her life. Freedman also wrote numerous articles and reviews. She was the founding president of Brit Tzedek v’Shalom, a Zionist organization supporting a two-state solution, which merged into J Street in 2010. She also served as president of the San Francisco Jewish Film Festival.

Freedman married Bill Freedman in 1961; the marriage ended in the 1970s. They had one daughter, Jennifer. Marcia Freedman died on September 21, 2021, at the age of 83. At the time of her death, she remained the only open lesbian to have served in the Knesset.

== See also ==
- List of peace activists
