= Hillel Seidel =

Israeli politician (1920–1999)

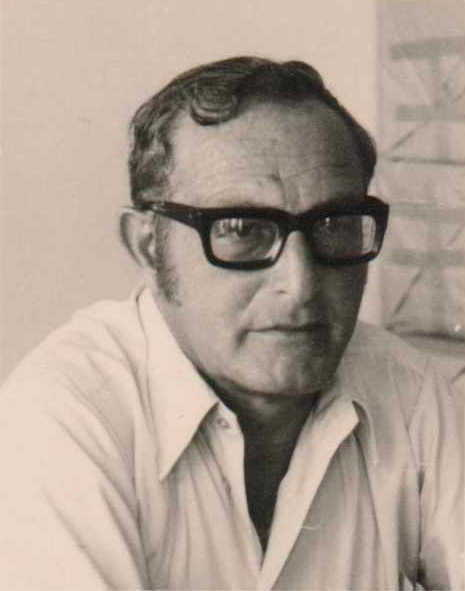

Faction represented in the Knesset
- 1974–1977: Independent Liberals
- 1977–1981: Likud

Personal details
- Born: 9 October 1920 Kraków, Poland
- Died: 14 February 1999 (aged 78)

Hillel Seidel (Hebrew: הלל זיידל; 9 October 1920 – 14 February 1999) was an Israeli politician who served as a member of the Knesset for the Independent Liberals and Likud between 1974 and 1981.

== Biography ==
Born in Kraków in Poland, Seidel was educated in a heder and yeshiva, before attending the College of Economic Studies in Vilnius. A member of the Akiva youth movement, he was involved with the anti-Nazi underground movement in the Vilna Ghetto, and headed the underground in the Klooga concentration camp. After World War II he headed the Akiva movement in Poland until 1947, and was a commander of the Berihah movement until the end of 1947.

In 1948 he emigrated to Israel, where he became head of the Immigrant Absorption department of the World Confederation of General Zionists, a post he held until 1952. He also became secretary general of the HaOved HaTzioni movement and a member of the Progressive Party's directorate.

From 1952 until 1959 he was a member of the Histadrut's organising committee, and head of its Pensions department, before becoming head of the union's Immigrant Absorption department, a post he held until 1973.

In 1973 he was elected to the Knesset on the Independent Liberals list. However, on 15 February 1977 he left the party to establish the Ahdut faction, joining Likud. He was re-elected later that year on the Likud list and chaired the Public Petitions Committee. He lost his seat in the 1981 elections.

He died in 1999 at the age of 78.
