= Independent Socialist Faction =

Independent Socialist Faction סיעה סוציאליסטית עצמאית
- Leader: Aryeh Eliav; Marcia Freedman
- Founder: Aryeh Eliav; Marcia Freedman
- Founded: 27 January 1976
- Dissolved: 1977
- Split from: Ya'ad – Civil Rights Movement
- Merged into: Left Camp of Israel
- Ideology: Socialism (Israeli)
- Political position: Left-wing
- Most MKs: 2 (1976–1977)
- Fewest MKs: 2 (1976–1977)

The Independent Socialist Faction (Hebrew: סיעה סוציאליסטית עצמאית, Sia'a Sotzialistit Atzma'it) was a political party in Israel in the 1970s.

== Background ==
The party was established on 27 January 1976, during the eighth Knesset, as the Social-Democratic Faction, when Aryeh Eliav and Marcia Freedman left Ya'ad – Civil Rights Movement. Prior to its creation, Aryeh Eliav had broken away from the Alignment and merged with Ratz to form Ya'ad. On 3 February the new faction was renamed the Independent Socialist Faction.

Prior to the 1977 elections, the party merged with several other small left-wing parties, including Meri, Moked, and some members of the Black Panthers to form the Left Camp of Israel, whilst Freedman created the Women's Party. The Left Camp of Israel won only two seats, which were held in rotation by five party members including Eliav, whilst the Women's Party failed to cross the electoral threshold and subsequently disappeared.
