= Ratz (political party) =

Movement for Civil Rights and Peace התנועה לזכויות האזרח ולשלום
- Leader: Shulamit Aloni; Yossi Sarid; Gabi Deus (de jure)
- Founder: Shulamit Aloni
- Founded: 1973
- Dissolved: 1997 (de facto)
- Split from: Alignment
- Merged into: Meretz
- Ideology: Labor Zionism; Liberal socialism; Progressivism; Anti-clericalism; Pacifism
- Political position: Left-wing
- National affiliation: Alignment (1981-1984); Meretz (1992-1997)
- Colors: Red
- Slogan: "העובדות מצביעות רצ" (The facts point to/vote for Ratz) (1988)
- Most MKs: 6 (1992)

Election symbol
- רצ

Ratz (Hebrew: רָצ), officially the Movement for Civil Rights and Peace (Hebrew: הַתְּנוּעָה לִזְכוּיוֹת הָאֶזְרָח וְלַשָּׁלוֹם, HaTnua'a LeZkhuyot HaEzrah VeLaShalom) was a left-wing political party in Israel that focused on human rights, civil rights and women's rights. It was active from 1973 until its formal merger into Meretz in 1997.

== History ==
Shulamit Aloni had been a member of the Knesset from 1965 to 1969, in the governing Alignment party. She was bitter rivals with the party leader, Prime Minister Golda Meir, whom she blamed for her absence from party's candidate list in 1969 and again in 1973. This, and the advice of her family and friends, convinced her to start her own party. Aloni herself did not have the necessary signatures to run an election list, but was approached by the new American immigrant Marcia Freedman, a feminist activist, who had collected enough signatures for a feminist candidacy. She wanted the well-known Aloni to lead this list, who agreed and submitted the list just 48 hours after the Alignment refused to stand her for election. The new party was called The Movement for Civil Rights and Peace.

In its first test, the 1973 elections, the party received 2% of the vote and won three seats in the Knesset, which were taken by Aloni, Freedman, and Boaz Moav. The party soon gained the popular name Ratz, as it used the letters Resh-Tzadik on the election ballot paper. Following Golda Meir's resignation, the party joined Yitzhak Rabin's government and Aloni served as a minister without portfolio. This was one of the few periods in Israel's political history when no religious parties were part of the coalition. The arrangement lasted for a few months only and when the National Religious Party joined the coalition, Ratz left it.

In 1975 the party merged with Aryeh Eliav, an independent MK who had broken away from the Alignment, to form a new party, Ya'ad – Civil Rights Movement. However, it broke up the following year, and Aloni and Moaz reformed Ratz. Freedman did not return, instead forming the Social-Democratic Faction (later renamed the Independent Socialist Faction) with Eliav. One reason for the breakup was Eliav and Freedman's insistence on including Moked, the descendant of the communist Maki party, in Ya'ad, which Aloni refused.

Prior to the 1977 elections, the Independent Socialist Faction merged with several other small left-wing parties (Moked, Meri and the Black Panthers) to form the Left Camp of Israel, which reached out to Ratz to discuss a merger, though Aloni again declined to be in the same party as Moked. Marcia Freedman made her own Women's Party, which did not win any seats.

Ratz performed poorly in the 1977 elections, winning only one seat, which Aloni took. The 1981 elections were a repeat, with only Aloni representing the party in the Knesset. During the Knesset session she merged the party into the Alignment, but then broke away again before the term ended.

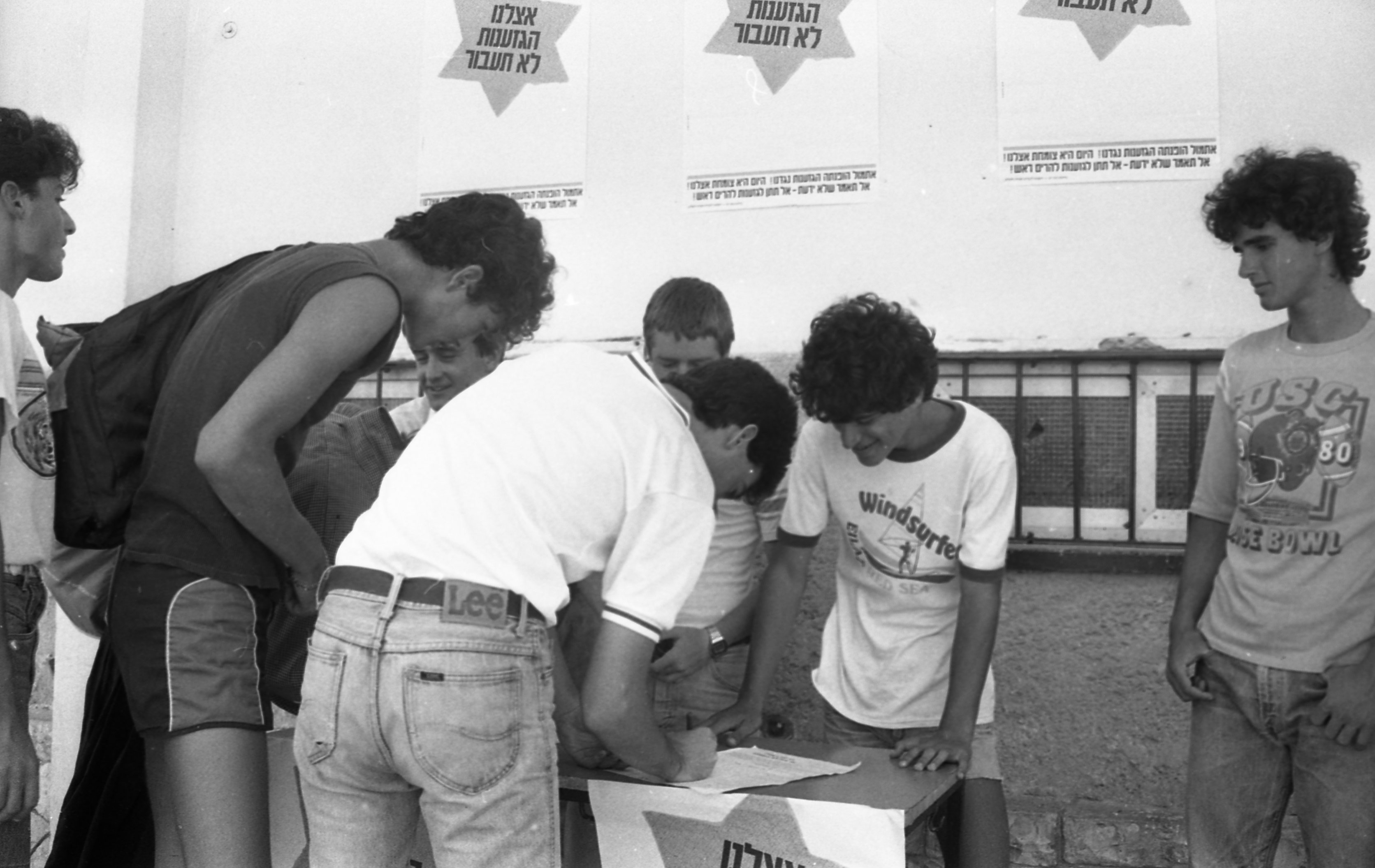
Ratz members in Herzliya solicting signatures for a petition against racism in 1984

Before the 1984 elections the Left Camp (who already lost their representation in 1981) disintegrated. The faction actively meeting with the PLO's Yasser Arafat left and established the Progressive List for Peace (which also became a critic of Ratz). The rump Left Camp merged into Ratz in a one-to-three ratio, bringing with them Ran Cohen among others. The elections were an improvement on the previous two, and saw the party win three seats. During the Knesset session, the party gained another two seats when Yossi Sarid and Mordechai Virshubski joined, defecting from the Alignment and Shinui respectively. The party retained its five-seat strength in the 1988 elections, although some opinion polls predicted the party to win up to eight. In the 1989 local elections, Ratz, Mapam and Shinui ran many joint lists. For example, Ratz and Shinui ran together in Jerusalem.

Prior to the 1992 elections the party formed an alliance with Mapam and Shinui named Meretz, whilst keeping their independent status within the union. The new party was a success, winning 12 seats, two more than the parties had held in the previous Knesset. Prior to the 1996 elections, Aloni finally lost the leadership of the party, defeated by Sarid in internal elections. She retired from politics immediately. In 1997 the merger was made official (though several Shinui members led by Avraham Poraz broke away to reform as an independent party, whilst David Zucker became an independent MK), and Ratz effectively ceased to exist. However, it remained a registered political party and submitted financial reports to the Party Registrar in 2010 and 2013.

== Ideology ==
Ratz was a Zionist, progressive and liberal socialist party. Economically, it supported Israel's welfare state, with the addition of a nationalised healthcare system. As a member of the Israeli peace camp it opposed the occupation of the West Bank and Gaza Strip and called for a peace settlement with the Palestine Liberation Organization from its birth. Shulamit Aloni and David Zucker were both prominent members of the Peace Now advocacy group. The party advocated secularism, the separation of religion and state, enhanced power of an independent judiciary, and civil rights, most notably women's rights, a topic that was very close to Aloni. The party also introduced the successful law to decriminalise homosexuality in 1988.

It was also a notable fighter against corruption and for a written constitution, and Aloni was the initiator of the Knesset sub-committee for basic laws (Israel's equivalent of a constitution). During the 1970s, it supported electoral reform to introduce a form of the single transferable vote, with multiple smaller electoral districts and a mechanism for leveling seats. Due to these progressive stances, scholars have compared Ratz to Europe's green parties.

The party pledged to end Haredi draft-dodging from the Israel Defense Forces, and to stop racism and violence against Palestinians both inside and outside of Israel proper. This was strengthened by the participation of many Ratz members (most notably Zehava Galon, later Meretz leader) in the human rights organisation B'Tselem, which has been critical of Israel government actions against Palestinians. By 1988, the party came out in support of the gradual establishment of a Palestinian state as part of a two-state solution, while demanding the PLO to stop terrorism.

The party's voter base consisted mainly of affluent, suburban voters, a demographic which was also attracted to the centrist Shinui. For example, in the 1989 local elections, the richest families in the affluent city of Ramat HaSharon voted for Ratz and Shinui.

== Election results ==
Election	Leader	Votes	%	Seats	+/–	Status
1973	Shulamit Aloni	35,023	2.2	3 / 120	New	Opposition (1973–1974)
1973	Shulamit Aloni	35,023	2.2	3 / 120	New	Government (1974)
1973	Shulamit Aloni	35,023	2.2	3 / 120	New	Opposition (1974-1977)
1977	Shulamit Aloni	20,621	1.2	1 / 120	▼2	Opposition
1981	Shulamit Aloni	27,921	1.4	1 / 120	Steady	Opposition
1984	Shulamit Aloni	49,698	2.4	3 / 120	▲2	Opposition
1988	Shulamit Aloni	97,513	4.3	5 / 120	▲2	Opposition
1992	Shulamit Aloni	Part of Meretz		6 / 120	▲1	Government
1996	Yossi Sarid	Part of Meretz		4 / 120	▼2	Opposition

== Knesset members ==
Knesset (MKs)	Knesset Members
8th (3−1)	Shulamit Aloni, Boaz Moav − Marcia Freedman (to the Social-Democratic Faction)
9th (1)	Shulamit Aloni
10th (1)	Shulamit Aloni
11th (3+2)	Shulamit Aloni, Mordechai Bar-On (replaced by David Zucker), Ran Cohen + Yossi Sarid (from the Alignment) + Mordechai Virshubski (from Shinui)
12th (5)	Shulamit Aloni, Ran Cohen, Yossi Sarid, Mordechai Virshubski, David Zucker
13th (6 out of 12)	Shulamit Aloni, Ran Cohen, David Zucker, Yossi Sarid, Naomi Chazan, Binyamin Temkin
14th (4 out of 9)	Yossi Sarid, Ran Cohen, David Zucker, Naomi Chazan
