= Aryeh Eliav =

Israeli politician (1921–2010)

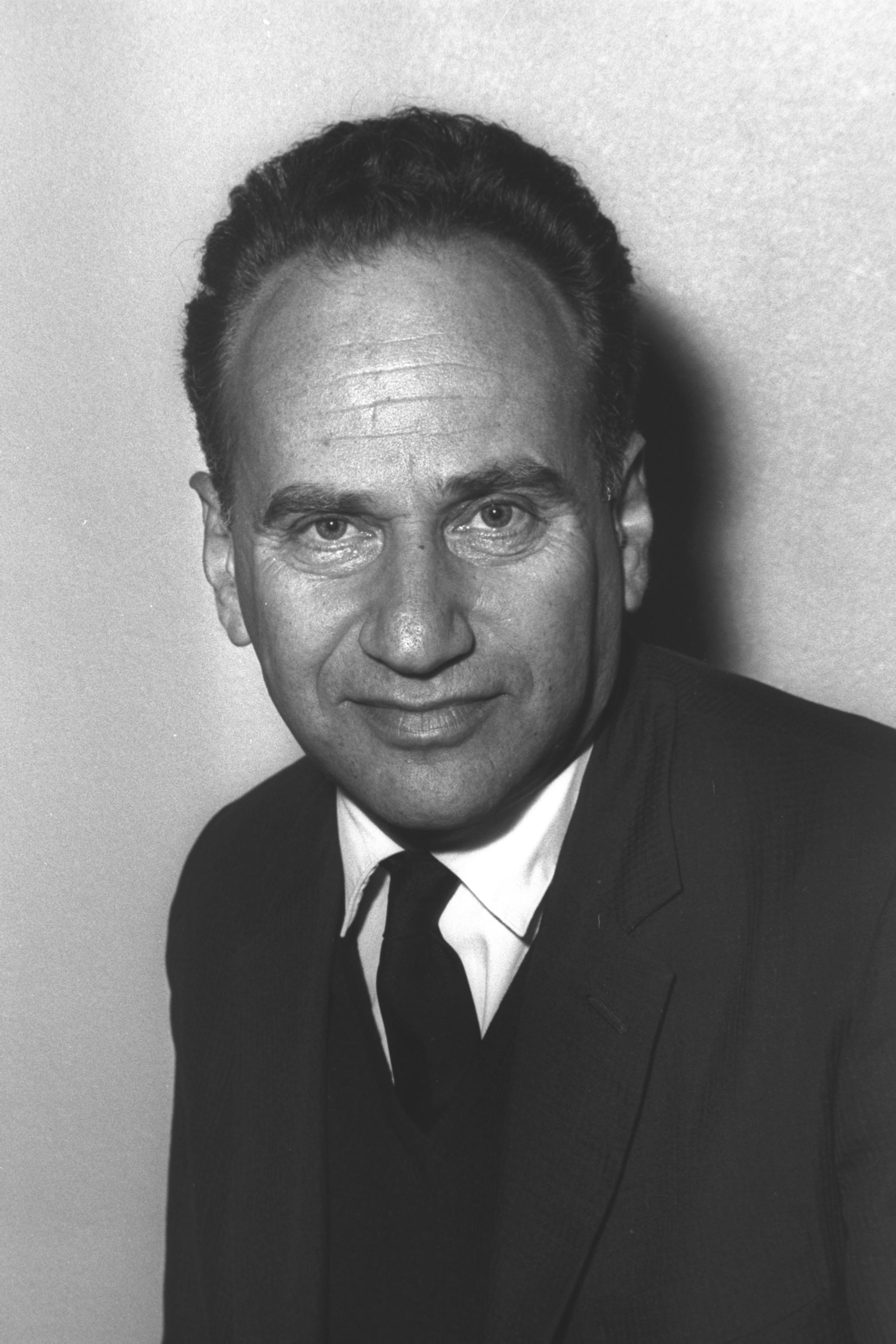
- Eliav in 1965

Faction represented in the Knesset
- 1965–1968: Alignment
- 1968–1969: Labor Party
- 1969–1975: Alignment
- 1975: Independent
- 1975–1976: Ya'ad – Civil Rights Movement
- 1976–1977: Independent Socialist Faction
- 1977–1979: Left Camp of Israel
- 1988–1991: Alignment
- 1991–1992: Labor Party

Personal details
- Born: 21 November 1921 Moscow, Russia
- Died: 30 May 2010 (aged 88) Tel Aviv, Israel

Aryeh "Lova" Eliav (Hebrew: אריה "לובה" אליאב; 21 November 1921 – 30 May 2010) was an Israeli politician, author, intellectual and peace and social activist. He served as a member of the Knesset for several factions in three spells between 1965 and 1992.

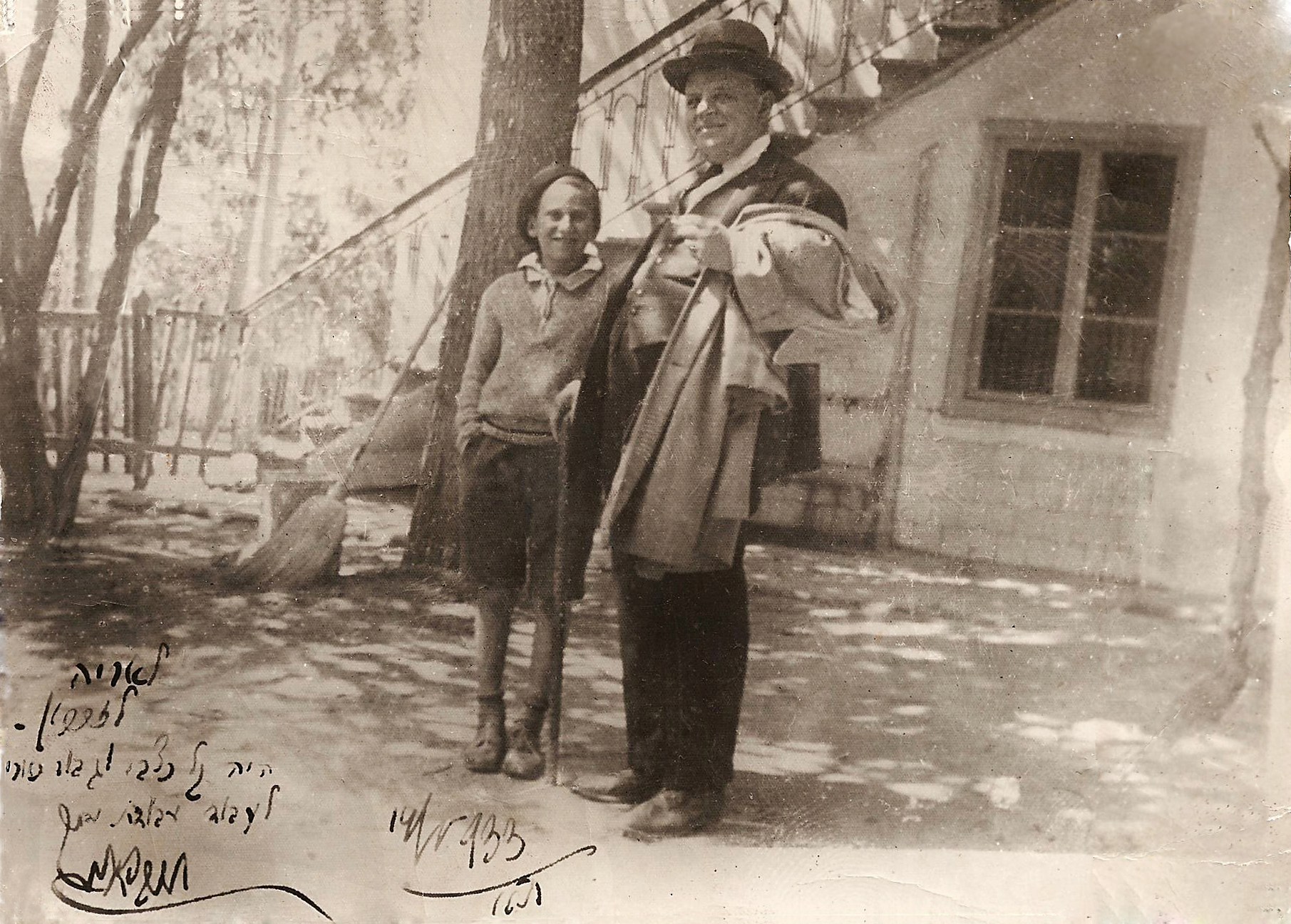
Eilav and Haim Nahman Bialik in 1933. The inscription reads: "to Aryeh, as a souvenir. May you be light as a gazelle and strong as a lion to work for your people."

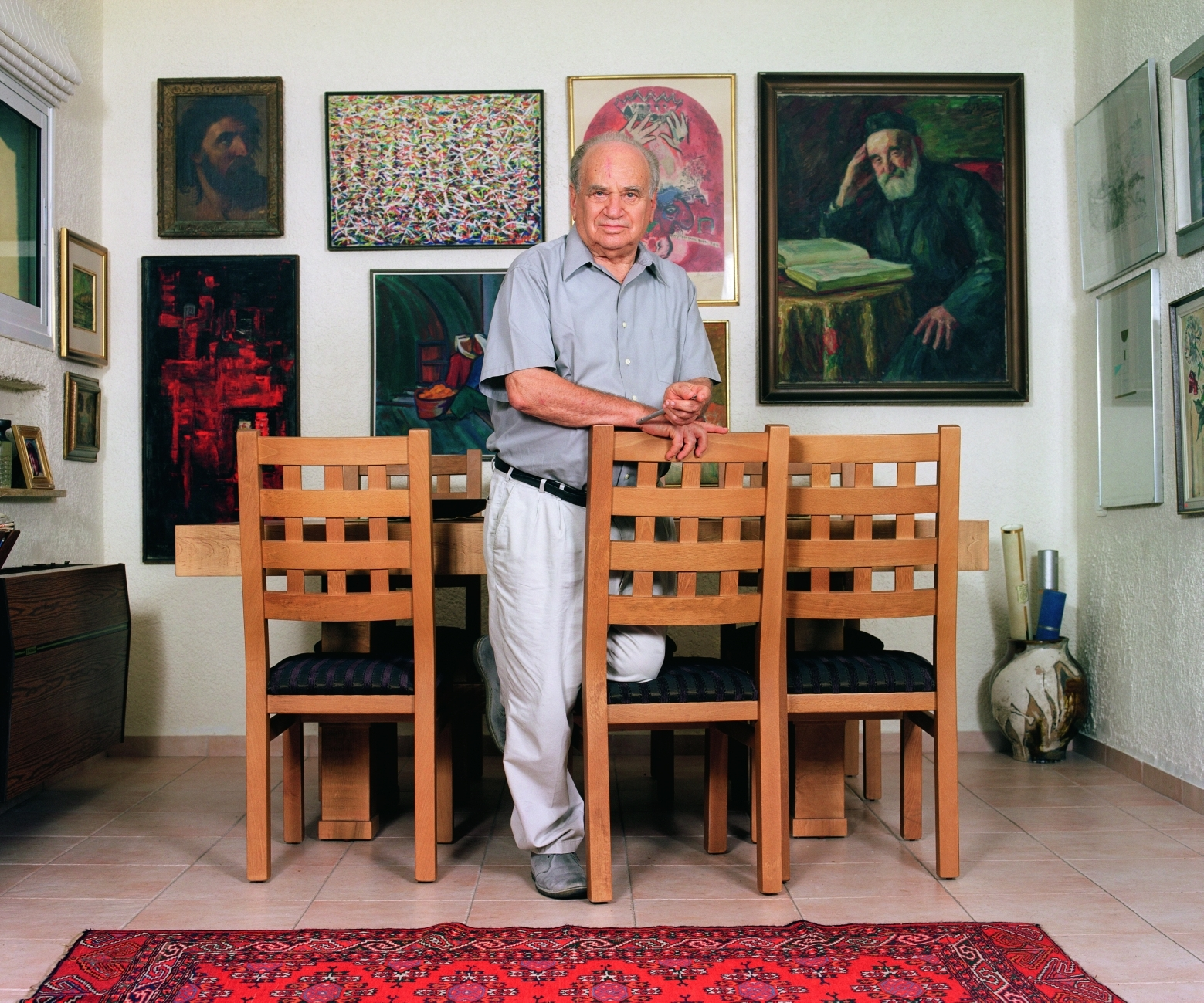
Eilav at home in 2004

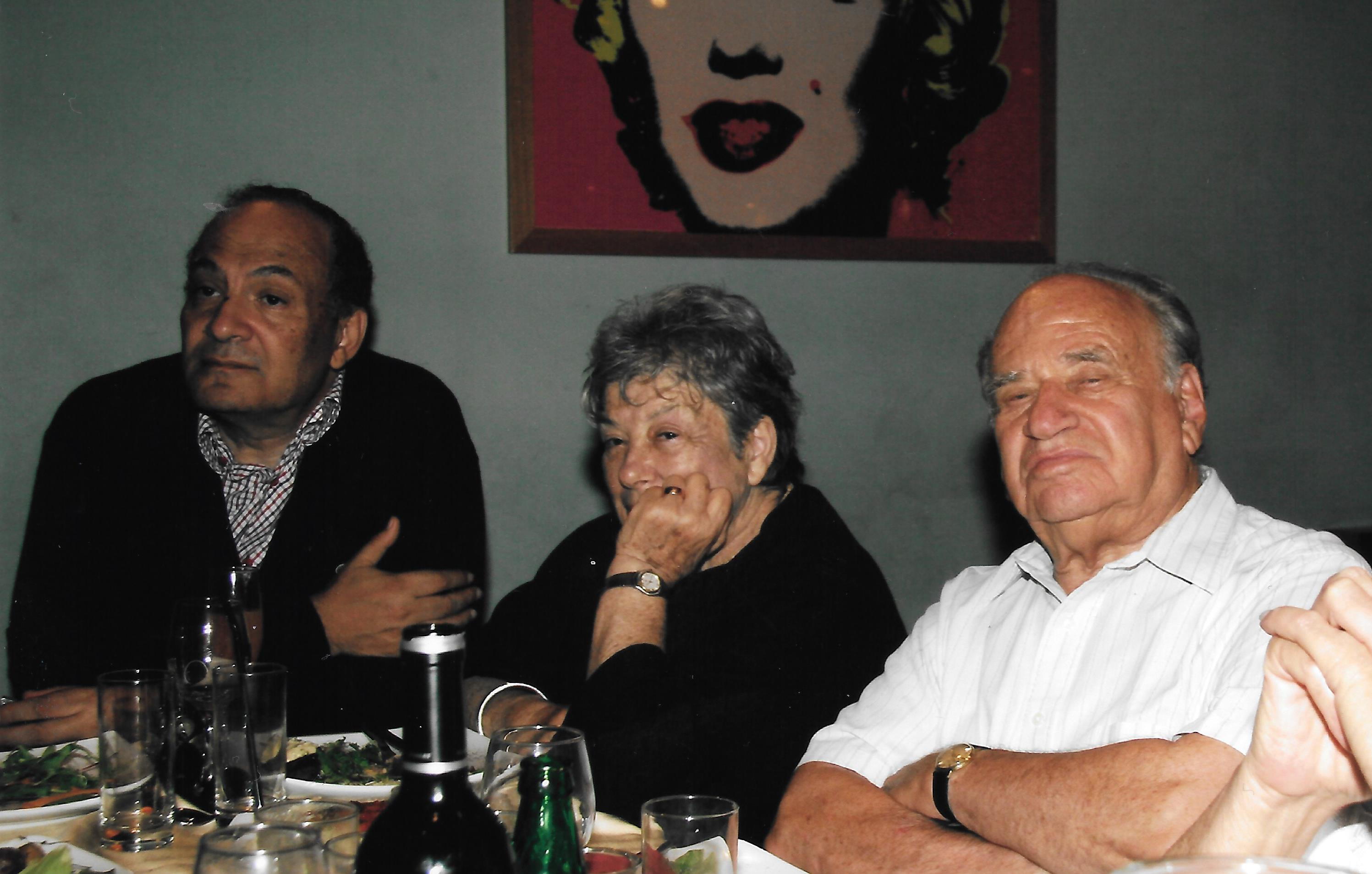
Lova and Tanya Eilav with the Egyptian ambassador to Israel Mohamed Assem Ibrahim, 2006.

== Biography ==
Lev Lipschitz (later Aryeh Eliav) was born in Moscow, Russia to Yosef and Matilda Lipschitz, both were Ashkenazi Jews. His family immigrated to Mandatory Palestine in 1924. He studied at the Halperin school and Herzliya Hebrew Gymnasium in Tel Aviv. Later, he studied history and sociology at the Hebrew University of Jerusalem. He gained a BA and worked as a teacher and sociologist. He was a visiting professor in several American academic institutes, including two years at Harvard University (1979–1980) and two terms at Trinity College in the 1990s.

As a teenager, Eliav joined the Haganah in 1936 before enlisting in the British Army in 1940 to fight in World War II. He initially served in a coastal artillery unit defending Haifa which participated in the sinking of the Italian submarine Scirè. He was transferred to the Royal Engineers in 1942 and subsequently served in Egypt and Italy. After being discharged from the British Army he became active in the Palyam and participated in Aliyah Bet operations. He served in the Israel Defense Forces during the 1948 Arab-Israeli War, initially on the Jerusalem front and then in an administrative position in the Israeli Navy. He was discharged with the rank of Colonel in 1949. He later worked as an aide to Levi Eshkol on the topics of immigration, absorption and settlement. Between 1955 and 1957 he oversaw the foundation of several settlements in Lakhish Regional Council area. During the Suez Crisis he supervised Operation Tushia, which transported the Jews of Port Said to Israel.

In 1958 he returned to Moscow, where he worked as the first secretary in the Israeli embassy, a position he held until 1960.

Eliav married Tania Zvi, a Holocaust survivor from Kaunas, Lithuania, who was part of a group of refugees Eliav smuggled into Palestine as the commander of an illegal immigration ship in 1947. They had three children, Zvi, Ofra and Eyal.

== Political career ==
Eliav was first elected to the Knesset in the 1965 elections on the Alignment list, and was appointed Deputy Minister of Trade and Industry. During the Knesset term he became Deputy Minister of Immigrant Absorption.

He retained his seat in the 1969 elections, but was not given a ministerial portfolio. He was instead appointed general secretary of the Labour Party, but resigned in 1971 over the party's refusal to recognise the existence of the Palestinian people. After again retaining his seat in the 1973 elections, he left the party, first sitting as an independent MK, before joining with the Ratz faction to form Ya'ad – Civil Rights Movement. However, the new party split up soon after its foundation, with Eliav founding a new party, the Social-Democratic Faction together with Marcia Freedman. The new party later changed its name to Independent Socialist Faction.

In the run up to the 1977 elections, he joined the Left Camp of Israel, due to his opposition to settlements in the occupied territories. The new party won only two seats, but a rotation agreement saw the seats shared by five people; Eliav served the first term, before resigning from the Knesset in January 1979 to make way for Uri Avnery. In 1984 he established a personal faction that ran in the elections that year, but failed to cross the electoral threshold by around 5,000 votes. In 1987 he returned to the Labor Party.

In 1987 he initiated and led a Jewish Agency project to found Nitzana, a new educational community, in the Negev desert. He served as the Head of Community until 2008. Eliav returned to the Knesset after the 1988 elections. He served one last Knesset term and in 1992 decided not to run for a new term.

Eliav died in Tel Aviv on 30 May 2010 at the age of 89.

== Pioneering activity ==
Eliav helped to found the city of Arad in the Negev and promoted the development of Lakhish and Kiryat Gat. In the 1980s, he was the driving spirit behind the establishment of Nitzana in the western Negev, turning the sand dunes into a youth village.

== Awards and recognition ==
- In 1988, he was awarded the Israel Prize, for special contributions to society and the State of Israel.
- In 2003, he won the Ben-Gurion Prize.

== Published works ==
Eliav published 15 books, including:

- Between Hammer and Sickle (1965)
- The Voyage of the Ulua (1967)
- New targets for Israel (1969)
- The Short Cut (1970)
- Land of the Hart (1972)
- Shalom: Peace in Jewish Tradition (1977)
- Autobiography: Rings of Dawn (1984)
- New Heart, New Spirit: Biblical Humanism for Modern Israel (1986)
- On Both Sides of the New-Comers' Camp: an Intimate Dialogue on Israeli Identity (2006) – with co-author Yossi Alfi

== See also ==
- List of Israel Prize recipients
