= Alignment (Israel) =

Political alliance (1965–1991)

Alignment המערך
- Historical leaders: Levi Eshkol (1969); Golda Meir (1969–74); Yitzhak Rabin (1974–77); Shimon Peres (1977–91)
- Founded: 1965 (first alignment); 1969 (second alignment)
- Dissolved: 1968 (first alignment); 18 July 1991 (second alignment)
- Merged into: Labor Party
- Ideology: Social democracy Labor Zionism; Factions: Democratic socialism Social liberalism
- Political position: Centre-left; Factions: Centre to left-wing
- International affiliation: Socialist International
- Member parties: Ahdut HaAvoda (1965–68); Mapai (1965–68); Labor Party (1969-91); Mapam (1969-84); Progress and Development (1974–76); Arab List for Bedouin and Villagers (1974–77); Ratz (1981–84); Yahad (1984–86); Independent Liberals (1984–88)
- Slogan: המערך, הדרך לפריצת דרך (The Alignment, the path to progress) (1988)
- Most MKs: 63 (1969)
- Fewest MKs: 31 (1977–1980)

Election symbol
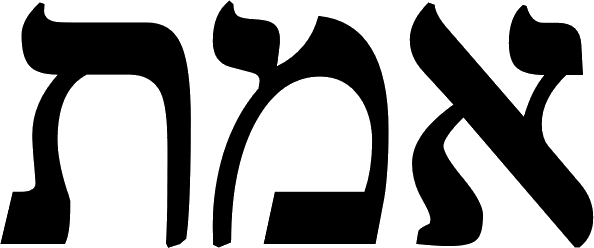

The Alignment (Hebrew: המערך, romanized: HaMa'arakh, Arabic: التجمع, romanized: Al-Tajammu) was the name of two political alliances in Israel, both of which ended their existence by merging, in January 1968 and October 1991, into the Israeli Labor Party.

The first Alignment was a 1965 alliance of Mapai and Ahdut HaAvoda. The two parties continued to exist independently, but submitted joint electoral lists. Often called the Labor Alignment, the alliance lasted three years until a merger with Rafi in 1968 created the unitary Israeli Labor Party.

The following year the Labor Party formed an alliance with Mapam, readopting the Alignment name. The two constituent parties remained separate, but with combined electoral campaigns and candidate lists. The second version of the Alignment lasted for more than two decades.

In the late 1980s, the junior partners left the Alignment's fold, and in 1991, the alliance was dissolved, allowing the Labor Party could run in its own name.

At its formation in 1969, the second Alignment had 63 of 120 Knesset seats, the only time a parliamentary group in Israel has ever held a parliamentary majority. Although its majority was lost in the 1969 election, the 56 seats won by the Alignment remains the highest seat total won in an Israeli election.

== First Alignment ==
Labor Alignment המערך לאחדות פועלי ארץ ישראל
- Historical leaders: Levi Eshkol
- Founded: 1965
- Dissolved: 1968
- Merged into: Labor Party
- Ideology: Social democracy Labor Zionism
- Political position: Centre-left
- International affiliation: Socialist International
- Member parties: Mapai; Ahdut HaAvoda

Election symbol

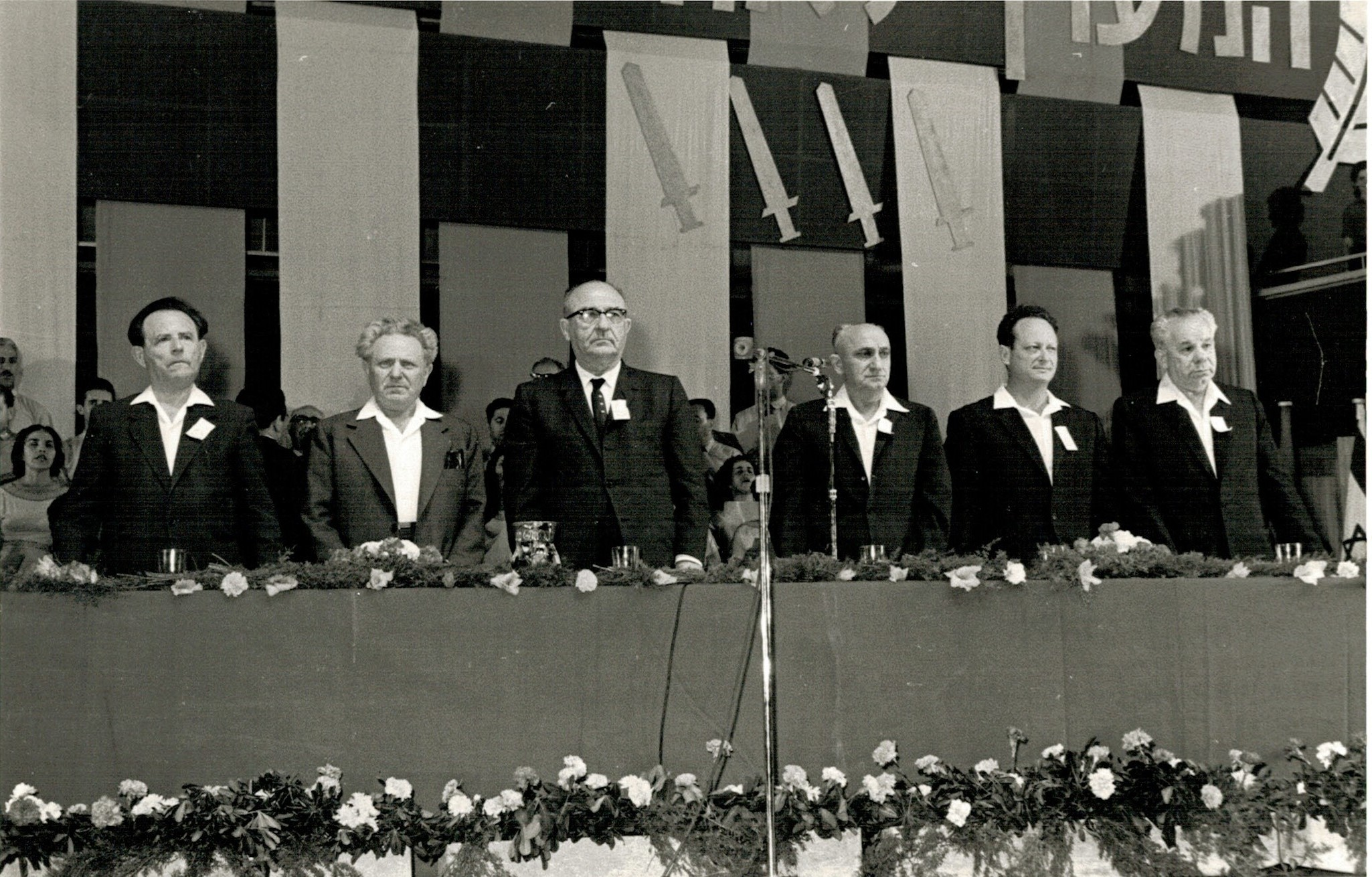
Alignment politicians at a 1965 conference. From left to right: Aharon Becker, Yisrael Galili, Levi Eshkol, Reuven Barkat, Yigal Allon and Mordechai Ish-Shalom

The first incarnation of the Alignment, fully named the HaMa'arakh LeAhdut Poalei Eretz Yisrael (Hebrew: המערך לאחדות פועלי ארץ ישראל, lit. Alignment for the Unity of the Workers of the Land of Israel), was an alliance of Mapai and Ahdut HaAvoda formed to contest the 1965 Knesset election. Its formation was in response to the incoming merger of the two major right-wing parties in Israel, Herut and the Liberal Party, to form Gahal, and to try to preserve the left's hegemony in Israeli politics.

In the election the Alignment won 36.7% of the vote and 45 of the 120 Knesset seats, enough to comfortably beat Gahal, which had only won 26, though not as many as Mapai had won in the 1951 and 1959 legislative elections. The Alignment's leader, Levi Eshkol formed a coalition government with the National Religious Party, Mapam, the Independent Liberals, Poalei Agudat Yisrael and two Israeli Arab parties associated with the Alignment; Progress and Development and Cooperation and Brotherhood.

On 23 January 1968, Mapai and Ahdut HaAvoda merged with Rafi to form the Israeli Labor Party, with the Alignment ceasing to exist. Rafi leader David Ben-Gurion refused to join the Labor Party, and left Rafi before the merger. He formed a new party, the National List.

== Second Alignment ==
First symbol of the second Alignment, utilized on campaign materials during the 1969 Israeli legislative election

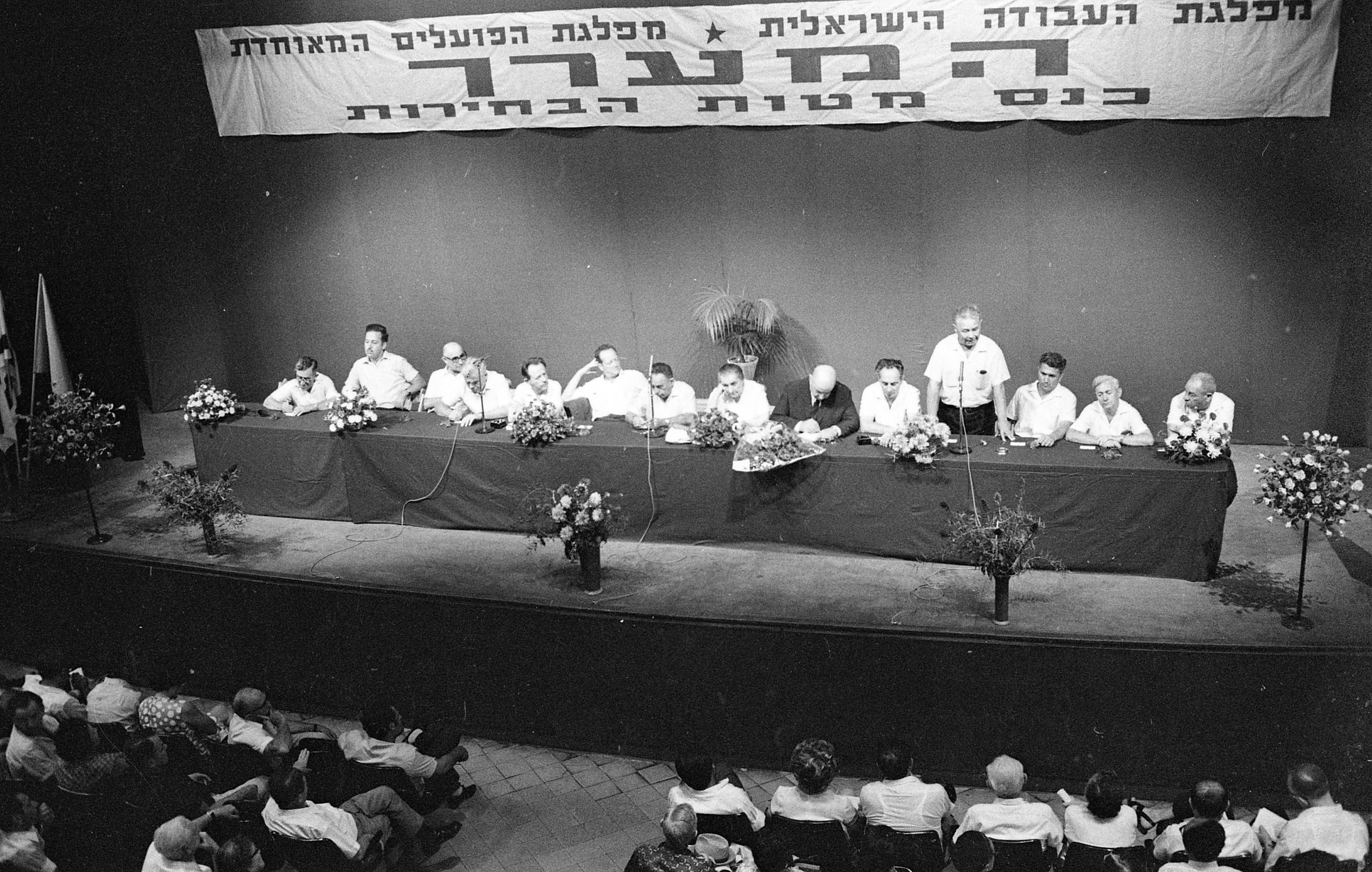
Conference of the Israeli Labour Party in 1969

The Labor Party entered into an alliance with Mapam on 28 January 1969. The Alignment name was still well-known, and was re-used for the new alliance. At the time, the Labor Party held 55 seats, and Mapam eight, giving the new Alignment a majority of 63 seats in the 120-seat Knesset, the only majority faction in Israeli history.

When Levi Eshkol died on 26 February 1969, he was succeeded by Golda Meir, Israel's first, and so far only, female Prime Minister, making Israel one of the first countries in the world to have a woman heading the government.

The country's success in the Six-Day War helped the party's popularity, and led to its comprehensive victory in the 1969 elections. Although it lost its majority, the 46.2% of the vote and 56 seats was (and remains) the best electoral performance in Israeli political history. Meir continued with a national unity government including Gahal, the National Religious Party (Mafdal), the Independent Liberals, Progress and Development and Cooperation and Brotherhood until 1970 when Gahal resigned after the government had decided in principle to adopt the Rogers Plan, though ultimately they decided against it.

During the Knesset session, the party gained one seat as Meir Avizohar defected from the National List.

=== 1970s ===
Logo used by the party in 1977

The seventh Knesset also covered the event that played a major part in the party's downfall. On 6 October 1973, as Israelis were observing Yom Kippur, a surprise attack was launched by Egypt and Syria, resulting in the Yom Kippur War. Although Israel later recovered the ground initially lost, the war was generally considered to be a failure, and the government faced significant criticism. The Agranat Commission was set up to examine the circumstances that led to the war.

Before the commission could publish its results, an election was held. Anger at the government was not significantly noticeable, as the Alignment still won 39.6% of the vote and 51 seats. More significantly, the new major right-wing party, Likud, won 39 seats, and was now breathing down the Alignment's neck. Meir formed a coalition with the National Religious Party and the Independent Liberals. However, ten days after the Agranat Commission published its findings on 1 April 1974, Meir resigned, despite the report clearing her and her Defence Minister, Moshe Dayan, of all responsibility.

Yitzhak Rabin took over the Labor Party, beating Shimon Peres in a leadership contest. This battle led to a long-term falling out between the two, after Rabin described Peres as an "indefatigable intriguer" in his autobiography. Rabin formed a new government with Ratz, the Independent Liberals, Progress and Development and the Arab List for Bedouins and Villagers, another Israeli Arab party associated with the Alignment. The National Religious Party joined the coalition soon after, though their arrival precipitated the departure of secularist Ratz.

The party's internal divisions were also beginning to show. Mapam broke away, as did Progress and Development and the Arab List for Bedouins and Villagers, who had both come under the Alignment umbrella during Rabin's tenure. Although Mapam returned to the fold shortly afterward, the two Arab parties permanently broke their ties with Alignment. Instead, they created the United Arab List. Two other MKs, Aryeh Eliav and Mordechai Ben-Porat, also left the party. Eliav went on to form Ya'ad – Civil Rights Movement and then the Independent Socialist Faction, and Ben-Porat remained an independent MK.

In 1976 the Alignment government was hit by the Yadlin affair regarding illegitimate financial transactions by senior members of the party, notably Asher Yadlin and Avraham Ofer. The following year Rabin fell victim to a double scandal, when it was revealed his wife, Leah had a foreign currency bank account, illegal in Israel at the time; the episode becoming known as the Dollar Account affair. He also took responsibility for an apparent breach of the Sabbath on an Israeli Air Force base. Rabin resigned over the former incident, and Peres took over as prime minister just a short time before the next elections.

Shortly before the election, the Alignment party suffered another major blow when Rabin announced that US President Jimmy Carter supported the Israeli idea of defensive borders. Peres led the party into the 1977 elections, which proved to be a historical turning point in Israeli political history: For the first time the left-wing were defeated. The Alignment won only 24.6% of the vote, a decrease of over a third, and picked up just 32 seats. In contrast, Menachem Begin's Likud won 43 seats. Begin was able to form a right-wing coalition with Shlomtzion (which quickly merged into Likud), the National Religious Party, Agudat Israel, and Dash. Even after Dash disintegrated, Begin still held a majority.

Although the disastrous Yom Kippur War was a factor in the party's heavy defeat, allegations of corruption and nepotism (highlighted by the various scandals) and anger at the party's perceived bias towards Ashkenazi Jews over Mizrahi Jews also played major roles in the election result.

Further embarrassment for the Alignment was brought about as Begin offered Moshe Dayan the position of Foreign Minister despite his party not being in the coalition. Dayan accepted the offer, and was expelled from the party. After sitting as an independent MK, he founded Telem.

However, the Alignment still had an important role to play, as it helped pass the Camp David Accords and the Egypt–Israel peace treaty in the Knesset. This was necessary as many Likud MKs had broken away to form opposition parties (One Israel, Rafi – National List, Tehiya and Yosef Tamir as an independent) and several others (including Ariel Sharon and Yitzhak Shamir) abstained from voting on it.

Despite losing Dayan, the party picked up two more seats as former Dash MKs Meir Amit and David Golomb defected from Shinui.

=== 1980s ===
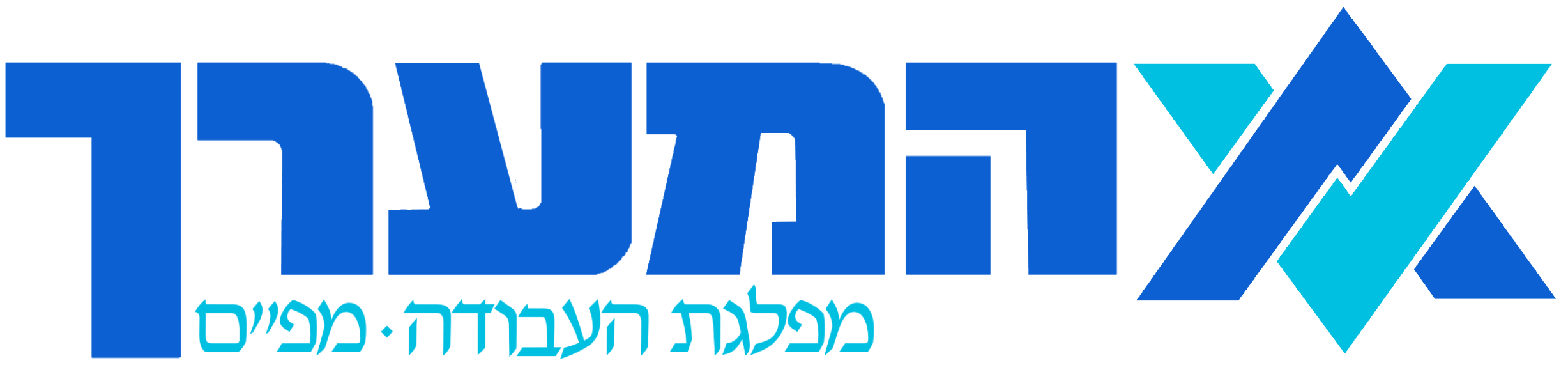
Symbol of the second Alignment, with a stylized Star of David

The party recovered well in the 1981 elections as it gained 36.6% of the vote, an improvement of 12%, and 47 seats. However, Likud took 48, allowing Begin to form the government with the help of small right-wing and religious parties. Ratz briefly merged into the Alignment, but broke away again. Nevertheless, by the end of the Knesset session the party had more seats than its rival as two Likud MKs had defected to join it. The Alignment was also boosted when the Independent Liberals joined the alliance in 1984, though they held no seats of their own at the time.

With Peres still at the head of the party, the 1984 elections resulted in stalemate. Although the Alignment won 44 seats to Likud's 41, it could not muster enough support from suitable smaller parties to form a government (the next largest party had only five seats, and two of the small left-wing parties, Hadash and the Progressive List for Peace were not viewed as potential coalition partners due to their radical left-wing views). However, the Likud found itself in the same situation (Kach being impossible to work with). The result was a grand coalition of the Alignment, Likud, the National Religious Party, Agudat Israel, Shas, Morasha, Shinui and Ometz (which later merged into Likud). With 97 seats, it was the largest coalition in Israeli political history aside from national unity governments.

Peres and new Likud leader Yitzhak Shamir agreed to share power, with Peres Prime Minister for the first two years of the Knesset term and Shamir for the last two. When Shamir took over, Shinui left the coalition. The Alignment ended the session with six less MKs, as Mapam broke away from the party, unhappy at the power-sharing agreement with Shamir. The party also lost one MK to Ratz (Yossi Sarid) and one to the newly formed Arab Democratic Party (Abdulwahab Darawshe). The Independent Liberals left to make the short lived Centre-Shinui alliance, and their sole MK, Yitzhak Artzi, defected to the Shinui faction.. However, these seats were replenished when the three-man Yahad merged into the Alignment.

Despite the Labor Party being the only remaining member, the Alignment still participated in the political scene under its own name.

The result of the 1988 elections was also ambiguous, with Likud winning 40 seats and the Alignment 39. Another power-sharing arrangement was made, and the coalition again had 97 members, consisting of Likud, the Alignment, the National Religious Party, Shas, Agudat Israel and Degel HaTorah.

However, in 1990 Peres made a bid for sole power through the creation of a narrow 61-seat coalition with the Ultra-orthodox parties Shas, Agudat Israel and Degel HaTorah and the left-wing Mapam, Ratz and Shinui. Ultimately the bid failed, and the Alignment was kicked out of the coalition for the last two years of the Knesset's term. The party also lost one MK, Efraim Gur, who left and set up Unity for Peace and Immigration before joining Likud. The affair later became known in Israel as "the dirty trick".

On 16 July 1991, the Labor Party voted to stop using the Alignment name effective from the 18th. The party's secretary-general, Michael Harish, explained that the name became useless after Mapam's departure, and that the Labor Party's own name was much more meaningful.

== Legacy ==
The Israeli Labor Party (which was already in an electoral alliance with Gesher) and Mapam's successor party, Meretz, would later form a new electoral alliance in 2020, called simply Labor-Gesher-Meretz; Labor and Meretz eventually merged into a single party called The Democrats in 2024.

The Labor Party continued to use the Alignment's electoral symbol, אמת, long after Mapam had left and dissolved. It is now the symbol of The Democrats.

The Hebrew name of the Alignment, "המערך", has never been reused, but the Arabic name "التجمع" is now used by the unrelated Balad party.

== List of chairpersons ==
- 1965–1968 – Levi Eshkol
- 1969–1974 – Golda Meir
- 1974–1977 – Yitzhak Rabin
- 1977–1991 – Shimon Peres

== Composition ==
First Alignment (1965–1968)
Name	Ideology	Position	Leader
Mapai	Labor Zionism	Centre-left	Levi Eshkol
Ahdut HaAvoda	Labor Zionism	Left-wing	Yisrael Galili

Second Alignment (1968–1991)
Years	Name	Ideology	Position	Leader(s)
1968–1991	Labor	Social democracy	Centre-left	Golda Meir; Yitzhak Rabin; Shimon Peres
1968–1984	Mapam	Democratic socialism	Left-wing	Meir Ya'ari; Yair Tzaban
1974–1977	Progress and Development; Arab List for Bedouin and Villagers	Arab satellite lists of Labor		Seif el-Din el-Zoubi; Hamad Abu Rabia
1981–1984	Ratz	Liberal socialism	Left-wing	Shulamit Aloni
1984–1986	Yahad	Centrism	Centre	Ezer Weizman
1984–1988 (Note: The Independent Liberals left the Alignment to ally with Shinui in 1988. They merged with the Labor Party on 7 October 1991, after the Alignment had been dissolved.)	Independent Liberals	Liberalism	Centre	Yitzhak Artzi

== Election results ==
Election	Votes	%	Seats	+/–	Leader	Status
1965	443,379 (#1)	36.7	45 / 120	▲3	Levi Eshkol	Government
1969	632,135 (#1)	46.2	56 / 120	▲11	Golda Meir	Government
1973	621,183 (#1)	39.6	51 / 120	▼5	Golda Meir	Government
1977	430,023 (#2)	24.6	32 / 120	▼19	Shimon Peres	Opposition
1981	708,536 (#2)	36.6	47 / 120	▲15	Shimon Peres	Opposition
1984	724,074 (#1)	34.9	44 / 120	▼3	Shimon Peres	Government
1988	685,363 (#2)	30.0	39 / 120	▼5	Shimon Peres	Government (1988–1990)
1988	685,363 (#2)	30.0	39 / 120	▼5	Shimon Peres	Opposition (1990–1991)
