= 1973 Israeli legislative election =

- 31 December 1973
- All 120 seats in the Knesset; 61 seats needed for a majority
- Turnout: 78.58% (▼3.08pp)
Party	Leader	Vote %	Seats	+/–
Alignment	Golda Meir	39.65	51	−5
Likud	Menachem Begin	30.21	39	+7
Mafdal	Yosef Burg	8.32	10	−2
Religious Torah Front	Shlomo Lorincz	3.83	5	−1
Independent Liberals	Moshe Kol	3.61	4	0
Rakah	Meir Vilner	3.41	4	+1
Ratz	Shulamit Aloni	2.24	3	New
Progress & Development	Seif el-Din el-Zoubi	1.44	2	0
Moked	Meir Pa'il	1.41	1	0
Arab List for Bedouin and Villagers	Hamad Abu Rabia	1.05	1	New
This lists parties that won seats. See the complete results below.
Prime Minister before	Prime Minister after
Golda Meir; Alignment	Golda Meir; Alignment

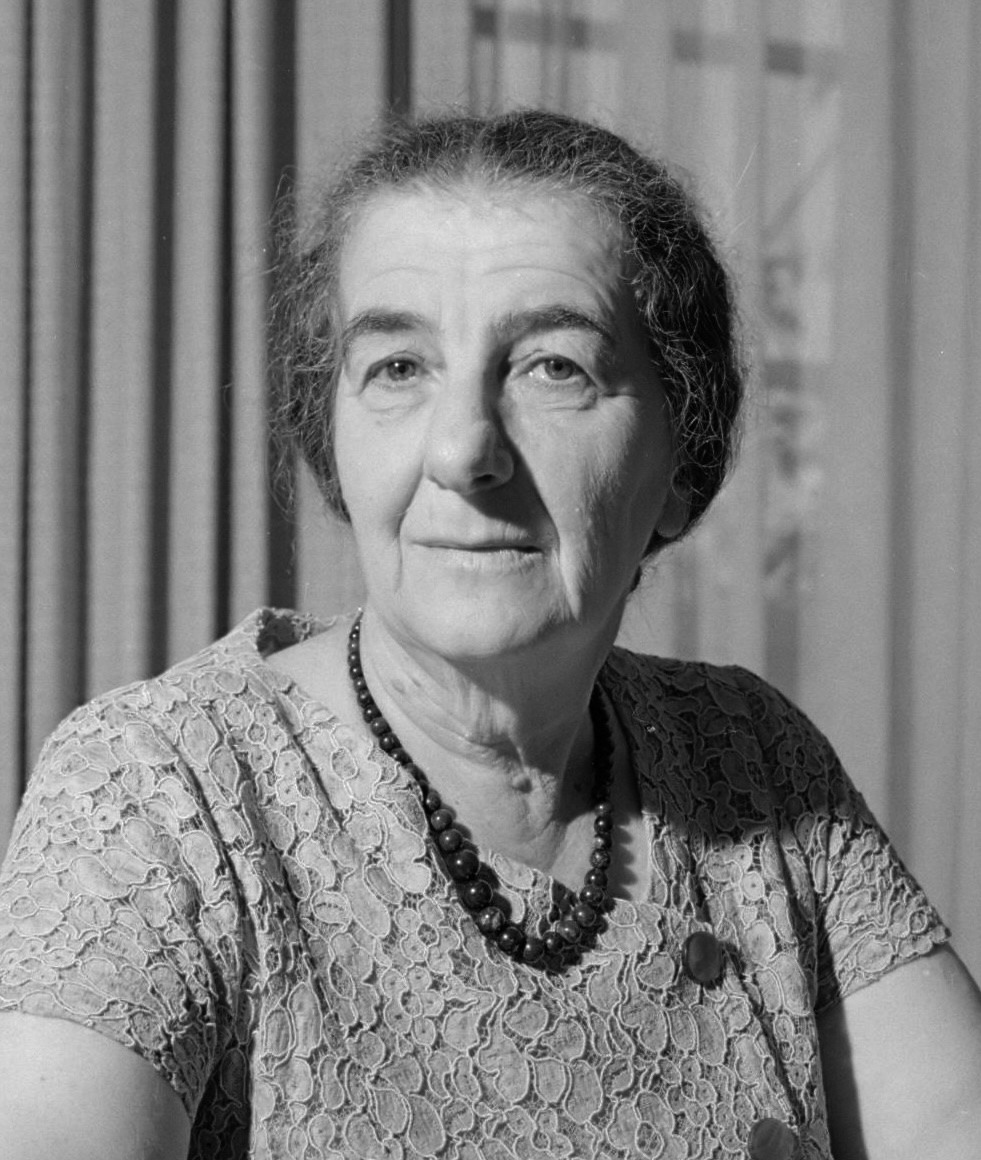
The Alignment party, led by Golda Meir, received the plurality of the votes in the 1973 elections.

Legislative elections were held in Israel on 31 December 1973. Voter turnout was 79%. The election was postponed for two months because of the Yom Kippur War.

== Parliament factions ==
The table below lists the parliamentary factions represented in the 7th Knesset.

Name	Ideology	Symbol	Leader	1969 result		Seats at 1972 dissolution
Name	Ideology	Symbol	Leader	Votes (%)	Seats	Seats at 1972 dissolution
Alignment	Social democracy Labor Zionism	אמת	Golda Meir	46.2%	56 / 120	57 / 120
Gahal	National liberalism	חל	Menachem Begin	21.7%	26 / 120	26 / 120
Mafdal	Religious Zionism	ב	Yosef Burg	9.7%	12 / 120	11 / 120
Agudat Yisrael	Religious conservatism	ג	Yehuda Meir Abramowicz	3.2%	4 / 120	4 / 120
Independent Liberals	Liberalism	לע	Moshe Kol	3.2%	4 / 120	4 / 120
National List	Social liberalism	עמ	Yigal Hurvitz	3.1%	4 / 120	3 / 120
Rakah	Communism; Socialism	ו	Meir Vilner	2.8%	3 / 120	3 / 120
Progress and Development	Arab satellite list	רא	Seif el-Din el-Zoubi	2.1%	2 / 120	2 / 120
Poalei Agudat Yisrael	Religious conservatism	ד	Kalman Kahana	1.9%	2 / 120	2 / 120
Arab List for Bedouin and Villagers	Arab satellite list	עא	Hamad Abu Rabia	1.4%	2 / 120	2 / 120
Meri	Progressivism	ש	Uri Avnery	1.2%	2 / 120	1 / 120
Free Centre	Liberalism	ט	Shmuel Tamir	1.2%	2 / 120	2 / 120
Moked (Note: Moked's sole MK, Moshe Sneh, was elected as part of Maki in 1969, which merged into Moked on 25 July 1973.)	Socialism	ק	Moshe Sneh	1.1%	1 / 120	1 / 120
Independents	-	-	-	-	-	2 / 120 (Note: Avner Shaki left Mafdal and founded the Movement for Social Equality, but did not sit as a member of the party. Shalom Cohen left Meri and ran in 1973 as leader of the Black Panthers, but did not sit as a member either.)

== Campaign ==
In July 1973, retired general Ariel Sharon, a member of the Liberal Party, facilitated a wider alliance between Gahal (of which the Liberals were a member), the National List, and the Free Centre. The National List agreed as they had been declining since the retirement of their leader, David Ben-Gurion. The Free Centre had seceded from Gahal in 1967 due to a leadership dispute between Menachem Begin and Shmuel Tamir, but the party was enticed back with three high slots on the Likud list. The Movement for Greater Israel was also admitted, eventually winning one seat.

The election was initially scheduled for 30 October. Observers had predicted it to be an easy victory for the Alignment, who could not lose more than 6 seats. Golda Meir, the Alignment leader, had planned a campaign centred around taxation, inflation and strikes.

The breakout of the Yom Kippur War, which delayed the election, was a blow to the Alignment's prestige, and shifted the campaign to focus on war and peace. Meir stated that Israel had to retain its Jewish character, even if it meant territorial compromise. The Likud rejected compromise, and attacked the Alignment for their poor preparation, and for ceasing hostilities before 'complete victory' was attained.

Many changes happened on the left. Shalom Cohen left Meri to join the Black Panthers. However, they suffered a split when Eddie Malka formed the Blue-White Panthers, which had more financial resources. Neither of the two lists received enough votes for a seat, but would have won one if they had stayed together. After having been rejected from the Alignment list twice, Shulamit Aloni was convinced by her friends and family to submit her own list, for a new party, the Movement for Civil Rights (Ratz), which she submitted 30 minutes before the application deadline. Aloni was still a Labor member when she did this, and was expelled.

=== Opinion polls ===
A poll conducted by the Institute for Social Research poll from the 17th to 18th of December indicated 50% of Jewish voters would vote for the Alignment, 29% for the Likud, 5% for Mafdal, 4% for Ratz, 3% for the Independent Liberals, 2% for the Religious Torah Front, 2% for Moked and 1% for the Black Panthers.

== Results ==
Party	Votes	%	Seats	+/–
Alignment	621,183	39.65	51	−5
Likud	473,309	30.21	39	+7
National Religious Party	130,349	8.32	10	−2
Religious Torah Front	60,012	3.83	5	−1
Independent Liberals	56,560	3.61	4	0
Rakah	53,353	3.41	4	+1
Ratz	35,023	2.24	3	New
Progress and Development	22,604	1.44	2	0
Moked	22,147	1.41	1	0
Arab List for Bedouin and Villagers	16,408	1.05	1	New
Black Panthers	13,332	0.85	0	New
The League List	12,811	0.82	0	New
Meri	10,469	0.67	0	−1
Movement for Social Equality	10,202	0.65	0	New
Cooperation and Brotherhood	9,949	0.63	0	−2
Blue White Panthers	5,945	0.38	0	New
Brotherhood Movement	4,433	0.28	0	New
Israeli Arab List	3,269	0.21	0	New
Yemenite List	3,195	0.20	0	New
Socialist Revolution List	1,201	0.08	0	New
Popular Movement	1,101	0.07	0	New
Total	1,566,855	100.00	120	0
Valid votes	1,566,855	97.86		
Invalid/blank votes	34,243	2.14		
Total votes	1,601,098	100.00		
Registered voters/turnout	2,037,478	78.58		
Source: IDI, Nohlen et al.

== Aftermath ==
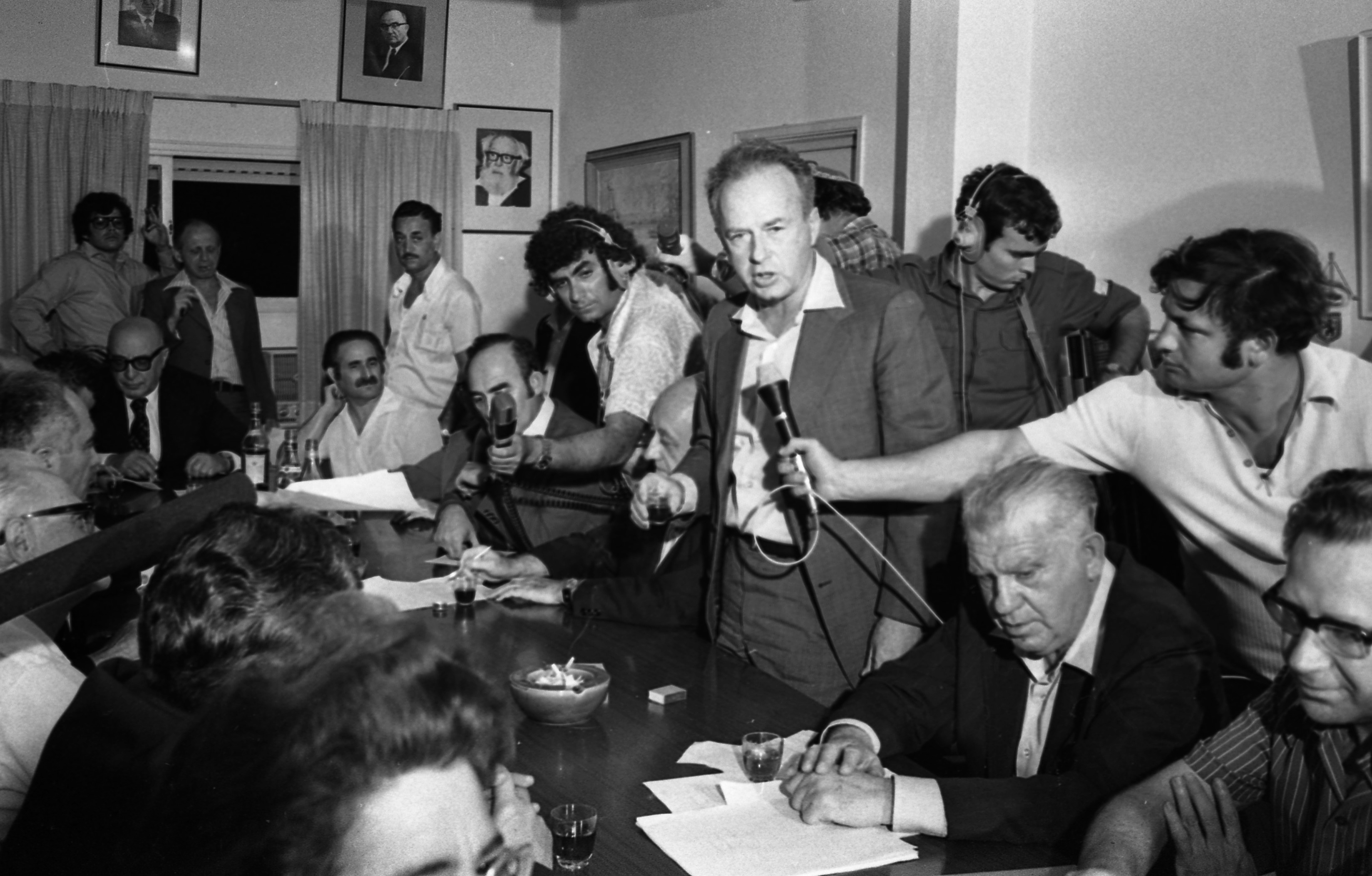
Signing the agreement that would see Yitzhak Rabin elected prime minister

Golda Meir of the Alignment formed the sixteenth government on 10 March 1974, including the National Religious Party and the Independent Liberals in her coalition, with 22 ministers. Meir resigned on 11 April 1974 after the Agranat Commission had published its interim report on the Yom Kippur War.

The Alignment's Yitzhak Rabin formed the seventeenth government on 3 June 1974, including Ratz, the Independent Liberals, Progress and Development and the Arab List for Bedouins and Villagers. The new government had 19 ministers. The National Religious Party joined the coalition on 30 October and Ratz left on 6 November, by which time there were 21 ministers.

The government resigned on 21 December 1976, after ministers of the National Religious Party were sacked because the party had abstained from voting on a motion of no confidence, which had been brought by Agudat Yisrael over a breach of the Sabbath on an Israeli Air Force base.

During the Knesset term there were several defections from parties; In 1975 Aryeh Eliav left the Alignment and merged with Ratz to form Ya'ad - Civil Rights Movement. The new party broke up the following year when Eliav and Marcia Freedman left to set up the Independent Socialist Faction, whilst Shulamit Aloni and Boaz Moav returned to Ratz. In 1975 Benjamin Halevi left Likud to sit as an independent, whilst Shmuel Tamir and Akiva Nof left Likud to form the Free Centre the following year. In 1977 Hillel Seidel defected from the Independent Liberals to Likud, whilst Mordechai Ben-Porat broke away from the Alignment and sat as an independent.

In February 1974 Progress and Development and the Arab List for Bedouins and Villagers merged into the Alignment (with which they were already associated), but both later broke away and then formed the United Arab List in 1977. In the build-up to the 1977 elections the Religious Torah Front broke up into Agudat Yisrael (three seats) and Poalei Agudat Yisrael in March 1977. On 10 April Mapam broke away from the Alignment, but rejoined it two days later.
