= List of Arab citizens of Israel =

This is a list of notable Israeli Arab citizens.

== Academia ==
- Ghazi Falah, geography professor
- Toufik Mansour, mathematician and professor at Haifa University in the field of combinatorics.
- Rami Zeedan, author, political scientist, and historian

== Journalism ==
- Lucy Aharish, Journalist and actrees
- Yoseph Haddad, journalist and social media influencer
- Rafik Halabi, journalist and politician
- Suleiman Maswadeh, chief political correspondent for Israeli Public Broadcasting Corporation
- Ayman Sikseck, author and journalist

== Culture ==
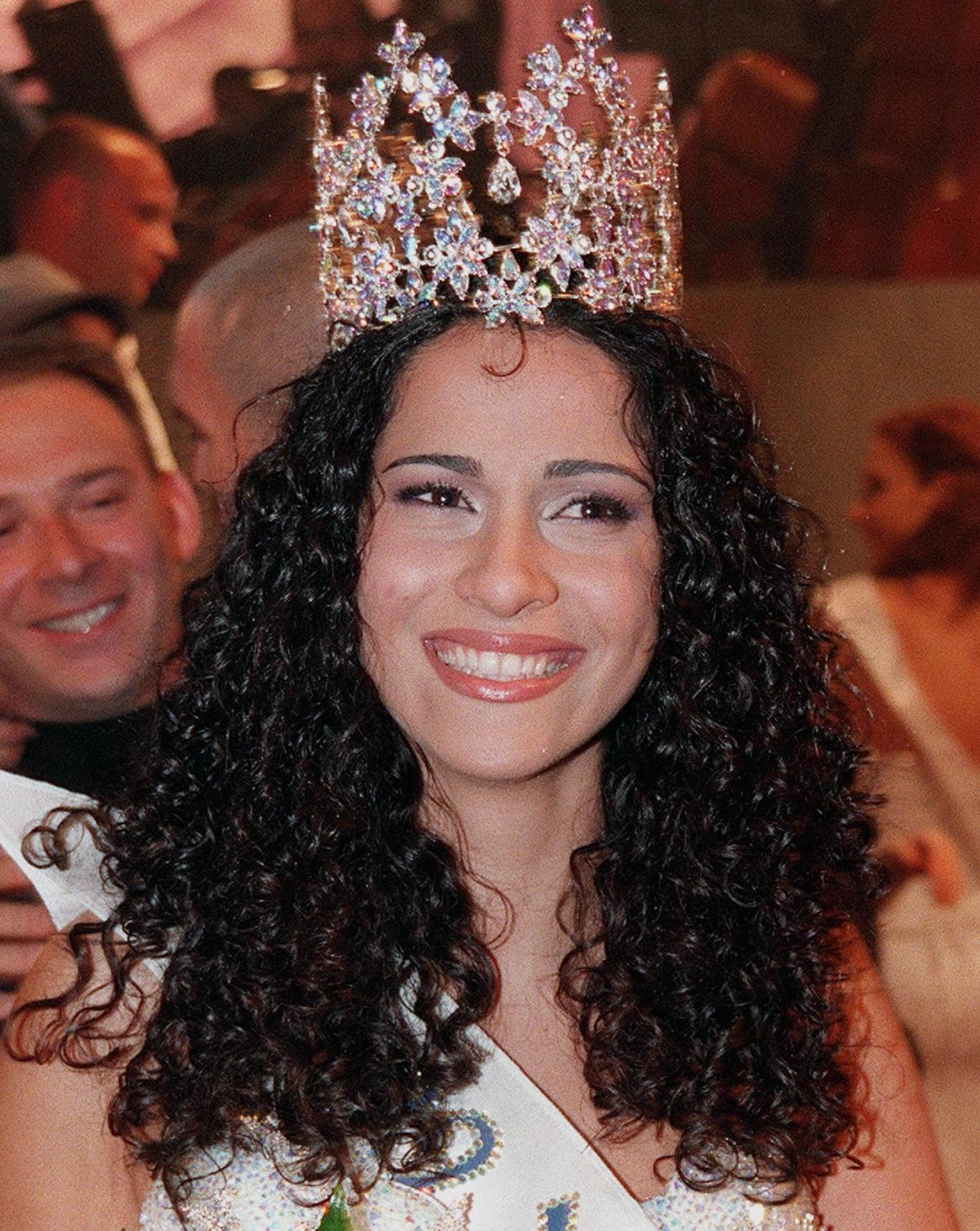
Rana Raslan, Miss Israel

- Hiam Abbass, actress and film director
- Talleen Abu Hanna, Miss Trans Israel
- Mira Awad, singer-songwriter, represented Israel at Eurovision Song Contest
- Lucy Ayoub, television presenter (mother was born Jewish, converted to Christianity)
- Mohammad Bakri, actor and film director
- Nas Daily, vlogger
- Salim Daw, actor
- Elham Dwairy Tabry, author
- Angelina Fares, beauty pageant contestant; finalist in Miss Israel 2007.
- Emile Habibi, writer of literature
- Rashid Hussein, poet, orator, journalist and Arabic-Hebrew translator
- Norman Issa, actor
- Hanna Jubran, sculptor
- Nasrin Kadri, singer (converted to Judaism as an adult)
- Ahmad Kanaan, painter and sculptor
- Sayed Kashua, author and journalist
- Clara Khoury, actress
- Reda Mansour, poet, historian, and Israeli Ambassador to Ecuador, Brazil, and Panama
- Salman Masalha, poet, writer, essayist and translator
- Salman Natour, writer, journalist, and playwright
- Samih al-Qasim, poet
- Rana Raslan, Miss Israel 1999
- Samira Saraya, actor, filmmaker, and rapper
- Anton Shammas, poet and translator
- Fatma Shanan, painter

== Elected office ==
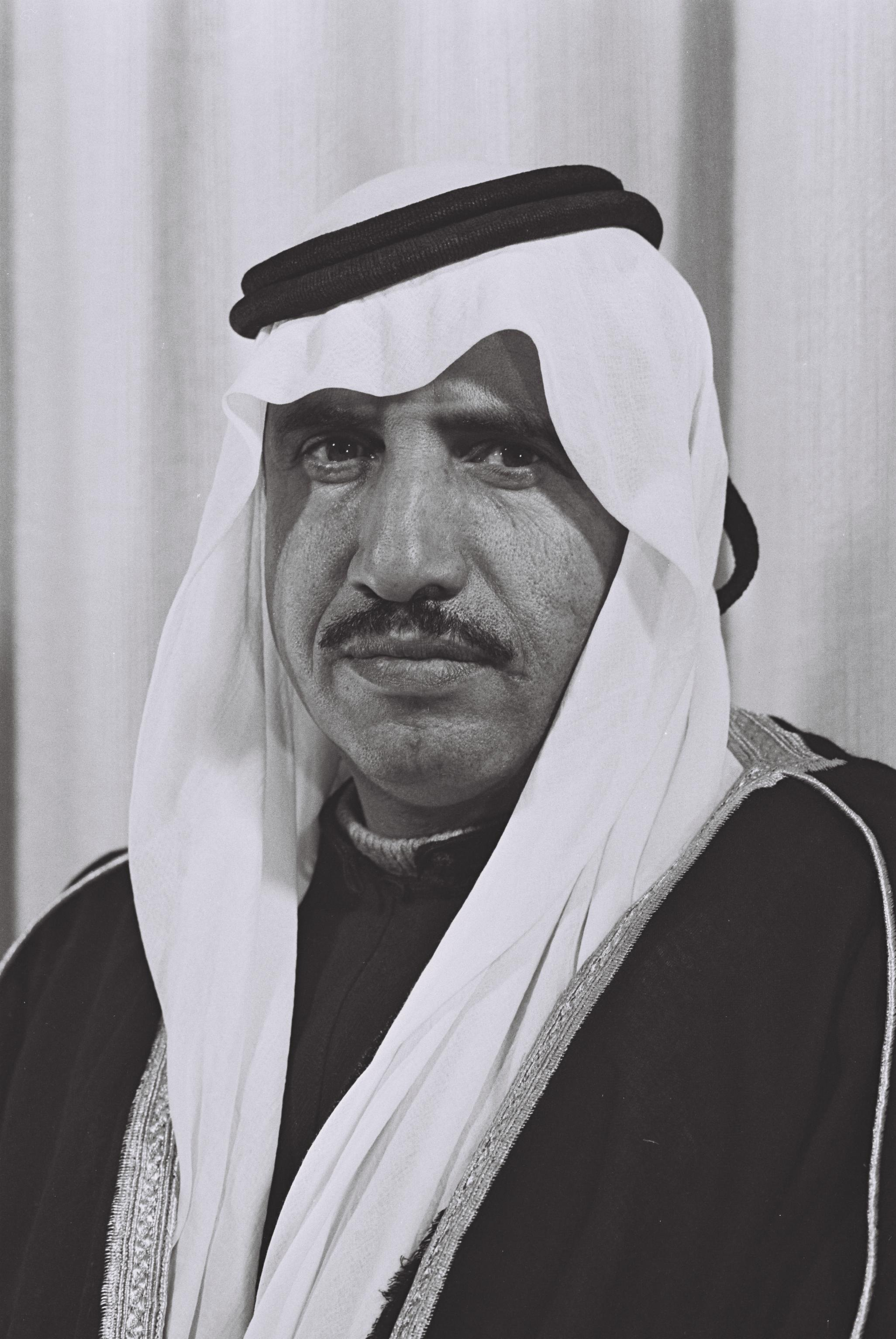
Hamad Abu Rabia

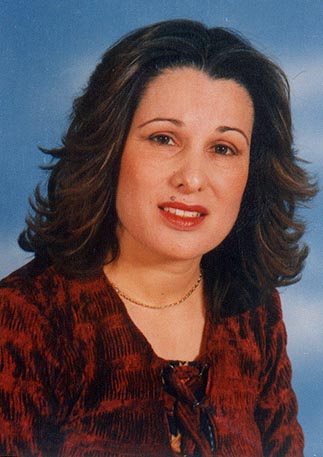
Hussniya Jabara

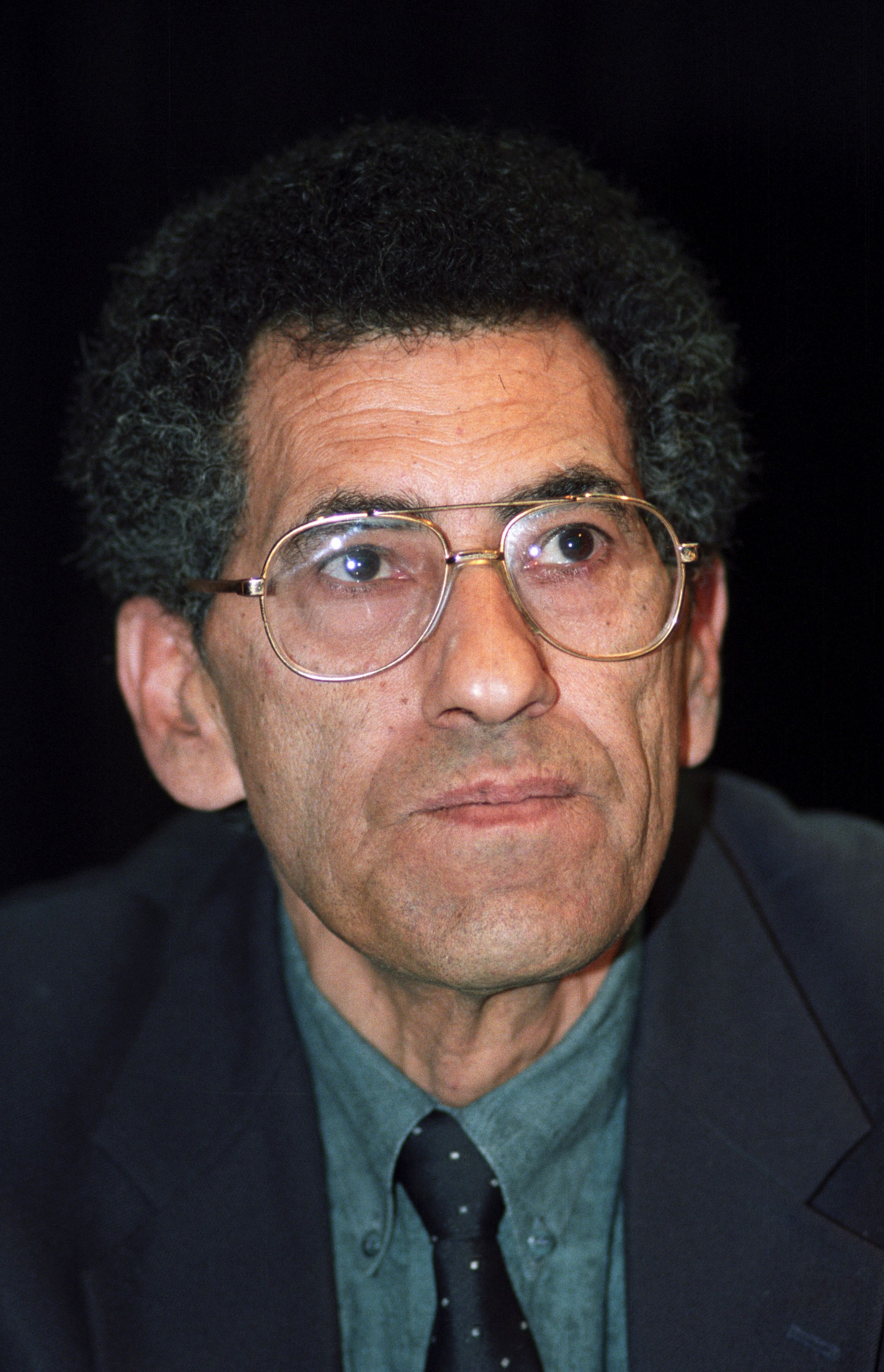
Nawaf Massalha

- Mansour Abbas, Knesset member for United Arab List party
- Hamad Abu Rabia, Knesset member for United Arab List
- Waleed Alhwashla, Knesset member for United Arab List
- Sarhan Bader, political activist
- Zouheir Bahloul, Knesset member for Zionist Union
- Mohammad Barakeh, Knesset member for Hadash party
- Azmi Bishara, Knesset member for Balad party
- Amal Nasser el-Din, Knesset member for Likud; awarded the Israel Prize, the Prime Minister's Prize for the Commemoration of Fallen Soldiers, and the Yakir Haifa Award
- Masud Ghnaim, Knesset member for United Arab List
- Mazen Ghnaim, Knesset member for United Arab List
- Yasir Hujeirat, Knesset member for United Arab List
- Hussniya Jabara, female Knesset member for Meretz party
- Ayoob Kara, Knesset member for Likud, Israeli Minister of Communications, Israeli Deputy Minister for Development of the Negev and Galilee
- Raleb Majadele, Knesset member for the Israeli Labor Party, Israeli Minister of Science, Technology and Space
- Issam Makhoul, Knesset member for Hadash
- Nawaf Massalha, Knesset member for Labor Party, Israeli Deputy Minister of Health
- Mohammed Miari, Knesset member for Progressive List for Peace party
- Gadeer Mreeh, female Knesset member for Blue and White party
- Fateen Mulla, Knesset member for Likud; Deputy Minister in the Prime Minister's Office
- Muhammad Al-Nabari, Mayor of Hura
- Ayman Odeh, Knesset member for Hadash
- Raed Salah, Mayor of Umm al-Falm
- Ibrahim Sarsur, Knesset member for United Arab List
- Hana Sweid, Knesset member for Hadash
- Wasil Taha, Knesset member for Balad
- Salah Tarif, Knesset member for Labor Party, Israeli Minister without Portfolio
- Ahmad Tibi, Knesset member for Ta'al party
- Rifaat Turk, Deputy Mayor of Tel Aviv
- Majalli Wahabi, Knesset member for Likud, Kadima, and Hatnuah; briefly assumed the position of President of Israel due to President Moshe Katzav's leave of absence and Acting President Dalia Itzik's trip abroad in February 2007.
- Jamal Zahalka, Knesset member for Balad
- Tawfiq Ziad, Knesset member for Hadash and Mayor of Nazareth

== Law ==
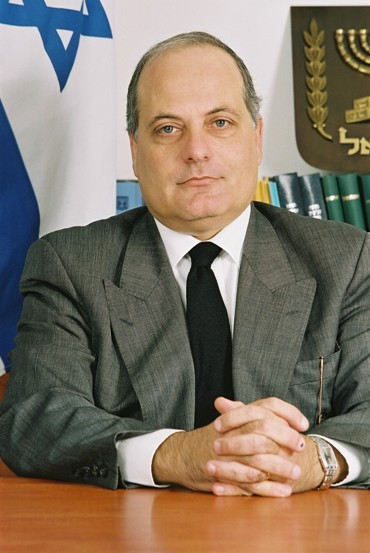
Israeli Supreme Court Justice George Karra

- Salim Joubran, Israeli Supreme Court justice from 2004 to 2017
- Khaled Kabub, Israeli Supreme Court justice from 2022 to present
- George Karra, Israeli Supreme Court justice from 2017 to 2022, presiding judge finding Israeli President Moshe Katsav guilty of rape
- Elias Khoury, lawyer
- Abdel Rahman Zuabi, former Israeli Supreme Court justice, became first Arab-Israeli Supreme Court Justice in 1999

== Military ==
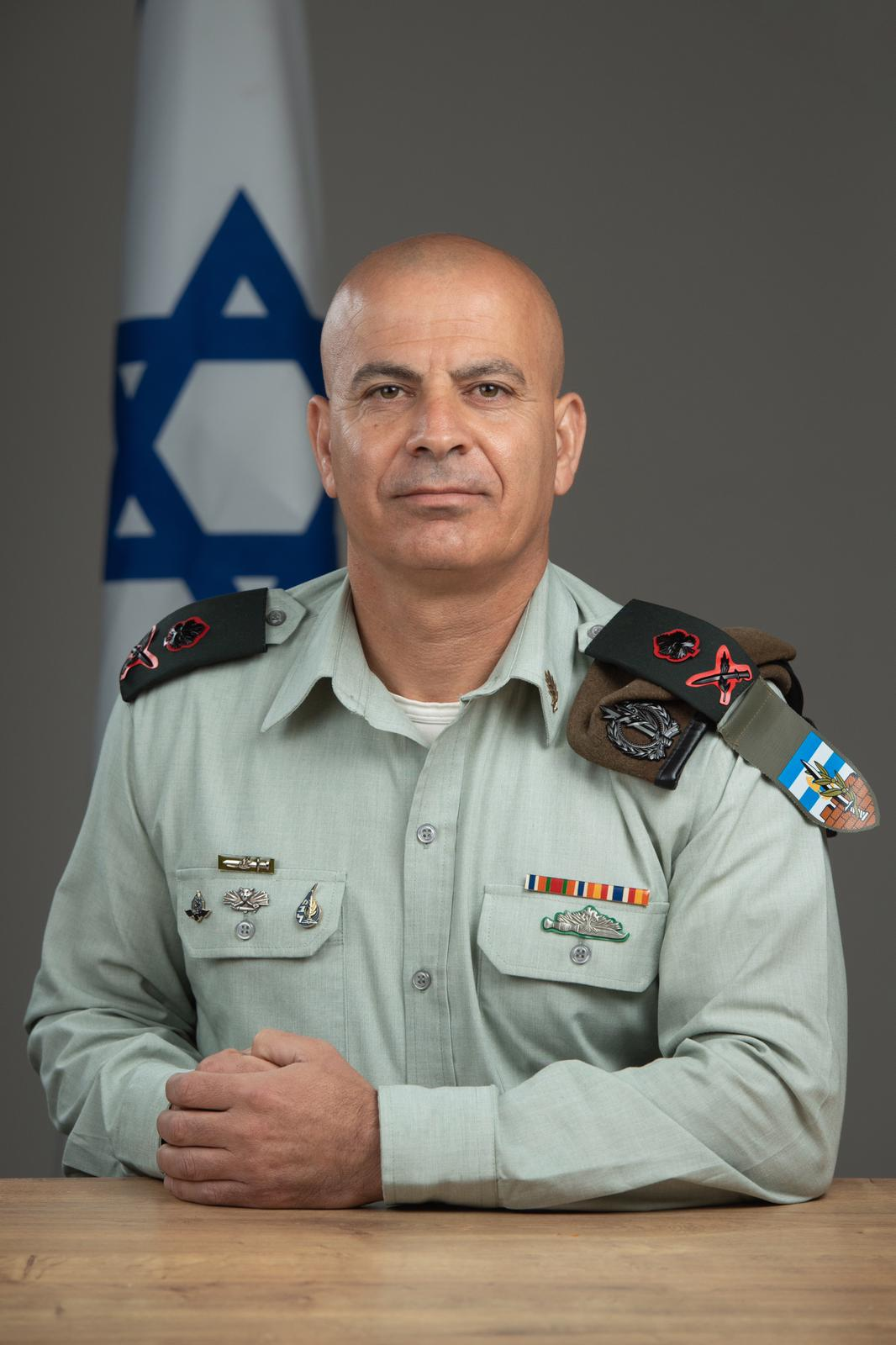
IDF Major General Ghassan Alian

- Ghassan Alian, IDF Major General, first non-Jewish commander of the Golani Brigade.
- Captain Ella, senior office in the Arabic division of the IDF spokesperson
- Imad Fares, IDF brigadier general, commander of the Givati Brigade
- Mahmoud Kheir el-Din, a Lieutenant colonel who died in the line of duty in 2018 in an operation in Khan Yunis
- Yusef Mishleb, IDF general, commander of the Etzion Regional Brigade, commander of the Edom Division, Coordinator of Government Activities in the Territories, and commander of the Home Front Command
- Amos Yarkoni (Abd el-Majid Hidr), IDF lieutenant colonel
- Salman Zarka, IDF colonel, physician, Director of Ziv Medical Center in Safed, senior lecturer at the Haifa University and the Hebrew University of Jerusalem

== Public service ==
- Naim Araidi, academic, writer, and Israeli Ambassador to Norway
- Ishmael Khaldi, Israeli deputy consul in San Francisco
- Reda Mansour, poet, historian, and diplomat, Israeli Ambassador to Ecuador, Brazil, and Panama
- Ali Yahya, former Israeli ambassador to Finland

== Sports ==
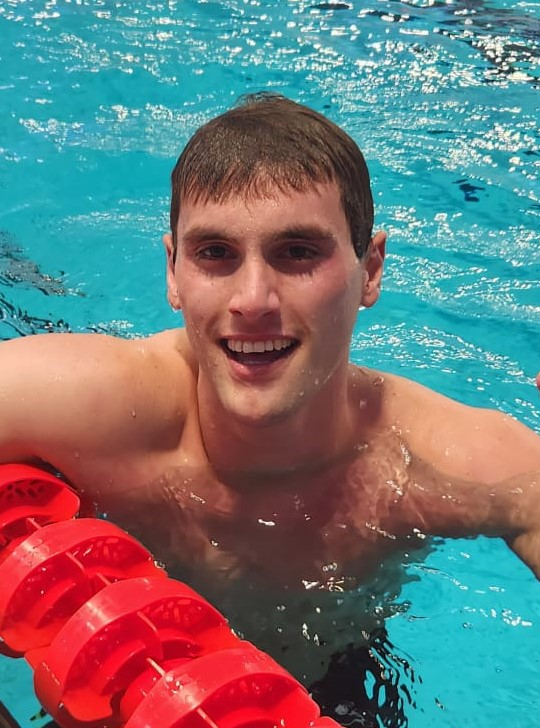
Adam Maraana

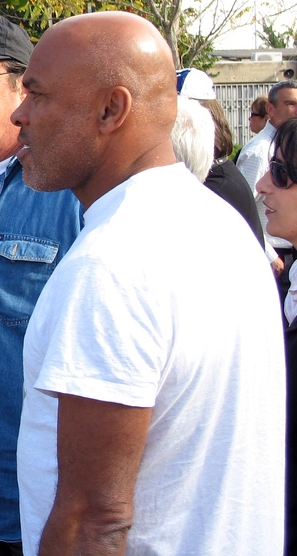
Team Israel Olympian Rifaat Turk

- Mohamed Abu Arisha (born 1997) - professional and Team Israel basketball player
- Zahi Armeli (born 1957) - Team Israel footballer
- Marian Awad (born 1996) - Team Israel footballer
- Ahad Azam (born 1992) – professional and junior Team Israel footballer
- Walid Badir (born 1974) - professional and Team Israel footballer
- Mu'nas Dabbur (born 1992) - professional and Team Israel footballer
- Hatem Abd Elhamed (born 1991) - professional and Team Israel footballer
- Sari Falah (born 1991) – professional and junior Team Israel footballer, bronze medalist in the 2009 Maccabiah Games
- Mohammad Ghadir (born 1991) - Team Israel footballer
- Marc Hinawi (born 1997) - Team Israel swimmer, European Youth Olympic champion
- Beram Kayal (born 1988) - professional and Team Israel footballer
- Shareef Keouf (born 2001) – professional and junior Team Israel footballer
- Nazar Mahmud (born 1988) – figure skater
- Adam Maraana (born 2003) - Team Israel Olympic swimmer
- Eduard Meron (born 1938) - Israeli Olympic weightlifter
- Azmi Nassar - football manager
- Elham Mahamid Ruzin (born 1990) - Team Israel Paralympic goalball player
- Dia Saba (born 1992) - professional and Team Israel footballer
- Kenny Saief (born 1993) – Team Israel footballer
- Ranin Salameh (born 1996) - Team Israel footballer
- Saleh Shahin (born 1982) - Team Israel Paralympic medalist rower
- Iyad Shalabi (born 1987) - Team Israel Paralympic champion swimmer
- Nora Shanab (born 1987) - Team Israel footballer
- Abbas Suan (born 1976) - professional and Team Israel footballer
- Salim Tuama (born 1979) - professional and Team Israel footballer
- Rifaat Turk (born 1954) - Team Israel Olympic footballer

== See also ==
- List of Israeli Arab Muslims
- List of Israeli Arab Christians
- List of Israeli Druze
