= List of Israeli Arab Christians =

Lists of Israelis

By ethnicity
Israeli Jews:
Ethiopian Jews

Arab citizens of Israel:
Arab Muslims, Druze, Arab Christians

Various:
Circassians
By descent
Afghan, Algerian, American, Argentine, Armenian, Australian, Austrian

Belarusian, Belgian, Bosnian, Brazilian, British, Bulgarian

Canadian, Chilean, Chinese, Croatian, Czech

Danish, Dutch

Egyptian, Estonian, Ethiopian

Finnish, French

Georgian, German, Greek, Guatemalan

Hungarian

Indian, Iranian, Iraqi, Irish, Italian

Kazakhstani

Latvian, Libyan, Lithuanian

Mexican, Moldovan, Moroccan, Nigerian

Polish

Romanian, Russian

Serbian, Slovak, South African, Sudanese, Swedish, Swiss, Syrian

Tunisian, Turkish

Ukrainian, Uzbekistani

Yemeni
By place of residence

This is a list of notable Arab-Israeli Christians (also known as Palestinian-Israeli Christians).

The list is ordered by category of human endeavor. Persons with significant contributions in two fields are listed in both of the pertinent categories, to facilitate easy lookup.

== Religious figures ==
- Father Gabriel Naddaf - Greek Orthodox Church – priest and judge in religious courts. Spokesman for the Greek Orthodox Patriarchate of Jerusalem.
- Munib Younan – elected president of the Lutheran World Federation since 2010 and the Evangelical Lutheran Church Bishop of Palestine and Jordan since 1998.
- Archbishop Theodosios (Hanna) of Sebastia — Bishop of the Orthodox Patriarchate of Jerusalem.
- Elias Chacour – Archbishop of Akko, Haifa, Nazareth and Galilee of the Melkite Eastern Catholic Church.
- Riah Hanna Abu El-Assal – former Anglican Bishop in Jerusalem.

== Activists ==
- Father Gabriel Naddaf - Greek Orthodox priest dedicated to integrating the Christian Arab community within Israel into Israeli society via service in military and national social service.
- Ameer Makhoul – a writer and public figure, the executive director of Palestinian network of non-governmental organizations Ittijah and the head of the High Follow-Up Committee for Arab Citizens of Israel.
- Sabri Jiryis – writer and lawyer, a graduate of the Hebrew University law faculty, and prominent Palestinian activist.

== Cultural figures ==
=== Film, TV, and stage ===
- Talleen Abu Hanna – beauty pageant winner and television personality
- Valerie Hamaty – singer and actress
- Clara Khoury – actress.
- Makram Khoury – the youngest artist and the first Arab to win the Israel Prize, the highest civic honor in Israel. He is one of the most accomplished and well-known Israeli Arab actors.
- Lina Makoul – singer
- Amal Murkus – actress and singer.
- Nasri - singer.
- Elia Suleiman – film maker and actor.
- Yousef (Joe) Sweid – actor, dancer and puppeteer.
- Hisham Zreiq – award-winning Independent film maker, poet and visual artist.

=== Popular musicians ===
- Rim Banna – singer, composer, and arranger who is well known for her modern interpretations of traditional Palestinian Arab folk songs.

=== Writers ===
- Emile Habibi – writer of Arabic expression, leader of the Israel Communist Party and Member of the Israeli Knesset.
- Anton Shammas – writer, poet, translator and editor.
- Daud Turki – poet, was the leader of the Israeli Jewish-Arab left-wing organization Revolutionary Communist alliance.
- Anton Shammas – essayist, writer of fiction and poetry and translator.
- Hisham Zreiq – award-winning Independent film maker, poet and visual artist.
- Sabri Jiryis – writer and lawyer, graduate of the Hebrew University law faculty, and prominent Palestinian activist.

== Military ==
- Elinor Joseph – soldier who has served with the Caracal Battalion of the Israel Defense Forces since 2010. She is the first Arab woman ever to serve in a combat role in the Israeli army.

== Politicians and government officials ==
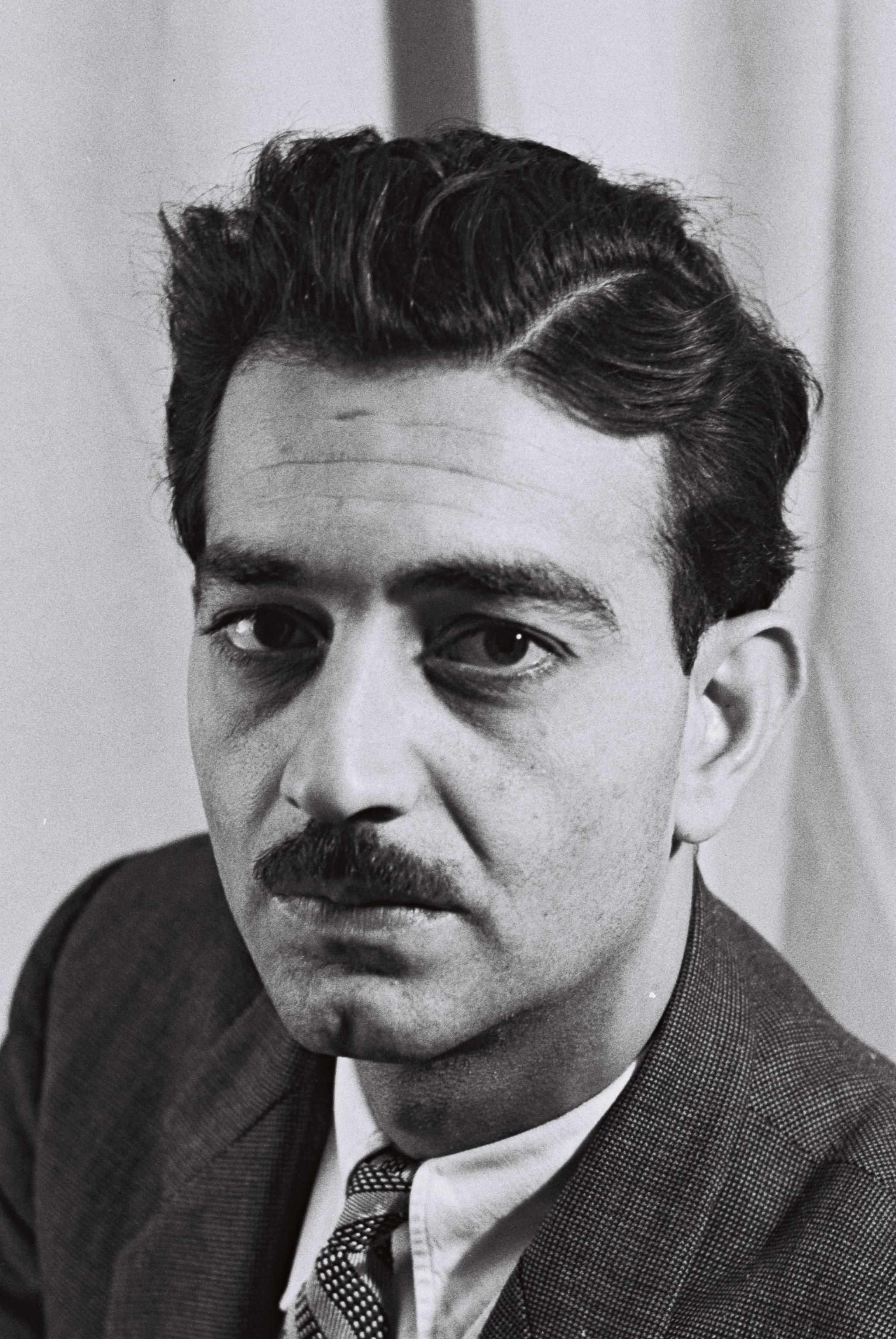
Emile Habibi

- Tawfik Toubi - was an Israeli Arab communist politician.
- Emile Habibi – writer of Arabic expression, leader of the Israel Communist Party and Member of the Israeli Knesset.
- Azmi Bishara – former member of the Knesset who left Israel after being suspected of spying for Hezbollah during the Second Lebanon War.
- Nadia Hilou – politician, who served as a member of the Knesset for the Labor Party between 2006 and 2009. She was the second female Israeli Arab MK after Hussniya Jabara, and also the first female Christian MK.
- Daud Turki – poet and the leader of the Israeli Jewish-Arab left-wing organization Revolutionary Communist alliance.
- Salim Joubran – Justice on the Supreme Court.
- George Karra - Justice on the Supreme Court.
- Hana Sweid – Member of the Knesset for Hadash.

== Criminals ==
- Elias Abuelazam – suspect of racial. serial killing and multiple stabbings.

== Miscellaneous ==
- Elias Khoury – lawyer specializing in real property law who gained fame in the 1970s when he led a legal battle against the Israeli settlers of Sebastia and Elon Moreh.

== Medicine ==
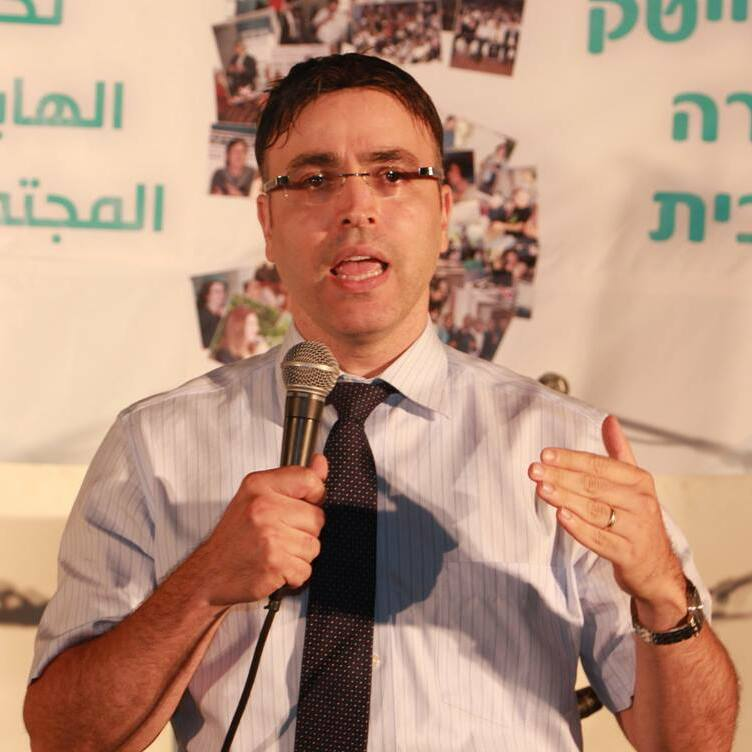
Hossam Haick

- Amal Bishara - an Israeli Arab doctor, and the director of Bone Marrow Registry Outreach, Hadassah Medical Center, which is associated with the Hebrew University of Jerusalem in Israel.
- Hossam Haick - a senior lecturer in chemical engineering and nanotechnology at the Technion-Israel Institute of Technology already has several patents in his pocket. Last year he was included as one of the world's 35 "most-promising young scientists" in the Massachusetts Institute of Technology's.
- Yaqub Hanna - an Israeli Arab who is a postdoctoral fellow at MIT, earned his Ph.D. and M.D. from Hebrew University of Jerusalem. He specializes in the study of embryonic stem cells.

== High tech ==
- Johny Srouji a Senior Vice President of Hardware Technologies at Apple Inc.

== Sports ==
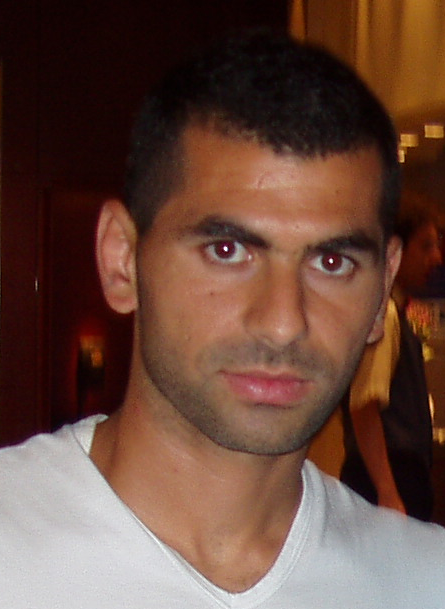
Salim Tuama

- Azmi Nassar – football manager and served as manager of the Palestinian national football team.
- Joel Abu Hanna - German-born Israeli professional footballer who plays as a centre-back for Legia Warsaw and the Israel national team.
- Karam Mashour - professional basketball player for Hapoel Galil Elyon of the Israeli Premier League.
- Marc Hinawi – swimmer.
- Maroun Gantous - association football player.
- Salim Tuama – soccer player playing for Hapoel Tel Aviv who has in the past played for Standard Liège, Maccabi Petah Tikva, Kayserispor, AEL and the youth club Gadna Tel Aviv Yehuda.

== See also ==
- Israelis
- List of notable Israelis
- List of Israeli Arab Muslims
- List of Arab citizens of Israel
- Arab Christians
- Arab citizens of Israel
