= List of Israeli Arab Muslims =

Lists of Israelis

By ethnicity
Israeli Jews:
Ethiopian Jews

Arab citizens of Israel:
Arab Muslims, Druze, Arab Christians

Various:
Circassians
By descent
Afghan, Algerian, American, Argentine, Armenian, Australian, Austrian

Belarusian, Belgian, Bosnian, Brazilian, British, Bulgarian

Canadian, Chilean, Chinese, Croatian, Czech

Danish, Dutch

Egyptian, Estonian, Ethiopian

Finnish, French

Georgian, German, Greek, Guatemalan

Hungarian

Indian, Iranian, Iraqi, Irish, Italian

Kazakhstani

Latvian, Libyan, Lithuanian

Mexican, Moldovan, Moroccan, Nigerian

Polish

Romanian, Russian

Serbian, Slovak, South African, Sudanese, Swedish, Swiss, Syrian

Tunisian, Turkish

Ukrainian, Uzbekistani

Yemeni
By place of residence

This is a list of notable Arab-Israeli Muslims.

The list is ordered by category of human endeavor. Persons with significant contributions in two fields are listed in both of the pertinent categories, to facilitate easy lookup.

== Religious figures ==
- Abdullah Nimar Darwish – founder of the Islamic Movement in Israel
- Raed Salah – leader of the northern branch of the Islamic Movement in Israel

== Cultural figures ==
=== Film, TV, and stage ===
- Hiam Abbass – actress

=== Writers ===
- Khaled Abu Toameh – journalist

=== Models ===
- Rana Raslan – fashion model who was Miss Israel in 1999. She was the first, and so far the only, Arab Israeli to win this title.

== Military ==
- Amira al Hayb – first female Bedouin soldier in a combat position
- Amos Yarkoni – Bedouin-Israeli military officer

== Politicians and government officials ==
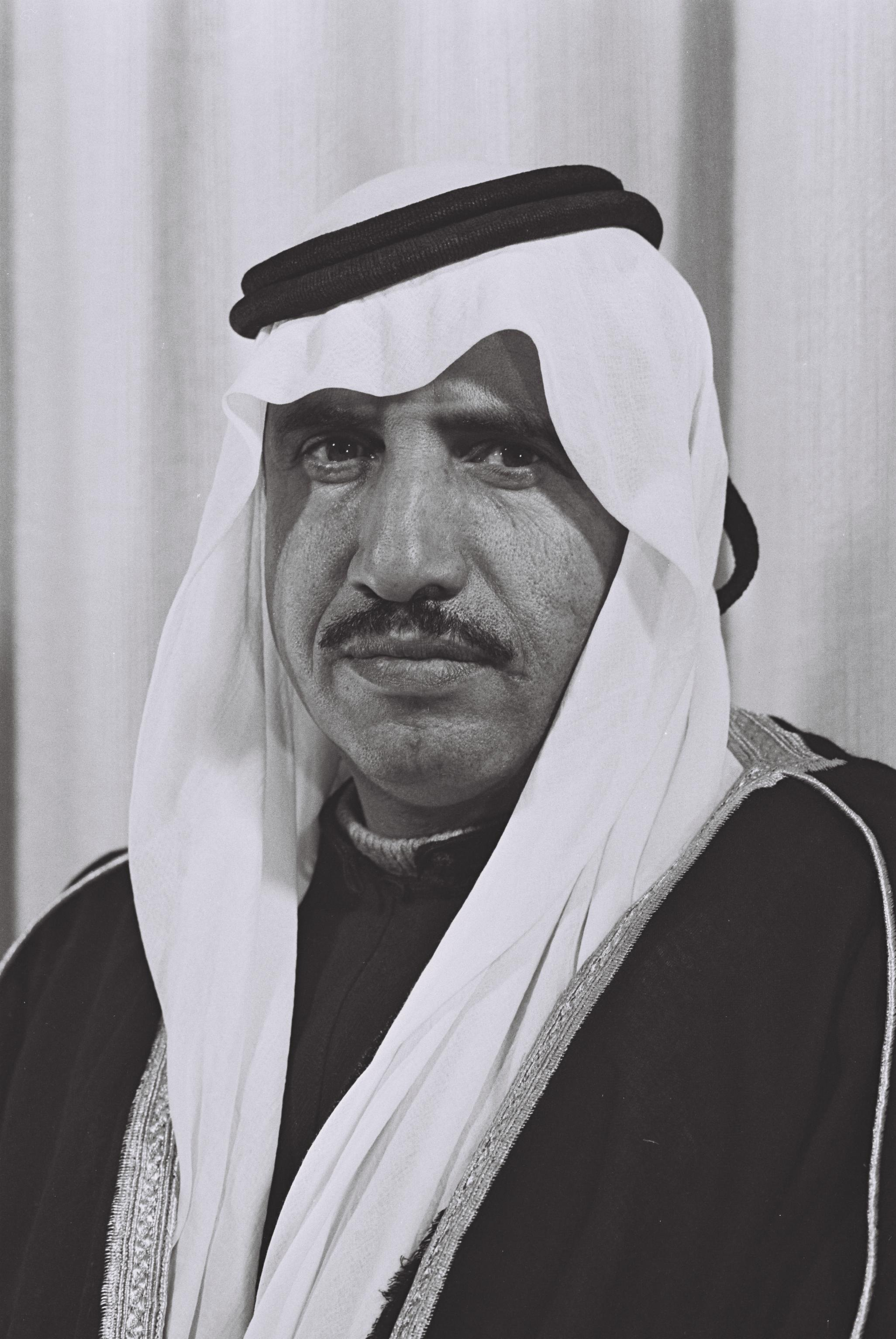
Hamad Abu Rabia

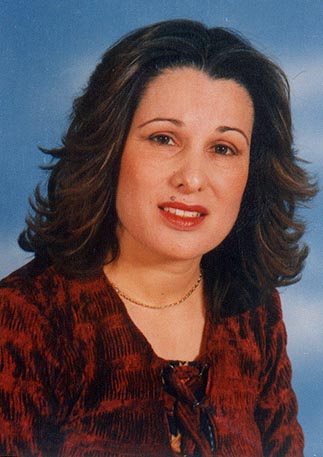
Hussniya Jabara

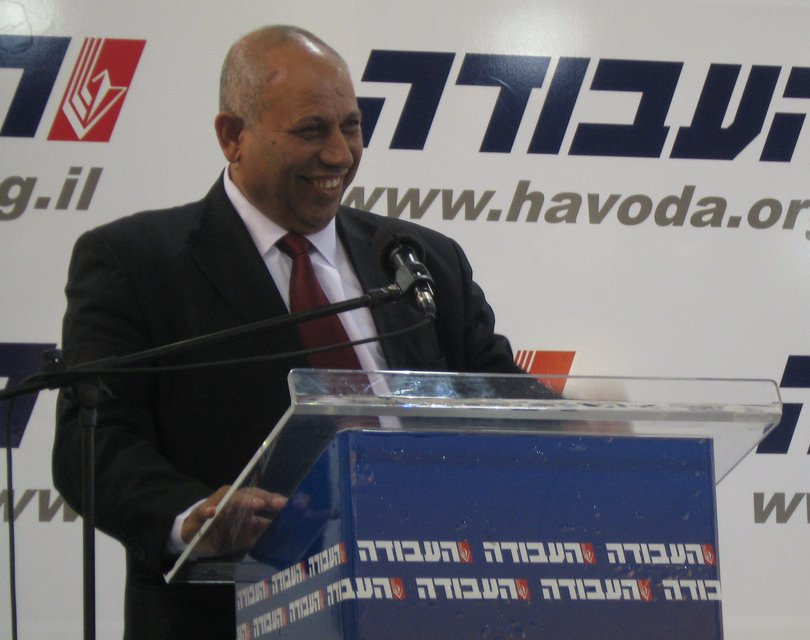
Raleb Majadele

- Abdullah Nimar Darwish – the founder of the Islamic Movement in Israel.
- Hussein Faris – former politician who served as a member of the Knesset for Mapam and Meretz between 1988 and 1992.
- Masud Ghnaim – politician who currently serves as a member of the Knesset for the United Arab List.
- Hussniya Jabara – former politician who served as a member of the Knesset for Meretz between 1999 and 2003. She was the first Israeli Arab woman to become a Knesset member.
- Hamad Khalaily – former politician who served as a member of the Knesset for the Alignment from 1981 until 1984.
- Raleb Majadele – member of the Knesset for the Labor Party. Majadele became the country's first Muslim minister when appointed Minister without Portfolio on 28 January 2007.
- Nawaf Massalha – first Muslim Arab to hold a ministerial position in the Israeli government when he was appointed Deputy Minister of Health by Yitzhak Rabin in 1992.
- Taleb el-Sana – Israeli Bedouin politician and lawyer. He was the longest serving Arab Member of the Knesset until he lost his seat in 2013 Arab Member of the Knesset.
- Ibrahim Sarsur – politician and member of the Knesset for the United Arab List, of which he is the party leader.
- Wasil Taha – politician and member of the Knesset for the Israeli Arab party, Balad.
- Ali Yahya – diplomat. Yahya became the first Israeli ambassador of Arab descent in 1995 when he was appointed ambassador to Finland, a post in which he served until 1999. In 2006 Yahya was appointed Israeli ambassador to Greece.
- Abdel Rahman Zuabi – judge. Zuabi served on the Israeli Supreme Court for nine months in 1999, making him the first Israeli Arab on the country's highest court.
- Jamal Zahalka – Israeli Arab politician who serves as a member of the Knesset representing the Balad party. He is also a Balad party leader.
- Ahmad Tibi – politician and leader of the Arab party Ta'al (the Arab Movement for Renewal). He currently serves as Deputy Speaker of the Knesset.
- Abd el-Aziz el-Zoubi (1926–1974) – politician of Arabic descent, first non-Jewish member of the Knesset.
- Seif el-Din el-Zoubi (1913–1986) – politician, elected to the Knesset in 1949, resigned from politics in 1984.
- Haneen Zoabi – politician. In 2009 she became first Israeli Arab woman on an Arab party's list to be elected to the Knesset.

== Academic figures ==
- Ghazi Falah – Bedouin Israeli-Canadian geographer, who is currently a tenured professor at the University of Akron, Ohio, USA.

== Sports ==
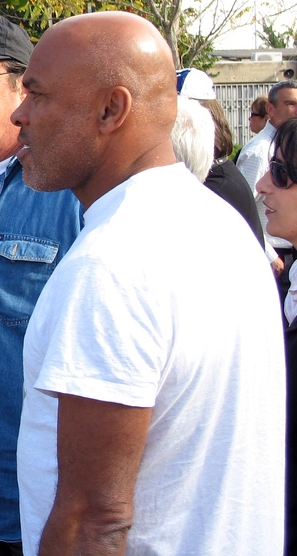
Team Israel Olympian Rifaat Turk

- Mu'nas Dabbur (born 1992) - professional and Team Israel footballer
- Hatem Abd Elhamed (born 1991) - professional and Team Israel footballer
- Beram Kayal (born 1988) - professional and Team Israel footballer
- Dia Saba (born 1992) - professional and Team Israel footballer
- Abbas Suan (born 1976) - footballer from Sakhnin in the Galilee. As a footballer he was considered by many as one of the best Arab-Israeli players.
- Rifaat Turk (born 1954) - Team Israel Olympic footballer, Deputy Mayor of Tel Aviv

== See also ==
- Israelis
- List of notable Israelis
- List of Israeli Arab Christians
- List of Arab citizens of Israel
