= Zoabi =

Zoabi is a surname. Notable people with the surname include:

- Abdel Rahman Zuabi, last name also spelled Zoabi, Arab Israeli judge
- Ghaida Rinawie Zoabi, Arab Israeli activist and politician
- Haneen Zoabi, Arab Israeli politician
- Omran al-Zoubi, last name also spelled Zoabi, Syrian politician
- Sameh Zoabi, Palestinian film writer
