= Nadia Hilou =

Arab-Israeli politician (1953–2015)

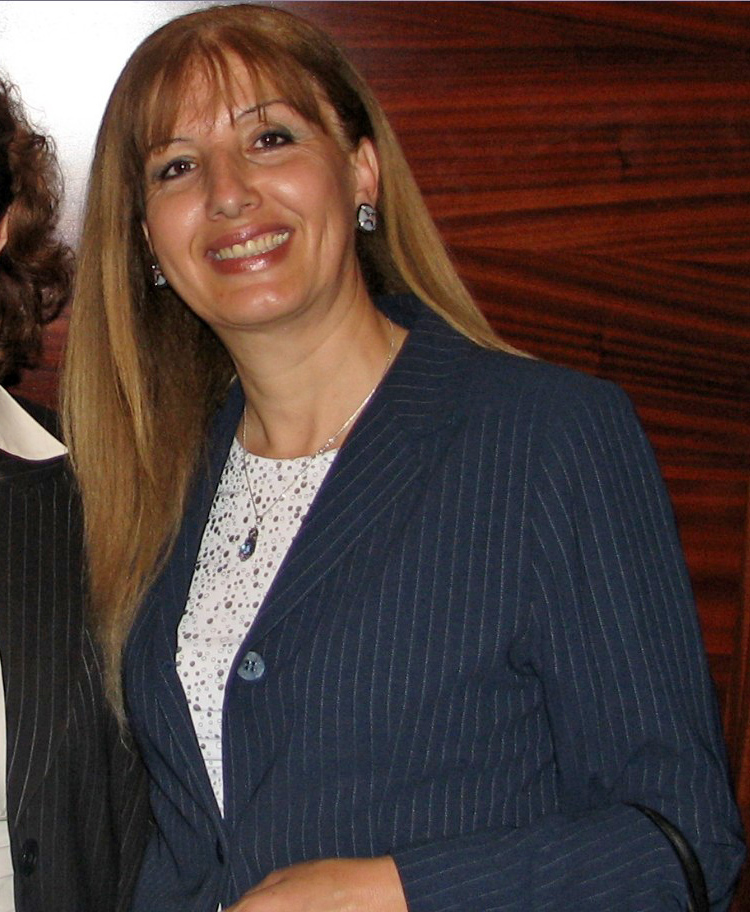

Faction represented in the Knesset
- 2006–2009: Labor Party

Personal details
- Born: 5 July 1953 Jaffa, Israel
- Died: 27 February 2015 (aged 61)

Nadia Hilou (Arabic: ناديا حلو, Hebrew: נאדיה חילו; 5 July 1953 – 27 February 2015) was an Arab-Israeli social worker and politician, who served as a member of the Knesset for the Labor Party between 2006 and 2009. She was the second female Israeli Arab MK after Hussniya Jabara, and also the first female Christian MK.

== Biography ==
Hilou was born in Jaffa, Israel, to Christian Arab parents. She studied at Tel Aviv University where she gained a BA in social work in 1976. She later returned to qualify for an MA in the same subject. In 1997, she became director of the Division for the Status of Women in the Union of local authorities, and in 2002 became deputy chairwoman of the Na'amat Women's Organisation.

Hilou entered politics following the assassination of Yitzhak Rabin in 1995. She joined the Labour Party and was placed 38th on the party's list for the 1996 Knesset elections. However, the party won 34 seats and Hilou did not enter the Knesset. After being given an unrealistic place on the One Israel list for the 1999 elections Hilou joined the One Nation party and was placed sixth on its list. The party won only two seats.

Hilou returned to the Labor Party and in the run-up to the 2006 elections won 15th place (a slot reserved for women) on its list. The party won 19 seats and Hilou took her place in the Knesset, relinquishing her previous positions. She served as chair of the Committee on the Rights of the Child. One of her first acts was to co-sponsor a successful bill strengthening laws against cyber sex with minors. She has also initiated legislation on compensating the relatives of murder victims.

In 2007 she complained about the treatment of her children at Ben-Gurion Airport by security staff, saying that their treatment was "humiliating." She lost her seat in the 2009 elections.

In 2013 her autobiography, titled The Pioneer from Ajami, was published in Hebrew by HaKibbutz HaMeuhad Press.

Hilou lived in Jaffa and died in February 2015 from cancer. She was survived by a husband and four daughters, Natali, Cristina, Rola and Rena.

== Bibliography ==
- Poretzet HaDerekh MiAjami (The Trailblazer from Ajami), HaKibbutz HaMeuhad, 2013 (in Hebrew)

== See also ==
- Women in Israel
