= Rot Front =

Rot Front (German: Red Front) may refer to:

- Roter Frontkämpferbund (Red Front Fighters' League), a German paramilitary organization commonly known as Rotfront
  - Die Rote Front, the newspaper of Rotfrontkämpferbund
  - "Rot Front!", German communist greeting

== Other ==
- Rot Front (confectionery brand), a confectionery factory in Russia
- Rot-Front, a German village in Kyrgyzstan
- RotFront, a German world music band
- Antonov RF-8 Rot Front, one version of a Soviet glider developed by Oleg Antonov
- Russian United Labour Front (ROT Front), a communist party in Russia
- Rot-Front Poltava, early name of FC Enerhiia Poltava, a football club in Poltava

== See also ==
- Red Front (disambiguation)
