= FC Enerhiia Poltava =

Defunct professional football club based in Poltava, Ukraine

Enerhiia Poltava
- Founded: 1926
- Dissolved: 1958
- Ground: Poltava

Football Club Enerhiia Poltava (Ukrainian: ФК Енергія Полтава); was a Ukrainian Soviet football team based in Poltava, Ukraine. During the 1930s it was one of the best teams in Poltava.

== History ==
At the Metal factory (now Poltava Machine Building Plant) a football club named Metalist was established in summer of 1926. A board of the union of metal workers and Volodymyr Peter were behind the team creation. Peter was a former Sokil, Spartak and united Poltava team player. He became the clubs first captain. Club took part in Poltava city championship in call B. After finishing first in their league, club faced YuzhRaion-1. The match finished in a nil-nil draw. In November 1934 the Metal factory was renamed into Pavel Postyshev factory. Team was renamed Postyshev Factory club. Two years later club was renamed Rot Front. During 1937 the club finished third in the medium-sized machine-building plants all soviet competition. In 1938 club finished second in the newly created Poltava Oblast Championship. Club also took part in 1938 Cup of the Ukrainian SSR where they lost in their first match. After the war ended club was renamed Enerhiia in 1947. In oblast championship Enerhiia failed to reach the final stage. In the Cup they lost in second round. In 1951 Enerhiia finished fifth in their group. They finished third in Poltava city championship. Next year they finished first in their zone, in the final part they finished second. They repeated their accomplishments a year later. In the cup Enerhiia lost in the semifinal. Team took part in Republican soviet Enerhiia competition in Nova Kakhovka. They won the final replay. In city championship they finished second. In 1954 Enerhiia reached the cup semifinal where they lost. They won the regional health department competition in Poltava. In the championship they finished second. In 1955 they finished first in Zone 2 and second in the final part. They won the cup against Avanhard Kriukiv. This year they again won the Republican soviet Enerhiia competition. Thy also won the city championship. In 1956 the club finished first in Zone 2 and first in the final part. Enerhiia finished fifth in the city championship and lost in the city cup final. In 1957 the club finished third in the championship. They also reached the cup semifinal. Next year they finished fifth in the championship. In 1958 club seized to exist.

== Name change ==
- Metalist Poltava (1926–November 1934)
- Postyshev Factory club (November 1934–1936)
- Rot Front Poltava (1936–1941)
- Enerhiia Poltava (1947–1958)

== Honours ==
Poltava Oblast Championship

Winners (1): 1956 (Spring)
Runners-up (5): 1938, 1952, 1953, 1954, 1955
Third place (1): 1957

Poltava Oblast Cup

Winners (1): 1955

Poltava Championship

Winners (1): 1955
Runners-up (1): 1952,
Third place (1): 1951

Poltava Cup

Winners (1): 1953
Runners-up (1): 1956,

== Sources ==
- Lomov, Anatolii; Stadnychenko, Oleksandr (2009), 100 Років Полтавському Футболу [100 Years of Poltava Football] (in Ukrainian), Poltava: Poltava, ISBN 978-966-97035-0-7
- Lomov, Anatolii; Kryvorotko, Serhii (2010), Энциклопедия Полтавского Футбола (1909-2010) [Encyclopedia of Poltava Football (1909-2010)] (in Russian), Poltava: OOO "ASMI", ISBN 978-966-182-118-6
