= Silvia Heubach =

German-American mathematician

Silvia Heubach is a German-American mathematician specializing in enumerative combinatorics, combinatorial game theory, and bioinformatics. She is Professor Emerita of Mathematics at California State University, Los Angeles.

== Education and career ==
Heubach earned bachelor's and master's degrees in mathematics and economics from the University of Ulm in 1983 and 1986, respectively. Through a program at the University of Ulm, she came to the University of Southern California (USC) for a one-year exchange, but decided to stay on for a Ph.D. program. She completed a master's degree in mathematics in 1988 and a Ph.D. in applied mathematics at USC in 1992. Her dissertation, A Stochastic Model for the Movement of a White Blood Cell, was supervised by Joseph C. Watkins..

After completing her doctorate, Heubach held visiting faculty positions at Colorado College and Humboldt State University before joining the faculty at California State University, Los Angeles in 1994.

== Contributions ==
Heubach is the co-author of the book Combinatorics of Compositions and Words (with Toufik Mansour, CRC Press, 2009). She is a contributor of chapters on Probability and Statistics to both, "Concepts in Bioinformatics and Genomics" by Jamil Momand and Alison McCurdy, Oxford University Press, 2016, and "Concepts in Bioinformatics and Genomics, 2nd Edition" by Jamil Momand and Eliot Bush, Oxford University Press, 2025.

Her research in combinatorial game theory has also included analysis of a variant of Nim in which piles of pebbles are placed on the edges of a tetrahedron and each move removes at least one pebble from the set of edges incident to a single triangle of the tetrahedron.

== Recognition ==
In 2018, Heubach won the California State University system's Faculty Innovation and Leadership Award, becoming the first professor at the Los Angeles campus of the system to be so honored. The award honored her educational initiatives including developing a new sequence of mathematics courses for life sciences students, developing flipped classroom mathematics courses, and improving statistics courses used to fulfill general education requirements.
