= Adam Maraana =

Israeli swimmer (born 2003)

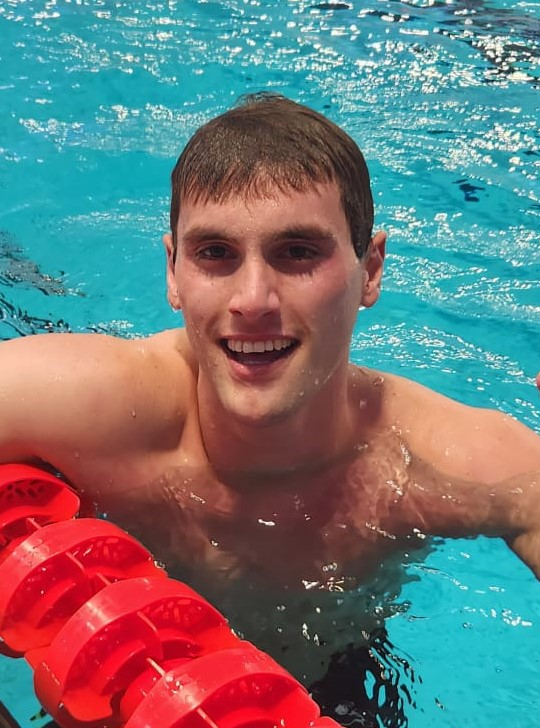
- Maraana in 2024

Personal information
- Native name: אדם מראענה
- Born: 7 July 2003 (age 23) Haifa, Israel

Sport
- Sport: Swimming
- Strokes: Backstroke
- Club: Maccabi Haifa
- College team: University of North Carolina at Chapel Hill (committed)
- Coach: Carmel Levitan
Medal record
Men's swimming
Representing Israel
European U-23 Swimming Championships
Bronze medal – third place	2023 Dublin	50 m backstroke
European Youth Olympic Festival
Bronze medal – third place	2019 Baku	100 m backstroke

Adam Maraana (Hebrew: אדם מראענה; born 7 July 2003) is an Arab-Israeli swimmer who has qualified to represent Israel in the 2024 Paris Olympics. He won bronze medals at the 2019 European Youth Olympics and at the 2023 European U-23 championship in the 100-metre backstroke. In 2024, he matched the Israeli national record in the 100 back. Maraana represented Israel at the 2024 Paris Olympics in swimming in the 100 metre backstroke. He said that during a time of tension within the Arab community in Israel, he believes that as an Arab who is an Israeli citizen he can succeed as a goodwill "mini-ambassador".

== Early and personal life ==
Maraana was born and lives in Haifa, Israel, and is an Arab citizen of Israel. His father, Nazi Maraana, (Note: First name pronounced as "nah-zee", in contrast to the Nazi party, which is pronounced as "naht-see".) is a Muslim Arab-Israeli and manages a beach in the Bat Galim neighborhood of Haifa. His mother Alexandra Nikonov was born to a Russian father and an Ashkenazi Jewish mother who immigrated from Russia who teaches piano. Both are Israeli citizens. His parents met on a beach in Haifa. His younger sister, Ella, was a rhythmic gymnast. His father supports Maraana representing the State of Israel.

Maraana said: "I am Israeli and come from a mixed city, and things like this happen when a Jew marries a Muslim woman and vice versa. The beauty of this city, in this country where there is so much mixing."

He served in the Israel Defense Forces (IDF), in the Israeli Navy, turning down an exemption from the draft as a member of the Arab community. Maraana said: "Even though I could get away with it because my father is Arab-Muslim, I didn't choose to use it, and I wanted to contribute my part – everyone joins the army, so why shouldn't I join? I didn't want to feel different, and I came to contribute."

== Swimming career ==
Maraana's father threw him in the water when he was three years old, to teach him to swim. His swim club is Maccabi Haifa, and he trains at Israel's Wingate Institute near Netanya, where his coach is Carmel Levitan.

He said that:

When I stood at the podium after the Israeli championships and heard the [Israeli] national anthem, tears fell from my eyes. At the multi-nation competition where I was first on the podium, I took the flag and held it tight. I sang the national anthem proudly, and said it was the craziest moment in my life.

=== 2019–23; European U-23 championship bronze medal ===
At the 2019 European Youth Olympic Festival, Maraana won a bronze medal at 16 years old in Baku, Azerbaijan, in the 100m backstroke in a time of 56.63. In 2020 at the 54e Challenge International de Geneve in Switzerland, he won the gold medal in the 50 back with a time of 57.16, and the silver medal in the 200 back with a time of 2:06.29. At the 2020 Israeli Olympic Qualification Meet at the Wingate Institute, at 17 years old he won the gold medal in the backstroke as he swam a time of 55.64.

At the 2021 Union Cup in Israel, at 18 years of age Maraana set a new Israeli junior record in the 100 back with a time of 55.07. At the 2022 Malmsten Swim Open Stockholm in Sweden, he won the gold medal in the 50 back in a time of 25.98.

Maraana won a bronze medal in the 2023 European U-23 Swimming Championships in Dublin, Ireland, in the 50 back with a time of 25.30. At the same competition he swam the 100 back in 54.31, coming in fifth. He won a bronze medal at the 2023 Israeli Championships in the 100 back in a time of 54.92.

=== 2024–present; Israeli record ===
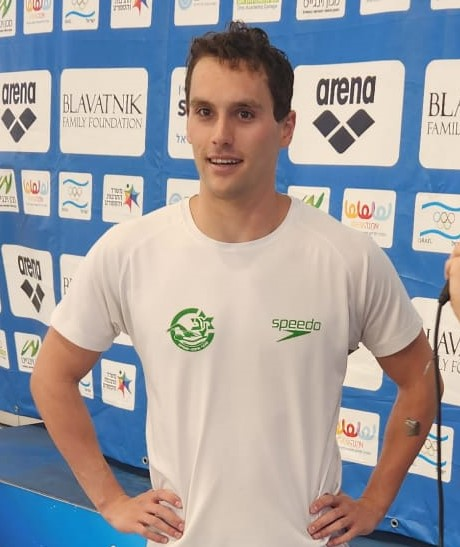
Maraana in 2024

In January 2024, at the 57th Challenge International de Geneve in Switzerland, Maraana won the gold medal in the 50 back, with a time of 25.65. In April 2024, at the Eindhoven Qualification Meet in the Netherlands, he won the gold medal in the 100 back in a time of 54.62. He also won a bronze medal in the 50 back with a time of 25.34, which through July 2024 was the third-fastest Israeli time at the distance.

In June 2024, at 20 years of age he won the 100 back gold medal at the Israeli Olympic Trials with a time in the preliminaries of 53.60 at the Wingate Institute. Maraana's time matched the Israeli record set by Olympian Yakov Toumarkin seven years earlier. He qualified to swim in the 100 back in the 2024 Paris Olympics, as he swam faster than the Olympic 'A' cut of 53.74. He said: "I surprised myself. I'm very happy."

Maraana has committed to attend the University of North Carolina at Chapel Hill in the fall of 2024. He will swim for coach and former two-time Olympic gold medalist Mark Gangloff on the North Carolina Tar Heels swimming team.

His best personal time in the 100 back is 53.24, which Maraana swam in 2021 at 18 years of age.

Maraana says that in this dark time he believes that he can succeed as a goodwill "mini-ambassador". He said: "I'm proud to represent Israel, I feel a bit like a mini-ambassador, and I'm proud of it. As someone who came out of the Arab community and considers himself Israeli, I am the best proof of the integration of both communities."

=== 2024 Paris Olympics ===
Maraana represented Israel at the 2024 Paris Olympics in Paris in swimming in the men's 100 metre backstroke.

== See also ==
- Eduard Meron, Arab-Israeli Olympic weightlifter
- Rifaat Turk, Arab-Israeli Olympic footballer
- Iyad Shalabi, Arab-Israeli Paralympic swimmer
- List of Arab citizens of Israel
- List of Israeli records in swimming
