= United Arab List (1977) =

United Arab List רשימה ערבית מאוחדת
- Leader: Hamad Abu Rabia
- Founded: March 1977
- Split from: Progress and Development; Arab List for Bedouin and Villagers
- Ideology: Israeli Arab interests
- National affiliation: Labor Party
- Most MKs: 3 (1973)
- Fewest MKs: 1 (1977)

Election symbol
- ימ

The United Arab List (Hebrew: רשימה ערבית מאוחדת, Reshima Aravit Meuhedet) was an Arab satellite list in Israel during the late 1970s and early 1980s. It is not connected to the modern day United Arab List.

== History ==
The UAL was established on 8 March 1977, during the eighth Knesset by the merger of the Arab List for Bedouins and Villagers and Progress and Development. Both were Israeli Arab parties associated with the Labor Party, and had merged into it the Labor-dominated Alignment alliance shortly after the 1973 elections, only to break away again. The new party had three seats in the Knesset, held by Hamad Abu Rabia, Jabr Muadi and veteran Israeli Arab politician, Seif-El-Din El-Zubi.

In the 1977 elections the party won just one seat. The three former MKs agreed to take it on a rotation basis. El-Zubi held the seat first, staying in the Knesset until 3 April 1979, and was then replaced by Abu Rabia. However, Abu Rabia refused to give up the seat in favour of Muadi and the case was taken to court which ruled the initial agreement invalid. Abu Rabia was then assassinated on 12 January 1981 by Muadi's sons. Despite his family's role in Abu Rabia's death, Muadi took the seat for the remainder of the Knesset session.

The Labor Party withdrew its support for the UAL prior to the 1981 elections, in which the Alignment tripled its vote share among Israeli Arabs. The UAL failed to cross the electoral threshold and subsequently disappeared.
