= Arab List for Bedouin and Villagers =

Arab Satellite list in Israel (1973–1977)

Arab List for Bedouin and Villagers القائمة العربية للبدو والفلاحين רשימה ערבית לבדואים ולכפריים
- Leader: Hamad Abu Rabia
- Dissolved: 8 March 1977
- Split from: Alignment (4 January 1977)
- Merged into: Alignment (26 February 1974); United Arab List (8 March 1977)
- Ideology: Israeli Arab interests
- National affiliation: Labor Party
- Most MKs: 1 (1973–1974, 1977)
- Fewest MKs: 1 (1973–1974, 1977)

Election symbol
- עא

The Arab List for Bedouin and Villagers (Hebrew: רשימה ערבית לבדואים וכפריים, Reshima Aravit LeBedouim VeKfariym, Arabic: القائمة العربية للبدو والفلاحين) was an Arab satellite list in Israel.

== Background ==
The party was created in the run-up to the 1973 elections as an Israeli Arab party associated with the governing Alignment. Headed by Hamad Abu Rabia, the new party just crossed the electoral threshold, gaining 1% of the vote, and claiming one seat in the Knesset, taken by Abu Rabia.

On 26 February 1974 the party merged into the Alignment together with the other Alignment-linked Israeli Arab party, Progress and Development. On 4 January 1977 Abu Rabia left the Alignment and re-established the Arab List for Bedouin and Villagers. On 8 March it merged with Progress and Development to form the United Arab List. The new party claimed one seat in the 1977 elections, which was taken on a rotation basis by three party members, including Abu Rabia. However, in 1981 Rabia was assassinated by the sons of party rival Jabr Muadi for allegedly refusing to keep to the rotation agreement.
