= Rifaat Turk =

Israeli footballer

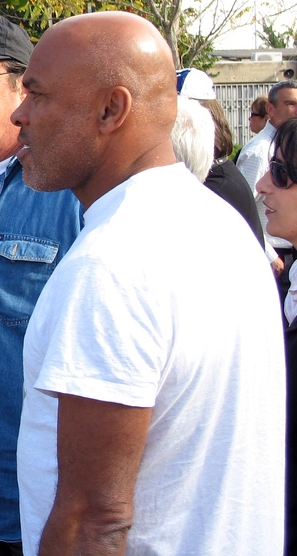
- Turk in 2006

Personal information
- Date of birth: 16 September 1954 (age 72)
- Place of birth: Jaffa, Tel Aviv, Israel
- Height: 1.80 m (5 ft 11 in)
- Position: Midfielder

Youth career
- 1970–1972: Hapoel Tel Aviv

Senior career*
Years	Team	Apps	(Gls)
1972–84	Hapoel Tel Aviv		
1983	→ Hapoel Ramat Gan (loan)		
1984–86	Hapoel Jerusalem		

International career
1976–86	Israel	34	(3)

Managerial career
- 1997: Hapoel Tayibe
- 2015–16: Maccabi Ahi Nazareth
- * Club domestic league appearances and goals

Rifaat "Jimmy" Turk (Arabic: رفعت ترك; Hebrew: רפעת "ג'ימי" טורק, nicknamed Jimmy the Rocket; born 16 September 1954) is an Israeli former footballer, manager, and former Deputy Mayor of Tel Aviv-Yafo. Turk has been the first Arab-Muslim to play for the Israel national team and to represent the country in football at the Olympic Games.

== Early life ==
Born in the Ajami neighborhood of Jaffa, Israel, to Arab-Israeli parents, Turk was the son of a fisherman, and is Muslim. He was the second of eight children of Hichmat Türk. He dropped out of school during the eighth grade. He was 180 cm (5 ft 11 in) tall, and weighed 75 kg (165 lb), during his playing days.

== Football career ==
=== Israeli teams ===
After being spotted by chance by a scout while playing on a beach in 1970 at the age of 16, Turk joined Hapoel Tel Aviv's youth team, and made his debut for the senior club in July 1972. In 1980, he was named Israel's player of the year. He won the Israeli championship with the team in 1981. He played for Hapoel Ramat Gan on loan from July 1982 until July 1983, when he returned to Hapoel Tel Aviv. After leaving Hapoel Tel Aviv as a player in 1984, Turk signed with Hapoel Jerusalem in July 1984. He retired from playing in July 1987.

In 2013, Turk played on the Israeli Peace Team, an over-35-years-of-age all-star team of Israeli former professional soccer players who were Muslim, Jewish, and Christian, some who had competed on Israel's national soccer team. The Israeli Peace Team toured the United States, promoting peace through football.

Turk was the pioneer for dozens of Arab-Israeli football players who followed him, and a pioneer of Arab-Jewish integration in Israeli football. In 2012, all but one of the football teams in the Israeli first division had at least one Arab-Israeli player, and the league's top two goalscorers were Arab-Israelis. By 2020, almost half the players on Team Israel were Arab-Israeli players.

=== Team Israel and Olympics ===
Turk made his debut for the Israel national team, at 21 years of age, on 25 July 1976, playing for Team Israel manager David Schweitzer. He played 33 games for the Israeli national team in his career from 1976 to 1986, scoring three goals. On the one hand, Turk was subjected to anti-Arab abuse during nearly every game he played; at the same time however, the request that Arab players join the Israeli national team was met with total acceptance by the vast majority of Jewish Israelis, with only very rare exceptions. Several Arab-Israeli football players have since represented Israel, including Walid Badir, Zahi Armeli, Mu'nas Dabbur, Mohammad Ghadir, and Abbas Suan.

He became the first Arab to represent Israel at the Olympic Games when Turk played as a midfielder in the football tournament of the 1976 Summer Olympics. Israel came in 5th in that Olympic Games, behind Brazil, which handed Israel its only defeat, in the quarterfinals.

=== Manager and TV commentator ===
Turk went on to manage a number of clubs, including Hapoel Tel Aviv from 1989 to 1992 (during which time it was 18–9–13), and Hapoel Tayibe in 1997 (1–2–7), the first Arab club to play in the top division.

On 7 July 2015 Turk replaced Nissan Yehezkel as Maccabi Ahi Nazareth's manager until January 2016 (3–0–2), which played in Israel's Liga Artzit.

He later served as a television commentator on football in Israeli Premier League games.

=== Honours ===
- Israeli Championships (1):
  - 1980–81
- Player of the Year
  - 1980

=== International goals ===
No.	Date	Venue	Opponent	Score	Result	Competition
1.	3 September 1985	Ramat Gan Stadium, Ramat Gan, Israel	Chinese Taipei	1–0	6–0	1986 FIFA World Cup qualification
2.	3 September 1985	Ramat Gan Stadium, Ramat Gan, Israel	Chinese Taipei	2–0	6–0	1986 FIFA World Cup qualification
3.	3 September 1985	Ramat Gan Stadium, Ramat Gan, Israel	Chinese Taipei	5–0	6–0	1986 FIFA World Cup qualification

== Political career; Deputy Mayor of Tel Aviv ==
Turk is a member of the Israeli Meretz political party. He was elected to the Tel Aviv City Council in 1998. In 2003, he was elected the Deputy Mayor of Tel Aviv. In 2008, when Israeli former basketball star Tal Brody entered politics, Turk advised that in his view: "The political field is much more dirty and self-interested than the field of sports."

== Personal life ==
Turk's son Hanes is part of Hapoel Tel Aviv's youth system.

== See also ==
- Adam Maraana, Arab-Israeli swimmer
- Eduard Meron, Arab-Israeli Olympic weightlifter
- Iyad Shalabi, Arab-Israeli Paralympic swimmer
- List of Arab citizens of Israel
- List of Israeli international footballers
- List of sportsperson-politicians
