= Ayoob Kara =

Israeli Druze politician (born 1955)

- أيوب قرا
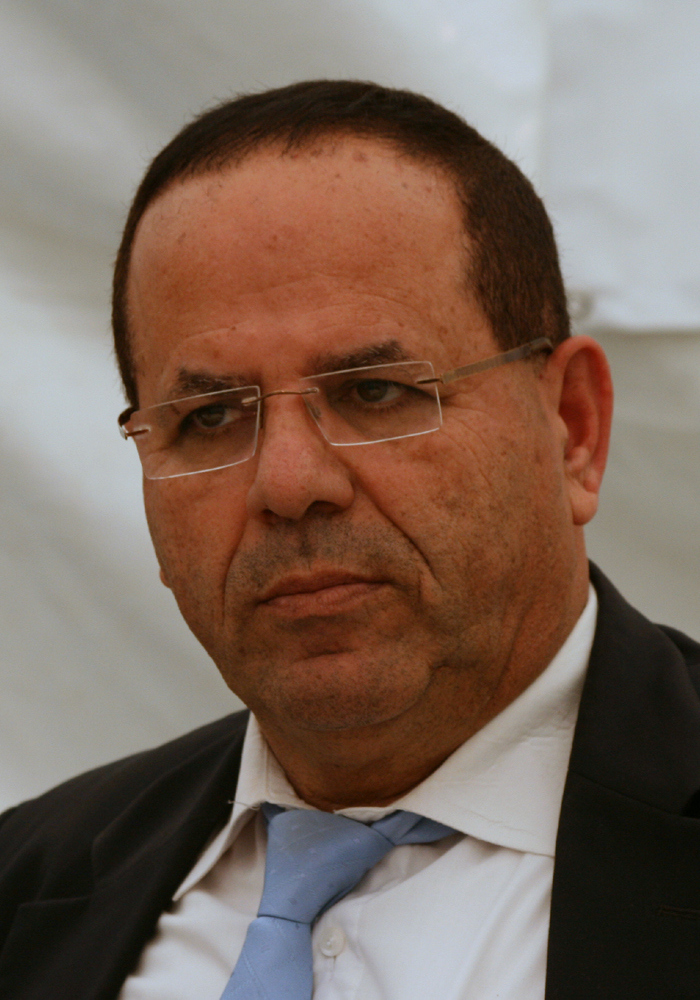

Ministerial roles
- 2017: Minister in the PM's Office
- 2017–2019: Minister of Communications

Faction represented in the Knesset
- 1999–2006: Likud
- 2009–2013: Likud
- 2015–2019: Likud
- 2020–2021: Likud

Personal details
- Born: 12 March 1955 (age 71) Daliyat al-Karmel, Israel
- Education: Ono Academic College (LLB); Tel Aviv University (MA)

Military service
- Branch/service: Israel Defense Forces
- Rank: Rav séren (Major)

Ayoob Kara (Arabic: أيوب قرا; Hebrew: איוב קרא; born 12 March 1955) is an Israeli Druze politician. He has served as a member of the Knesset for Likud in four terms between 1999 and 2021, and as Minister of Communications.

== Biography ==
Kara was born in Daliyat al-Karmel, a Druze town near Haifa. He went to an agricultural high school in Kfar Galim. He spent a year playing professional association football as a defensive back for Bnei Yehuda Tel Aviv F.C. He later served in the Israel Defense Forces reserve and attained the rank of major, before being discharged for post-traumatic stress disorder. Serving alongside Jews before and after the establishment of Israel has been a source of family pride: his uncle was killed during the Arab revolt in 1939, and his father served in the IDF during the 1948 Arab–Israeli War. Another uncle was also killed by Arabs then, and two of his brothers were killed in action in the 1982 Lebanon War. Following his national service, Kara studied law at Ono Academic College and received a master's at Tel Aviv University. He lives in Daliyat al-Karmel with his wife and five children.

== Political career ==
Kara was placed 35th on the Likud–Gesher–Tzomet list that won 32 seats in the 1996 elections. He urged Likud party chairman Ariel Sharon to campaign for the Arab vote. Sharon agreed on the importance, and need for an Arab minister in government. Kara was elected in 1999, becoming the third Druze Likud MK in history, after Amal Nasser el-Din and Assad Assad. He was appointed Deputy Speaker of the Knesset, and served as chairman of the Committee on Foreign Workers. He retained his seat in the 2003 elections and became chairman of the Anti-Drug Committee. Speaking out during the Second Intifada, he condemned Arab MKs for incitement.

Kara opposed the Israeli disengagement from the Gaza Strip championed by prime minister Ariel Sharon, and was almost ejected from Knesset with Michael Ratzon for "repeated disturbances". When Sharon announced plans to break from Likud, Kara refused to defect to Kadima in 2005 and criticized other MKs that did, including Shaul Mofaz. He praised Likud's "glorious past" and said it will return stronger, despite the split. He lost his seat in the 2006 elections, when Likud dropped to 12 seats. Nevertheless, he remained active in politics. He met with Hebron residents and criticized the demolition of a Jewish home there, calling Kadima leader Tzipi Livni as "good for Hamas".

=== Deputy Minister ===
Announcing his intention to run in the Likud primary for the 2009 elections, Kara called for unity between Druze and Jews, "to strengthen the Zionist connection...that has been damaged in recent years." He reminded voters of his opposition to the disengagement from Gaza, making it an important part of his campaign. He was placed 23rd on the party's list, and returned to the Knesset when Likud won 27 seats. Kara sought and received a ministerial post: becoming Israel's new Deputy Minister of the Development of the Negev and Galilee. He was the first non-Jewish nationalist to receive a portfolio. Kara opposed the inclusion of Kadima in Netanyahu's government, saying that Likud had "no room for traitors".

As Deputy Minister, Kara cited demographic issues as a growing threat to Israel. He promoted development of the two regions to encourage Jews to stay and work there. He worked to help former soldiers to study for free at colleges in the Negev and Galilee, as well as a new college of medicine in the latter. He also supported the building of casinos in the Negev. In addition, he promoted a program in Knesset to train Druze firefighters that will serve in Jewish towns in the West Bank. Later, with Kara's help, ZAKA volunteers began to establish volunteer rescue services in northern Druze and Arab towns in September 2010, starting with Beit Jann and Yirka.

Kara was placed 39th on the Likud Yisrael Beiteinu list for the 2013 elections, losing his seat as the alliance won only 31 seats. However, he returned to the Knesset following the 2015 elections, for which he was placed 24th on the Likud list. He was subsequently appointed Deputy Minister of Regional Cooperation.

=== Minister of Communications ===
Netanyahu appointed Kara as Minister in the Prime Minister's Office in January 2017, and then as Minister of Communications May of that year. He was placed 39th on the Likud list for the April 2019 elections and not re-elected. A tape was leaked in September 2019 of a conversation between Kara and Netanyahu in which the latter demanded that Kara close down the Cable and Satellite Broadcasting Council. Kara was blamed by several Likud politicians for the leak, but denied involvement.

== Diplomacy ==
Shortly after the 2009 election, the family of Ouda Tarabin, an Israeli Bedouin convicted of espionage in absentia by Egypt, enlisted Kara's support to gain Tarabin's release. Tarabin entered Egypt in 2000 illegally, and was arrested and sentenced to 15 years in prison. Kara also led a group of Druze, Bedouins, and Muslims that met with the family of Gilad Shalit to show support for his release from Hamas, who kidnapped Shalit in a 2006 raid.

Kara met with Turkish ambassador to Israel, Ahmet Oğuz Çelikkol, to improve Israel–Turkey relations, citing Turkey as a "proven" ally to Israel. However, relations deteriorated after the 2010 Gaza flotilla raid. Kara has also been instrumental in improving relations with Syria and Lebanon. Just before the 2009 election, he claimed to have met with Syrian officials in Washington, D. C., who said Syria was interested in revisiting talks to improve relations. However, the Syrian embassy in Washington denied the meeting took place, as did a spokesman for Israeli prime minister Benjamin Netanyahu. He has also been outspoken in his opposition to proposed divisions of the border village of Ghajar, comparing it to the Berlin Wall.

He worked to improve economic and humanitarian ties between Israel and Syria in 2010. Druze farmers in the Golan Heights now import water from Syria and export thousands of tons of apples every year. In addition, Druze were able to visit relatives in Syria for the first time in decades and also receive organ transplants there. He has also coordinated burials for families between Syria, Lebanon, and Israel. Kara is hopeful that these "cracks in the great wall between Israel and Syria" will one day lead to real negotiations for peace. Or at the very least, he hopes to cut down the bureaucracy preventing humanitarian exchanges between Israel and Syria. Kara has also called for mines to be removed from the Golan Heights, citing them as dangerous to travelers and not needed for Israel's defense.

When several pro-Israel European politicians visited Israel, Kara and other Knesset members joined the Europeans to condemn the Gaza disengagement, and lack of assistance to former Jewish residents of Gaza, who had been expelled from their homes. Kara urged stronger relationships with European politicians that support Israel. Kara visited Austria in December 2010 and met with Heinz-Christian Strache, leader of the Freedom Party of Austria, praising him at a joint press conference and calling him a "friend of Israel" in its war on terror. Austria's Jewish community complained in a letter addressed to Israeli Prime Minister Benyamin Netanyahu about the meeting and the praise and honor bestowed by Kara on the party and its members, particularly in light of the party's anti-semitic remarks and their praise for the Nazi regime of the Third Reich. Israel had scaled back its diplomatic relations with Austria when the party first entered into the Austrian government in 2000.

Suleiman Alhariri, the head of a South Sudan delegation to a meeting in February 2011 of a new organization to develop Nigeria, invited Kara to help begin setting up diplomatic relations. Kara led a delegation of Jewish, Muslim, Druze, and Christian religious leaders to discuss interfaith relations in Istanbul with TV show host Adnan Oktar. The delegation presented a list of Jewish religious sites in Syria for the opposition in the Syrian civil war to guard, should unrest threaten the sites. The group planned to set up a religious court to arbitrate regional disputes. Kara also said "Turkey is eager to reestablish its ties with Israel." Kara claimed in May 2011 that the opposition movement in the Syrian Civil War had approached him for help in obtaining support from the United Nations, United States, and European Union.

Kara was part of a delegation of Israeli politicians who visited Poland at the invitation of the Polish Redemptorist priest Tadeusz Rydzyk in late 2017. The purpose of the visit was to support Rydzyk's effort to draw greater attention to the Polish Righteous Among the Nations who saved Jews from the Nazis during the Holocaust. Rydzyk and his radio station, Radio Maryja, have repeatedly been accused of anti-Semitism, notably by the Anti-Defamation League and the World Jewish Congress.

Knesset Deputy Speaker Yehiel Bar, Rabbi Dov Lipman (a former Yesh Atid MK), Kara, and other politicians attended a Radio Maryja commemoration ceremony in Toruń devoted to the theme of "Remembrance and Hope", and attended by then-Polish prime minister Beata Szydło. The group was attacked in the Israeli media over their visit.

== Political positions ==
Kara is known as a staunch conservative in the Knesset, supporting "hawkish" and Zionist views. He opposed the Gaza disengagement and the 2009–10 settlement freeze. He was a supporter of Moshe Feiglin's Manhigut Yehudit faction, within Likud.

=== Arab–Israeli conflict ===
Kara believes that Israel "has no one to make peace with", and that all the peace partners aim to weaken Israel. He noted that many Israelis think like Europeans and do not understand the thought process in the Middle East. He criticized the Oslo accords for giving "the criminal Palestinian leadership that was in Lebanon and Tunisia the legitimacy to be leaders in Judea, Samaria, and Gaza".

He endorsed a three-state solution in an interview, saying that Egypt should resume control over the Gaza Strip. He noted that Arabs almost universally call for a restoration of the situation prior to the Six-Day War, when the territory was part of Egypt. In addition, he mentioned that it would be beneficial to the security of Egypt to eliminate Iranian influence in the territory. In an interview, Kara noted that "In all history there was never a Palestinian state." He proposed that Jordan, which is 90% Palestinian take administrative control of Arab cities in the West Bank, while Israel would control defense, major cities, and broad areas in the territory.

Kara and fellow MK Aryeh Eldad met with Glenn Beck in 2011. After Eldad said that there was a Palestinian state in Jordan, Kara added "the world doesn't understand that there are already two states here, and now, they want three states. There were never Palestinians in this area" During the same meeting, he explained his Zionism as consistent with the Druze tradition that they are descendants of Jethro, and "commanded to watch over the Land of Israel for the People of Israel". At the first International Regional Cooperation Conference in Tel Aviv, Kara said Israel should negotiate with businessmen rather than the Palestinian Authority leadership.

=== Capital punishment ===
Kara called for the imposition of the death penalty in the case of the 2010 Tapuah Junction stabbing of Ihab Khatib, a Druze, by a Palestinian Authortity policeman.

He stated he had information that the 2010 Mount Carmel forest fire was "a terrorist act", and called for the perpetrators to be executed like Adolf Eichmann. Some of the 41 killed in the blaze were Druze.

=== Gaza ===
During the months preceding Israel's disengagement from the Gaza Strip and northern West Bank, Kara requested from then Prime Minister, Ariel Sharon, that Druze soldiers not be assigned to tasks related to the disengagement, since the Druze opposed the plan, and did not want to have anything to do with it. He was threatened with expulsion from the Knesset for trying to obstruct the plan as it went through. The Israeli media called him the "prophet of fury". Years earlier, he opposed the Israeli withdrawal from Lebanon in 2000, warning that Hezbollah would gain power in Israel's absence.

After the Gaza flotilla raid, Kara spoke with a leading mufti in Turkey. He told the mufti that Israel conducted the operation legally and humanely and presented facts backing his claims. In addition, he said "Israel is the most humanitarian country in the Middle East and never objected to the transfer of humanitarian aid to Gaza," and the flotilla organizers intended to provoke Israel. He also asked the mufti to preach brotherhood between Israel and Turkey, "saying there are no winners in war." At a meeting hosted by Turkish television personality Adnan Oktar, Kara stated that flotillas must carry humanitarian aid and not weapons. He said that Israel wanted to work with Turkey to transfer humanitarian aid to Gaza.

=== Iran ===
Kara supports an Israeli strike against Iran's nuclear program and assured that other Muslim nations would support a strike, albeit quietly, and not publicly. He claimed in April 2010 that he had been approached by an Israeli woman of Persian origin, who had been contacted by an Iranian nuclear scientist seeking asylum in Israel. Kara stated he would help, and that the scientist was staying in a "friendly country", but there has been no word on the plan since the announcement.

Following a planned visit by Iranian president Mahmoud Ahmadinejad to the Israel-Lebanon border, Kara organized a rally in which 2,000 blue and white balloons would be released if Ahmadinejad came, stating that "the balloons represent the fact that the Jewish people have come home after 2,000 years of exile, and are not going anywhere". Kara also stated that as a non-Jew, he appreciated Israel's freedom and democracy, and that were it not for the Jewish people, the entire region would look like Iran. Kara also claims to have sent Ahmadinejad a letter in Persian, in which he expressed "the Israeli nation's desire for peace, and its willingness to defend itself". At the event, Kara criticized the Israeli government for inaction, and called Ahmadinejad "a catastrophe for the world" and said that Israel wants peace, not wars. He also warned that Ahmadinejad intends to rebuild the Persian Empire, using Lebanon as an army base.

=== Settlements ===
A staunch supporter of Jewish settlement in the West Bank and Gaza Strip, Kara spoke at a ceremony marking the end of the settlement freeze. He criticizing it as not helpful to Israel or the Palestinian Authority and said that the August 2010 West Bank shooting attack of four Israelis near Kiryat Arba shows that the freeze only serves as "appeasement" and is not working. At an event marking the construction of a new building in the West Bank, Kara stated: "The expulsion of Jews from Gush Katif brought zero results, the expulsion of the Israeli army from Lebanon has brought zero results, and the construction freeze brought zero results."

Kara attended an Israeli version of the American tea party protests with other Likud MKs and members. Speakers at the event called on Obama to stop pressuring Netanyahu, and for the prime minister to stand his ground and uphold Jewish rights and values. Kara attended a rally in 2010 marking the end of the construction slow down in Revava, that was also attended by hundreds of Christian supporters of Israel. He welcomed the tourists saying: "I say to all the non-Jews who are here, I too am not a Jew, but in spirit I am most Jewish, I am most Zionist, and so are you! Good for you that you are here to support Israel." However, he, along with other Likud MKs, was absent from a vote in 2011 brought by National Union MKs that would extend sovereignty to Jewish settlements in the West Bank.

=== United States ===
Kara warned Israel in July 2010 not to be tricked by United States president Barack Obama's apparent sympathy for Israel. Kara stated that Obama "doesn't sound evil now because he needs Jewish votes and money, but I won't forget the pressure he put on Netanyahu and the stress I saw in the prime minister the last time he came back from Washington".

Following the Unite the Right rally in Charlottesville, Virginia, Kara defended U.S. President Donald Trump's response to the protest, which received much criticism, including from some in Israel. Kara stated relations with Trump were more important, stating "due to the terrific relations with the US, we need to put the declarations about the Nazis in the proper proportion." Kara also described the Obama administration as "terrible".

== See also ==
- Sarhan Bader
- Hamad Amar
- List of Israeli Druze

Legal offices
Preceded by Taleb el-Sana	Chairman of the Committee on Drug Abuse; 2003–2004	Succeeded by Yair Peretz
