= Eduard Meron =

Israeli weightlifter (born 1938)

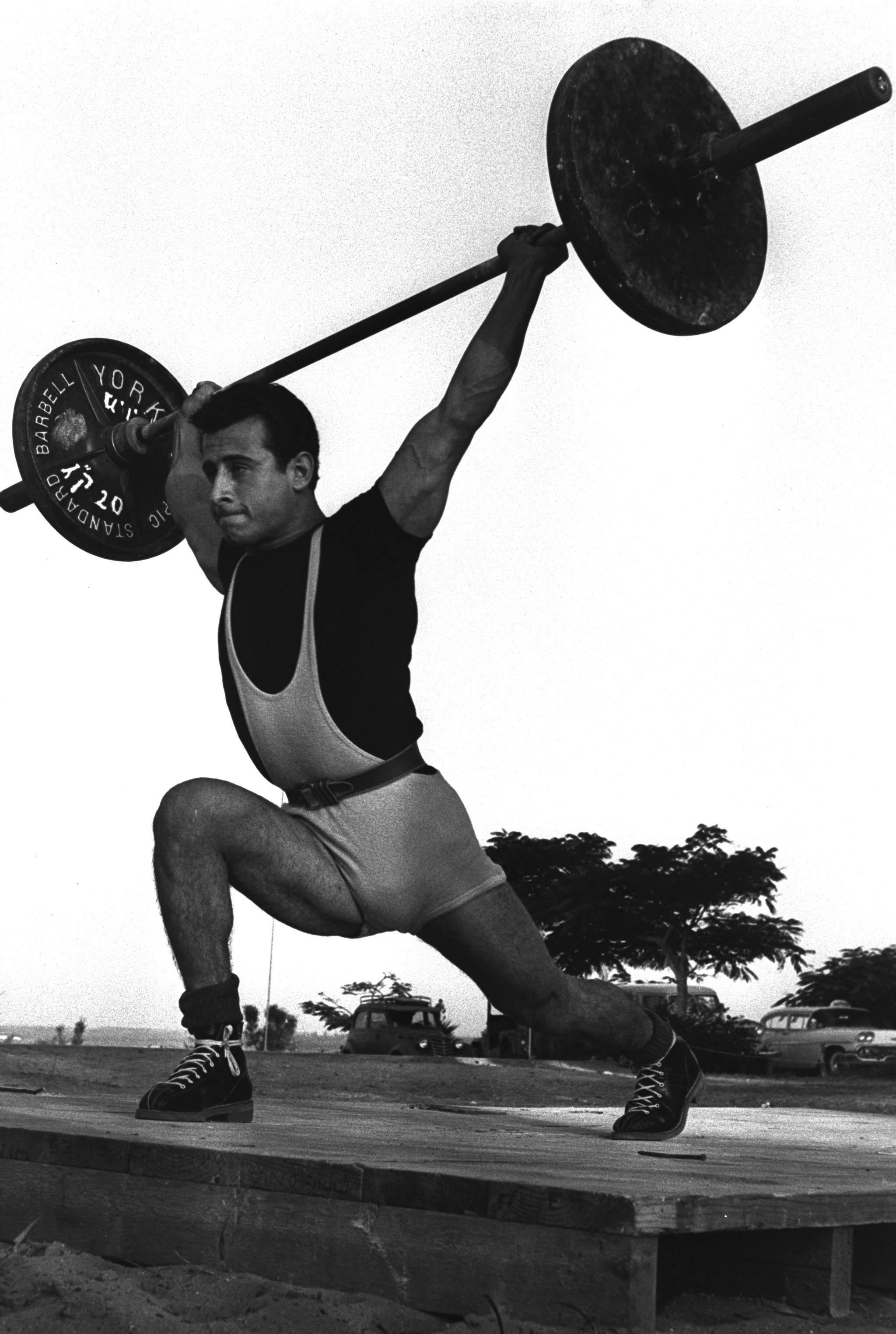
- Eduard Meron (1960)

Personal information
- Native name: إدوارد موارن
- Born: 1938 (age 86–87) Haifa, Mandatory Palestine (now Israel)
- Height: 5 ft 4.5 in (164 cm)
- Weight: 123 lb (56 kg)

Sport
- Country: Israel
- Sport: Weightlifting
- Weight class: Bantamweight

Eduard Meron (or Edward Maron; Arabic: إدوارد موارن, Hebrew: אדוארד מרון; born 1938) is an Arab-Israeli former Olympic weightlifter.

== Personal life ==
He was born in Haifa, Mandatory Palestine. Meron is an Arab-Israeli Maronite Christian, and of Lebanese descent.

== Weightlifting career ==
Meron competed for Israel at the 1960 Summer Olympics in Rome, Italy, in Weightlifting--Men's Bantamweight. He came in 18th, after lifting a total of 270 kg in his best lifts in military press, snatch, and clean & jerk. When he competed in the Olympics he was 5 ft 4.5 in (1.64 m) tall, and weighed 123 lb (56 kg).

Meron marched with the Israeli flag at the 1960 Summer Olympics opening ceremony.

He competed in the 1961 Maccabiah Games in Tel Aviv, Israel, and won a silver medal in the featherweight category.

He said in 2012 that he was certain that Israeli Olympic representation, which has seen few Arabs, is determined only according to criteria: "There’s a minimum you have to meet, and if Arab athletes didn’t meet the minimum, that means that they weren’t good enough."

== See also ==
- Adam Maraana, Arab-Israeli swimmer
- Rifaat Turk, Arab-Israeli Olympic footballer
- Iyad Shalabi, Arab-Israeli Paralympic swimmer
