= Red Front =

Red Front may refer to:

- Rotfrontkämpferbund (Red Front Fighters' League), a paramilitary organization associated with KPD
- Red Front (UK), a socialist electoral coalition which stood candidates in the 1987 UK general election
- Red Front of Tamil Eelamists, one of Sri Lankan Tamil militant groups
- Revolutionary Communist alliance - Red Front, a splinter offshoot of Ma'avak
- Red Front (Czerwony Front), a Polish Trotskyist organization, and the Polish section of Revolutionary Communist International

See also Rot Front (disambiguation)
