= Nora Shanab =

Israeli footballer (born 1987)

Nora Abu Shanab نورة أبو شنب
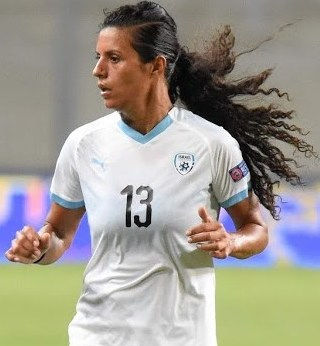

Personal information
- Date of birth: 9 December 1987 (age 38)
- Position: Defender

International career^{‡}
Years	Team	Apps	(Gls)
2011–	Israel	13	(0)
- ‡ National team caps and goals as of 6 December 2021

Nora Abu Shanab (or Noura Abo Shanab, Arabic: نورة أبو شنب, Hebrew: נורה אבו שנב; born 9 December 1987) is an Israeli footballer who plays as a defender and has appeared for the Israel women's national team.

== International career ==
Shanab has been capped for the Israel national team, appearing for the team during the 2019 FIFA Women's World Cup qualifying cycle.

== Personal life ==
Shanab is ethnically Arab.
