= Hossam Haick =

- حسام حايك
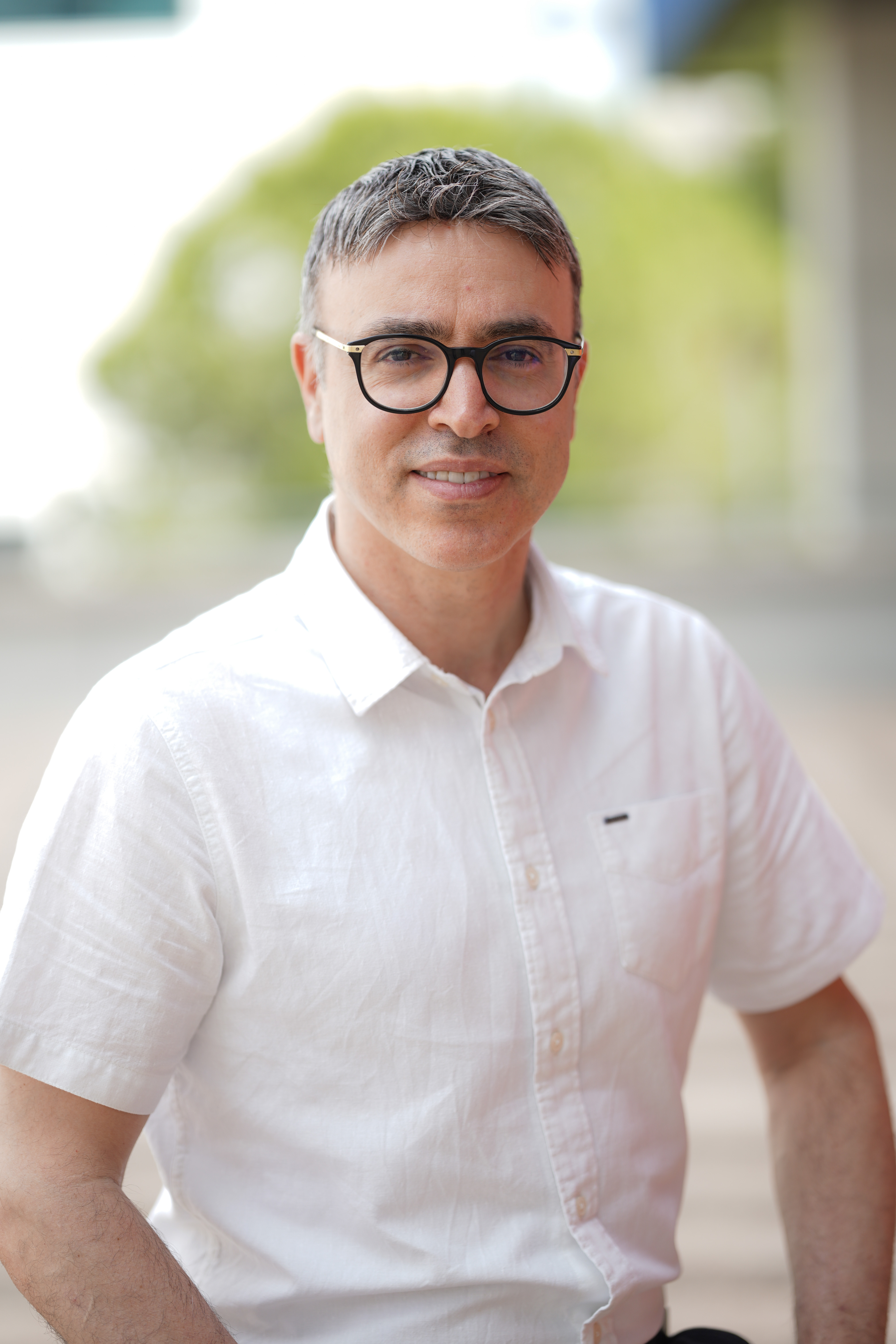
- Born: 1975 (age 50–51); Nazareth, Israel
- Education: Ben-Gurion University; Technion; Weizmann Institute of Science; Caltech
- Known for: Na-Nose
- Awards: NAI Fellow (2026); Israeli Presidential Medal of Honour (2026); MRS Impact Award (2025); EU Innovation Prize (2018); "Michael Bruno" Award (2018); Humboldt Senior Research Award (2016); Knight of the Order of Academic Palms (2010); MIT Technology Review TR35 (2008)
- Scientific career
- Fields: Nanoscience; Nanotechnology; Molecular electronics
- Workplaces: Russell Berrie Nanotechnology Institute, Technion

Hossam Haick (Arabic: حسام حايك; Hebrew: חוסאם חאיק; /haɪk/ HYKE born 1975) is an Arab-Israeli scientist and engineer, who is a Full Professor at the Technion – Israel Institute of Technology. He is known for his research in nanotechnology and non-invasive disease diagnostics, particularly for developing artificially intelligent sensory technologies, including the Nano Artificial Nose (NA-NOSE) and the A-Patch. These platforms are designed to detect disease-related biomarkers from non-invasive biological sources, including exhaled breath and the skin.

In 2026, Haick was awarded the Israeli Presidential Medal of Honour and became a Fellow of the United States National Academy of Inventors. He has published more than 500 scientific publications and holds more than 100 patents, many of which have been licensed to international companies. His work has received more than 37,000 citations on Google Scholar, with an h-index of 100.

His research has been supported by major competitive grants and awards, including the Marie Curie Excellence Grant, grants from the European Research Council (ERC), and the Bill & Melinda Gates Foundation Awards. He was appointed a Knight of the Order of Academic Palms by the French government in 2010 and was included in the GOOD 100 list of global citizens and creative change-makers from 2015 to 2018 and 35 Top Young Inventors (TR35) by MIT Technology Review as well as in additional >90 international scientific rankings, including Stanford University's list of the world's top 2% most-cited scientists from 2021 to 2026. He served as Dean of the School of Undergraduate Studies at the Technion from 2020 to 2026.

== Early life and education ==
Haick was born in 1975 in Nazareth, Israel, into an Arab Christian family. He attended St. Joseph Seminary and High School in Nazareth. He received his B.Sc. in Chemical Engineering from Ben-Gurion University in 1998, and his Ph.D. from the Technion – Israel Institute of Technology in 2002. He completed postdoctoral fellowships at the Weizmann Institute of Science (2002–2004) and at the California Institute of Technology (Caltech) (2004–2006).

== Career ==
Haick joined the Technion faculty in 2006 as an Assistant Professor in the Wolfson Faculty of Chemical Engineering. He was promoted to Associate Professor with tenure in 2010, and to Full Professor in 2013 in Chemical Engineering. From 2007 to 2011, he headed the Marie-Curie Excellence Centre for Nanomaterial-Based Artificial Olfactory Systems at the Technion. He received a secondary appointment as Full Professor in Biomedical Engineering in 2019. He served as Dean of the School of Undergraduate Studies from 2020 to 2026. He held visiting positions as Guest Professor at Ningbo University in China (2017–2020), Visiting Professor at the Max Planck Institute for Polymer Research in Mainz (2016–2017), and Co-director of the International Associated Laboratory between INSERM, Université Paris-Sud, and the Technion (2013–2022).

Haick has founded and coordinated multiple major European research consortia. He founded and coordinated VOLGACORE under the ERA-NET EuroNanoMed-II programme (2013–2017), focused on volatile biomarkers for early detection and characterisation of gastric and colorectal neoplasms. He founded and coordinated the LCAOS consortium under the EU's FP7 Health programme (2011–2015). He founded and coordinated the SniffPhone project, an EU Horizon 2020 initiative (2015–2019) that developed a smartphone-attachable device for non-invasive breath-based disease detection, partnering with institutions across five countries. In 2018, SniffPhone received the European Commission Innovation Prize at EFECS in Lisbon. He also founded and coordinated VOGAS under the EU's Horizon 2020 CELAC programme (2019–2023), and the A-Patch consortium, also under EU Horizon 2020 (2019–2023), developing wearable sensing patches for infectious disease detection. In 2023, he founded and began coordinating the LUCIA consortium under Horizon Europe's EU Cancer Mission. Since 2025, he has founded and coordinated VOLABIOS, a Horizon Europe Health Programme consortium. His most recent consortium, CLARITY-PD, assembles an international consortium of 28 partnering entities from six EU countries and three associated countries to advance non-invasive diagnosis of Parkinson's disease. In total, he has founded and coordinated eight EU consortia, each comprising 17–42 partners from academia, industry, and the public sector, and has served as a core partner in five additional EU consortia.

Haick is a co-founder of five companies that emerged from academic research, including Nanose Medical Ltd, where he has served as Co-founder and Chief Scientific Officer since 2019; and FeelIT Ltd, where he has been Co-founder since 2017.

== Research ==
Haick's research focuses on the development of nanosensor-based artificial sensing systems for the non-invasive and minimally invasive detection and diagnosis of disease. His work explores disease-related biomarkers from a wide range of biological sources, including exhaled breath, skin, blood, body fluids, and tissue samples, with particular emphasis on extracting diagnostic information without the need for conventional invasive procedures. His group developed the Nano Artificial Nose (NA-NOSE), a nanomaterial-based sensing platform designed to identify disease-specific molecular signatures and enable the detection of conditions such as cancer, Parkinson's disease, and other disorders. His 2009 paper in Nature Nanotechnology demonstrated the diagnosis of lung cancer from exhaled breath using gold-nanoparticle sensor arrays and helped establish the concept of breath-based disease detection. In subsequent large-scale clinical studies, his group provided evidence that different diseases generate distinct and characteristic patterns – or “fingerprints” – of volatile organic compounds (VOCs) in exhaled breath. The demonstration of disease-specific volatile fingerprints across 17 different diseases represented a major milestone in the development of volatilomics and provided a foundation for using volatile molecular patterns for non-invasive disease detection and classification.

== Publications and patents ==
Haick has published more than 500 scientific publications in top-level journals across his career, including more than 300 in the past decade, in the fields of nanotechnology, advanced materials, chemistry, and medicine. He has edited two books and more than ten book chapters. His work has been cited more than 37,000 times on Google Scholar, with an h-index of 100. In 2022, he edited Volatile Biomarkers for Human Health: From Nature to Artificial Senses, published by the Royal Society of Chemistry, which examines volatile biomarkers and their use in artificial sensing systems for health-related applications. In 2024, he edited Nature-Inspired Sensors, published by Elsevier, which addresses sensing technologies and concepts inspired by biological and natural systems.

== Books ==
Haick, Hossam, ed. (2022). Volatile Biomarkers for Human Health: From Nature to Artificial Senses. Cambridge: Royal Society of Chemistry. 502 pp. ISBN 978-1-83916-430-9.

Haick, Hossam, ed. (2024). Nature-Inspired Sensors. Amsterdam: Elsevier. ISBN 978-0-443-15684-7. doi:10.1016/C2022-0-01670-6.
