= Toufik Mansour =

Israeli mathematician (born 1968)

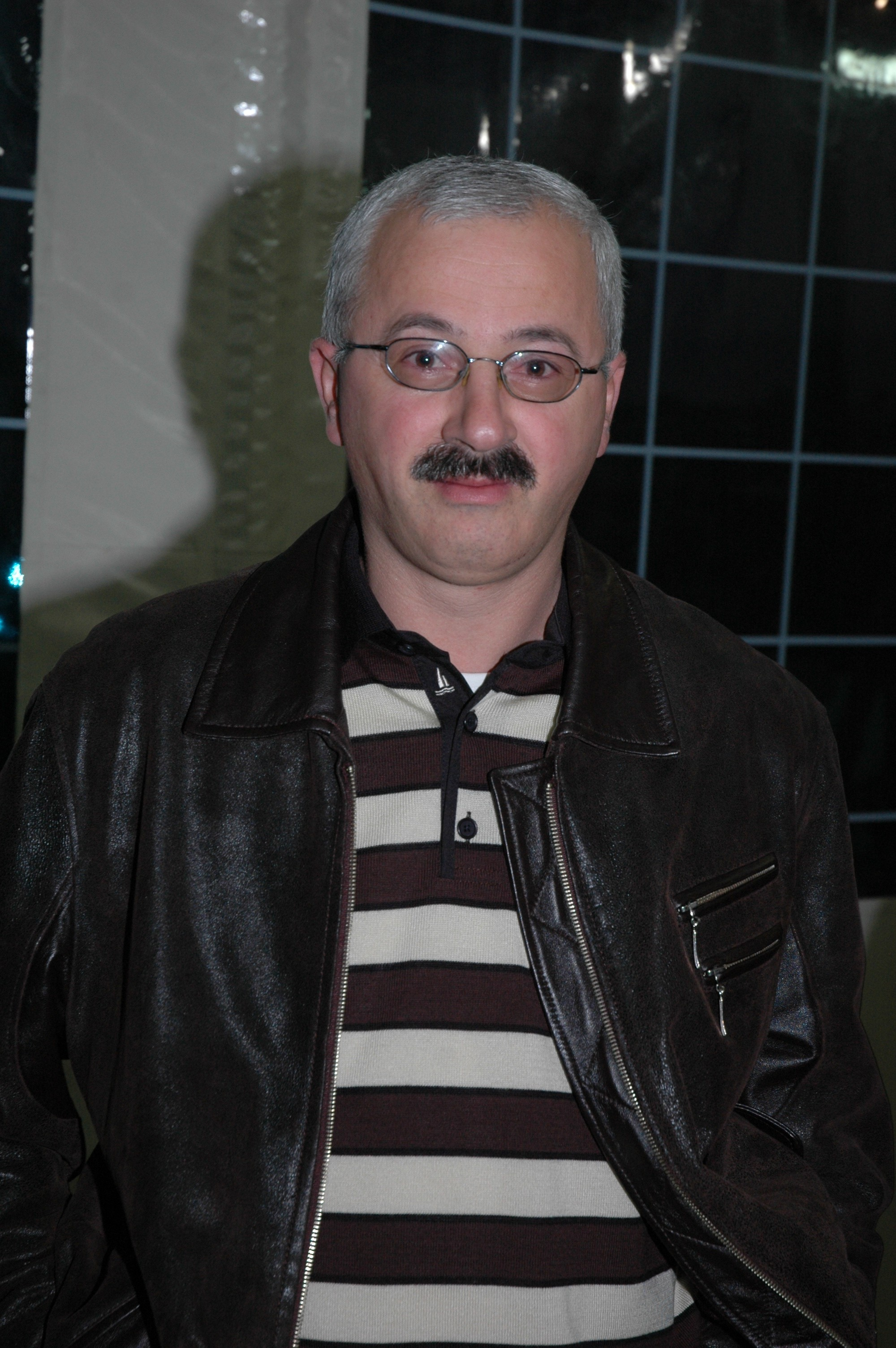
- Born: 17 January 1968
- Scientific career
- Fields: Mathematician

Toufik Mansour is an Israeli mathematician working in algebraic combinatorics. He is a member of the Druze community and is the first Israeli Druze to become a professional mathematician.

Mansour obtained his Ph.D. in mathematics from the University of Haifa in 2001 under Alek Vainshtein. As of 2007, he is a professor of mathematics at the University of Haifa. He served as chair of the department from 2015 to 2017. He has previously been a faculty member of the Center for Combinatorics at Nankai University from 2004 to 2007, and at The John Knopfmacher Center for Applicable Analysis and Number Theory at the University of the Witwatersrand.

Mansour is an expert on Discrete Mathematics and its applications. In particular, he is interested in permutation patterns, colored permutations, set partitions, combinatorics on words, and compositions. He has published extensively in these areas.

Mansour is a founding editor of the peer-reviewed journal Enumerative Combinatorics and Applications and has served as its editor-in-chief since the journal’s establishment.

Since 2022, he has chaired and organized the annual International Conference on Enumerative Combinatorics and Applications.

== Books ==
- Heubach, Silvia; Mansour, Toufik (2010), Combinatorics of Compositions and Words, Discrete Mathematics and its Applications, Boca Raton, Florida: CRC Press, ISBN 978-1-4200-7267-9, MR 2531482.
- Mansour, Toufik (2013), Combinatorics of Set Partitions, Discrete Mathematics and its Applications, Boca Raton, Florida: CRC Press, ISBN 978-1-4398-6333-6, MR 2953184.
- Mansour, Toufik; Schork, Matthias (2015), Commutation Relations, Normal Ordering, and Stirling Numbers, Discrete Mathematics and its Applications, Boca Raton, Florida: CRC Press, ISBN 978-1-4665-7988-0.

== See also ==
- List of Israeli Druze
- Schröder–Hipparchus number
