= Suleiman Maswadeh =

Arab-Israeli reporter and political anchor

- سليمان مسودة
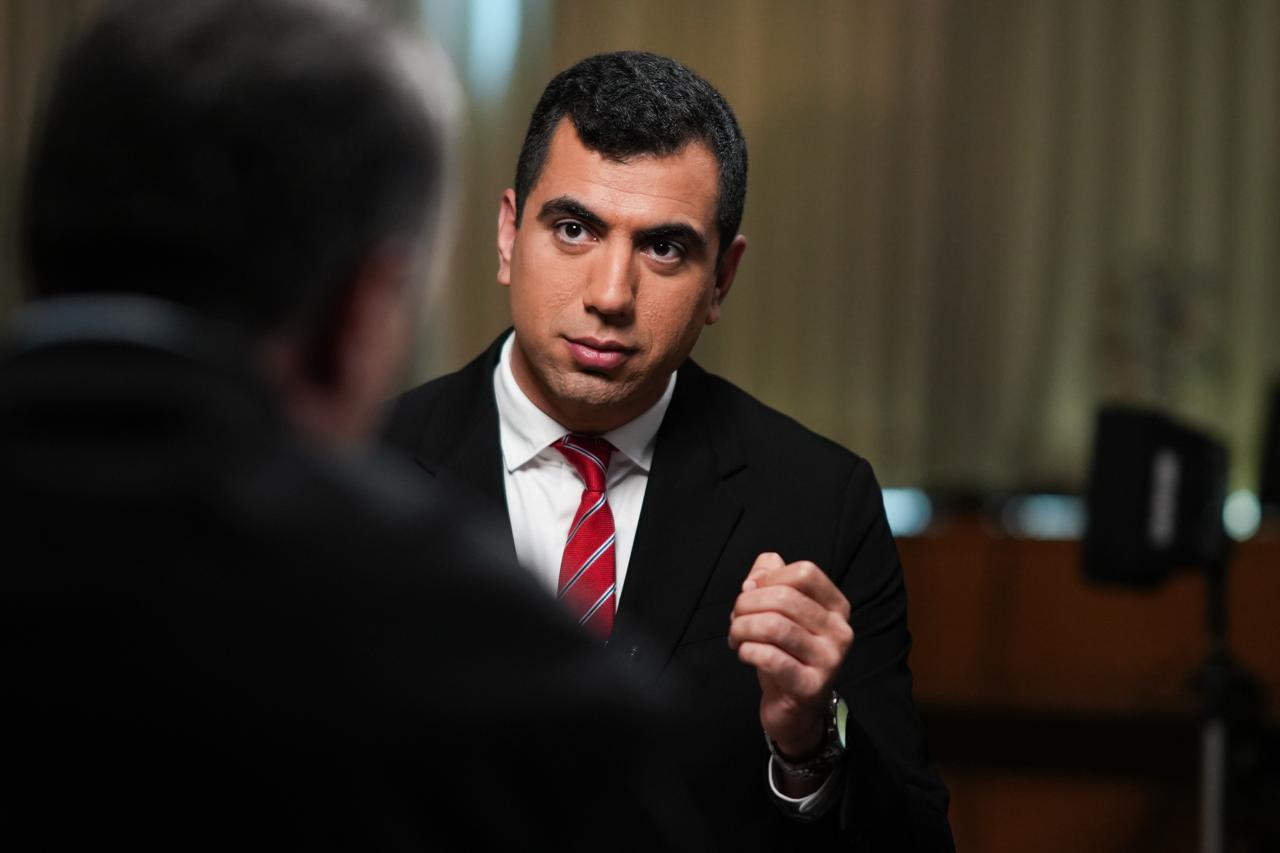
- Maswadeah in 2026
- Born: July 13, 1995 (age 31); Muslim Quarter, Old City of Jerusalem, East Jerusalem
- Education: Hadassah Academic College
- Occupations: Journalist, news reporter
- Years active: 2019–present
- Employer: Israeli Public Broadcasting Corporation

Suleiman Maswadeh (Arabic: سليمان مسودة; born July 13, 1995) is a Palestinian-Israeli journalist, currently the senior Hebrew-language political reporter for the Israeli Public Broadcasting Corporation.

== Biography ==
Suleiman Maswadeh was born and raised in the Muslim Quarter in the Old City of Jerusalem. His father, Monzer Maswadeh, is a truckdriver, and his mother, Iman, is a homemaker. He has six younger sisters. He attended "Al-Iman" High school.

He studied accounting at Birzeit University in the Palestinian town of Birzeit. While attending college, he worked at a hotel in Jerusalem and realized that workers who spoke Hebrew made better tips. After two years, he decided to drop out of Birzeit, and enrolled in a year-long intensive Hebrew language program.

Upon completion of the Hebrew language program, Maswadeh earned a scholarship for Jerusalem's Hadassah Academic College, where he studied in the Politics and Communication Department. During his studies, he found a job at the Israeli television channel Kan 11.

== Journalism career ==
Maswadeh first became interested in journalism during the Second Intifada in the early 2000s.

While studying at Hadassah Academic College, Maswadeh had an internship at Kan 11's Arabic channel. After a few months, he was transferred to the Hebrew channel, where he worked as a field producer and later as an Arab affairs reporter, a role he disliked. He then worked as the channel's Jerusalem correspondent, where he reported on both Arab and Jewish affairs.

In 2023, Maswadeh was promoted to political correspondent and anchor for Kan 11, and moved to Tel Aviv to work there. Later that year, Maswadeh received a "special award of excellence" from Hadassah Academic College for his journalistic career. He also works as a radio journalist for Reshet Bet.

Maswadeh has said he experiences some pressure from his family and community, especially when his reporting does not reflect the Palestinian community positively; for example, in 2020, Maswadeh reported on COVID-19 restriction violations at the Al-Aqsa complex. He has also reported receiving death threats.

== Personal life ==
Maswadeh became an Israeli citizen in February 2024, after having repeatedly applied over a period of eight years. Up to that point, as an East Jerusalem Palestinian he had the legal status of a "permanent resident" holding an Israeli identity card along with a Jordanian passport.

As of 2024, Maswadeh resides in Tel Aviv, with his partner, Tamar.
