= Sarhan Bader =

Israeli Arab political activist

- سرحان بدر
- Born: 1975 (age 50–51); Nahf, Israel
- Occupation: Political activist
- Political party: Likud (former)

Sarhan Bader (Arabic: سرحان بدر, Hebrew: סרחאן בדר; born 1975 or 1976) is an Israeli Arab political activist.

== Biography ==
Bader lives in Nahf, an Arab town in the Upper Galilee.

== Political career ==
Bader had been a member of Likud, but was criticized by fellow Arabs. He decided that a Zionist Arab party was needed to speak for Israeli Arabs who support Israel and counter the existing Arab parties: United Arab List-Ta'al, Balad, and Hadash. He said he will work to improve the condition of Israeli Arabs by joining the governing coalition after the next Israeli legislative election. The party has a working title of Israeli-Arab Nationalist Party and is expected to take six months to organize.

Atef Qrenawi of Rahat, a member of the Likud Central Committee also announced plans for an Arab Zionist party. The party will focus on Arab issues, as opposed to the foreign policy focus of the main Arab parties.

== See also ==
- Ayoob Kara
