= Elham Dwairy Tabry =

Israeli author (born 1947)

- الهام دويري تابري
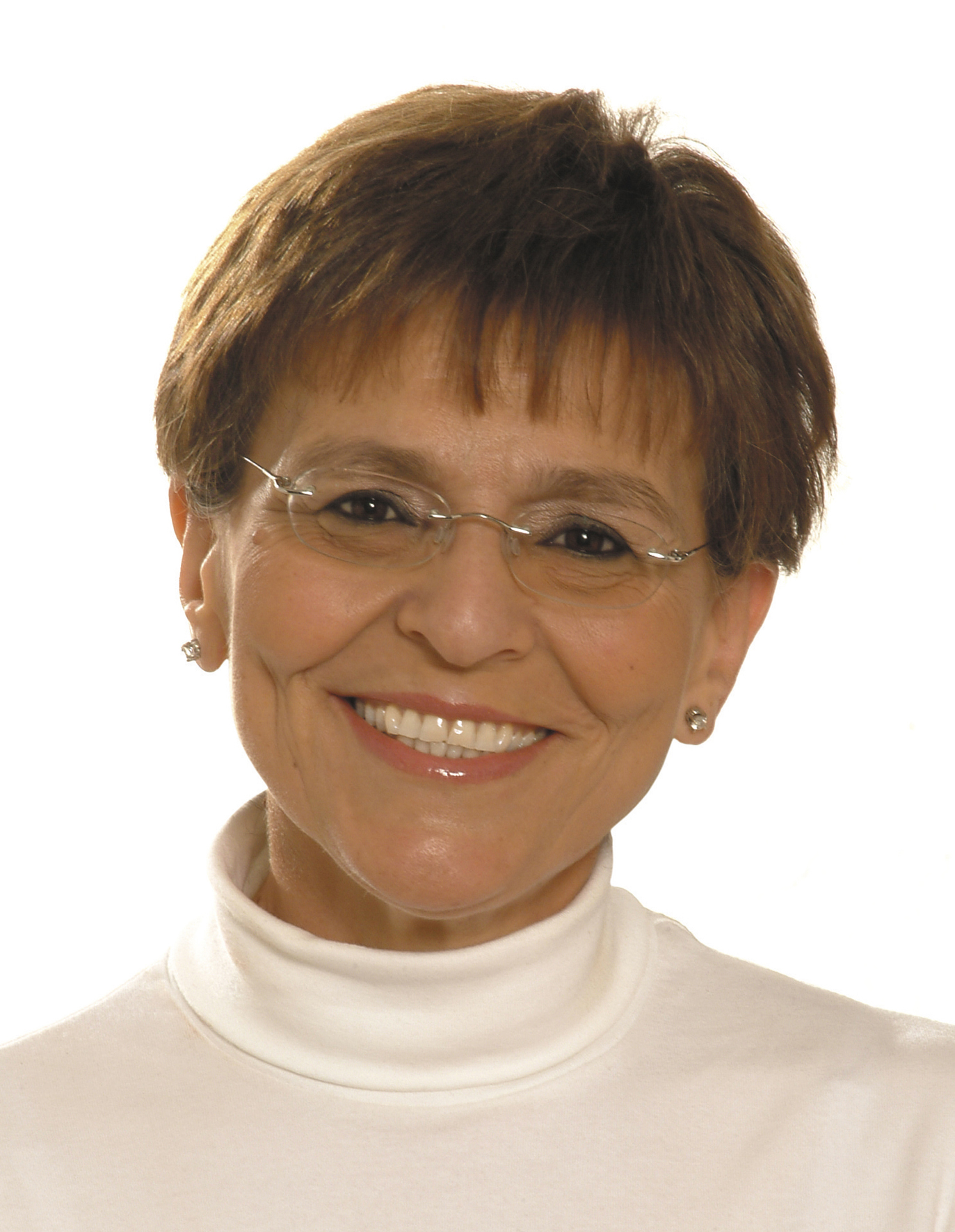
- Elham Dwairy Tabry (2004)
- Born: 1947 (age 78–79); Nazareth, Israel
- Occupation: Author

Elham Dwairy Tabry (Arabic: الهام دويري تابري, Hebrew: אלהאם דאווירי תאברי; born 11 January 1947) is an Arab Palestinian author and citizen of Israel.

== Early life ==
Elham Dwairy Tabry was born in Nazareth in 1947. She is the third child of five in a conservative Arab family. Her parents are building engineer Adeeb Dahdouh Dwairy and housewife Loris Iskandar Kawar.

She attended the Fransciscan school in Nazareth, which was a girls-only school at the time. As a child, she read books regularly and borrowed books from her uncle, poet Dr. Jamal Kawar. At that time no public libraries operated near Nazareth.

In 1972, she earned a teaching certificate in a project established by the Ministry of Education in Nazareth. In 1986, she earned a teaching certificate (senior teacher) for teaching English in the junior high. Dwairy Tabry graduated in 1989 with a BA in Education and Arabic Language at the University of Haifa. In 1995, she studied Bibliotherapy in Oranim Academic College and earned her master's degree in Education at the Loughborough University in England.

Elham Dwairy Tabry is married to Edwar Tabry, an engineer, and is the mother of three. Her children and her husband helped her in writing. Her husband and daughter Sawsan proofread, her daughter Faten illustrated her first books and her son Kamal illustrated the Qushqush series and other books.

== Career ==
Dwairy Tabry worked as a teacher between 1972 and 1997. She began writing articles on education in 1994 while working as a teacher and coordinator. She began writing articles for the newspaper Kul al-Arab, when poet Samih al-Qasim was its editor-in-chief. She has written about education in other newspapers, magazines and Internet websites, including Al Mawakeb Magazine, Lady Magazine, Bukra website and Sonara newspaper.

=== Writing ===
Her first book, Albaida, was published in 1994. As of 2020, she has written and published 62 children's books, nine books for teenagers and two professional books on education. She created the Firas, Hana and Qushqush series. Her books are published by Dar Al-Elham Publishing, which she established. As of 2009, shows with the character "Qushqush" had been presented in kindergartens and elementary schools, community centers, and theater stages, in Israel and the Palestinian National Authority. Dwairy Tabry directed and wrote the texts and the songs for the plays. She developed mind games using Qushqush's character.

In 2004, she won the Literary Work Award in Arabic Literature conferred by the Israeli Ministry of Education, Culture and Sport.

In November 2015, under the initiative of the Nazareth Municipality and the Nazareth Children's Theater Festival, an evening tribute was held for Dwairy Tabry "for her great educational and literary role and for her contribution for children, parents and society as a whole, and in particular from the Qushqush series that was derived from her books". Throughout the festival an exhibition was held that presented illustrations from Qushqush books, in addition to illustrations from her other books. The "Qushqush" character she created became the most popular children's figure in the Arab sector in Israel.

Her books were selected for the Israeli Ministry of Education's Book charts in 2010, 2012, 2016 and in 2019.

In November 2019 Qushqush book illustrations were presented over ten days within the Tel Aviv-Yafo Illustrations Week exhibitions Of the Department of the Arts in the Tel Aviv-Yafo Municipality.

She wrote scripts for the TV show Amal Haritna (Amal Of Our Neighborhood), which was broadcast by Israeli Educational Television. As of May 2017, she held a permanent position as an expert guest on education on the Israeli Public Broadcasting Corporation radio program Makan Station. She talks about education and answers parents' questions on a live broadcast.

=== Educator ===
She lectures at Colleges about Early Childhood Education. She taught in Oranim Academic College and Open University of Israel. She holds guest lectures at academic institutions in Israel and the Palestinian National Authority.

== Works ==
Her books appeal to children from preschoolers to teenagers. In addition, she wrote therapeutic books for youth that she also illustrated.

The Firas series is about a kid named Firas. Some of the series books are legacy stories and some deal with Firas' everyday experiences. The Hana series is about a baby named Hana, targeted for early childhood. The purpose of the series is to care for and nurture the emotional, thought and feeling side of infants.

Qushqush is a hero of Elham's books. The name "Qushqush" is a fictional name, and was chosen to prevent the teasing of children with such a name. The character is similar to all children: it is funny, not ideal, playful and curious. She also used Qushqush's character through activities in booklets whose purpose is to develop the emotional-intellectual side of the child.

Dwairy Tabry wrote her autobiography The Seller of the Lilies and Flowers, which included 10 short stories, eight of which were autobiographical. She produced five other therapeutic books for youth and adults, which she illustrated.

Dwairy Tabry has written books that incorporate topics such as gender roles and the Arab family's attitude to modernization and tradition.

She wrote about death, divorce, bullying, abuse, and physical abuse for children. She wrote two books addressing sexual awareness, sexual abuse, and pedophilia, a topic considered taboo in Arab society. For example, the books The Body of Qushqush, published in 2001, and the book Qushqush the Guardian of the Castle, published in 2008, that discussed it. She wrote a book explaining to children how they came into the world, in Qushqush asks: How was I born? This book also deals with a topic that was not discussed in children's books in the Arab world at the time.

According to the book Studies in local children's literature few books discuss the sexual abuse of children in Israel. It noted Qushqush's body and Qushqush the Guardian of the Castle. It was noted in the study that other books lacked illustrations dealing with the subject. According to the study, Elham invented a character similar to every child in its behavior, which is why her books are loved by children and educators.

The stories are characterized by the illustrations and production, her writing in rhymes, the happy ending with a song at the end of each story, short sentences, the emotional expressions and phrasing of sentences according to a child's way of speaking. These techniques make it easier for the child to relate to the text and to the characters.
