= Hamad Abu Rabia =

Bedouin Israeli politician (1929–1981)

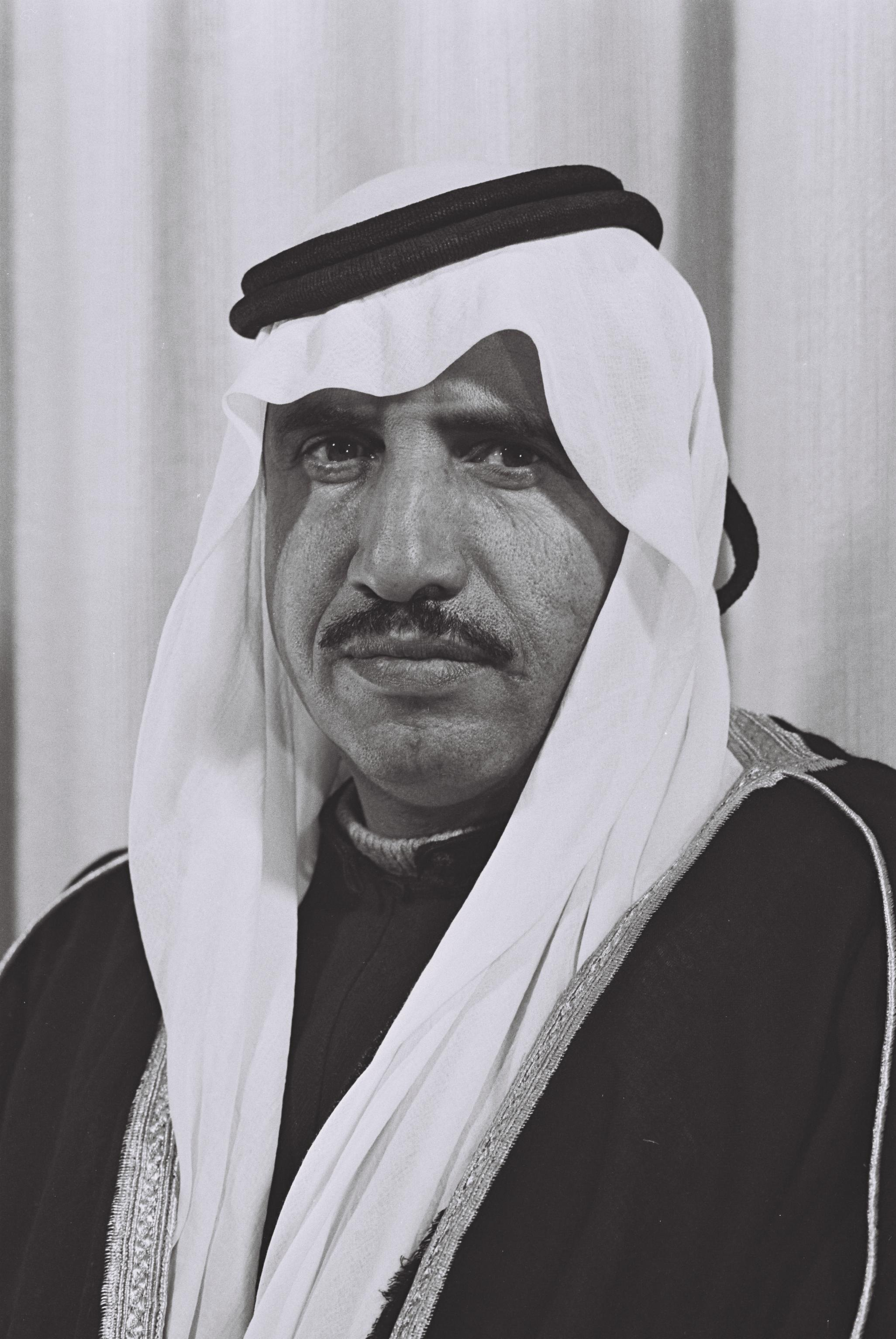
- Abu Rabia in 1974

Faction represented in the Knesset
- 1974: Arab List for Bedouin and Villagers
- 1974–1976: Alignment
- 1976–1977: Arab List for Bedouin and Villagers
- 1977–1981: United Arab List

Personal details
- Born: 1929 Negev, Mandatory Palestine
- Died: 12 January 1981 (aged 51–52) Jerusalem

Sheikh Hamad Abu Rabia (Arabic: حماد أبو ربيعة, Hebrew: חמאד אבו-רביעה; 1929 – 12 January 1981) was a Bedouin Israeli politician and a member of the Knesset.

== Biography ==
Abu Rabia was born and grew up in the Negev, where he attended elementary school. He attended high school in Hebron. At the age of 18 he became sheikh of his tribe and took interest in fostering its education.

Abu Rabia was first elected to the Knesset in 1973 on the Arab List for Bedouin and Villagers, becoming the first Bedouin to serve in the Knesset. In 1974 the party joined the Alignment, but broke away again in 1976. The following year it merged into the original United Arab List. He was re-elected in the 1977 elections, and became a member of the Committee for Public Services.

The United Arab List had won a single seat, which Abu Rabia and Jabr Muadi had agreed to rotate. However, Abu Rabia refused to vacate his seat, with a court ruling that the agreement was invalid. On 12 January 1981 Abu Rabia was assassinated outside a hotel in Jerusalem by Muadi's sons. Despite the family links to the killing, Muadi replaced Abu Rabia in the Knesset.
