= Abdel Rahman Zuabi =

Retired Israeli judge

- عبد الرحمن زعبي
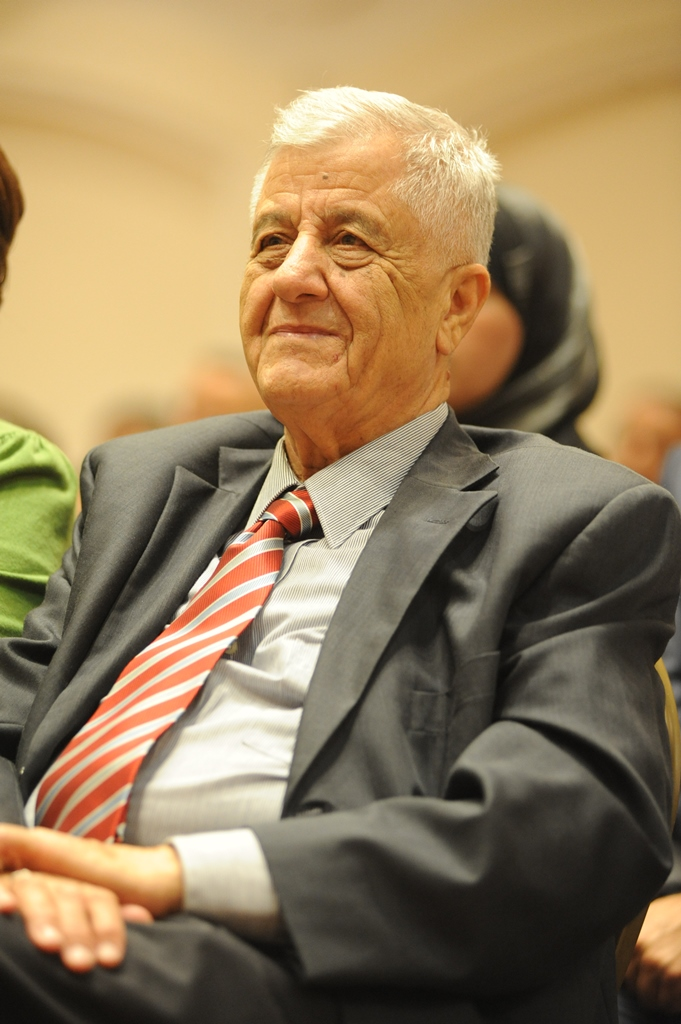

Supreme Court of Israel
- In office March 3, 1999 – December 1999

Personal details
- Born: 19 November 1932 Sulam, Mandatory Palestine
- Died: 12 September 2014 (aged 81)
- Education: Tel Aviv School of Law and Economics
- Profession: Lawyer, judge

Abdel Rahman Zuabi (Arabic: عبد الرحمن زعبي, Hebrew: עבד אלרחמן זועבי; November 19, 1932 – September 12, 2014) (also Abd-er-Rahman Zoabi) was an Israeli Arab judge. In 1999, he served as an Israeli Supreme Court justice.

== Biography ==
Abdel Rahman Zuabi was born in Sulam, a village in northern Israel near Afula. He studied law at the Tel Aviv School of Law and Economics (which would later become the law faculty of Tel Aviv University and completed his studies in 1958, becoming the first Arab to graduate from the institution. He was granted a license to practice law in 1960 and joined the law office of Moshe Amar. He worked as a lawyer in Haifa and Nazareth until 1978, when he was appointed a judge on the Nazareth District Court. He was a member of the Shamgar Commission, which investigated the 1994 Cave of the Patriarchs massacre in 1994.

In 1996, Zuabi was appointed deputy chief of the Nazareth District Court in 1996 and served in this position until 2002. On March 3, 1999, he was appointed to the Supreme Court of Israel for a nine-month term, becoming the first Arab justice to serve on the court. After his term ended, he returned to the Nazareth District Court until his retirement.

== See also ==
- Salim Jubran
- George Karra
- Zoubi family
