= George Karra =

Justice of the Supreme Court of Israel

- جورج القرا
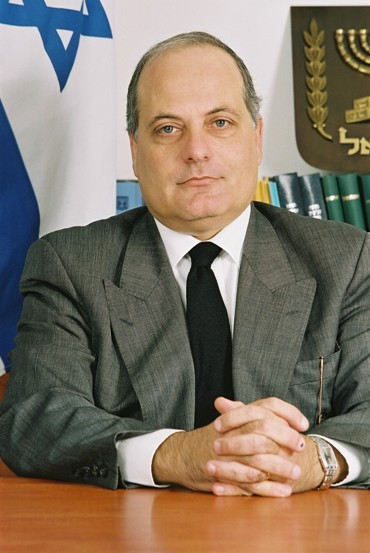

Justice of the Supreme Court of Israel
- In office February 2017 – 2022

Personal details
- Born: 29 May 1952 (age 74) Jaffa, Israel
- Children: 3
- Education: Tel Aviv University
- Profession: Lawyer, judge

George Karra (Arabic: جورج القرا, Hebrew: ג׳וֹרְג׳ קָרָא; born 29 May 1952) is an Israeli jurist who served as a judge on the Supreme Court of Israel.

== Biography ==
George Karra was born to one of the most distinguished Arab Christian families in Jaffa, one of four children. He has three daughters. Karra studied at Terra Sancta primary school and Eshkolot high school in Jaffa. In 1973, he completed his law degree at Tel Aviv University, and opened his own law office in 1975.

Karra was in private practice until 1989, when he was appointed a judge on the Tel Aviv Magistrate’s Court. After 11 years, he was promoted to the Tel Aviv District Court. He was appointed a senior court judge in 2010. Karra was the judge who convicted Israeli President Moshe Katsav of rape. In another high-profile case, he convicted Ofer Nimrodi of illegal wiretapping.

In 2011, he was nominated as a candidate for the Supreme Court of Israel. In February 2017, he was appointed to serve as a judge on the Supreme Court.

Karra left the Supreme Court in 2022, having reached the mandatory retirement age of 70.
