= Abbas Suan =

Israeli footballer

Abbas Suan عباس صوان
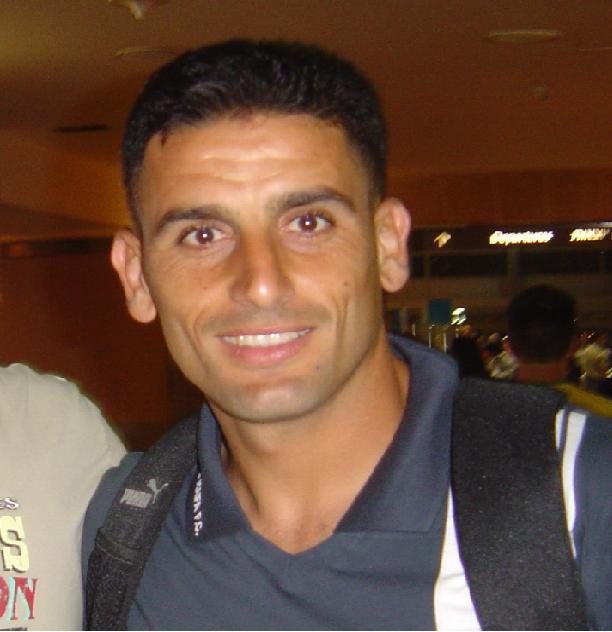

Personal information
- Date of birth: January 27, 1976 (age 50)
- Place of birth: Sakhnin, Israel
- Position: Midfielder

Youth career
- 1993–1994: Hapoel Sakhnin

Senior career*
Years	Team	Apps	(Gls)
1994–1996	Hapoel Sakhnin	-	(-)
1996–2006	Bnei Sakhnin	289	(36)
2006–2007	Maccabi Haifa	15	(1)
2007–2009	Ironi Kiryat Shmona	43	(3)
2009–2010	Bnei Sakhnin	31	(0)

International career
2004–2006	Israel	12	(1)

Managerial career
- 2010–2018: Bnei Sakhnin (youth)
- 2018–2019: Sektzia Ma'alot-Tarshiha
- 2019–2022: Maccabi Nujeidat
- 2023–: Bnei Sakhnin (youth)
- * Club domestic league appearances and goals

Abbas Suan (sometimes spelled Suwan or Swan, Arabic: عباس صوان, Hebrew: עבאס סואן; born January 27, 1976) is a retired Israeli footballer from Sakhnin in the Galilee. As a footballer he was considered by many as one of the best Israeli Arab players.

He became a national hero in 2006 for scoring the game-tying goal in the 90th minute of a World Cup qualifying match against Ireland.

In 2006, Suan signed a two-year contract with Maccabi Haifa but later moved to Premier League newcomers Ironi Kiryat Shmona. He returned to play for his original club Bnei Sakhnin.

On August 29, 2005 Suan was featured in an exposé in Sports Illustrated by Grant Wahl into the minorities that play on the Israel national football team. Suan has been the target of racism at football matches in Israel. During a match between Bnei Sakhnin and Betar Jerusalem, Betar fans waved a giant banner saying "Suan, you don't represent us", and shouted, “We hate all Arabs.” Betar Jerusalem was later subjected to a fine for verbal abuse.

Suan is also a featured subject of the documentary film "After The Cup:Sons of Sakhnin United" which chronicled the team and Suan's life after winning the Israeli national cup.

Aside from his club contract, he has many endorsement deals. Suan currently is the spokesperson for Subaru motor vehicles in Israel.

Although a devout Muslim, Suan has no trouble embracing Jewish culture in Israel. However, he has a mixed sense of identity, saying that "I am a Palestinian because I have a lot of brothers and cousins in the Arab countries. And I am Israeli because I live here and don't go out of my lands." During international football matches, Suan was one of two Arab players who refuse to sing during the playing of Hatikvah, Israel's national anthem, because it mentions only Jews. He was featured in a Journeyman Pictures documentary on Arab citizens of Israel.

== Honours ==
- Israel State Cup:
  - Winners (1): 2003–04
- Liga Leumit:
  - Runner-up (1): 2002–03
