= Hussniya Jabara =

Israeli-Arab politician (born 1958)

- حسنية جبّارة
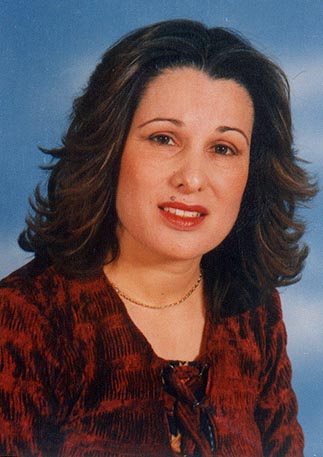

Faction represented in the Knesset
- 1999–2003: Meretz

Personal details
- Born: 11 April 1958 (age 67) Tayibe, Israel

Hussniya Jabara (Arabic: حسنية جبّارة, Hebrew: חוסניה ג'בארה; born 11 April 1958) is an Israeli former politician, who served as a member of the Knesset for Meretz between 1999 and 2003. She was the first female Israeli Arab to become a Knesset member.

== Biography ==
Jabara was born to a Muslim farming family in Tayibe. She studied physiotheraphy at the Wingate Institute.

She joined the Na'amat women's organisation and was chairwoman of its Tayibe branch between 1992 and 1994. Between 1995 and 1997 she served as Women's and Youth director at the Jewish-Arab Institute at Beit Berl Academic College, and became chairwoman of the Department for the Middle East at the college's International Institute.

Despite opposition from her father, Jabara sought to enter politics. Prior to the 1999 elections she won tenth place on the Meretz list, and entered the Knesset after the party won ten seats. During her first term she chaired the Subcommittee for the Advancement of the Status of Arab Women and was also a member of the Committee on the Status of Women.

In 2002 at the peak of the Second Intifada, she travelled to Ramallah to meet with Chairman of the Palestinian Authority Yasser Arafat, after five Palestinians were killed in the Gaza Strip. She told him that Israel's assassination policy was not helping Israel, the way the suicide bombers are not helping the Palestinian people.

She retained tenth place on the Meretz list for the 2003 elections, but lost her seat as the party was reduced to six MKs.

Jabara is married to Fathi, a driving instructor, and has three children.
