= Sundance Bilson-Thompson =

Australian physicist

Sundance Osland Bilson-Thompson is an Australian theoretical particle physicist. He has developed the idea that certain preon models may be represented topologically, rather than by treating preons as pointlike particles. His ideas have attracted interest in the field of loop quantum gravity, as they may represent a way of incorporating the Standard Model into loop quantum gravity at Planck scale.

== Career ==
In 2004 and 2005 Bilson-Thompson was a Visiting Academic at the University of Adelaide. From 2006 to 2009 he was a full-time academic at the Perimeter Institute for Theoretical Physics in Waterloo, Ontario, Canada. From 2010 he held a Ramsay Postdoctoral Fellowship at the University of Adelaide, Australia. In 2023 he was appointed a Research Fellow at the Centre for Quantum Computation and Communication Technology at RMIT University.

== Research ==
There have been claims that loop quantum gravity may be able to reproduce features resembling the Standard Model. So far only the first generation of leptons and quarks with correct parity properties have been modelled by Sundance Bilson-Thompson using preons constituted of braids of spacetime as the building blocks. However, there is no derivation of the Lagrangian that would describe the interactions of such particles, nor is it possible to show that such particles are fermions, nor that the gauge groups or interactions of the Standard Model are realised. Utilization of quantum computing concepts made it possible to demonstrate that the particles are able to survive quantum fluctuations.

In a 2005 paper, Sundance Bilson-Thompson proposed a model which adapted the Harari Rishon Model to preon-like objects which were extended ribbons, rather than point-like particles. This provided a possible explanation for why ordering of the subcomponents matters (giving rise to colour charge) whereas in the older Rishon Model, this feature must be treated as an ad hoc assumption. Bilson-Thompson refers to his extended ribbons as "helons", and his model as the Helon Model.

This model leads to an interpretation of electric and colour charge as a topological quantities: electric charge as the number of twists carried on the individual ribbons, and colour charge as the number of variants of such twisting for a fixed electric charge.

In a subsequent paper from 2006 Bilson-Thompson, Fotini Markopolou, and Lee Smolin suggested that in any of a class of quantum gravity theories similar to loop quantum gravity in which spacetime comes in discrete chunks, excitations of spacetime itself may play the role of preons, and give rise to the standard model of particle physics as an emergent property of the quantum gravity theory.

Consequently, Bilson-Thompson et al. proposed that loop quantum gravity could reproduce the standard model. In this scenario the four forces would already be unified. The first generation of fermions with correct charge and parity properties have been modelled using preons constituted of braids of spacetime as the building blocks.

Bilson-Thompson's original paper suggested that the higher-generation fermions could be represented by more complicated braidings, although explicit constructions of these structures were not given. The electric charge, colour, and parity properties of such fermions would arise in the same way as for the first generation. The model was expressly generalized for an infinite number of generations and for the weak force bosons, but not for photons or gluons, in a 2008 paper by Bilson-Thompson, Hackett, Kauffman and Smolin.

== Implications for Cosmology ==
The model has been implicated in a cosmogony with a single-quantum origin as was proposed by Georges Lemaître.

== Politics ==
At the 2016 Australian federal election, Bilson-Thompson was the lead candidate for the Australian Cyclists Party on the senate ballot paper for South Australia.
