= Yehudit Harari =

Israeli educator and writer (1885–1979)

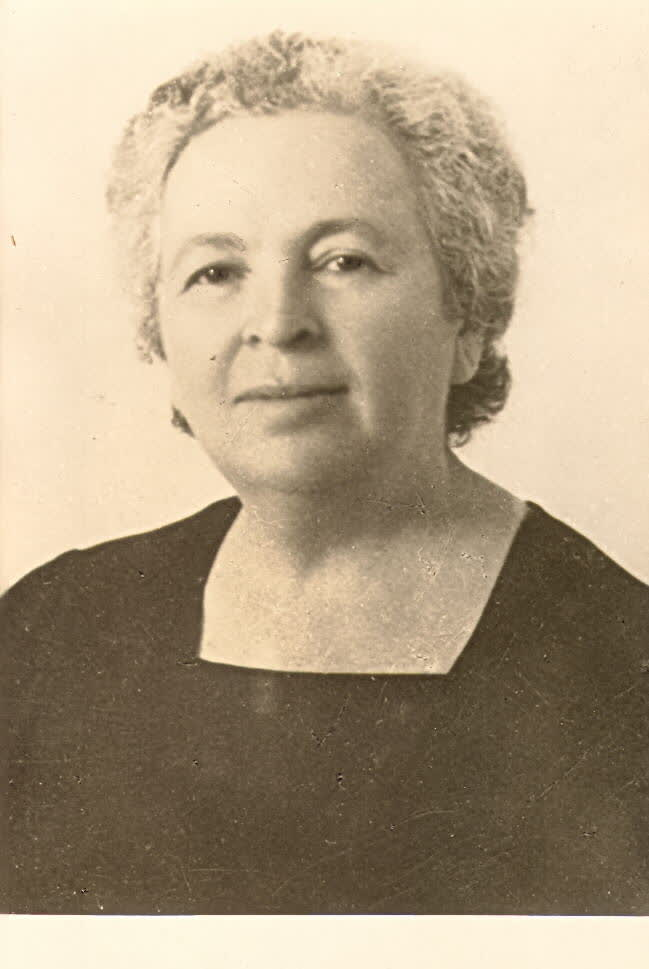
Yehudit Harari, photo from the mid-20th-century

Yehudit Harari (née Eisenberg; Hebrew: יהודית הררי; October 4, 1885 – June 7, 1979) was an educator, teacher, kindergarten teacher, and writer, one of the founders of Tel Aviv. She was one of the founders of the Hebrew Stage Enthusiasts Association, a member of the Habimah Theater council, and winner of the honorary prize for education of the Tel Aviv Municipality in 1965.

== Biography ==
=== Early life ===
Yehudit Harari was born in Pinsk, Belarus, in 1885. Her parents, Bilha-Esther (née Meshel) (d. 1936) and Aharon Eisenberg (1863–1931), were Halutzim (Hebrew: חלוצים) (Note: Halutz also "chalutz": Hebrew for a pioneer. The early Jewish immigrants to Palestine, both followers of practical Zionism (starting with 1897), and those who immediately preceded them - the Hovevei Zion and Bilu during the First Aliyah.) – members of the First Aliya, who immigrated to the Land of Israel in 1886 when she was a toddler. They lived in Jaffa for the first year, while her father specialized in agriculture in Rishon LeZion. When they bought their land in Wadi-Chanin (Ness Ziona), they first lived in a tent among the Bedouins, then in a cellar in Reuven Lerer's orchard until the completion of the construction of the house in Wadi-Chanin.

In the cellar of the Eisenberg family came many guests, among them Bilu'im, (Note: Bilu (Hebrew: ביל"ו), was a movement whose goal was the agricultural settlement of the Land of Israel. Its members were known as Bilu'im.) Hovevei Zion (aka Hibbat Zion), (Note: Hovevei Zion (Hebrew: חובבי ציון, lit. [Those who are] Lovers of Zion), also known as Hibbat Zion (Hebrew: חיבת ציון), refers to a variety of organizations which began in 1881.) activists and guests from the Diaspora. In one of the meetings in the basement, Aharon Eisenberg, one of the first pioneers of Hovevei Zion, learned that between the moshava Kfar Batya and Wadi-Chanin, a plot of the land "Duran" (Hebrew: חירבת דוראן), which belonged to the Rock family in Jaffa, was for sale. Eisenberg turned to his friend Yehoshua Hankin and they both organized the purchase of the land. That same year, the company Menucha VeNahala (Hebrew: מנוחה ונחלה) (Note: Menucha VeNachala (Hebrew for allotted haven) was a settlement company founded in 1890 by Hovevei Zion. The name of the company derives from the verse in Deuteronomy 12:9: "because you have not yet come to the allotted haven that the LORD your God is giving you".) was founded in Warsaw, which purchased the lands and thus established the new moshava of Rehovot. In 1890 Aharon Eisenberg began to manage the planting work of Menucha and Nachla, and the family moved to the moshava and was one of its founders.

The Eisenberg House, which was one of the first houses in Rehovot and which was called "The Eisenberg Hotel", served for many years as a center for all the actions related to the establishment and development of the moshava. Bilha and Aharon gave their daughters and sons, seven in number, the same education and taught them to Torah and work. All of them received academic education and integrated into the building of the homeland in various fields. Yehudit completed an elementary school in Rehovot and completed her high school studies with the help of private teachers (Israel Belkind, Esther Shapira, Israel Aharoni and Yitzhak Cohen), due to the lack of high schools in the Land of Israel.

In her childhood, she grew up in the countryside "between the vines and almonds, among the olive trees, the carob trees, the citrus trees and the eucalyptus trees, among the shepherds and the vineyard workers". As she described her childhood experiences, "In horseback riding she is the first in the village, on trees she climbs like a cat, in swimming at the pool no one can compete with her, milking cows she knows, she harvests, and at night she rides a camel to Rishon LeZion to carry the grapes to the winery. The boys list willingly to her singing in the vineyards, urging her to dance like a Bedouin with a drawn sword around the bonfire". Life in the young colony of Rehovot was vibrant and full of interest. "On the hill of love, the young people were gather in the evenings, light a bonfire, sing and discuss the future of the Yishuv and Hebrew work".

=== Marriage and family life ===
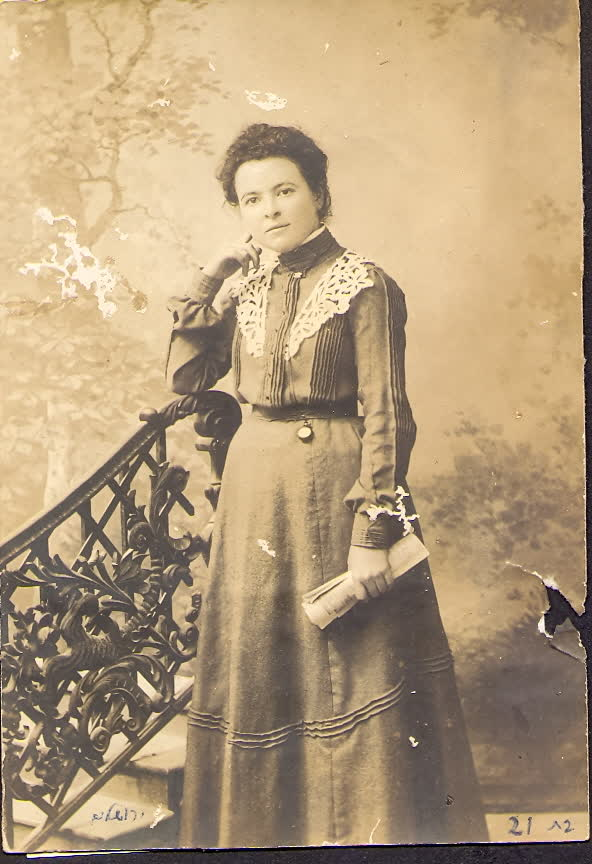
Yehudit Harari at the age of 21 (1906)

When she was 13 she met her future husband, Haim Harari (Bloomberg), a student of Mikveh Israel, a boy who came to Palestine alone to study agriculture. After graduating in 1901 he returned to Russia, and she promised that she would wait for him until he returned. For six years they constantly corresponded, to her parents' dismay, who feared for their daughter's good reputation. She documented the correspondence in great detail in her book Between the Vineyards. The young couple suffered many hardships during those years, each separately, but their love did not subside.

After six years, he returned to Eretz Yisrael to serve as a teacher at the Herzliya Hebrew Gymnasium. A year later, in 1907, they married. Yehudit, who was working as a teacher and kindergarten teacher at the Evelina de Rothschild Girls' School in Jerusalem, left her job and moved to live with her young husband in Jaffa. Haim Harari, a teacher, and educator himself taught at the Herzliya Gymnasium until his death in 1940. He advocated for the concept of gender equality. Because of his reservations about the dual standard of sexual purity before marriage, which encouraged men to sexual experiences and prohibited this entirely among women, he committed himself to sexual purity before his marriage. Their relationship can be seen in the pursuit of equality, but also in the latent sense that the birthright is given to the husband's desires. After a year of marriage, in July 1908 their only son, Yizhar Harari, was born.

Yehudit and Haim Harari initiated and organized the "Hebrew Stage Enthusiasts", drama groups of actors and amateur actresses who staged plays at a time when there were no Hebrew theaters in Israel. He was an actor and director, and she participated in acting and played major roles in many plays that were produced. Among other things, she played in the play Mirele Efros by Yaakov Gordin. The veterans of Tel Aviv said that the Harari's successful performances were known from a distance and attracted not only the residents of Tel Aviv and Jaffa, but also the residents of the moshavot After the establishment of the National Habima Theatre Yehudit served as a member of the Theater Council.

In 1907 they were among the families of Jaffa residents who founded the first Hebrew city and participated in the land lottery of the Ahuzat Bayit Association and were among the 66 founding families of Tel Aviv. They drew a plot on Yehuda Halevy Street, but because of their desire to live near the Gymnasium, they pressed the Ahuzat Bayit committee to give them the plot on Ahad Ha'am Street that had previously been promised to Haikil Schiff. The pressure bore fruit and the Harari family received the plot they requested.

=== Teacher and educator in Israel ===
==== A young kindergarten teacher ====
From her youth, she directed herself to teaching. When she was 16, after a two-year course at the first Hebrew kindergarten founded in Rishon LeZion by Esther Shapira Ginzburg, she founded the second Hebrew kindergarten in Rehovot. When she was 17, the director of the Evelina de Rothschild Girls' School in Jerusalem, Hannah Landau, invited her to work as a kindergarten teacher and Hebrew teacher at the school, where she also studied teaching at the English Hebrew Teacher Training Seminar. Her work there, despite her youth, had a great influence on the school's management, among other things by increasing Hebrew studies among the students, removing English from the kindergarten and the lower grades, and instilling Jewish-national consciousness by establishing a Hebrew library in the school, which until then included only holy and prayer books

==== Teaching and Continuing Education ====
Following her marriage to Haim Harari, she moved to Jaffa and taught at Herzliya Hebrew Gymnasium until the birth of her son Yizhar in 1908. David Smilansky, a teaching fellow of those years, said that "there were always boys and girls who had a special affection for the experienced teacher and obeyed her instructions" In 1910 she returned to teach at the Herzliya Hebrew Gymnasium until 1913 when Yehudit and Haim Harari went to study in Paris on behalf of the Gymnasium.

At the University of Paris (Sorbonne), she studied general and French literature, psychology, pedagogy, history and natural sciences. After one year of study, the First World War broke out, and the couple moved to Geneva and continued their studies there. During her studies, she worked for two years in research work at the Psychological Laboratory, under the direction of psychologist Prof. Edward Clafred. At the same time, she studied the Montessori method and specialized in special education according to Dr. Decruly's method. In 1919 she completed her studies at the Jean-Jacques Rousseau Institute (aka Academy of Geneva), and received a diploma.

==== Founder, director and public activist ====
After the couple returned to Israel, she was sent to teach at the Levinsky Teachers and Teachers Seminary. At the same time, she ran the "Baby House" of the seminary and the exemplary school in Neve Tzedek which she founded. There she introduced the teaching methods of Montessori and Decruly, inserted new furniture and modern methods, which were later introduced in all the Hebrew schools in Israel

Due to a large number of students, the school was moved to Geula Street and since then it has been called Geula. With the establishment of the new school building on Balfour Street in Tel Aviv, the school moved to its final residence and since then it has been called the Balfour School, which she ran until 1955. She was later appointed principal of the model school next to the Levinsky Teachers and Teachers Seminary.

In addition to her involvement in the city's educational life, as a member of the Kindergarten Teacher Center, the Teachers' Union and the Board of Directors, she also contributed to the cultural and social life that was conducted there. She claimed that she preferred to focus on educational work and refused to be elected as a woman's representative for municipal and government institutions. In 1958, when she was 50, she retired. According to her, she devoted herself to literary work, but in practice she continued to work on a voluntary basis in the management of the Education Archives and in the management of a special needs "Scholarship Program for Children with Disabilities".

In 1965 she was awarded an honorary prize in the framework of the Tel Aviv Municipality's Prize for Education for her service in nurturing elementary Hebrew education in Israel, for integrating new methods in education and teaching, and for establishing new educational institutions.

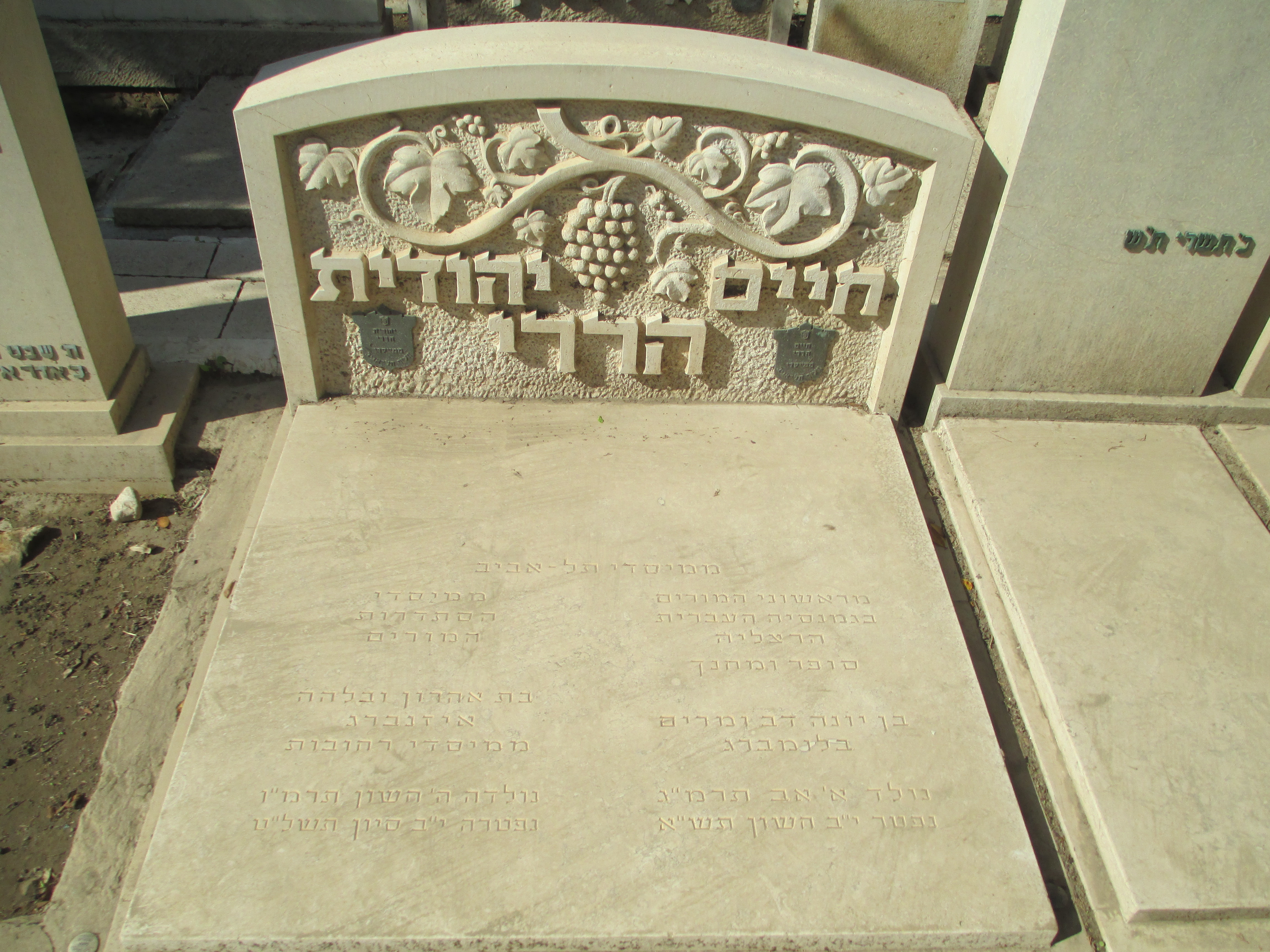
The grave of Yehudit and Haim Harari in the Trumpeldor cemetery

She died on June 7, 1979, at the age of 94. She was buried, along her husband Haim Harari, in the Trumpeldor Cemetery in Tel Aviv.

=== Family ===
Her son was Yizhar Harari, a Zionist activist, Israeli politician and a Knesset member, best known as initiator of the Harari Decision (aka Harari Proposal) of 13 June 1950, a landmark in Israeli constitutional law. Her grandson is distinguished physicist Prof. Haim Harari, President, from 1988 to 2001, of the Weizmann Institute of Science. Her sisters and brothers are Leah Rachel Idelson, who was one of the founders of Tel Aviv, Hanna Eisenberg (Frumkin), Ben Carmi Eisenberg, Amatzia Eisenberg, who was a PICA executive in Eretz Yisrael, Oved Eisenberg, a public figure and a Zionist activist in the Yishuv, and Yehushua Eisenberg who was District Judge and Director General of the Israeli Magistrates' Courts.

== Literary works ==
Yehudit started writing at a young age. Her anonymous letters were published in "Ha-Melitz", short stories and articles published in the periodical Ha'omer (edited by S. Ben Zion), HaPoel HaTza'ir, Bustanai, Ganenu, Hed HaHinuch, Haaretz, Zmanim and many more.

In 1948, her autobiographical book Between the Vineyards was published by Dvir. The book tells the story of her life from being a girl to her adult life, with the love story of Haim Harari and Yehudit at the center, as they are called in the book "Ziv" and "Talia". The names of the family members were disguised under borrowed names, but she made it clear in the introduction that the story was written according to diaries, letters and documents that had been preserved in the family archive. The background of the family story describes the history of the Jewish community in Palestine at the beginning of the 20th century. In her book, she described with surprising frankness her doubts about the well-known fate of a married woman at the time:

The days of vacation are over, the gymnasium is open, Ziv is busy with his work day and night, he usually comes home after midnight, Talia looks forward to his arrival and suffers from loneliness. [...] It is a shame that she left her favorite teaching profession and she is devoted only to the home and the kitchen and to the day-to-day nonsense. She dreams of working at a school, but all jobs are occupied. She begins to be dissatisfied with her life. Why should marriage change a woman's life and enslave herself in the house? Why does a man after marriage continue to live his normal life and why does a woman have to give up all that is dear to her?

— Yehudit Harari, Between the Vineyards, Dvir, 1948, p. 205, 208

The female character portrayed in her book is innovative, not only because she is curious, adventurous, and eager for self-fulfillment in her studies and work, but also because she is bold enough to pose questions to traditional female roles.

In 1958 she published her book Woman and Mother in Israel published by Massada, which deals with the Jewish woman from biblical times to the tenth anniversary of the State of Israel. She devoted her book to the "Women of Israel" and wrote down the contributions and activities of Jewish women throughout history. In the introduction she wrote:

In my book A Woman and Mother in Israel, it is told about the women of Israel who took an active part in the life of the nation for good and bad, especially those who have been active throughout the generations for our people, and preserved in the homeland and the Diaspora the existence of the nation and its culture. About the Jewish woman who illuminated the house of Israel in the dark ages of exile, [...] about the women who participated in building our homeland, in reviving our language, in flourishing our desolation, in defending our lands .... Many are the men in our nation and especially the women who do not know much about the life of the Israeli woman and her actions, I hope that this book will teach them to know their sisters and mothers.

— Yehudit Harari, Mother and Wife in Israel: From Biblical Times to the 10th Anniversary of the State of Israel, Massada, 1958

== Selected bibliography ==
- From the Cellar to the Pastry - a short story, printed in the journal "The Omer" - Volume I, 1907
- Slap in the Face - short story, printed in the journal "Bustanai"
- Work to Conquest, in "Tmura" - articles published by the Writers Association, March–April 1925
- The Bat by Jean-Henri Fabre - Translation from French, 1928
- Exodus by Flinders Petrie - English translation; Published in the journal "Moledet"

== Sources ==
- Berlowitz, Yaffa, ed. (1992). Wandering in the Land: Travels in Eretz Yisrael of the First Aliya. Tel Aviv: MoD Publishing House.
- Margalit, Shira. "Private as Public: Ita Yellin and Yehudit Harari Writing Autobiography". Cathedra. 118.
- Smilansky, David; Harari, Yehudit (1958), With my countrymen and my town people: Personal stories and memoir, Public committee for the publication of the writings of David Smilansky and Massada publication
- Tidhar, D. (1966). Entsiklopedyah le-halutse ha-yishuv u-vonav. Vol. 15. p. 4803.
