= Nissim Eliad =

Israeli politician (1919–2014)

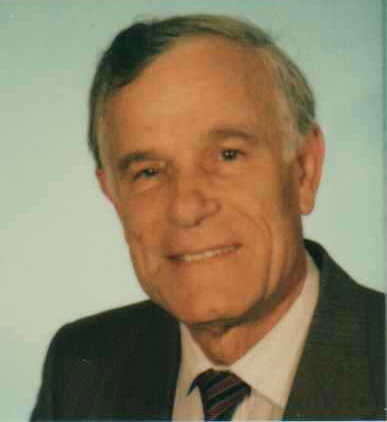
- Eliad during his time in the Knesset

Faction represented in the Knesset
- 1968–1969: Independent Liberals
- 1969–1974: Independent Liberals
- 1974–1977: Independent Liberals

Personal details
- Born: 1 July 1919 Tiberias, Palestine
- Died: 15 November 2014 (aged 95)

Nissim Eliad (Hebrew: נסים אליעד; 1 July 1919 – 15 November 2014) was an Israeli politician who served as a member of the Knesset for the Independent Liberals between 1968 and 1977.

== Biography ==
Born Nissim Amsalem in Tiberias, Eliad was a member of the Maccabi Hatzair and Betar youth movements, as well as being amongst the youth leadership of Mapai. At age 13 he began working for the mandatory government's postal service in Haifa, and would work for it for 10 years. In 1944, he was suspected by the Irgun of being a British agent and an ad hoc Irgun court sentenced him to death. The Irgun chief of staff was doubtful and ordered the sentence suspended. A subsequent investigation cleared him and the death sentence was canceled. He studied oriental studies, bible and Jewish history at the Hebrew University of Jerusalem, and also studied at a law school, where he was certified as a lawyer.

In 1950 he joined the Progressive Party. For the 1965 elections he was on the Independent Liberal list (a party formed by former Progressive Party members after its merger with the General Zionists), but failed to win a seat. However, he entered the Knesset on 23 December 1968 as a replacement for party leader Pinchas Rosen, who had decided to retire from politics. Although he lost his seat in the 1969 elections, he returned to the Knesset shortly after the elections, after Moshe Kol resigned his seat after being given a ministerial position. He lost his seat for a second time in the 1973 elections, but returned again after Kol was re-appointed to the cabinet. He lost his seat for a final time in the 1977 elections.

Outside of the Knesset, Eliad was also a member of the presidium of the World Zionist Organization's executive committee, and of the executive committee of the Histadrut trade union.
