= Juansher (name) =

Juansher (Persian: جوانشیر, Javânshir; Georgian: ჯუანშერი) is a masculine given name of Iranian origin. Notable people with the name include:

- Juansher (fl. 7 century), Iranian ruling prince
- Juansher of Kakheti (fl. 8 century), Georgian ruling prince
- Juansher Juansheriani (fl. c. 8/9 century), Georgian prince and historian
- Juansher Chkareuli (b. 1940), Georgian theoretical physicist
- Juansher Burchuladze (b. 1978), Georgian politician and Minister of Defence
