= Hypercolor (physics) =

Hypothetical force

In particle physics, hypercolor is a hypothetical attractive force that binds prequarks together by the exchange of hypergluons, analogous to the exchange of gluons by the color force, which binds quarks together.

== See also ==
- Technicolor (physics)
