= Leon Reich =

Polish Zionist lawyer (1879–1929)

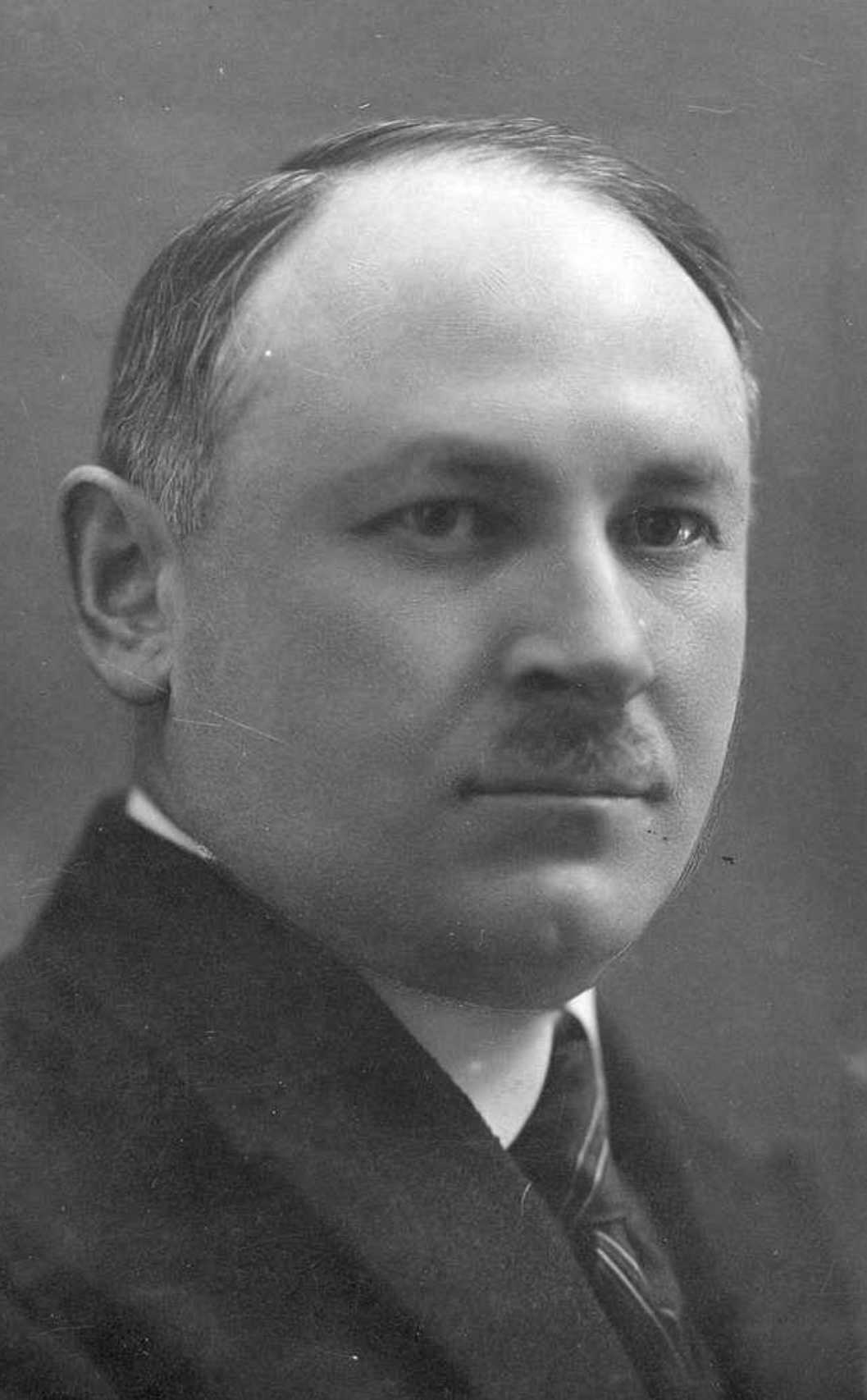

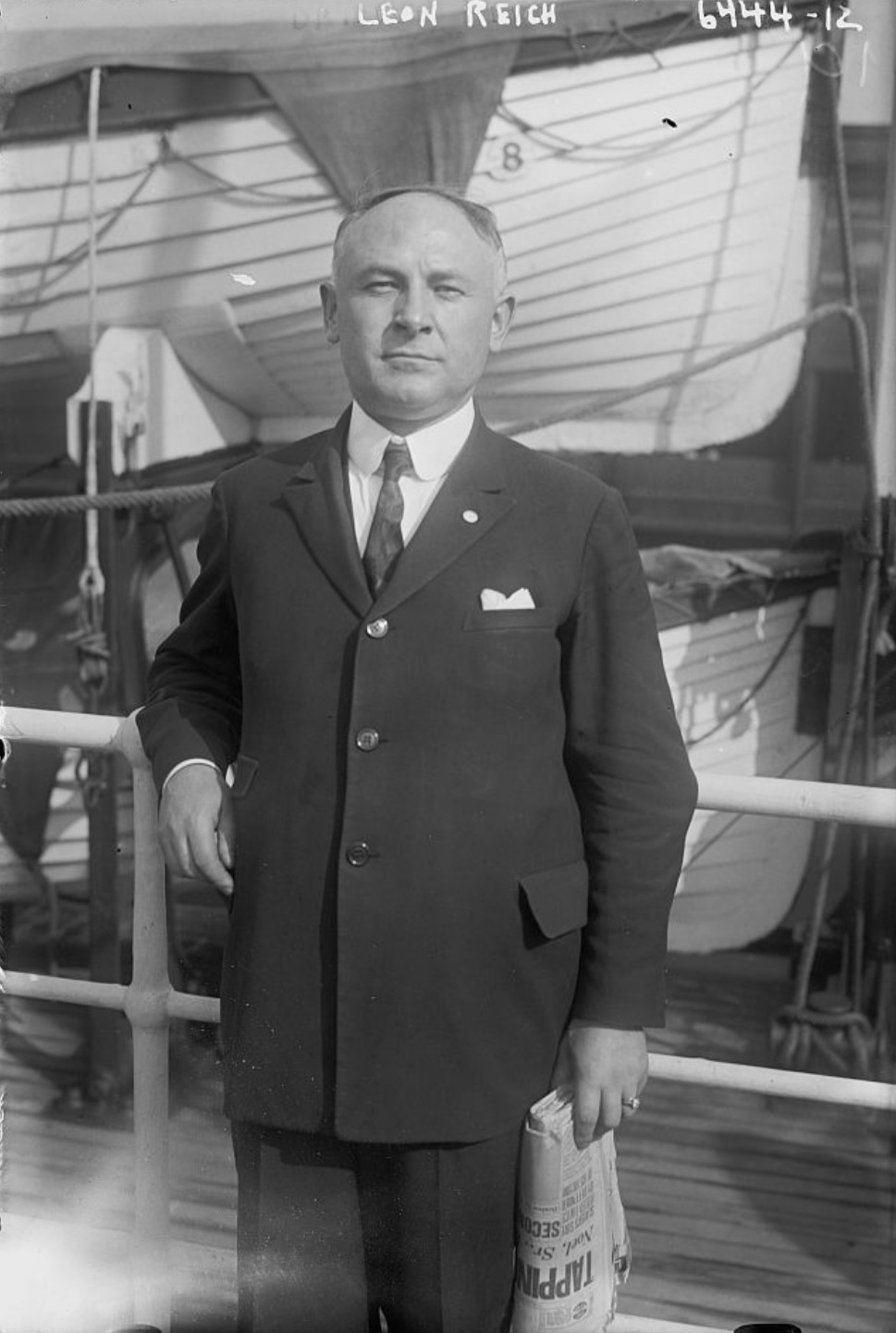

Leon Reich (July 11, 1879 – December 1, 1929) was a Polish Zionist leader, lawyer and politician.

== Life ==
Reich was born on July 11, 1879, in Drohobych, Galicia, Austria-Hungary. His parents were wealthy merchants and Orthodox Jews. He attended a high school in Sambor.

Reich received his law degree at the University of Lviv, after which he studied at the École des Sciences Politiques in Paris. As a student, he became an active Zionist and founded both the Union of Jewish Students (Ognisko) and the Zionist student organization in Galicia (Emunah). From 1907 to 1914, he edited the Voskhod, the leading organ of Galician Zionism. In 1913, he represented Eastern Galician Zionists on the executive committee of the Zionist Organization. He took part in the Zionist Congresses as a leading delegate of the General Zionists. He edited a Polish Zionist in 1910. In the 1911 election, he unsuccessfully ran for the Imperial Council.

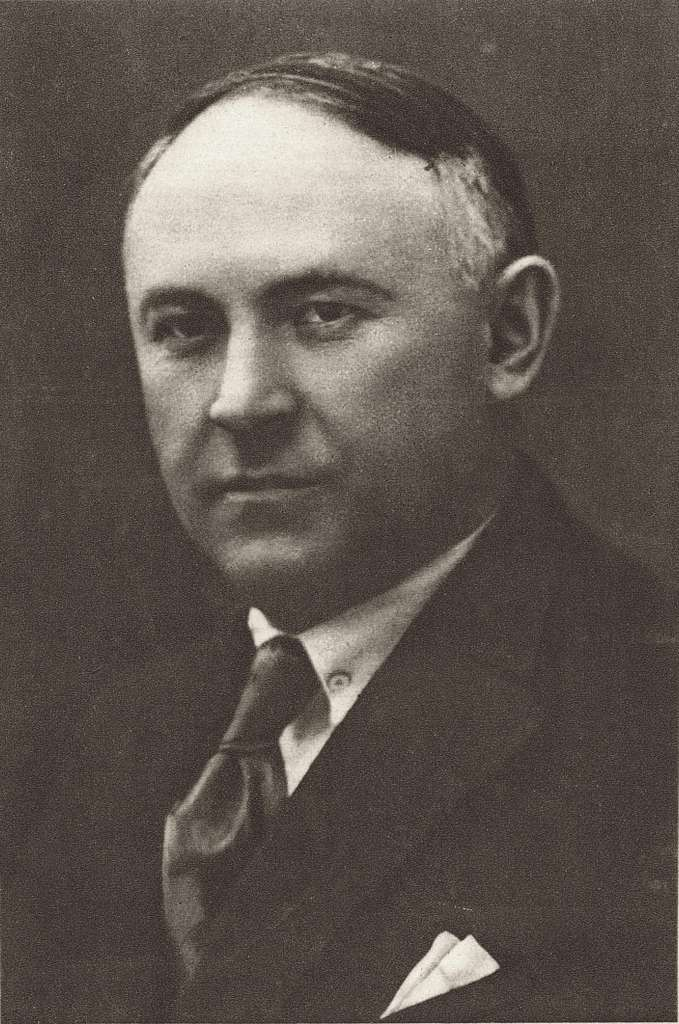

During World War I, Reich served in the legal department of the Austro-Hungarian Army. After the war, he was a main organizer of the Jewish National Council of East Galicia. When the Polish–Ukrainian War broke out, he was interned by Polish authorities at a camp in Baranów. He was released with intervention from Józef Piłsudski, Naḥum Sokolow, and Western European Jewish leaders. During the Paris Peace Conference, he was vice-president of the Comité des Délégations Juives and edited a book on the national rights of Eastern European Jews called Les droits nationaux des Juifs en Europe orientale (The National Rights of Jews in Western Europe) in 1919. He wrote a memoir of that period in 1922 called Żydowska delegacja pokojowa w Paryżu (The Jewish Peace Delegation in Paris).

Reich practiced law in Lviv. In 1920, he became chairman of the Zionist Organization of Eastern Galicia. In the 1922 Polish legislative election, he was elected to the Sejm. He was re-elected to the Sejm in 1928. In 1924, he became chairman of the Jewish Club in the Sejm and Senate (Kolo Zydowskie). In that position, he and Ozjasz Thon negotiated an agreement with the Polish government where Jewish members of the Sejm would support the government in exchange for some concessions for the Jews. The agreement, known as Ugoda, was widely opposed in the Jewish community and became void following the May Coup. He was forced to resign as chairman of the Jewish Club, although he retained his influence, especially in eastern Galicia. He was on the legal defense team of Stanisław Steiger, who was falsely accused of attempting to assassinate Stanisław Wojciechowski in 1924. He was a frequent contributor to the Polish-language dailies Chwila and Nowy dziennik and the Galician Yiddish papers Der yid and Togblat. He also founded a short-lived Zionist Polish-language daily in Warsaw called Dziennik Warzsawski in order to increase his influence throughout Poland.

Reich died from an unsuccessful appendectomy on December 1, 1929. 35,000 Jews attended his funeral in Lviv, along with numerous delegations from all over Poland, the vice-governor of the province, and representatives from the Sejm. The Orthodox Rabbi Isaak Ziff, Dr. Barth and Dr. Emil Schmorack of the Zionist Organization, Mr. Chajes of the Kehillah, Reform Rabbi Lwei Freund, and Mr. Hindes of the Jewish Agency spoke at the graveside. No one from the Jewish Parliamentary Club spoke since none of Reich's supporters wanted Yitzhak Gruenbaum to speak due to newspaper attacks Gruenbaum directed against Reich.

In 1934, Reich's body was exhumed, which was witnessed by a large throng that included Zionist leaders, representatives from general Jewish organizations, and government representatives. The body was then sent to Palestine and reburied in the Old Cemetery in Tel Aviv. The body was transported to the cemetery with the Boy Scouts as a guard of honor and a long procession following it to the cemetery. Nahum Sokolow, Ben-Zion Mossinsohn, Ben-Zion Meir Hai Uziel, Israel Rokach, Ephraim Washitz, and Mr. Spindel delivered eulogies.
