= Haim Harari (educator) =

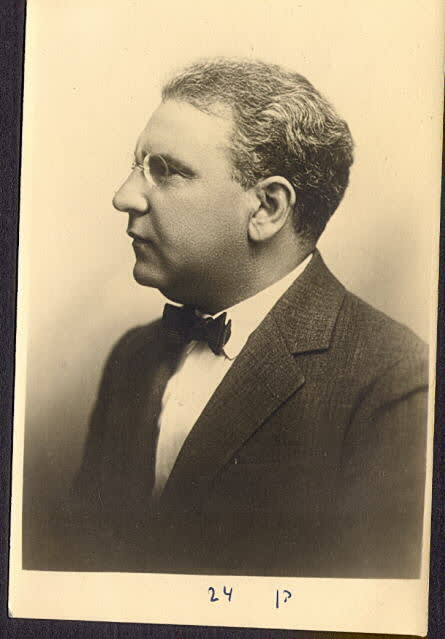
Haim Harari, Eretz Yisrael, 1907

Haim Harari (Hebrew: חיים הררי, previously שניאור זלמן בלומברג; July 13, 1883 – November 13, 1940) was one of the founders of Tel Aviv.

== Career ==
Shneur Zalman Blumberg (later Haim Harari) was a Hebrew teacher, writer, and publicist, member of the Second Assembly of Representatives, an amateur actor and director, and one of the founders of the 'Hebrew Stage Lovers Association'.

== Personal life ==
His wife was the writer Yehudit Harari. His son was Yizhar Harari, a Zionist activist and Israeli politician, and his grandson is theoretical physicist Haim Harari, former President of the Weizmann Institute of Science.
