= Aharon Eliyahu Eisenberg =

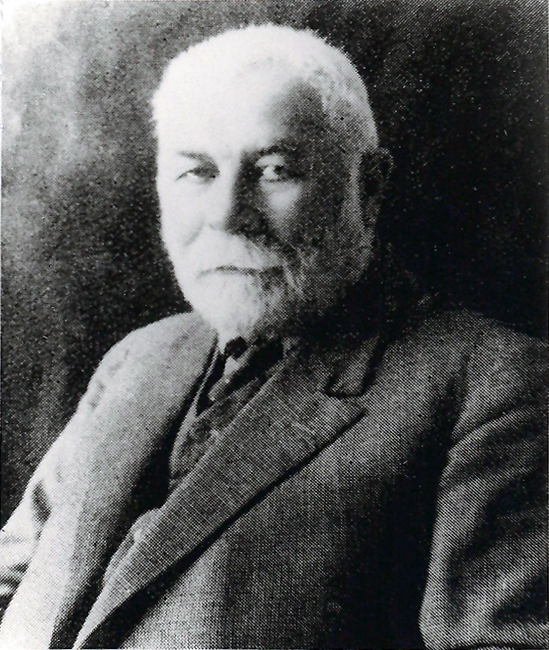
- Born: November 14, 1863; Pinsk, Russian Empire (now Lithuania)
- Died: 23 September 1931 (aged 67); Rehovot, Mandatory Palestine
- Known for: Early Jewish settlement of Palestine
- Movement: Proto-Zionism; Hibbat Zion

Aharon Eliyahu Eisenberg (14 November 1863 – 23 September 1931) was a pivotal figure in the Hibbat Zion movement and the development of Jewish agricultural settlements in Palestine.

Born in Pinsk, then part of the Russian Empire, Eisenberg was deeply influenced by the burgeoning Zionist ideals of the late 19th century. In 1886, he immigrated to Palestine, then under Ottoman rule, as part of the First Aliyah, a wave of Jewish immigration driven by the desire to establish a Jewish homeland. Eisenberg was instrumental in founding several moshavot, or agricultural colonies, including Rehovot in 1890. His efforts were crucial in transforming barren lands into thriving agricultural communities, which became a model for future settlements. He was also a key figure in the establishment of the Jewish National Fund, which played a significant role in land acquisition for Jewish settlement.

Eisenberg's work laid the groundwork for the agricultural and economic infrastructure that would support the future State of Israel, marking him as a significant contributor to the early development of Jewish settlement in Israel.

== Early life ==
Eisenberg was born in September 1863 to Rabbi Avraham Moshe Eisenberg, a noted figure in Pinsk. Eisenberg was seen as a diligent student and gained a reputation as an "illui" or prodigy. His studies included both Torah and Kabalah. He claims to have dreamed of Jerusalem and Safed as a child.

Even before his Bar Mitzvah, he was drawn to manual labor working the garden behind his house. When he reached his bar-mitzvah, his father approached him, kissed his forehead, and said: “When I myself was praying the evening prayer service, and I said ‘May our eyes behold…’, I saw that my son would travel to the Land of Israel.”

From then forward Eisenberg began preparing for it. He revealed his plan to his friends, and together they were involved in founding the Hibbat Zion (“Lovers of Zion”) movement.

At seventeen he began giving talks in synagogues about his love of Zion. At nineteen he married Bilha, daughter of Yehoshua Meshel, from a respected and well-to-do family, and he made an explicit condition with her that after the wedding they would go up to the Land of Israel. The condition was fulfilled, and in December 1887 they arrived with their two daughters, in what was then Ottoman land - now Israel. At their first stop, in Jaffa, Eisenberg tore up his Russian passport—so that they would not be able to return to the Diaspora.

== Later life ==
After his arrival in Israel, he joined workers in Rishon LeZion and with the construction of the Great Synagogue there, he decided to learn the craft of stone-cutting in order to participate in its construction and to support his family. To learn the craft, he gave a valuable gold watch he had received as a gift from his father to an Arab stonemason, who in return taught him the work.

The daily commute from Jaffa to Rishon LeZion was difficult, and his wife, left alone in the city, did not understand the Arabic spoken by the "Ashkenazim" nor the Ladino spoken by her Sephardi neighbors. The couple decided to move to Wadi Hanin (Nes Ziona). They made their home in the cellar of Reuven Lerer, and this house became a center for Jaffa youth. Here the "Bnei Moshe" society gathered, and meetings were held that dealt with the fate of settlement throughout the country. In addition, Eisenberg served as secretary of the "Workers’ Association."

With a little money he received from his family and his wife’s family, Eisenberg purchased a 30-dunam plot of land in Nes Ziona, on which he planted a vineyard. Eisenberg became a farmer and grew attached to this plot of land with all his heart. His acquaintances and friends also bought similar plots, which they entrusted to Eisenberg’s care. He had learned the trade from the vintners of Rishon LeZion, Mikveh Israel and Gedera, and in addition he obtained professional books in German which he studied until he became an expert vintner. He named his son after this - Ben-Karmi. Nevertheless, since he did not earn enough from his work in the vineyards, he would from time to time return to stone-cutting in Jaffa and Rishon.

Eisenberg never stopped dreaming of a workers’ colony that would not depend on Baron Rothschild and his support. He tried to establish one in Nes Ziona, but without success. Together with his friend Yehuda Gurazovsky, a teacher from Ekron, he would meet on Sabbaths at Durān, and they dreamed of buying this land and settling it as a free Hebrew colony.

In 1889, a rumor reached Eisenberg that a group of Germans from Jerusalem had sent emissaries to inspect Durān with the intention of purchasing it. He immediately turned to his friend and loyal comrade Yehoshua Hankin, who bought the land in Eisenberg's name. In Spring 1890, they took possession of the land, and the place was named Rehovot — after the verse in the Torah, "for now the Lord has made room for us…"

From the day he settled in Rehovot, Eisenberg dedicated his entire life to it. He took part in the first general assembly, was a member of the first committee, was the director on behalf of the "Menucha VeNachala" company, and was chairman of the committee from 1901 to 1922.

His influence in the Yishuv and in Rehovot was substantial. He played an active role in all cultural, economic, public, and political institutions. He joined the Yishuv's delegation to Paris to see Baron Rothschild, traveled often to the government in Constantinople on matters for the Yishuv, and founded "Agudat Neta'im".

In 1901, the boundaries of Rehovot were expanded for the first time since its founding. Through Eisenberg's efforts, a plot of about 300 dunams was purchased from the lands of Ramla on the northern border of the settlement. One of the purchasers of the land was Zalman Minkov. In 1904, he planted the first orchard in Rehovot, which would later become a major and central economic sector in the life of the settlement.

Aharon Eisenberg also took part in the struggle for Rehovot to establish its own independent winery. In 1903, while serving as head of the settlement's committee, he sent a letter to Ze'ev Gluskin, who headed "Menucha VeNachala" and was among the founders of the Carmel Winery Company. In the letter, Eisenberg wrote that a winery should be established in the settlement. The proposal sparked arguments between those who supported establishing an independent winery and those who opposed it. In mid-1904, a memorandum of understanding was signed between Ze’ev Gluskin and Aharon Eisenberg, who met in Constantinople: the Carmel Company would lend 10,000 rubles for the construction of a winery in Rehovot.

During the tenure of High Commissioner Herbert Samuel, he was a member of the Provisional Committee for the Jews of Eretz Israel and on the committee representing the settlements under the Zionist Executive (which was the Small Actions Committee of the Zionist Organization). He was a leading member of B'nai B'rith and among the founders of the Jewish National Fund; he was elected to the winegrowers’ committee, and when the Winegrowers’ Syndicate was formed, he served as a council member.

In 1919 he participated in a congress in London and campaigned there for the "Brandeis Plan", but without success. He took part in the founding of "Knesset Yisrael", which first convened in 1920. He was elected to the first Elected Assembly and as a member of the executive of the first National Council (the national council of the Jewish Yishuv in Eretz Israel).

Throughout his life in the settlement, he devoted himself to public service, believing that everyone should dedicate part of their personal time to communal roles and leadership. He stood out in all community work, always ready to take responsibility. He was especially noted for his modesty, humility, and accessibility—his home became a refuge for every new immigrant and anyone in need.

Between October 1920 and February 1923, Eisenberg was a member of the body called "The Advisory Council". This body in which senior government officials, four Muslims, three Christians and three Jews were members, constituted a kind of advisory council to the UK High Commissioner. The other Jewish members of the council were Yitzhak Ben-Zvi (who retired in mid-1921 and was replaced by Haim Margaliot Kalvariski) and David Yelin.

Eisenberg was a founder of several important organizations and societies: he was a member of the council of the Carmel Company and the Winegrowers' Society, a member of the Farmers' Association, and he also served on the executive council of the National Committee (which parallels today's Knesset).

On Yom Kippur 1931 he suffered a heart attack in synagogue, and two days later, on September 23, 1931, he died.

== Legacy ==
In Rehovot, a street was named after him, and in 1935 a neighborhood in the city was built bearing his name — Ramat Aharon. After his death, his sons donated his vineyard to the Jewish National Fund for the establishment of a neighborhood to commemorate their father.

He had seven children: Ben-Karmi who served in the Turkish Army during WW1 where he was captured and died in Siberia; Amatzia; Oved; Yehoshua; Yehudit; Rachel; Hannah (wife of Gad Frumkin).
