= Bernard Hausner =

Polish rabbi, politician, and diplomat

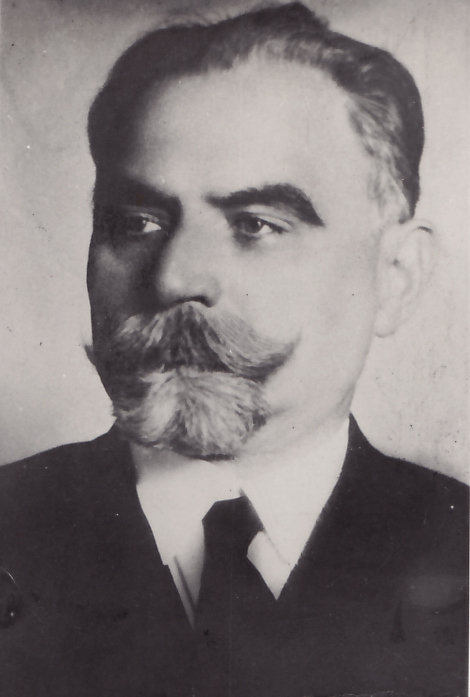

Bernard Hausner (March 11, 1874 – August 8, 1938) was a Polish rabbi, politician, and diplomat.

== Life ==
Hausner was born on March 11, 1874, in Chortkiv, Galicia, Austria-Hungary, the son of Shlomo and Tsherna Hausner.

Hausner became an active Zionist while in high school. He was ordained a rabbi at the rabbinical seminary in Vienna and received a doctorate in philosophy from the German University in Prague. He returned to Galicia in 1903 and taught Jewish studies at the government high school in Lviv. As an administrator, he granted financial aid to poor students and started programs to encourage Galician Jews to work in crafts, industry, and agriculture. He also participated in Zionist activities there. When the Russians occupied Lviv from 1914 to 1916 during World War I, he became the rabbi of the city's Progressive community and acted as the representative of the city's Jews before the occupation authorities. During that time, he was also the main secretary of the Va‘adat ha-‘Ezrah, which helped the city's Jews and refugees. After the Austrians regained control of the city, he volunteered for the Austro-Hungarian Army and served as a chaplain in the Italian front.

After the war, Hausner reorganized Mizrachi and helped establish school under its sponsorship. In 1921, he was elected first president of the movement in eastern Galicia, serving in that office until 1925. He was also chairman of the Jewish National Fund in Galicia from 1921 to 1924. He resigned from all his Mizrachi positions in 1927, declaring the movement needed to become a nonpolitical ideological organization within the larger Zionist movement in order to reduce polarizations between secular and Orthodox Zionists. He was elected to the Sejm in 1922, serving as a deputy there until 1927. An executive committee member of the Jewish parliamentary faction Koło, he tried to bridge the gaps between Congress Poland Zionists (who were radically opposed to the authorities) and the more compromising Galician Zionists. In the Sejm, he dealt with both Jewish and general economic issues.

In 1927, Hausner was appointed Polish Commercial Representative for Palestine and Syria. He was initially stationed in Haifa, although in 1928 he was transferred to Tel Aviv. In 1932, he became the Polish Consul-General at Tel Aviv, with jurisdiction at Jaffa and authorization from Alexander K. Sloan to act as U.S. Consul at Jerusalem for Palestine and Transjordan. While in Tel Aviv, he was a sponsor and president of Palestine Polish Chamber of Commerce. In 1933, he returned to Poland to work as a councillor for the Ministry of Foreign Affairs. In 1934, he was sent to the United States as part of a mission to improve trade relations between Poland and the United States. He resigned from all his positions in the Polish government in 1935 and spent the rest of his life in Palestine.

Hausner was active in public affairs in both Poland and Palestine. He published essays on Jewish subjects in Polish, Including Hebrew grammar, the Polish poet Juliusz Slowacki's use of scripture, and parallels between the Book of Job and Greek tragedy. In 1912, he wrote a translation of the machzor called Modlitwy Na Dni Swiateczne. In 1926, he published a booklet called Sanacja Polskiego Pieniadza (Rehabilitation of Polish Currency). In 1929, he was made an officer of the Polish Order of Polonia Restituta.

Hausner had a wife and three children. One of his children was Gideon Hausner, the chief prosecutor of the Eichmann trial. Another was Meriam, whose husband Joseph Fisch was the Commercial Attaché of the Polish Consul in New York.

Hausner died from a brief illness in Assutah Hospital in Tel Aviv on August 8, 1938. The funeral procession stopped outside the Great Synagogue, where Chief Rabbi Ben-Zion Meir Hai Uziel spoke. He was buried in the Old Cemetery, where D. Smilansky, Zvi Karl, Dr. R. Rosenbaum, S. Margalit, and J. Straus delivered eulogies and his son Gideon recited the doxology.
