= Gideon Hausner =

Israeli jurist and politician (1915–1990)

- גדעון האוזנר
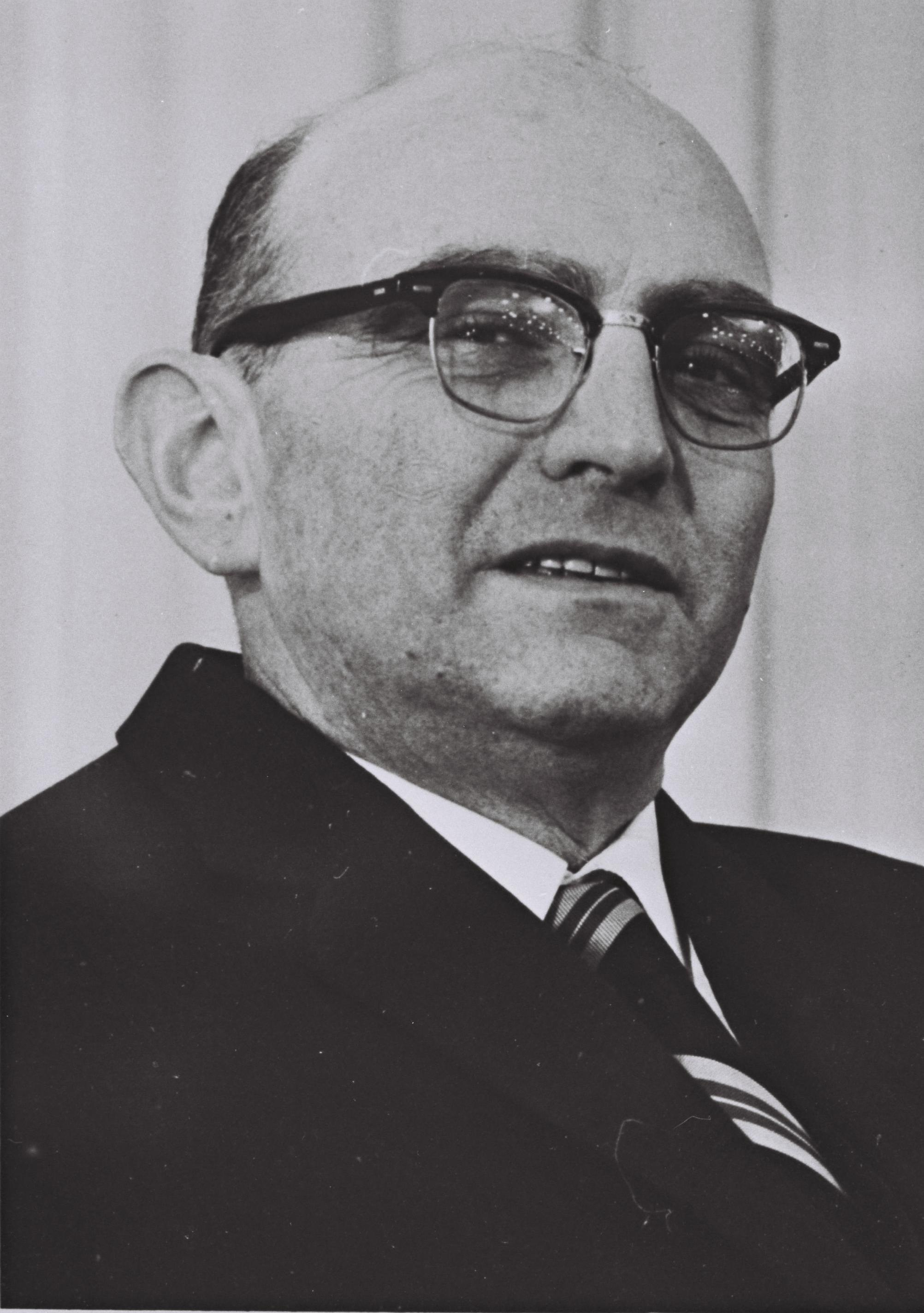

Ministerial roles
- 1974–1977: Minister without Portfolio

Faction represented in the Knesset
- 1965–1974: Independent Liberals
- 1977–1981: Independent Liberals

Other roles
- 1960–1963: Attorney General

Personal details
- Born: 26 September 1915 Lemberg, Austria-Hungary
- Died: 15 November 1990 (aged 75) Jerusalem, Israel
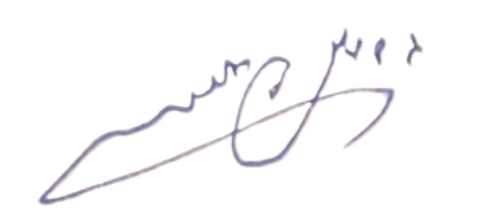
- Signature

Gideon Max Hausner (Hebrew: גדעון מקס האוזנר; 26 September 1915 – 15 November 1990) was an Israeli jurist and politician. Between 1960 and 1963, he served as Attorney General and was later elected to the Knesset and served in the cabinet. Hausner is most widely known for heading the team of prosecutors at the war crimes trial of Adolf Eichmann in Jerusalem in 1961.

Hausner is generally credited with exposing the Holocaust to the world in bold cross-examinations of Eichmann, but was criticized for showmanship. His judicial skill also set the precedent that the defense "I was only following orders" is not valid if such orders are wholly criminal and illegal. The prosecution succeeded in proving Eichmann's guilt, and Eichmann was found guilty on all charges, including crimes against humanity and crimes against the Jewish people. Eichmann was sentenced to death.

== Biography ==
Hausner was born in Lemberg (now Lviv), then the capital of Galicia, a province of Austria-Hungary (now Ukraine), to Polish-Jewish economist rabbi and Zionist Bernard Hausner, who was later a member of the Polish Sejm (parliament). He immigrated to Mandatory Palestine from Poland in 1927, when his father took the post of Economic Advisor to the Polish Government, first in Haifa and later in Tel Aviv. Hausner attended high school in Tel Aviv, before studying philosophy at the Hebrew University of Jerusalem, and then law at the Jerusalem Law School. He spoke Polish, Hebrew, Yiddish, English, and German.

He was a member of the Haganah, and during the 1948 Arab-Israeli War, he served in the Etzioni Brigade. After the war, he worked as a military prosecutor, and then as president of the military court.

In 1960, he was appointed Attorney General, but resigned from the post in 1963 and pursued a career in politics. He was elected to the Knesset in 1965 as a member of the Independent Liberals, having previously been active in the Progressive Party (the Independent Liberals were a breakaway group of mostly Progressive Party members following the party's merger into Gahal). He was re-elected in 1969 and 1973, and resigned from the Knesset upon being appointed a Minister without Portfolio in 1974 as part of Golda Meir's cabinet. Re-elected in 1977 as the only member of the party, he lost his seat in the 1981 elections when the party failed to cross the electoral threshold.

He was also the chairman of the council of Yad Vashem (1969–1989).

He was married to Judith; they had two children: Tamar, and Amos. His daughter is Tami Raveh-Hausner, chairwoman of HaHadashot 12; she is married to advocate Yehuda Raveh.

=== Commemoration ===
A Jewish school in Palo Alto, California is named after Hausner. Streets were named after him in Jerusalem, Kiryat Motzkin, Rehovot, Be'er Sheva and in the Galil-Yam neighborhood in Herzliya.

In 2024, David Serero adapted the Trial of Eichmann as a play in New York and starred as Gideon Hausner.

== Bibliography ==
- Justice in Jerusalem. New York: Harper & Row. 1966.
- Holocaust on Trial (in Hebrew). Tel Aviv: `Am `oved. 1988. ISBN 965-13-0478-2.
