= Zvi Nir =

Israeli writer, poet, lawyer, and politician

Tsvika Nir
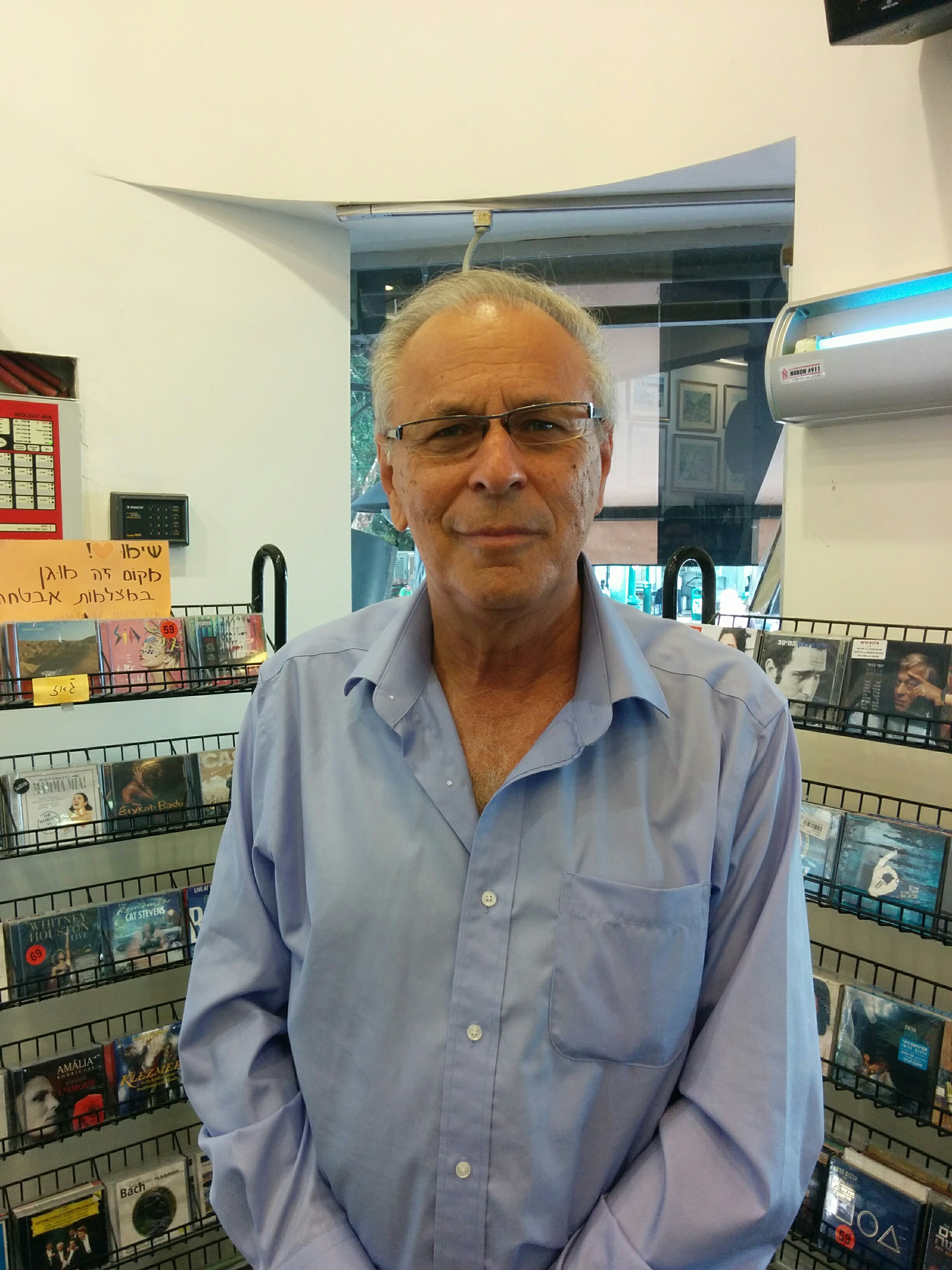

Faction represented in the Knesset
- 1996: Labor Party

Personal details
- Born: 14 August 1946 (age 80) Cluj-Napoca, Romania
- Party: Independent Liberals; Shinui; Labor

Tsvika Nir (Hebrew: צביקה ניר; born 14 August 1946) is an Israeli writer, poet, lawyer and former politician. He briefly served as a member of the Knesset in 1996 and is currently chairman of the Hebrew Writers Association in Israel.

== Biography ==
Nir was born in Cluj-Napoca, Romania in August 1946 and immigrated to Israel in 1948. His father Samuel was forcibly recruited to the Hungarian Army during World War II and spent time as a prisoner at a forced labor camp. His mother Hannah was a survivor of Auschwitz concentration camp. His younger and only brother, Amos, was killed in action in the Yom Kippur War.

Nir grew up in Kiryat Tiv'on and in 1958 moved to Ramat Gan where he graduated from Ohel Shem high school. He went on to study law at Tel Aviv University and has been a practicing lawyer since 1974. In 1973 Nir married Dalia, a high school teacher. He has three daughters, and is a grandfather of six.

== Political career ==
Nir was originally a member of the Independent Liberals, and was fourth on the party's list for the 1977 Knesset elections, but failed to win a seat as the party received just one mandate. He later joined Shinui, and was third on the party's list for the 1988 elections, in which it won two seats.

Prior to the 1992 elections he joined the Labor Party, and although he failed to win a seat, he entered the Knesset on 21 May 1996 as a replacement for Ora Namir, who had resigned to take up the post of ambassador to China and Mongolia. However, he lost his seat in the June elections, and did not even have time to take his oath of allegiance. He was later elected to Ramat Gan city council as an independent, and ran unsuccessfully for mayor in 2003. Nir served 30 years on the Ramat Gan city council (until 2013), including a term as Deputy Mayor for Culture.

== Literary career ==
Nir's first published work was a 1993 book of children's poems dedicated to his three daughters. In 2005 he gained a master's degree in general literature from Tel Aviv University. His first full-length novel, The Hand that Executed Me was published in 2012, followed by Time of the Heart (2013) and Truth (2016). In 2017 he published his first poetry book Otthon, which was followed by God of Burning Desires in 2019. In 2015 he became chairman of the Hebrew Writers Association in Israel.
