= Ora Namir =

Israeli politician and diplomat (1930–2019)

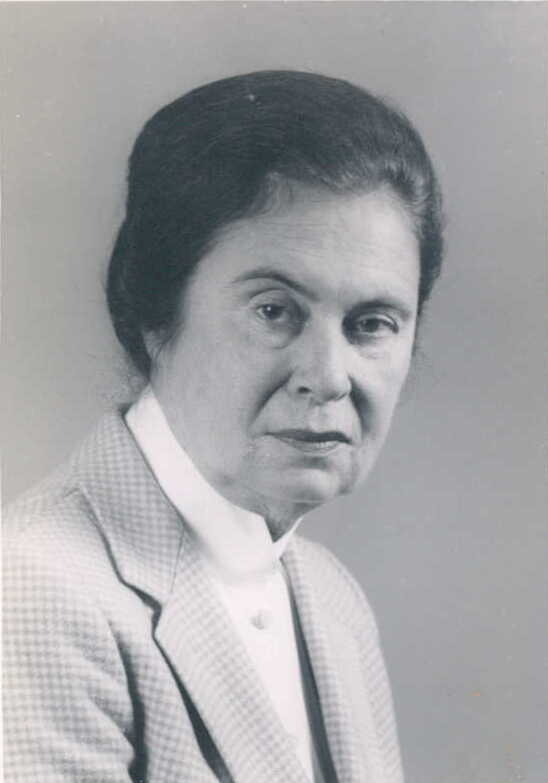
- Nair during her time in the Knesset

Ministerial roles
- 1992: Minister of the Environment
- 1992–1996: Minister of Labour & Social Welfare

Faction represented in the Knesset
- 1974–1991: Alignment
- 1991–1996: Labor Party

Personal details
- Born: 1 September 1930 Hadera, Mandatory Palestine
- Died: 7 July 2019 (aged 88) Tel Aviv, Israel

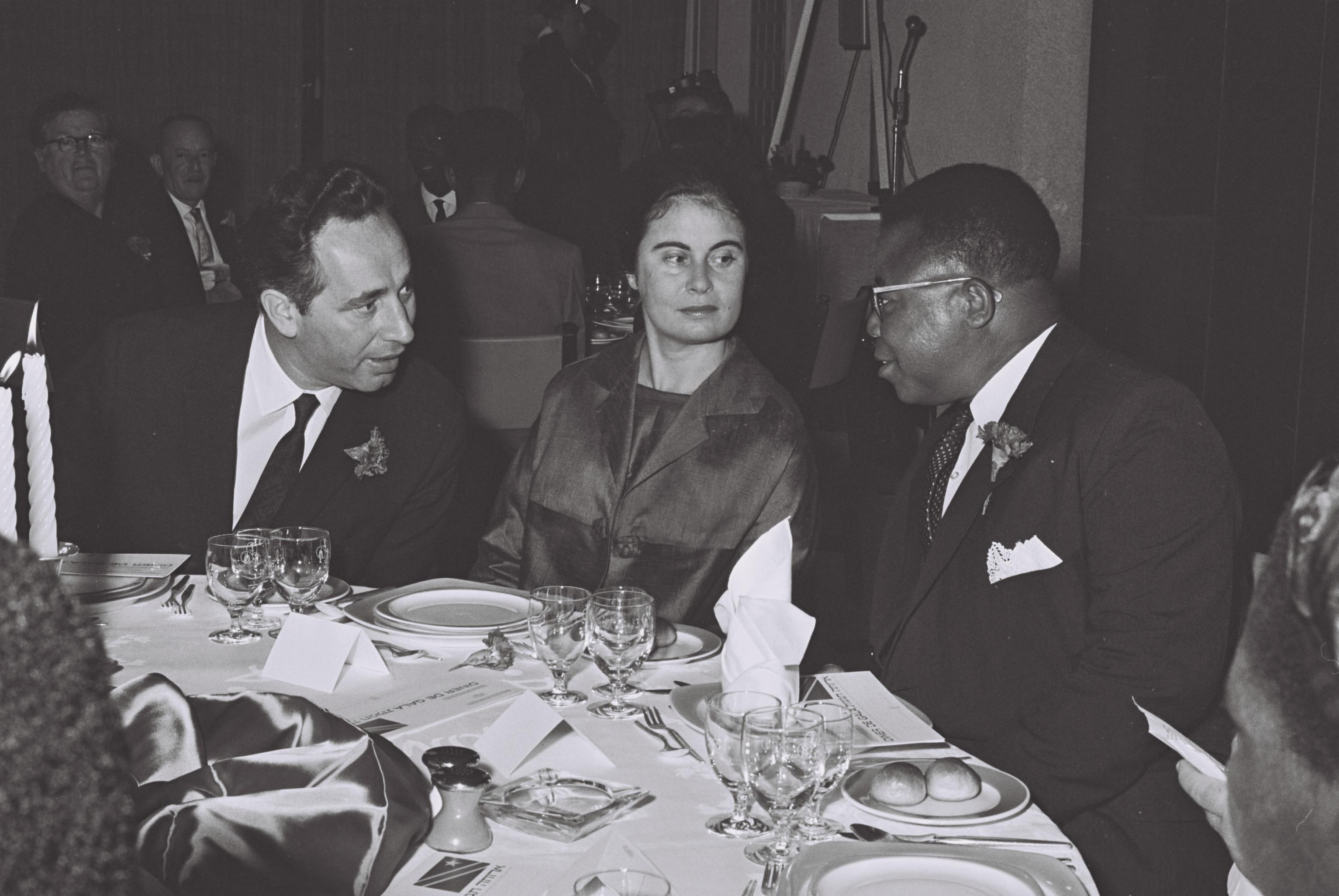
Namir and Deputy Defense Minister Shimon Peres with Congolese president Joseph Kasa-Vubu at a dinner in his honor in Tel Aviv in 1963

Ora Namir (Hebrew: אורה נמיר; 1 September 1930 – 7 July 2019) was an Israeli politician and diplomat who served as a member of the Knesset from 1974 until 1996, as well as holding the posts of Minister of the Environment and Minister of Labour and Social Welfare during the 1990s. She later became the country's ambassador to China and Mongolia.

== Biography ==
Namir was born in Hadera in 1930, during the Mandate era. She served as an officer in the IDF during the 1948 Arab–Israeli War, before studying classics and English literature at Hunter College in New York City. She married Mordechai Namir, a politician who served as mayor of Tel Aviv and Minister of Labour, 33 years her senior.

Namir served as secretary of Mapai's parliamentary group and the coalition administration during the second Knesset (1951–55), before becoming secretary to the Israeli delegation at the United Nations. Between 1967 and 1974 she was secretary-general of the Na'amat organisation's Tel Aviv branch.

In 1973 Namir was elected to the Knesset on the Alignment's list, and served as chairwoman of the Prime Minister's Committee for the Examination of the Status of Women in Israel from 1975 until 1978.

Re-elected in 1977, 1981, 1984 and 1988, Namir ran in the Labor Party leadership election in 1992, but came fourth. After retaining her seat in the 1992 elections she was appointed Minister of the Environment in Yitzhak Rabin's government, but was unpopular with staff in the ministry. In December that year she became Minister of Labour and Social Welfare (Rabin had kept the position free in the hope of attracting one of the ultra-orthodox parties to join the coalition), a role she retained when Shimon Peres formed a new government following Rabin's assassination.

On 21 May 1996 she resigned from the Knesset and the cabinet to become ambassador to China and non-resident ambassador to Mongolia, roles she held until 2000. Her Knesset seat was taken by Zvi Nir. After returning to Israel she joined the One Nation party, and was placed fifth on its list for the 2003 elections. However, the party won only three seats.

Namir died at her home in Tel Aviv on 7 July 2019.
