= Yizhar Harari =

Israeli politician

- יִזְהַר הֲרָרִי
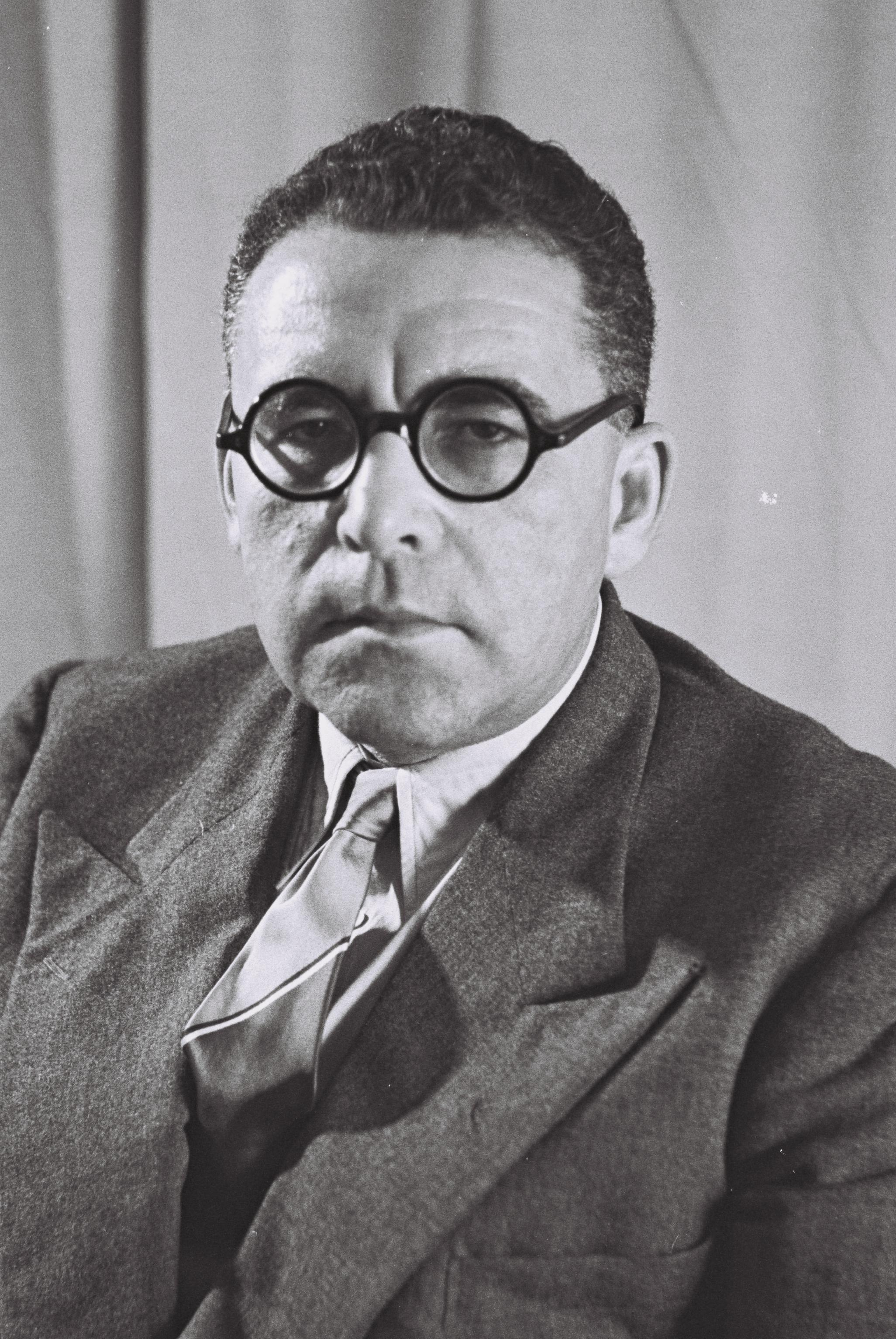

Faction represented in the Knesset
- 1949–1961: Progressive Party
- 1961–1965: Liberal Party
- 1965–1968: Independent Liberals
- 1968–1969: Labor Party
- 1969–1974: Alignment

Personal details
- Born: 16 July 1908 Jaffa, Ottoman Empire
- Died: 1 February 1978 (aged 69)

Yizhar Harari (Hebrew: יִזְהַר הֲרָרִי; 16 July 1908 – 1 February 1978) was a Zionist activist and Israeli politician.

== Biography ==
Yizhar Harari was born in Jaffa, then under Ottoman rule, to Haim and Yehudit Harari. He studied political science and journalism at the University of Paris and then law at the Hebrew University of Jerusalem and economics and political science in London, and was certified as a lawyer. His son, Haim Harari, is a physicist. His nephew, Yuval Ne'eman, was also a physicist who went into politics.

== Journalism and political career ==
In 1933, he worked as a journalist for Haaretz newspaper in London. He was a delegate to several Zionist Congresses, a member of the Zionist Actions Committee. From 1945 to 1949 he was a member of the Supreme Committee to Manage Illegal Immigration. He was a member of Supreme Command of the Haganah and later a lieutenant colonel in the IDF.

He was elected to the first through fourth Knessets for the Progressive Party, which later merged into the Israeli Liberal Party, for which he was elected to the fifth Knesset. During the fifth Knesset he refused to accept his party's merger into Gahal and, along with six other members (including Moshe Kol), formed the Independent Liberals party. In 1968, Harari resigned from the Independent Liberals and joined the Labor Party, which merged into the Alignment, for which he was elected to the seventh Knesset. He was chairman of the House Committee during the first Knesset, and was also member of the Foreign Affairs & Defense Committee and the Constitution, Law and Justice Committee.

=== Harari Resolution ===
Harari is best known as initiator of the Harari Resolution (הַחְלָטַת הֲרָרִי; also referred to as the Harari Proposal) of 13 June 1950, a landmark in Israeli constitutional law. According to this proposal "the First Knesset assigns to the Constitution, Law and Justice Committee the preparation of a proposed constitution for the state. The constitution will be made up of chapters, each of which will constitute a separate basic law. The chapters will be brought to the Knesset, as the Committee completes its work, and all the chapters together will constitute the constitution of the state." Following the passing of this resolution, the Constitution, Law and Justice Committee set up a sub-committee on the Constitution. Several Basic Laws have been enacted since, and yet Israel still has no formal constitution.
