= Davidson Institute of Science Education =

The Davidson Institute of Science Education is a public nonprofit organization aimed at promoting and nurturing the scientific, mathematical and technological education in Israel. Serving as the educational arm of the Weizmann Institute of Science, the Davidson Institute develops, evaluates and provides a wide variety of educational programs for teaching and learning science and mathematics at all ages and levels. It is located on campus of the Weizmann Institute in Rehovot.

== History ==
The Davidson Institute for Science Education was established by Haim Harari (who has been the institute's chair of the board ever since) in 1999, following a large endowment gift from William (Bill) Davidson and contributions from other donors. Science education activities started at the Weizmann Institute in the early 1960s. Over the decades, these activities led to the creation of an academic department of Science Teaching at the Weizmann Institute and, in parallel, to an ever expanding array of educational field activities aimed at schools, teachers, students and the general public. The success and proliferation of these programs eventually required the establishment of a separate, non-profit entity with dedicated to such activities, with a strong scientific linkage to the Weizmann Institute.

== Activities ==
Davidson Institute's formal programs target different target groups such as outstanding gifted students, entire school classes and their teachers, youth at risk, underachieving youth, math and science teachers, young talented students from abroad and the general public of all ages. Extracurricular activities include afternoon science clubs, science Olympiads and competitions, public science lectures, national and international science camps, annual events, and the Clore Garden of Science outdoor museum. Providing science education programs for all ages gives the Davidson Institute a holistic perspective of Life Long Learning and a special understanding of the needs of the various segments of Israeli society. Activities are conducted in Hebrew, English, Arabic, and Spanish. Weizmann Institute's researchers and graduate students are actively involved in all Davidson Institute's programs.

== See also ==
- Science and technology in Israel
