= Rishon model =

Proposed model in particle physics

The Harari–Shupe preon model (also known as rishon model, RM) is the earliest effort to develop a preon model to explain the phenomena appearing in the Standard Model (SM) of particle physics. It was first developed independently by Haim Harari and by Michael A. Shupe and later expanded by Harari and his then-student Nathan Seiberg.

== Model ==
The model has two kinds of fundamental particles called rishons (ראשון, rishon means "first" in Hebrew). They are T ("Third" since it has an electric charge of +1/3 e), or Tohu and V ("Vanishes", since it is electrically neutral), or Vohu. The terms tohu and vohu are picked from the Biblical phrase Tohu va-Vohu, for which the King James Version translation is "without form, and void". All leptons and all flavours of quarks are three-rishon ordered triplets. These groups of three rishons have spin-1/2. They are as follows:

- TTT = positron (anti-electron);
- VVV = electron neutrino;
- TTV, TVT and VTT = three colours of up quarks;
- VVT, VTV and TVV = three colours of down antiquarks.

Each rishon has a corresponding antiparticle. Hence:

- T̅T̅T̅ = electron;
- V̅V̅V̅ = electron antineutrino;
- T̅T̅V̅, T̅V̅T̅, V̅T̅T̅ = three colours of up antiquarks;
- V̅V̅T̅, V̅T̅V̅, T̅V̅V̅ = three colours of down quarks.

The W^{+} boson = TTTVVV; The W^{−} boson = T̅T̅T̅V̅V̅V̅.

Note that:

- Matter and antimatter are equally abundant in nature in the RM. This still leaves open the question of why T̅T̅T̅, T̅V̅V̅, and TTV etc. are common whereas TTT, TVV, and T̅T̅V̅ etc. are rare.
- Higher generation leptons and quarks are presumed to be excited states of first generation leptons and quarks, but those states are not specified.
- The simple RM does not provide an explanation of the mass-spectrum of the leptons and quarks.

Baryon number (B) and lepton number (L) are not conserved, but the quantity B − L is conserved. A baryon number violating process (such as proton decay) in the model would be

d	+	u	+	u	→	d	+	d̅	+	e^{+}	Fermion-level interaction
V̅V̅T̅	+	TVT	+	VTT	→	V̅V̅T̅	+	VVT	+	TTT	Rishon-level interaction
p					→	π^{0}			+	e^{+}	Appearance in a particle detector

In the expanded Harari–Seiberg version the rishons possess color and hypercolor, explaining why the only composites are the observed quarks and leptons. Under certain assumptions, it is possible to show that the model allows exactly for three generations of quarks and leptons.

== Evidence ==
Currently, there is no scientific evidence for the existence of substructure within quarks and leptons, but there is no profound reason why such a substructure may not be revealed at shorter distances. In 2008, Piotr Zenczykowski (Żenczykowski) has derived the RM by starting from a non-relativistic O(6) phase space. Such model is based on fundamental principles and the structure of Clifford algebras, and fully recovers the RM by naturally explaining several obscure and otherwise artificial features of the original model.

== In popular culture ==
- Science fiction author Vonda McIntyre, in her novelizations of the scripts of the movies Star Trek II: The Wrath of Khan and Star Trek III: The Search for Spock suggested that the Genesis effect was a result of a newly discovered rishon-like substructure to matter.
- Science fiction author James P. Hogan in his novel Voyage from Yesteryear explicitly postulated a rishon-like model in the development of antimatter weapons and energy sources.
