= Independent Liberals (Israel) =

Defunct Israeli political party

Independent Liberals ליברלים עצמאיים
- President: Pinchas Rosen; Moshe Kol; Gideon Hausner; Yitzhak Artzi; Zvi Nir
- Founded: 16 March 1965
- Dissolved: 1992
- Split from: Liberal Party
- Merged into: Labor Party
- Ideology: Liberalism (Israeli); Social liberalism Progressivism; Secularism
- Political position: Center
- International affiliation: Liberal International
- Most MKs: 7 (1965)
- Fewest MKs: 1 (1977–1981;1984-1988)

Election symbol
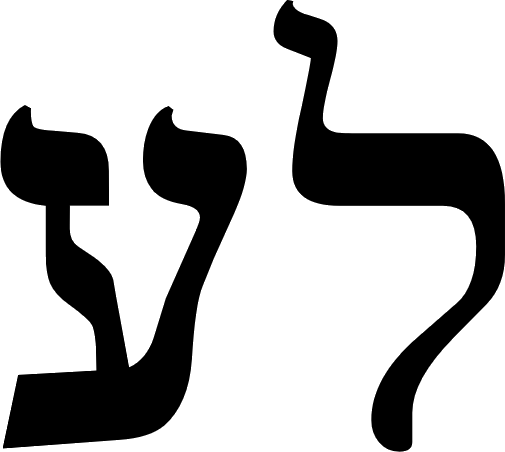

The Independent Liberals (Hebrew: ליברלים עצמאיים, Libralim Atzma'im) were a political party in Israel that existed between 1965 and 1992.

== History ==
The Independent Liberals party was formed during the fifth Knesset in the aftermath of the merger of the Liberal Party and Herut. Seven of the 17 Liberal Party MKs led by former Minister of Justice, Pinchas Rosen, disagreed with the merger and founded a new party in response. Almost all of the dissenters were former members of the Progressive Party, which had merged with the General Zionists to create the Liberal Party during the fourth Knesset, and also included Rachel Cohen-Kagan, formerly an MK for Women's International Zionist Organization.

The party agreed to have the Israeli participation in Liberal International shared equally with the Liberal Party.

Its constituency was overwhelmingly of European origin.

In their first electoral test, the 1965 legislative election, the Independent Liberals won 5 seats and joined Levi Eshkol and Golda Meir's coalition governments, with Moshe Kol appointed Minister of Tourism and Minister of Development. During the sixth Knesset they lost one seat when Yizhar Harari left the party to join the Alignment.

In the 1969 election the party won four seats and were again included in Meir's coalition government. Kol retained his post as Minister of Tourism. The party also won four seats in the 1973 election and were included in both of Meir and Yitzhak Rabin's coalition governments. Kol again retained his post as Minister of Tourism and Gideon Hausner was made a Minister without Portfolio. However, they lost one seat when Hillel Seidel defected to Likud.

The 1977 election saw the party win only one seat, barely crossing the 1% electoral threshold (they received 1.3% of the vote). The party was also excluded from Menachem Begin's right-wing coalition. The 1981 election saw the party fail to cross the electoral threshold and disappear from the Knesset. For the 1984 election the party ran as a faction of the Alignment, with Independent Liberals leader Yitzhak Artzi given 44th place on the Alignment electoral list.

On 15 March 1988, near the end of the 11th Knesset, Artzi left the Alignment and joined the Shinui parliamentary group. In the 1988 election, the Independent Liberals ran together with Shinui and the Liberal Center (a group of former Likud Liberals); the three groups indicated they would cooperate rather than formally merge, pending the 1988 campaign, at which a combined list under the Shinui–Center Movement banner was presented. However, the list won only two seats and none were for Independent Liberal members. The Independent Liberal party merged with the Israeli Labor Party in 1992.

== Leaders ==
Leader	Took office	Left office
Pinchas Rosen	1965	1968
Moshe Kol	1968	1977
Gideon Hausner	1977	1981
Yitzhak Artzi	1981	1988
Zvi Nir	1988	1992

== Election results ==
Election	Leader	Votes	%	Position	Seats	+/–	Outcome
1965	Pinchas Rosen	45,299	3.75	▲6th	5 / 120	–	Coalition
1969	Moshe Kol	43,933	3.21	5th	4 / 120	▼1	Coalition
1973	Moshe Kol	56,560	3.61	5th	4 / 120	Steady	Coalition
1977	Gideon Hausner	20,384	1.17	▼13th	1 / 120	▼3	Opposition
1981	Yitzhak Artzi	11,764	0.61	▲12th	0 / 120	▼1	Extraparliamentary
1984	Yitzhak Artzi	Part of the Alignment			1 / 120	▲1	Coalition
1988	Zvi Nir	Part of Centre-Shinui			0 / 120	▼1	Extraparliamentary
