= Juansher Chkareuli =

Georgian theoretical physicist (born 1940)

Juansher (Jon) Chkareuli
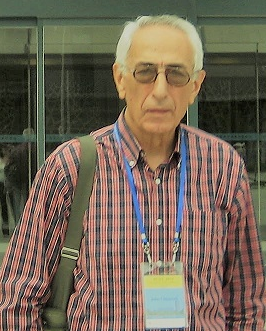
- Born: January 13, 1940 (age 86); Tbilisi, Georgia, USSR
- Education: Tbilisi State University
- Known for: Family symmetries, extended grand unified theories, emergent gauge and gravity theories
- Scientific career
- Fields: Theoretical particle physics
- Workplaces: Andronikashvili Institute of Physics, Tbilisi State University & Institute of Theoretical Physics, Ilia State University
- Doctoral advisors: Sergei Matinyan; Victor Ogievetsky
- Doctoral students: Giorgi Dvali

Juansher Chkareuli (Georgian: ჯუანშერ ჩქარეული; born January 13, 1940) is a Georgian theoretical physicist working in particle physics, Head of Particle Physics Department at Andronikashvili Institute of Physics of Tbilisi State University and Professor at Institute of Theoretical Physics of Ilia State University in Tbilisi.

== Academic career ==
He studied at Tbilisi State University and Lebedev Physical Institute (Moscow), and received MSc in Theoretical Physics in 1965. He completed his PhD in 1970 and DSc in 1985 in Andronikashvili Institute of Physics (Tbilisi) and Joint Institute for Nuclear Research (Russia).

Subsequently, he worked as Principal Research Fellow at Andronikashvili Institute of Physics (1985–present); Professor of Theoretical Physics at Tbilisi State University (1986-1990); Professor of Theoretical Physics at Ilia State University (2006–present).

In 1991-2012 he was also a Visiting research professor at many leading centers in high energy physics including European Organization for Nuclear Research (CERN) in Geneva, International Center for Theoretical Physics (ICTP) in Trieste, Max-Planck Institute in Munich, University of Glasgow, University of Maryland, University of Melbourne, Institute of High Energy Physics in Beijing .

J.L. Chkareuli is primarily known for his works on family symmetries, extended Grand Unified Theories and emergent gauge and gravity theories. These developments include: An introduction of the chiral family symmetry SU(3) for quark-lepton generations and its application to the flavor mixing of quarks and leptons; A novel missing VEV mechanism in the supersymmetric SU(8) Grand Unified Theory suggesting a simultaneous solution to the gauge hierarchy problem and unification of flavor; New nonlinear sigma models for emergent gauge and gravity theories leading to dynamical generation of local internal and spacetime symmetries with gauge fields and gravitons as massless vector/tensor Goldstone bosons.

He is also known as President of the Georgian Physical Society (1993–99), and an organizer and co-organizer of some notable conferences and workshops on high energy physics – Annual Georgian Winter School on particle physics and cosmology (Bakuriani, Georgia, 1970–1993) which was one of the most popular scientific meetings in the former Soviet Union; International seminar "Standard Model and Beyond" (Tbilisi, 1996); International conference "Low dimensional physics and gauge principles" (Yerevan & Tbilisi, 2011) and others.

== Honours and awards ==
Royal Society Fellowship (1993–94); Royal Society Joint Project Grant (1999-2000), Georgia-US Bilateral Grant (2003-2005); Member of the American Physical Society (1993), Fellow of the Institute of Physics (UK, 2000). Listed in the biographical dictionaries including «Who is Who in Science and Engineering» (2008), Marquis Who's Who, NY; «2000 Outstanding Scientists 2008/2009» (2010), International Biographical Centre, Cambridge.
