= Preon =

Hypothetical subatomic particle

In particle physics, preons are hypothetical point particles, conceived of as sub-components of quarks and leptons. The word "preon" was coined by Jogesh Pati and Abdus Salam, in 1974. Interest in preon models peaked in the 1980s but has slowed, as the Standard Model of particle physics continues to describe physics mostly successfully, and no direct experimental evidence for lepton and quark compositeness has been found.

Preons were postulated to come in four varieties: plus, anti-plus, zero, and anti-zero. W bosons have six preons, and quarks and leptons have only three.

In the hadronic sector, some effects are considered anomalies within the Standard Model; for example, the proton spin puzzle, the EMC effect, the distributions of electric charges inside the nucleons, as found by Robert Hofstadter in 1956, and the ad hoc CKM matrix elements.

When the term "preon" was coined, it was primarily to explain the two families of spin-1/2 fermions: quarks and leptons. More recent preon models also account for spin-1 bosons, and are still called "preons". Each of the preon models postulates a set of fewer fundamental particles than those of the Standard Model, together with the rules governing how those fundamental particles combine and interact. Based on these rules, the preon models try to explain the Standard Model, often predicting small discrepancies with this model and generating new particles and certain phenomena which do not belong to the Standard Model.

== Goals of preon models ==
Preon research is motivated by the desire to:

- Reduce the large number of particles, many that differ only in charge, to a smaller number of more fundamental particles. For example, the down quark and up quark are nearly identical except for charge, and a slight mass difference; preon research is motivated by explaining that quarks are composed of similar preons, with incremental differences accounting for charge. The hope is to reproduce the reductionist strategy that has worked for the periodic table of elements and the quark model of mesons and baryons.
- Explain the reason for there being exactly three generations of fermions.
- Calculate parameters that are currently unexplained by the Standard Model, such as the masses of Standard Model fundamental fermions, their electric charges, and color charges; in effect, reduce the number of model-required experimental input parameters from the number required by the Standard Model.
- Provide reasons for the very large range of mass-energy observed in supposedly fundamental particles, from the electron neutrino to the top quark.
- Provide alternative explanations for the electro-weak symmetry breaking without invoking a Higgs field, which itself possibly needs a supersymmetry to correct the theoretical problems involved with the Higgs field (further, the supersymmetric theories proposed so far have theoretical and observational problems of their own).
- Account for neutrino oscillation and apparently unique mass mechanism.
- Make new, non-repetitive predictions, such as providing cold dark matter candidates.
- Explain why there exists only the observed variety of particle species, and give a model with reasons for producing only these observed particles (since the prediction of non-observed particles is a problem with many current models, such as supersymmetry).

== Background ==
Before the Standard Model was developed in the 1970s (the key elements of the Standard Model known as quarks were proposed by Murray Gell-Mann and George Zweig in 1964), physicists observed hundreds of different kinds of particles in particle accelerators. These were organized into relationships on their physical properties in a largely ad-hoc system of hierarchies, not entirely unlike the way taxonomy grouped animals based on their physical features. Not surprisingly, the huge number of particles was referred to as the "particle zoo".

The Standard Model, which is now the prevailing model of particle physics, dramatically simplified this picture by showing that most of the observed particles were mesons, which are combinations of two quarks, or baryons which are combinations of three quarks, plus a handful of other particles. The particles being seen in the ever-more-powerful accelerators were, according to the theory, typically nothing more than combinations of these quarks.

=== Comparisons of quarks, leptons, and bosons ===
Within the Standard Model, there are several classes of particles. One of these, the quarks, has six types, of which there are three varieties in each (dubbed "colors", red, green, and blue, giving rise to quantum chromodynamics).

Additionally, there are six different types of what are known as leptons. Of these six leptons, there are three charged particles: the electron, muon, and tau. The neutrinos comprise the other three leptons, and each neutrino pairs with one of the three charged leptons.

In the Standard Model, there are also bosons, including the photons and gluons; W^{+}, W^{−}, and Z bosons; and the Higgs boson; and an open space left for the graviton. Almost all of these particles come in "left-handed" and "right-handed" versions (see Chirality). The quarks, leptons, and W boson all have antiparticles with opposite electric charge (or in the case of the neutrinos, opposite weak isospin).

=== Unresolved problems with the Standard Model ===
The Standard Model also has a number of problems which have not been entirely solved. In particular, no successful theory of gravitation based on a particle theory has yet been proposed. Although the Model assumes the existence of a graviton, all attempts to produce a consistent theory based on them have failed.

Kalman asserts that, according to the concept of atomism, fundamental building blocks of nature are indivisible bits of matter that are ungenerated and indestructible. Neither leptons nor quarks are truly indestructible, since some leptons can decay into other leptons, some quarks into other quarks. Thus, on fundamental grounds, quarks are not themselves fundamental building blocks, but must be composed of other, fundamental quantities—preons. Although the mass of each successive particle follows certain patterns, predictions of the rest mass of most particles cannot be made precisely, except for the masses of almost all baryons which have been modeled well by de Souza (2010).

The Standard Model also has problems predicting the large scale structure of the universe. For instance, the Standard Model generally predicts equal amounts of matter and antimatter in the universe. A number of attempts have been made to "fix" this through a variety of mechanisms, but to date none have won widespread support. Likewise, basic adaptations of the Model suggest the presence of proton decay, which has not yet been observed.

=== Motivation for preon models ===
Several models have been proposed in an attempt to provide a more fundamental explanation of the results in experimental and theoretical particle physics, using names such as "parton" or "preon" for the hypothetical basic particle constituents.

Preon theory is motivated by a desire to replicate in particle physics the achievements of the periodic table in Chemistry, which reduced 94 naturally occurring elements to combinations of just three building-blocks (proton, neutron, electron). Likewise, the Standard Model later organized the "particle zoo" of hadrons by reducing several dozen particles to combinations at a more fundamental level of (at first) just three quarks, consequently reducing the huge number of arbitrary constants in mid-twentieth-century particle physics prior to the Standard Model and quantum chromodynamics.

However, the particular preon model discussed below has attracted comparatively little interest among the particle physics community to date, in part because no evidence has been obtained so far in collider experiments to show that the fermions of the Standard Model are composite.

=== Attempts ===
A number of physicists have attempted to develop a theory of "pre-quarks" (from which the name preon derives) in an effort to justify theoretically the many parts of the Standard Model that are known only through experimental data. Other names which have been used for these proposed fundamental particles (or particles intermediate between the most fundamental particles and those observed in the Standard Model) include prequarks, subquarks, maons, alphons, quinks, rishons, tweedles, helons, haplons, Y-particles, and primons. Preon is the leading name in the physics community.

Efforts to develop a substructure date at least as far back as 1974 with a paper by Pati and Salam in Physical Review. Other attempts include a 1977 paper by Terazawa, Chikashige, and Akama, similar, but independent, 1979 papers by Ne'eman, Harari, and Shupe, a 1981 paper by Fritzsch and Mandelbaum, and a 1992 book by D'Souza and Kalman. None of these have gained wide acceptance in the physics world. However, in a recent work de Souza has shown that his model describes well all weak decays of hadrons according to selection rules dictated by a quantum number derived from his compositeness model. In his model leptons are elementary particles and each quark is composed of two primons, and thus, all quarks are described by four primons. Therefore, there is no need for the Standard Model Higgs boson and each quark mass is derived from the interaction between each pair of primons by means of three Higgs-like bosons.

In his 1989 Nobel Prize acceptance lecture, Hans Dehmelt described a most fundamental elementary particle, with definable properties, which he called the cosmon, as the likely result of a long but finite chain of increasingly more elementary particles.

=== Composite Higgs ===
Many preon models either do not account for the Higgs boson or rule it out, and propose that electro-weak symmetry is broken not by a scalar Higgs field but by composite preons. For example, Fredriksson preon theory does not need the Higgs boson, and explains the electro-weak breaking as the rearrangement of preons, rather than a Higgs-mediated field. In fact, the Fredriksson preon model and the de Souza model predict that the Standard Model Higgs boson does not exist. However, this is in direct conflict with the discovery of the Higgs boson, suggesting an issue with the theories.

== Rishon model ==
The rishon model is the earliest effort (1979) to develop a preon model to explain the phenomenon appearing in the Standard Model of particle physics. It was first developed by Haim Harari and Michael A. Shupe (independently of each other), and later expanded by Harari and his then-student Nathan Seiberg.

The model has two kinds of fundamental particles called rishons (Hebrew: ראשונים, romanized: rishonim, "first"). They are T ("Third" since it has an electric charge of 1/3 e, or tohu (תוהו, "chaos", i.e. the state of the universe before the creation of light) and V ("Vanishes", since it is electrically neutral, or בוהו, vohu, "void"). All leptons and all flavours of quarks are three-rishon ordered triplets. These groups of three rishons have spin 1/2.

The Rishon model illustrates some of the typical efforts in the field. Many of the preon models theorize that the apparent imbalance of matter and antimatter in the universe is in fact illusory, with large quantities of preon-level antimatter confined within more complex structures.

== Criticisms ==
=== Mass paradox ===
One preon model started as an internal paper at the Collider Detector at Fermilab (CDF) around 1994. The paper was written after an unexpected and inexplicable excess of jets with energies above 200 GeV were detected in the 1992–1993 running period. However, scattering experiments have shown that quarks and leptons are "point like" down to distance scales of less than 10^{−18} m (or 1/1000 of a proton diameter). The momentum uncertainty of a preon (of whatever mass) confined to a box of this size is about 200 GeV/c, which is 50000 times larger than the (model dependent) rest mass of an up-quark, and 400000 times larger than the rest mass of an electron.

Heisenberg's uncertainty principle states that $\operatorname{\Delta} x \cdot \operatorname{\Delta} p \ge \tfrac{1}{2}\hbar$ (that is, the dot product of the uncertainty of a particle's position and momentum cannot be less than half the reduced Planck constant) and thus anything confined to a box smaller than $\operatorname{\Delta} x$ would have a momentum uncertainty proportionally greater. For preons confined within quarks or leptons (Δx ≈ 10^{−18} m), this implies kinetic energies around 200 GeV—far exceeding observed quark and lepton masses.

So the preon model represents a mass paradox: How could quarks or electrons be made of smaller particles that would have many orders of magnitude greater mass-energies arising from their enormous momenta? One way of resolving this paradox is to postulate a large binding force between preons that cancels their mass-energies. For example, some models propose a "hyperstrong" interaction around 100,000 times stronger than the nuclear strong force to negate the preons' kinetic contributions.

=== Conflicts with observed physics ===
Preon models propose additional unobserved forces or dynamics to account for the observed properties of elementary particles, which may have implications in conflict with observation. For example, now that the LHC's observation of a Higgs boson is confirmed, the observation contradicts the predictions of many preon models that excluded it.

Preon theories require quarks and leptons to have a finite size. It is possible that the Large Hadron Collider will observe this after it is upgraded to higher energies.

== See also ==
- Preon star – Hypothetical types of stars
- Rishon model – Proposed model in particle physics
- Technicolor (physics) – Hypothetical model through which W and Z bosons acquire mass
