= Haim Harari =

Israeli theoretical physicist (born 1940)

- חיים הררי
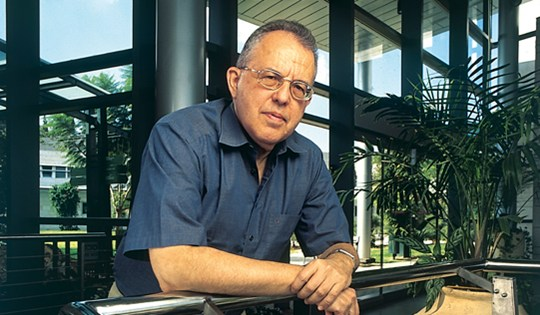
- Haim Harari
- Born: November 18, 1940 (age 85); Jerusalem, Mandatory Palestine
- Education: Hebrew University of Jerusalem (M.Sc. and Ph.D. in Physics)
- Occupation: theoretical physicist
- Known for: President of the Weizmann Institute of Science
- Parents: Yizhar Harari (father); Dina Neumann (mother)
- Awards: Rothschild Prize in Physics (1976); Israel Prize, in the exact sciences (1989); The EMET Prize for Art, Science and Culture in Education (2004); "Higher Education Prize" by the Israeli Council for Higher Education (2021); Commander Cross of the Order of Merit presented by the President of Germany; Harnack Medal from the Max Planck Institute (2001); "Cross of Honor, Science and Art, First Class" presented by Austria; Golden cross of honor for service to the land of Lower Austria (2011)

Haim Harari (Hebrew: חיים הררי; born 18 November 1940) is an Israeli theoretical physicist who has made contributions in particle physics, science education, and other fields. He was the President of the Weizmann Institute of Science from 1988 to 2001.

== Biography ==
Haim Harari was born in Jerusalem, in what is now Israel. His family has lived in the area which is now Israel for five generations. His parents were Knesset member Yizhar Harari and Dina Neumann. Harari received his M.Sc. and Ph.D. in Physics from Hebrew University of Jerusalem. Harari is married to Elfi. He has three children, four grandchildren, and two great-grandchildren. He lives at the Weizmann Institute campus in Rehovot, Israel.

== Academic career ==
In 1967, after completing his Ph.D, he became the youngest professor ever at the Weizmann Institute. He has been the founder and first chairman of the Board (1999-2015) of the Davidson Institute of Science Education at the Weizmann Institute. Harari is also the founding Chairman (2002-2022) of the Management Committee of the Weizmann Global Endowment Management Trust in New York, an organization managing the endowments of the various independent international bodies supporting the Weizmann Institute of Science. In 1979 he was elected as Chairman of the Planning and Budgeting Committee (PBC) of the Council of Higher Education, serving two terms until 1985. During his tenure as chairman of the PBC, he established the Israel Inter-University Computation Center (IUCC) and laid the foundations for the university computer network in Israel. He was the President, from 1988 to 2001, of the Weizmann Institute of Science. During his presidency, the Weizmann Institute, entirely dedicated to basic research, became one of the leading royalty earning academic research organizations in the world.

Harari has made major contributions to three different fields: particle physics research on the international scene, science education in the Israeli school system and science administration and policy making.

Harari coined the name of the top and bottom quarks, predicted in 1973 by Kobayashi and Maskawa, and made the first complete statement of the standard six quarks and six leptons model of particle physics (at the Stanford 1975 Lepton-Photon Conference). He also proposed the Rishon Model, a model for a substructure of quarks and leptons, currently believed to be the most fundamental particles in nature. There is no experimental evidence yet for such substructure.

He is the co-founder (1974) of Perach, a national tutoring and mentoring project in which over 20,000 Israeli undergraduates receive a tuition fellowship in return for devoting four hours per week to a child from an underprivileged socioeconomic background. He also initiated and established in Tel Aviv (1988) a science teaching center "HEMDA", in which high school students perform all their physics studies in advanced laboratories and with highly qualified teachers, instead of pursuing the same in their own schools. Harari has been chairman of both projects, since their founding, until recently.

== Awards and recognition ==
- Membership in the Israel Academy of Sciences (1978);
- Membership in the American Academy of Arts and Sciences (2010);
- Rothschild Prize in Physics (1976);
- Fellow of the American Physical Society (1986);
- Israel Prize, in the exact sciences (1989);
- The EMET Prize for Art, Science and Culture in Education (2004);
- Commander Cross of the Order of Merit presented by the President of Germany;
- Cross of Honor, Science and Art, First Class presented by Austria;
- Golden cross of honor for service to the land of Lower Austria (2011);
- Harnack Medal from the Max Planck Institute (2001), acknowledging his contribution to co-operation between the Max Planck Society and the Weizmann Institute.
- "Higher Education Prize" by the Israeli Council for Higher Education (2021)

In 2004 Harari gave a speech entitled "A View from the Eye of the Storm" offering insights into the problems of the Middle East. He eventually turned it into a book of the same name.

== Published works ==
- A View from the Eye of the Storm: Terror and Reason in the Middle East, HarperCollins, 2005.

== See also ==
- List of Israel Prize recipients
- Harari
