= Meri (political party) =

Left-wing party in Israel (1965-1973)

Meri מר״י
- Leader: Uri Avnery
- Founded: mid 1960s
- Dissolved: 1979
- Merged into: Left Camp of Israel
- Newspaper: HaOlam HaZeh
- Ideology: Radicalism; Progressivism; Pacifism; Civil libertarianism
- Political position: Left-wing
- Most MKs: 2 (1969–1972)
- Fewest MKs: 1 (1965–1969, 1972–1973)

Election symbol
- ש

Meri (Hebrew: מר״י, lit. 'Rebellion', an abbreviation for מחנה רדיקלי ישראלי Mahaneh Radikali Yisraeli or Israeli Radical Camp) was a minor radical left-wing political party in Israel. It was founded in the 1960s as HaOlam HaZeh – Koah Hadash by Uri Avnery, editor of HaOlam HaZeh.

== History ==
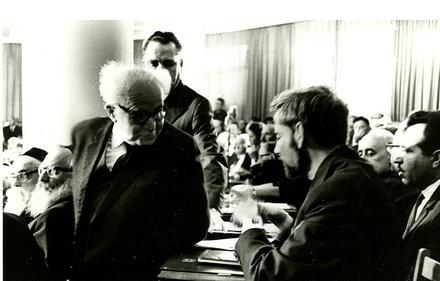
Uri Avnery in the Knesset in 1965, being stared at by David Ben-Gurion (former Prime Minister).

The party was founded by Avnery, editor and co-owner of the anti-establishment HaOlam HaZeh news magazine, following the passing of the Anti-Defamation Law in 1963. The magazine was antimilitarist and highly critical of the Israel Defense Forces, and of the governing Mapai party. Because of these stances, Avnery felt threatened by the new law, and asked readers to send letters on whether or not he should run for election, to which the overwhelming answer was yes.

The party's slogan was "liberation, partnership, equality" ("שחרור, שותפות, שוויון"), to alliterate with the party's symbol, shin (ש).

It surprisingly passed the electoral threshold in the election, gaining 1.2% of the vote and one seat, taken by Avnery. It was 1,000 votes short of winning a second seat. One of Avnery's election promises was that he would attend every single session of the Knesset, a promise which he fulfilled.

In 1968, during a speech in the Knesset, Avnery held up the flag of Palestine.

In the run-up to the 1969 election, HaOlam Hazeh was approached by the struggling communist Maki party and left-wing politician Gadi Yatziv to create a joint list, which would put Avnery at its top spot. He declined, as he saw Meri as "neither left-wing nor right-wing", and did not want to jeopardise that image by allying with the communist party.

The election saw the party pick up two seats, with fellow HaOlam HaZeh journalist and co-owner Shalom Cohen taking the second seat. During his time in the Knesset, Cohen heavily criticised the treatment of Mizrahi Jews in Israel, even tearing up his Knesset identification card.

However, Cohen did not agree with Avnery's high control of the party and tensions between the two began to grow. The party secretary, Amnon Zichron was supposed to rotate Cohen's seat. On the day of the handover, 4 January 1972, Cohen instead refused to give up his seat, and left the party. Cohen served the remainder of the Knesset session as an independent MK, whilst on 3 July 1973 Avnery renamed the party Meri.

The party included members of Aki and former members of Siah on its list for the 1973 elections, but it failed to cross the electoral threshold and Avnery lost his seat. The public split had hurt both the party and the newspaper. Avnery noted that the Moked party, which did win a seat, was in direct competition with Meri's voter base, with Avnery claiming that Moked "imitated" Meri slogans but omitted unpopular parts. Another secular and pacifist party also emerged in 1973, Shulamit Aloni's Ratz. Avnery claimed that anti-establishment voters had gotten used to his presence in the Knesset, with many voters turning their focus into getting Moked and Ratz in the Knesset, while others voted for Likud out of dissatisfaction with Golda Meir. After departing from the Knesset, he represented Meri in the Histadrut General Council for a brief period of time.

Prior to the 1977 elections, the party merged with Moked, the Independent Socialist Faction and some members of the Black Panthers to form the Left Camp of Israel (Sheli). The new party won two seats, which were rotated between five party members, including Avnery. However, they failed to win any seats in the 1981 elections and did not reappear in the Knesset. After Avnery met with Palestine Liberation Organization leader Yasser Arafat in 1983, Sheli broke up, with Avnery part of the Alternativa faction that co-founded the Progressive List for Peace. As a legal entity, Meri ceased to exist in 1979, with the merger of Sheli's internal factions.

== Ideology ==
The party platform advocated for the rollback of security forces within Israel, neutrality, secularism, freedom of speech, decriminalization of homosexuality and abortion and women's rights. It was among the first Jewish parties to recognise the Palestinians as a distinct people group. It advocated for equality between Ashkenazi and Mizrahi Jews and for the lifting of martial law on the Arab citizens of Israel. After the Six-Day War, it also began to support a two-state solution, and rejected the possibility of Jordanian re-annexation of the West Bank. Avnery claimed that Meri was the first political party conceived in an independent Israel, rather than originating in the Zionist ideologies created in Europe. It was the first major radical left-wing party in the country. Meri was responsible for the law that allowed free public transport for soldiers.

As a party dependent on the views of its leader, it did not describe itself as left or right, and did not focus on economics - Avnery was tolerant of free entreprise, and claimed that Meri attracted some centre-right voters.

Most of its voters were younger, educated Ashkenazi Jews.
