= Pepe Alalu =

- יוסף "פפה" אללו
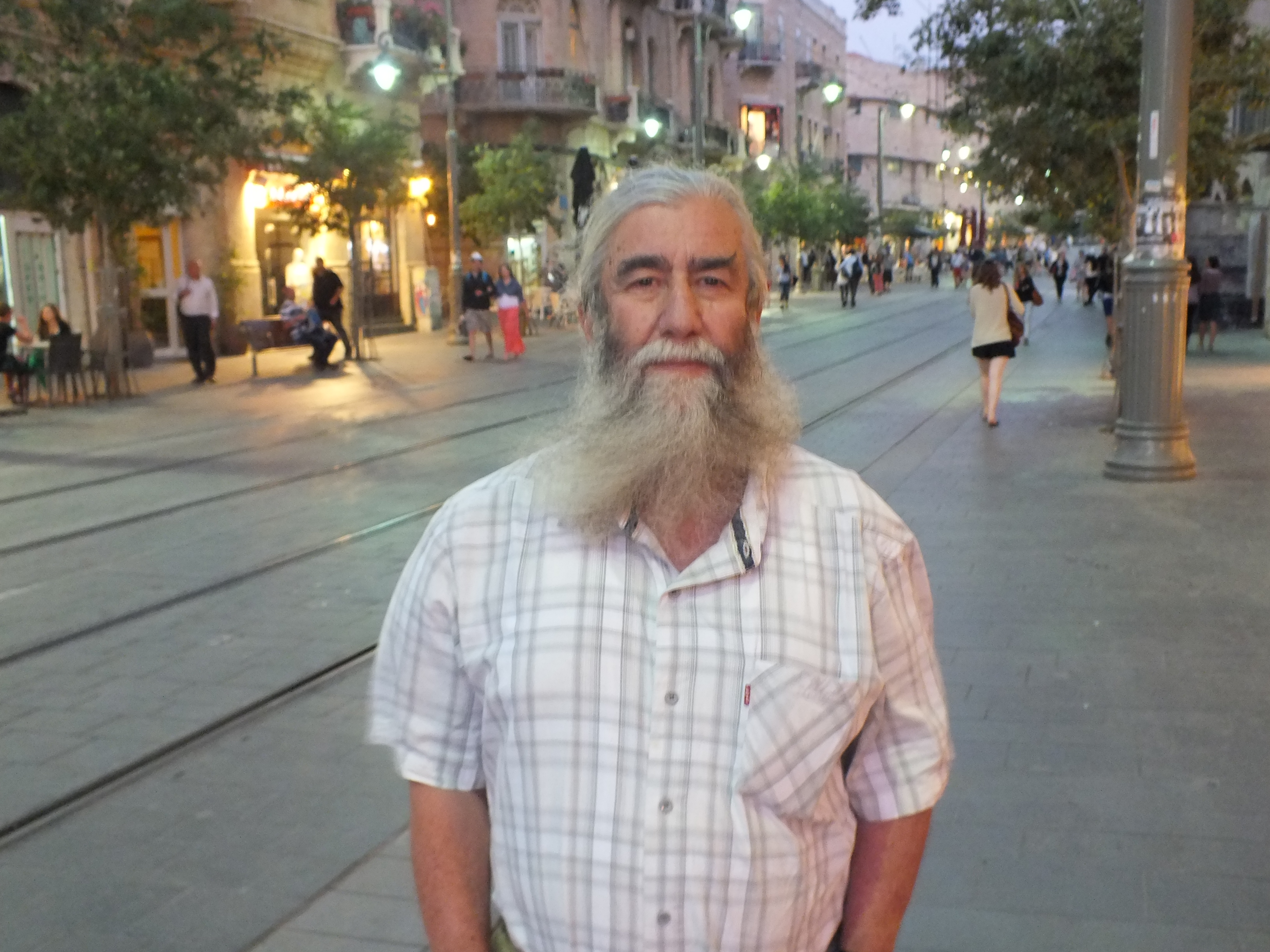
- Pepe Alalu (2013)

Personal details
- Born: יוסף פפה אללו
- Citizenship: Israel
- Party: Meretz
- Other political affiliations: Red Broom, Moked, Left Camp of Israel, Ratz
- Spouse: Rosa
- Children: 7
- Education: Hebrew University of Jerusalem
- Occupation: Knesset member (MK), Mayor member
- Profession: d

Yosef "Pepe" Alalu (Hebrew: יוסף פפה אללו; born March 10, 1945) is an Israeli social activist and former Knesset member (MK) between the years 2013 and 2015. He served as a member of the Jerusalem Municipality on behalf of Meretz for approximately 17 years, including five years as deputy mayor. He is considered one of the leaders of the struggle for a "free and equal" Jerusalem.

== Early life and education ==
Alalu was born in Lima, Peru, to a Sephardic Jewish family of Turkish origin. His father, Nissim Alalu, was president of the Jewish community in Peru and one of the founders of the first Jewish school in the country,

Alalu studied at the Colegio San Andrés, alongside Peruvian, Chinese, Japanese, and African American students. Alalu was active in the Zionist youth movement, first as a counselor and later as the movement's secretary. Alalu earned a master's degree in electrical engineering from the National University of Engineering (UNI). His thesis dealt with the development of electrical infrastructure for poor villages in northern Peru.

After Alalu immigrated to Israel, he studied education at the Faculty of Humanities of the Hebrew University of Jerusalem (HUJI).

== Military service ==
Alalu served as a combat soldier in the Israeli Artillery Corps, an Israel Defense Forces's corps responsible for operating medium and long-range artillery. He remained there until age 48.

== Political career ==
Pepe began his career as an activist and chairman of the Jewish student cell in Lima, Peru, and was also active in local left-wing political parties. He holds the opinion that Jerusalem is one of the central issues in the Israeli-Palestinian conflict, and argues that a just solution would involve dividing the city: Jewish-majority neighborhoods in western Jerusalem would remain under Israeli sovereignty, while Palestinian-majority neighborhoods in eastern Jerusalem would become part of Al-Quds, the future capital of Palestine.

He joined Israel politics in the early 1970s as a member of the World Union of Jewish Students (WUJS) secretariat. After studying at the Hebrew University of Jerusalem, Alalu joined a "New Left" movement and took part in the Black Panthers, an Israeli protest movement established by second-generation Jewish immigrants from North Africa and the Arab world. Alalu was arrested in a Black Panthers demonstration and was charged with unlawful assembly and rioting in a public space. His trial lasted for about a year and at the end he had to pay a fine, which was paid collectively by the Black Panthers movement.

He continued his political career in the parties Red Broom, Moked, Left Camp of Israel, Ratz and Meretz, all of which are Israeli left-wing parties. In the 80s. Alalu participated in the Peace Now movement and in the Histadrut, Israel's national trade union center. he left politics in 2015.

Alalu participated in the Israeli hostage deal protests in 2025.
