= El'ad railway station =

Railway station in Israel

El'ad–Petah Tikva South railway station (Hebrew: תחנת הרכבת אלעד – פתח תקווה דרום) is a railway station under construction near El'ad, Israel, forming part of the Eastern Railway. The station is planned to be built near the Nahshonim interchange, north of El'ad, and south of Petah Tikva, and is intended to serve El'ad, the nearby kibbutz of Nahshonim, and parts of southern Petah Tikva. The Eastern Railway is a national project aimed at renewal, expansion, and establishing a segment about 65 kilometers long, forming another connection between northern and central Israel near the route of Highway 6. A tender for the construction of El'ad station was published in June 2023.
