= Meir Pa'il =

Israeli politician (1926–2015)

- מאיר פעיל
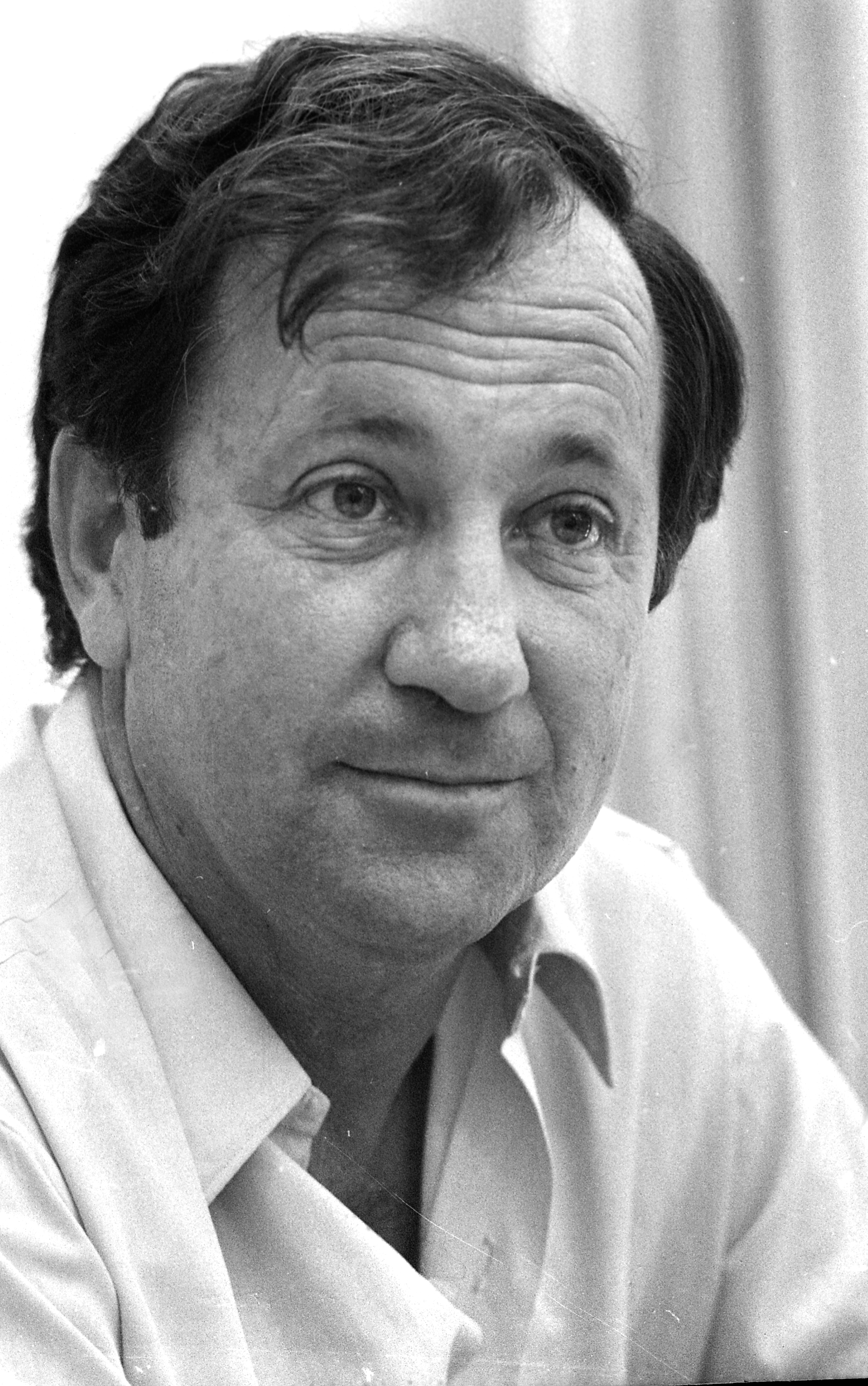
- Pa'il in 1973

Faction represented in the Knesset
- 1974–1977: Moked
- 1977–1980: Left Camp of Israel

Personal details
- Born: 19 June 1926 Jerusalem, Mandatory Palestine
- Died: 15 September 2015 (aged 89) Tel Aviv, Israel

Meir Pa'il (Hebrew: מאיר פעיל; 19 June 1926 – 15 September 2015) was an Israeli politician, military historian and a former colonel in the Israel Defense Forces.

== Biography ==
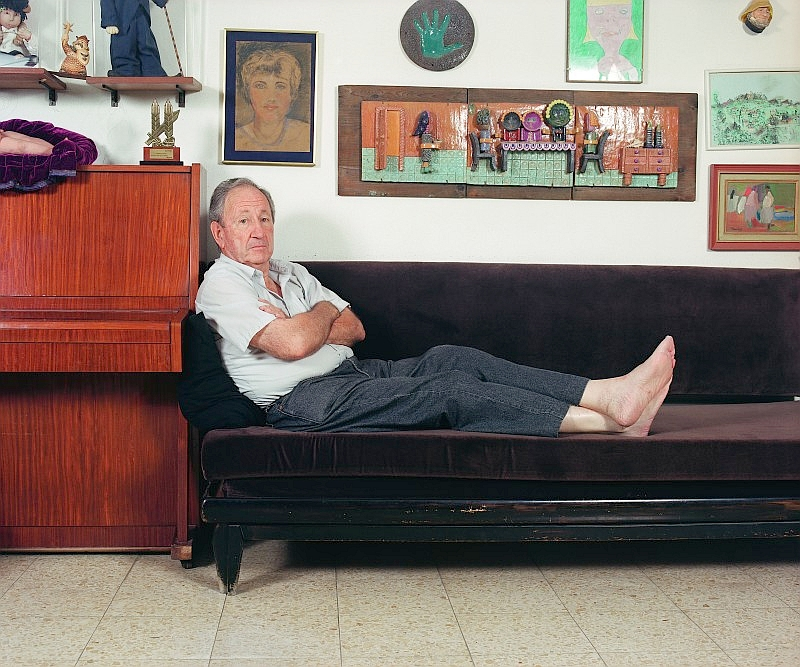
Pa'il c. 2003

Meir Pilevsky (later Pa'il) was born in Jerusalem during the Mandate era. His parents, Nahum and Bracha Pilevsky, were pioneers of the Third Aliyah. Pa'il studied at the Tahkemoni school in Jerusalem, a school for laborers' children in Holon, and at Balfour high school in Tel Aviv. He joined the "Working Youth" movement in 1937 and served in an active signal unit for the Haganah.

Pa'il served in the Palmach from 1943 to 1948. He participated in a series of operations, including the smuggling of illegal Jewish immigrants from Syria and Lebanon, the Saison, the Night of the Bridges, and an attack on a British police position on Mount Canaan. During the 1948 Arab-Israeli War, Pa'il served in the Negev Brigade. Pa'il served as a career officer in the IDF, commanding the 51st Battalion during the Suez Crisis, the Bahad-1 officers school from 1964 to 1966, and the Department of Military Theory for the General Staff. He left the IDF in 1971.

Pa'il studied history and Middle Eastern studies at Tel Aviv University, later gaining a doctorate in military and general history. In 1973, he was among the founders of the Blue-Red Movement, which merged with Maki to form Moked, which Pa'il headed.

He was elected to the Knesset in the 1973 elections on the Moked list, and was the party's only representative in the Knesset. The party merged with several others to form the Left Camp of Israel prior to the 1977 elections. The new party won two seats, which were rotated between five party members including Pa'il. However, they failed to win any seats in the 1981 elections and Pa'il did not reappear in the Knesset. He died on September 15, 2015, due to complications of Alzheimer's disease.

== Published works ==
- Political and Military Reflections in the Wake of the War of October 1973. Tel Aviv: Israel Peace Research Society, 1974. OCLC 3560340
- From the Hagana to the IDF (1979) (Hebrew)
- The West Bank and Gaza: A Strategic Analysis for Peace. Tel-Aviv: New Outlook, 1981. OCLC 7899345
- Development of Jewish Defense Capabilities, 1907–1948 (1987) (Hebrew)
- Independence 1948 (1990) (Hebrew)
- Rift in 1948 (1990)
- The Palmach (1995) (Hebrew)
- From Hashomer to the Israel Defence Forces: Armed Jewish Defense in Palestine. Jerusalem: Israel Information Center, 1997. OCLC 751545036
- The Commander: Temperate Military Leadership (2003) (Hebrew)
- Meirke - Meir Pa'il: Commander, Educator, Historian, Politician - Autobiography and Selected Texts. (2014) (Hebrew) OCLC 891845270
