= Left Camp of Israel =

Defunct socialist party in Israel

Left Camp of Israel מחנה שמאל לישראל
- Abbreviation: Sheli
- Leader: Uri Avnery; Aryeh Eliav
- Chairperson: Meir Pa'il
- Founder: Uri Avnery; Aryeh Eliav; Meir Pa'il; Mattityahu Peled
- Founded: 1977
- Dissolved: 1984
- Merger of: Meri; Moked; Independent Socialist Faction; Black Panthers (faction)
- Merged into: Ratz
- Succeeded by: Progressive List for Peace (faction)
- Ideology: Socialism (Israeli); Pacifism; Post-Zionism
- Political position: Left-wing
- Most MKs: 2 (1977–1980)
- Fewest MKs: 1 (1980–1981)

Election symbol
- ש

The Left Camp of Israel (Hebrew: מחנה שמאל לישראל, Maḥaneh Smol LeYisrael) was a left-wing political party in Israel. It was also known as Sheli (Hebrew: של״י), an abbreviation for "Peace for Israel" (Hebrew: שלום לישראל, Shalom LeYisrael).

== History ==
=== Background ===
In the 1973 Israel legislative election, the Meri party, led by popular anti-establishment journalist Uri Avnery of HaOlam Hazeh fame, lost its representation in the Knesset. Avnery then decided to meticulously plan his return to the Knesset by writing a new manifesto, the "Plan for the State of Israel".

In 1975, the Israeli Council for Israeli-Palestinian Peace (ICIPP) was founded, which included former Major General of the Israel Defence Forces Mattityahu Peled, left-wing economist and activist Ya'akov Arnon, former Mapam member Yossi Amitai, journalist Amos Kenan, former secretary general of the Israeli Labor Party, Aryeh Eliav, and Uri Avnery. While Avnery had been a longstanding critic of the Israeli establishment since the early 1950s, most of the ICIPP's founders—including Peled—were former members of the Israeli political and security establishment who had shifted toward more left-leaning positions in the early 1970s.

In 1976, Peled and several other Israelis engaged in dialogue with senior PLO official Issam Sartawi, who participated with the full authorization of PLO Chairman Yasser Arafat. The initiation of this dialogue marked a notable shift in PLO policy, as the organization had previously maintained a position of engaging only with anti-Zionist Israelis.

The Israeli participants in these early contacts with the PLO received numerous death threats, and some newspaper columnists publicly accused them of treason. At the time, the PLO was widely regarded in Israel as a terrorist organization responsible for acts of violence, and the notion of engaging in dialogue with its representatives was viewed by much of the Israeli public as incomprehensible.

During his first term as Prime Minister of Israel (1974–1977), Yitzhak Rabin was approached by Peled, who offered to brief him on the unofficial contacts taking place between Israeli representatives and the PLO. Rabin agreed to receive these briefings, and on several occasions, Peled served as a channel through which PLO representatives—such as Sartawi—conveyed messages intended for the Prime Minister. While Rabin listened to the briefings, he declined to send any messages in return, stating, "That would be negotiating with the PLO, and I will never, never do that."

=== 1977-1981: Knesset term ===
Eliav founded the Left Camp of Israel (or Sheli), a merger of dovish socialist (but non-communist) parties in order to contest the 1977 elections. Much of Sheli was composed of the ICIPP, including the Meri party and Eliav's own Independent Socialist Faction. Eliav had served as an Alignment MK until 1975, when he left and founded Ya'ad – Civil Rights Movement with the Ratz party, another splinter from the Alignment. He left Ya'ad the following year to create the Independent Socialist Faction.

Other parties that merged into the Left Camp included Moked (merger of the old Communist Party and the student movement Siah), including its sole MK Meir Pa'il, reserve army official Ran Cohen and former Mapam and Left Faction member Yair Tzaban, and some members of the Black Panthers, including Saadia Marciano. Other prominent Sheli members included former Mapam MK Ya'akov Riftin, journalist Yael Lotan, singer Yafa Yarkoni, and Tayibe school headmaster (and another former Mapam member) Walid Haj Yahia. Two other important Sheli members were Gadi Yatziv, who would later briefly serve Mapam in the Knesset in 1988, and Ruth Dayan, a renowned peace activist and ex-wife of famous Labor politician Moshe Dayan. Ofer Cassif, a later Hadash MK, joined Sheli in 1979 as a teenager.

At the same time, Moked's rival Rakah, which represented anti-Zionist communist viewpoints, merged with Charlie Biton's faction of the Black Panthers, as well as Aki, an organisation composed of Moked defectors, to create Hadash, another left-wing political coalition, which was composed mostly of Arabs, as opposed to Sheli's predominantly Jewish membership.

Although the admission of Ratz into Sheli was feasible, as the two shared similar views on the peace process, the presence of Moked, the heir of the old communist party, was enough to prevent Ratz leader Shulamit Aloni (who was present in Ya'ad) from discussing a merger with Sheli.

Sheli won two seats in the elections, which were held on a rotation basis by five party members; Avnery, Eliav, Haj Yahia, Marciano, and Pa'il. Under the agreement, Eliav and Pa'il would hold the seats for from 1977 to 1979, when Avnery replaced Eliav. The 1977 elections saw the Labor Party's Alignment lose for the first time in history. Sheli was even able to overtake Ratz, who dropped to just one seat. Positioned after the first five in the party list were Ran Cohen and Ruth Dayan.

In February 1980, the Black Panthers left Sheli in protest that Saadia Marciano had not been given the rotating seat that Pa'il held for one more year than he should have. The decision went to the Sheli committee, who denied Marciano the seat, leading to a physical altercation by Black Panther members. After a long and protracted struggle, although Marciano took Pa'il's seat in May, in November he broke away from the party to form a single-member faction, later established as Equality in Israel – Panthers. Officially, Marciano stated that his reason for leaving Sheli was due to personal conflict with Avnery, who he accused of 'playing politics' and 'ignoring burning social problems'. On 19 May 1981, Marciano was joined in his new party by former Dash MK, Mordechai Elgrably. The new party was later renamed as the Unity Party. Yair Tzaban, who represented Sheli in the Executive Committee of the Histadrut, had already returned to Mapam in 1980, sensing the tension within Sheli. In February 1981, Avnery resigned from the Knesset and gave his seat to Haj Yahia as scheduled.

For the 1981 election, Pa'il led the party list, followed by Haj Yahia, Cohen, Peled and Lotan. During the election, its slogans were 'Let the true peace-fighters into the Knesset', and 'Rather than wasting your vote on Peres or The Change List, give it to Sheli'. Despite some high hopes placed for Sheli from across the political spectrum, and commentators predicting that it would win over former Mapam voters, the party failed to cross the election threshold with Haj Yahia losing his seat. The Unity Party suffered the same fate.

=== Split and dissolution ===
Within Sheli, the ICIPP group—led by Peled and Avnery—effectively became a faction in ongoing conflict with Ran Cohen's group. Tensions peaked during the 1982 Lebanon War. Peled publicly supported the stance of reserve soldiers who refused to serve in the war, as organized by the Yesh Gvul movement. Around 200 of these refusers were imprisoned, and Peled’s endorsement attracted significant public attention due to his background as a senior military officer. Cohen, himself a reserve colonel, objected strongly to this position, asserting that soldiers were obligated to carry out orders even if they personally disagreed with the war. Cohen participated in the conflict as an artillery officer during the bombardment of Beirut.

Meanwhile, Avnery crossed the front lines and met Yasser Arafat on 3 July 1982, during the Siege of Beirut—said to have been the first time an Israeli met personally with Arafat. He was tracked by an Israeli intelligence team which intended to kill Arafat, even if it meant killing Avnery at the same time once the latter had inadvertently led them to Arafat's hide-out. The operation, "Salt Fish", failed when the PLO managed to lose their trackers in the alleyways of Beirut. Cohen condemned the meeting, describing it as "fawning." In response, Peled accused Cohen of being "a war criminal who bombards a civilian population".

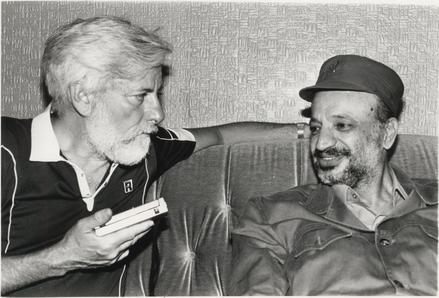
Sheli's co-founder Uri Avnery with PLO leader Yasser Arafat in 1982.

In 1983, Peled led his faction, including Avnery and Arnon, out of Sheli to form the 'Alternativa' movement. Shortly after, Cohen led the rump Sheli, including Binyamin Temkin, into Ratz, in a one-to-three ratio agreement, dissolving Sheli in the process.

=== Aftermath ===
In 1981, Tzaban was elected as an MK for the Alignment, before pulling Mapam out of it in 1984 and becoming its final leader in 1988. Gadi Yatziv had already returned to Mapam in 1979, and briefly served in the Knesset in 1988. Haj Yahia followed them back to Mapam following Sheli's dissolution, but did not contest the 1988 election. Under Tzaban, Mapam's 1988 election campaign focused heavily on the peace process, a route that Ratz had also taken that year.

The 'Alternativa' merged into the Progressive List for Peace, a joint Jewish-Arab party that won two seats in the 1984 elections, with Peled taking one. Avnery served as the party chairman. In the same election, Cohen became an MK for Ratz. Eliav also ran in the election, but as an independent, and failed to win a seat. He then returned to the Labor Party, and in 1988, he returned to the Knesset, the same year Peled and Yatziv lost their seats.

The Progressive List for Peace disintegrated in 1992 over the question of support for Iraq in the Gulf War. Ratz and Mapam merged into Meretz in the same year, with Haj Yahia, Temkin, Cohen and Tzaban all being elected into the Knesset and the latter two as government ministers from 1992 to 1996. Cohen served as a Meretz MK until 2009.

Prime Minister Yitzhak Rabin and Yasser Arafat signed the first of the Oslo Accords in 1993 in order to commence a peace process, while Meretz was in Rabin's government.

Uri Avnery founded the activist group Gush Shalom in 1993, and in the 2000s supported Hadash. Ofer Cassif joined Hadash after being imprisoned for objecting to serve in the army during the First Intifada. He became a Hadash MK in 2019, a position which he serves until the present.

== Ideology ==
Sheli called for negotiations with the Palestine Liberation Organization based on mutual recognition and for the establishment of an Arab Palestinian state along the Green Line, with a full withdrawal of Israeli military and settlers from the West Bank and Gaza Strip. Furthermore, it campaigned for an end to discrimination against the Arab community, wage increases and secularism.

One faction, led by Ran Cohen, argued that Israelis engaging in dialogue with Palestinian representatives should seek reciprocal concessions, such as official recognition of the State of Israel. In contrast, Mattityahu Peled, who served on the party’s executive throughout its six-year existence but never held elected office, maintained that Palestinian leaders could not be expected to offer such concessions in informal talks with Israeli dissidents. He argued that doing so would undermine their negotiating position in any future official talks with the Israeli government—a prospect that seemed remote at the time, particularly after the 1977 elections brought Menachem Begin to power as Prime Minister and Ariel Sharon to the post of Minister of Defense.

In economic issues, Sheli constituted a big tent of socialists. Major figures, such as Cohen, were kibbutz residents and Labor Zionists. Yair Tzaban's faction of Zionist democratic socialists presented the moderate end of the party, who were open to co-operating with the Labour Alignment. Cohen and Pa'il led the wing of the party that was focused on economic issues rather than peace talks. Uri Avnery, while in Sheli, still proclaimed he was beyond the left–right political spectrum and he was accepting of free enterprise, a mindset which the socialist Saadia Marciano, whose Black Panther party was focused on the struggles of the economically dispossessed Mizrahi community, cited as a reason for leaving the party.

Nevertheless, Sheli was more distant from strict socialist or communist parlance as compared to the former parties of its members such as Mapam or Moked, choosing to centre its campaigns around the peace process.
