= Shalom Cohen (politician) =

Israeli politician

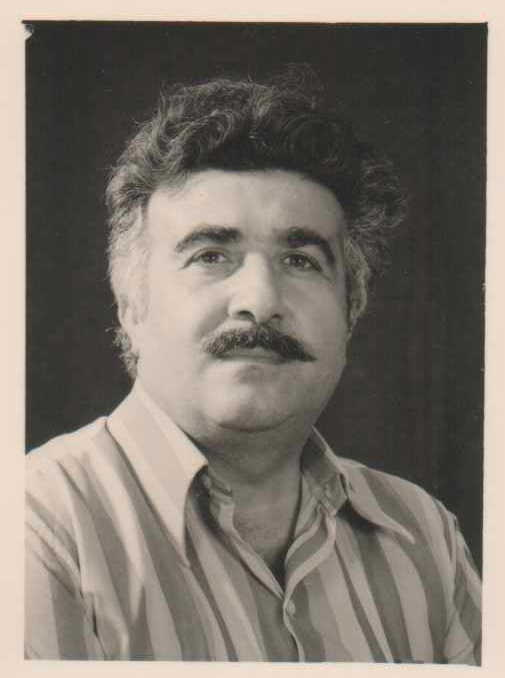
- Cohen during his time in the Knesset

Faction represented in the Knesset
- 1969–1972: HaOlam HaZeh – Koah Hadash
- 1972–1974: Independent

Personal details
- Born: 1926 Baghdad, Iraq
- Died: 1993 (aged 66–67)

Shalom Cohen (Hebrew: שָׁלוֹם כֹּהֵן; 1926–1993) was an Israeli politician who served as a member of the Knesset between 1969 and 1974.

== Biography ==
Born in Baghdad in Iraq, Cohen's family moved to Egypt when he was six years old. He attended an English college in Alexandria, where he was one of the founders of the local Hashomer Hatzair branch. He emigrated to Mandatory Palestine in 1946, and joined kibbutz Nahshonim. During the 1948 Arab-Israeli War he was part of the Samson's Foxes commando unit in the Givati Brigade. It was there that he met Uri Avnery.

In 1950 Cohen and Avnery bought the HaOlam HaZeh weekly magazine, which he remained an editor of until 1971. He was amongst the founders of the HaOlam HaZeh – Koah Hadash political movement, and became its secretary general in 1966. In 1969 he was elected to the Knesset on the party's list. However, he left the movement in 1971, and from 4 January 1972, sat as an independent for the remainder of the Knesset term.

He joined the Black Panthers in 1971 and served as their secretary general until 1977. Between 1971 and 1977 he was also a member of the Histadrut's executive committee. In the 1977 elections he ran as part of the Hofesh party together with Yehoshua Peretz. However, it failed to cross the electoral threshold. He later worked as a journalist for the French language paper Le Matin. He died in 1993.
