= Yair Tzaban =

Israeli politician and activist

- יאיר צבן
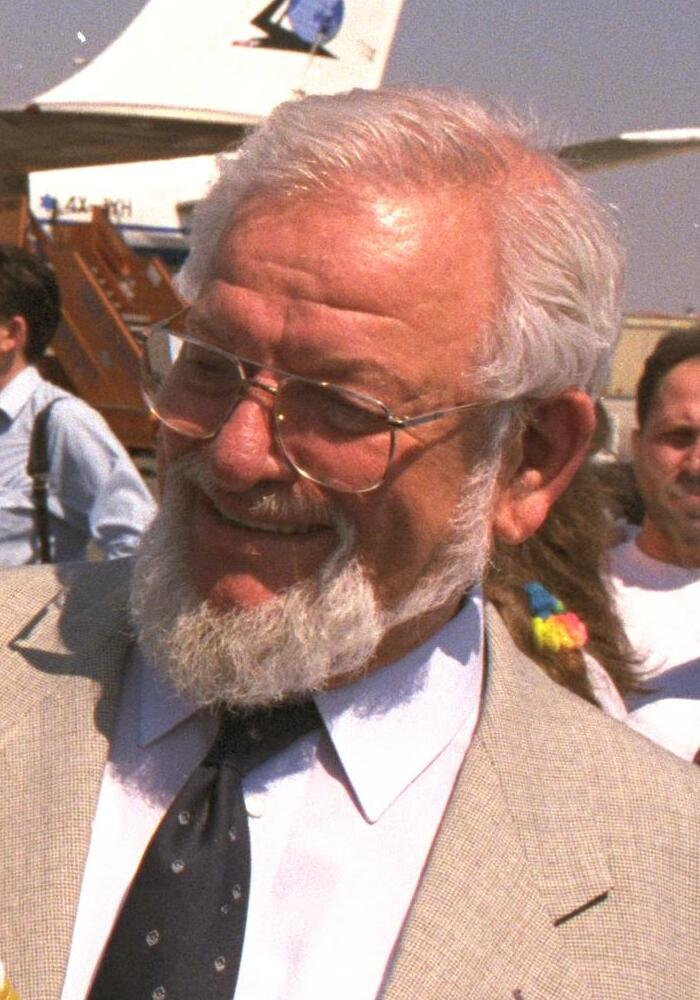
- Tzaban in 1995, on duty as Minister of Immigrant Absorption

Leader of the Opposition
- De facto 16 March 1988 – 22 December 1988
- Prime Minister: Yitzhak Shamir
- Preceded by: Victor Shem-Tov
- Succeeded by: Shulamit Aloni

Ministerial roles
- 1992–1996: Minister of Immigrant Absorption

Faction represented in the Knesset
- 1981–1984: Alignment
- 1984–1988: Mapam
- 1992–1996: Meretz

Personal details
- Born: 23 August 1930 (age 96) Jerusalem, Mandatory Palestine
- Party: Meretz
- Other political affiliations: Mapam (1948-1953); Left Faction (1953-1954); Maki (1954-1973); Moked (1973-1977); Sheli (1977-1980); Mapam (1980-1997); Alignment (1980-1984)

Military service
- Allegiance: Haganah
- Branch/service: Palmach
- Years of service: 1948

Yair Tzaban (Hebrew: יאיר צבן; born 23 August 1930) is an Israeli politician, academic and social activist.

== Biography ==
Tzaban was born in Jerusalem in 1930. During the 1948 Palestine War he fought in the Palmach. He was among the founders of Kibbutz Tzora, near Jerusalem.

In the 1950s, after moving to Tel Aviv, he studied in Seminar HaKibutzim (a teacher's college) and worked as a teacher and youth educator in the poor suburbs of Tel Aviv. Tzaban holds a BA degree in Jewish and General Philosophy from Tel Aviv University.

For 45 years Tzaban has been politically active. He joined the Mapam political party, like many of his Palmach comrades. However, after Mapam was hit by internal struggles over relations with the Soviet Union, he followed Moshe Sneh into the Left Faction in 1953, before the Faction dissolved into Maki the following year. He was a member of its politburo from 1965 to 1973 and its chairman in 1972–1973. Maki then merged into Moked, and in 1977, into the Left Camp of Israel, a peace list which ran for the Knesset and Histadrut elections. Tzaban ran for the latter. The Left Camp did not last long however, and in 1980, Tzaban returned to Mapam, while it was in the Alignment.

In 1981 he was elected to the Knesset for Mapam. It left the Alignment in 1984, and Tzaban became its leader in 1988. In 1992, Mapam merged into the Meretz alliance, and Tzaban was a key figure in its campaigns. In 1992 he was invited by the late Prime Minister Yitzhak Rabin to serve as the Minister of Immigrant Absorption and as a member of the Security Cabinet (until 1996). As Minister of Immigrant Absorption he strove to establish full co-operation with the leadership of the Jewish Agency. During the years 1996-2002 he served as the head of the Academic Board of the Lavon Institute for Research of the Labor Movement and lectured at Tel Aviv University to graduate students in the Department for Public Policy.

Since 1996 he has served as Chairman of the Board of Directors of Meitar - The College of Judaism as Culture in Jerusalem. In 2000 he initiated the publishing of The Encyclopedia of Jewish Culture in the Era of Modernization and Secularization, with Yirmiyahu Yovel as Editor in Chief and himself as Director General of the project. The Encyclopedia was published, in Hebrew, in 2007.

Throughout his career he has been deeply involved in the fight against religious coercion, for a pluralistic approach and for granting equal status to the Reform and Conservative movements in Israel. As a result of this work, he was invited to be the guest of the Congress of the Reform Movement (Atlanta, 1995) and of the Conference of the Rabbis of the Conservative movement in the United States (1996). He also received (1997) Honorary Doctorate from the Hebrew Union College. He is a member of the International Federation for Secular and Humanistic Judaism.

He is married to Shulamit, father to Smadar and Dror, and grandfather to Dana, Shai, Rothem and Noam. He is the brother-in-law of Captain Avraham Ariel, who holds the record of being the youngest ship captain in Israeli History.
