= Binyamin Temkin =

Mexican-Israeli politician (born 1945)

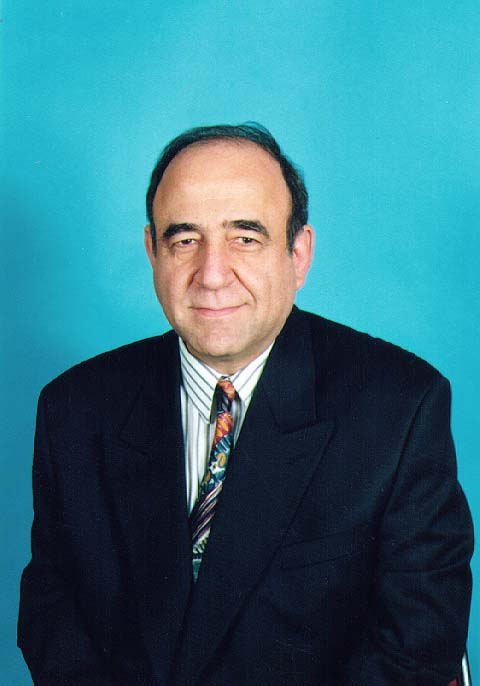
- Temkin in the 1990s

Faction represented in the Knesset
- 1992–1996: Meretz

Personal details
- Born: 7 March 1945 (age 81) Monterrey, Mexico

Binyamin "Benny" Temkin (Hebrew: בנימין טמקין; born 7 March 1945) is an Israeli former politician who served as a member of the Knesset for Meretz between 1992 and 1996.

== Biography ==
Born in Monterrey, Mexico in 1945, he studied his BA in Economics at the University of Nuevo León, and participated in the leftist student movements of the 1960s. Temkin emigrated to Israel in 1971. He was awarded an MA by the Hebrew University of Jerusalem and a PhD by Columbia University, and published several papers on political science.

He began his political activism with left-wing groups at the Hebrew University, and was involved with Moked and the Left Camp of Israel, before joining Ratz. He chaired its council between 1985 and 1989. From 1989 until 1992 he was the Ratz party's Secretary General, and in 1992 was elected to the Knesset on the Meretz list (then an alliance of Ratz, Mapam and Shinui). He chaired the Subcommittee on Distressed Youth and the Parliamentary Inquiry Committee on Violence Among Youth, before losing his seat in the 1996 elections. From 1996 to 1999 he was Secretary General of the Meretz party.

After failing to be re-elected in 1999, he returned to Mexico to work as an academic. He was due to replace Amnon Rubinstein after he resigned from the Knesset in 2002, but turned it down, with Uzi Even taking the place instead. At present, Temkin is a professor and researcher at the Facultad Latinoamericana de Ciencias Sociales (FLACSO) in Mexico. He was the Editor of the journal Perfiles Latinoamericanos and is the Director of a Masters Program in Environmental and Energy Policy and Management at FLACSO-Mexico
