= Nahum Barnea =

Israeli journalist (born 1944)

Nahum Barnea נחום ברנע
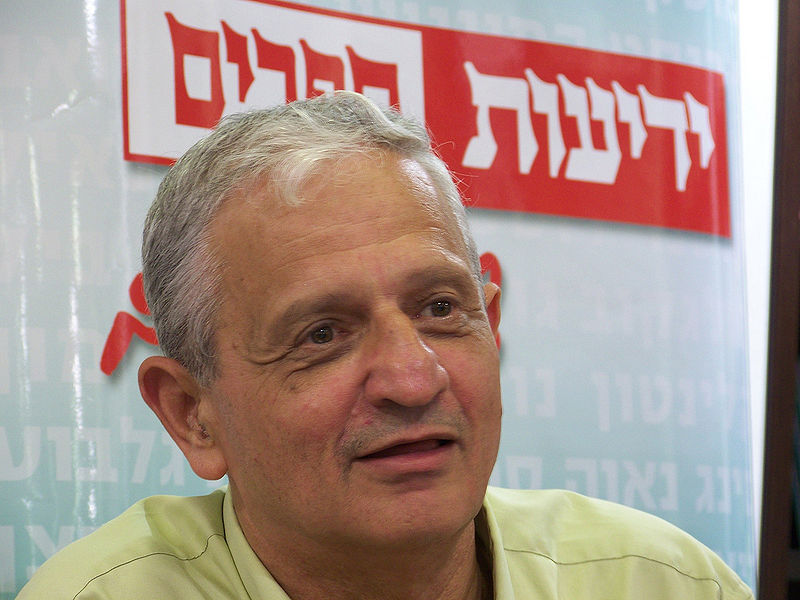
- Born: 23 October 1944 (age 81); Petah Tikva, Mandate for Palestine
- Education: Hebrew University of Jerusalem; London School of Economics
- Occupation: Journalism

Nahum Barnea (Hebrew: נחום ברנע; born 23 October 1944) is an Israeli journalist. Barnea writes for Yedioth Ahronoth. He won the Israel Prize in 2007.

== Biography ==
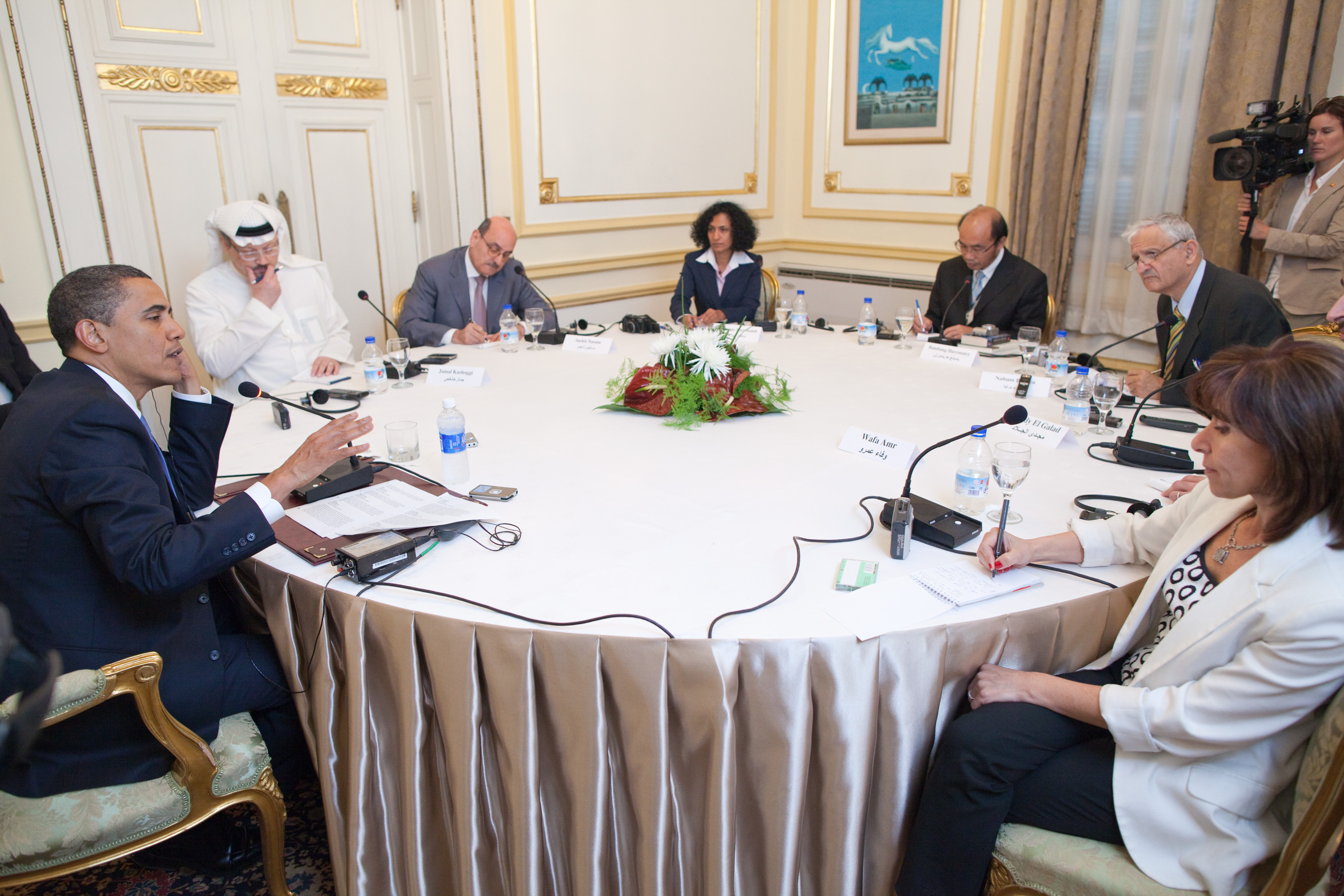
4 June 2009 − after his speech A New Beginning at Cairo University, U.S. President Obama, participates in a roundtable interview with among others Jamal Khashoggi, Shahnaz Habib, Bambang Harymurti and Nahum Barnea

Nahum Borstein (later Barnea) was born in Petah Tikva. He served in the IDF in Nahal Mutznah. He earned a B.A. in history and political science from Hebrew University in Jerusalem.

Barnea is married to Tami, writer Rina Ben-Menahem's sister and they have three children. His son Yonatan was killed in February 1996 by Hamas in a terrorist attack on Bus 18 in Jerusalem.

== Journalism career ==
Barnea began his journalism career at university, writing for the student newspaper Pi-Ha'aton. From 1967 to 1982, he worked for the newspaper Davar, becoming the paper's correspondent in Washington, D.C. Later he founded and edited a weekly paper Koteret Rashit. Since 1989, Barnea has been a staff writer for Yedioth Ahronoth. He wrote for Ha'Ayin HaShevi'it from 1996 to 2008.

== Awards and recognitions ==
Barnea was awarded the Sokolov Prize for journalism in 1981. In a survey in 1998, he was voted one of the most influential journalists in Israel. In 1996, he received the prize "Archivio Disarmo - Golden Doves for Peace" from IRIAD. In 2007, he won the Israel Prize in the sphere of communications. The judges who awarded the prize said: "Nahum Barnea is a journalist who almost every young writer aspires to emulate." They added, "Barnea always insists on 'being there,' close to events, even in places of social tension, even in wars and on days of terror attacks, even when his presence places his life in danger." On 29 March 2007, he accepted an award from the president of Tel Aviv University for "his achievements and his unique contribution to the profession of journalism in Israel.

== Controversy ==
=== Lynch test ===
Barnea invented the "lynch test" for Israeli journalists who refuse to criticize Arab terrorism. According to Kenneth Levin, this is a "rare instance of Israeli media self-scrutiny". This term was first used after the 2000 Ramallah lynching, in which an Arab mob beat to death two Israeli reservists who had mistakenly entered Ramallah. Barnea identified Haaretz journalists Gideon Levy, Amira Hass, and Akiva Eldar as not passing the lynch test.

=== Accusation of bias ===
In 2007, Barnea was criticized for defending former Prime Minister Ehud Olmert while he was being investigated on corruption charges. Independent journalist Yoav Yitzhak claimed that Barnea published statements he knew were untrue. Yaron Zalika, the Comptroller General from 2003 to 2007, said that Barnea insulted him in his column without giving him an opportunity to respond.

In January 2011, MK Shelly Yachimovich claimed that Barnea insinuated that women might be responsible for turning themselves into sex objects by wearing provocative clothing, inviting rape. When Barnea drew attention to a photograph of Yachimovich jogging on the beach in shorts, Yachimovich denied that her outfit was provocative and said that anything less than a hijab stimulated Barnea's fantasies. Yachimovich also criticized Barnea for his "gentle" interview with former President Moshe Katzav, after his conviction for rape, and suggesting that the victims were to blame. Barnea subsequently apologized for his remarks.

== Published works ==
Barnea has published two collections of his articles, יורים ובוכים ("They shoot and cry") and ימי נתניהו ("Days of Netanyahu"). In 2006, he published Backchannel: Bush, Sharon and the Uses of Unilateralism.

- Yorim u-bokhim, a collection of articles he wrote for Davar, published in 1981.
- Yemay netanyahu,'a collection of articles he wrote for Yedioth Ahronoth and Ha'Ayin HaShevi'it, published in 1999.

== See also ==
- List of Israel Prize recipients
- Journalism in Israel
