= Rina Ben-Menahem =

Israeli writer

- שרה רינה בן-מנחם
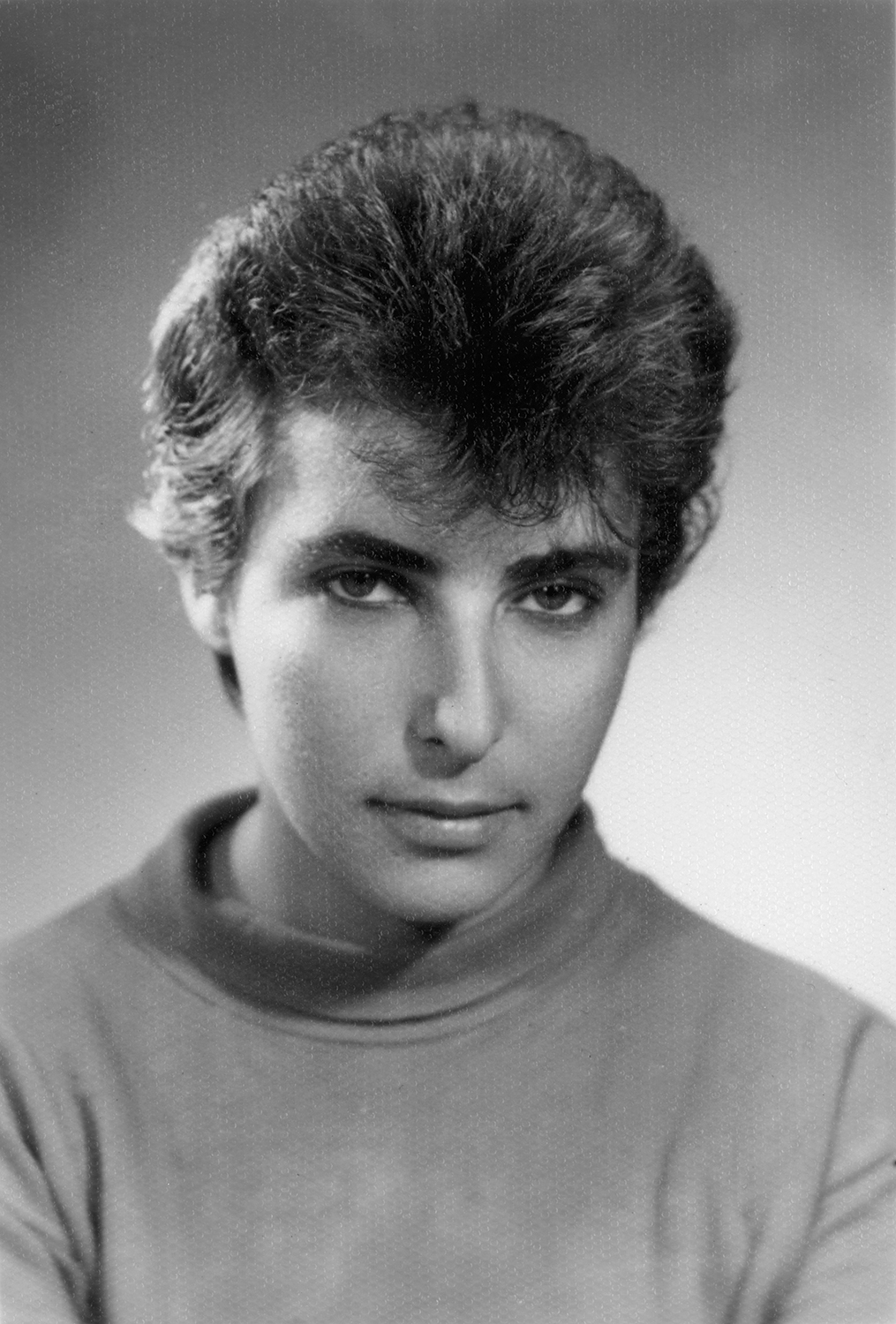
- Ben-Menahem on the cover of her first book (1960)
- Born: 26 June 1935; Bnei Brak, Mandatory Palestine
- Died: 12 June 2004 (aged 68); Amsterdam, Netherlands
- Writing career
- Pen name: ש.ר.ב.
- Language: Hebrew
- Years active: 1960–1963
- Genre: Lesbian literature

Ben-Menahem on the cover of her first book

Sara Rina Ben-Menahem (Hebrew: רינה בן מנחם; 26 June 1935 – 12 June 2004) was an Israeli writer, author of the first Hebrew language book to describe the homosexual and lesbian scene in Israel, "הדווקאים", published in 1960, and the first Hebrew lesbian novel, "הצלע", published in 1961.

== Biography ==
Ben-Menahem was born and raised in Bnei Brak, the eldest of three children. Her mother was born in Tel Aviv and her father in Slonim, Belarus. Her sister, Tami, is married to the Israeli journalist, Nahum Barnea. Ben-Menahem left school at the age of 15, to study jewelry making at the Bezalel Academy of Arts and Design in Jerusalem. She volunteered to Zahal at the age of 17, and served in the Air Force as a sports instructor.

After her discharge from the army, Ben-Menahem returned to Jerusalem, and made a living from jewel making and writing pulp fiction stories. At the age of 20, she added the second name Rina to her birth name Sara, typically of her doing things her own way. It was during this period that she self-published her three books. Ben-Menahem moved to Ein Hod in the middle of the 1960s, where she lived with a woman in domestic partnership, continued to make jewelry and also painted and exhibited her paintings at a local gallery.

Shortly afterwards, at the beginning of the 1970s, after separating from her partner, she left Israel for Amsterdam, and shunned from publicity. She died in Amsterdam in 2004. In October 2018, all three books were re-published in a single volume by Am Oved, by the initiative of her brother in law, Barnea.

== Books ==
=== הדווקאים ===
Self-published in Tel Aviv in 1960, under the Pseudonym .ש.ר.ב (S.R.B. – created from the initials of her name), this book was uniquely first in its description of the homosexual and lesbian scene in Israel from first person acquaintance, rather than reporting about it as a problem. The book's name means "The Spiteful Doers", and is derived from the multi-faceted Yiddish and Hebrew word "davka" (Hebrew: דווקא).

The book consists of anecdotal stories in which the protagonist, a young woman named Yael, tells about her recognition of her lesbian sexuality and her coming out of the closet.

The book was a huge success, but not for its literary qualities: shortly after its publication, the magazine HaOlam HaZeh published an article titled "The Wave of Lesbians in Israel" (Hebrew: גל הלסביות בישראל), as part of that issue's sensational back cover story, titled "Special Report: The Lesbian Problem in Israel (Hebrew: "דו״ח מיוחד: הבעיה הלסבית בישראל"), in which it included a few nit-picked erotic paragraphs from the book. The result, in the young and puritan State of Israel, was a storming of the book stores, with the first edition selling out within days.

In an interview to the same magazine, two weeks after the first article, Ben-Mehahem told about her failed attempts to find a publisher for the book, and her saving penny to penny until she could afford to publish it herself. As the magazine hints, many details in the book are based on the author's personal experience.

The book's cover was designed by Ben-Menahem herself, and includes a self portrait.

=== הצלע או יומנה של הצלע ה-13 ===
Riding on the wave of the success of her first book, Ben-Menahem published her second book, "The Rib or The Diary of the 13th Rib" (1961, Bnei Brak). This book's protagonist, Hava, is a fictional Sephardi Jew, from the margins of society, who suffers triple discrimination – as a Sephardi, as a woman and as a lesbian. She only discovers her lesbian tendency after her marriage.

The book is written as a chronological diary, spanning 20 years of Hava's life, beginning in her adolescence in 1938, up to 1958, when she is a mother, dying of cancer. The biographical details are interspersed with descriptions and thoughts about real historical events of that period.

=== הפרחחית ===
Ben-Menahems third book, "The Whippersnapper" (January 1963, Tel Aviv), describes, like the second book, the life of a fictional Sephardi woman, this time from even more extreme margins of society, and her triple discrimination. This book, too, comes out blatantly against the discrimination of Sephardim by the Ashkenazi establishment hegemony.
