= Siah (group) =

Israeli left-wing group (1968–1973)

Siah (Hebrew: שי״ח, an acronym for Smol Israeli Hadash, Hebrew: שמאל ישראלי חדש, "Israeli New Left") was an Israeli political and student movement active from 1968 to 1973. According to historian Reuven Kaminer, it was "the major force of the student left in the 1968–1973 period". Siah drew some of its organizational approaches and rhetoric from the global New Left.

Siah was formed through the merger of two independently established groups in Tel Aviv-Yafo and Jerusalem. The Tel Aviv contingent originated among Mapam supporters at Tel Aviv University who separated from the party in protest against its alignment with Mapai, and soon included former members of Maki. The Jerusalem group consisted largely of Hebrew University of Jerusalem students with less political experience, including recent immigrants who had settled in Israel to fight in the Six-Day War. Ideologically, the Tel Aviv group generally identified as Zionist, while many members of the Jerusalem group regarded themselves as non-Zionist or anti-Zionist.

Prominent activists associated with Siah included Ran Cohen, Dani Peter, Yossi Amitai, Benyamin Cohen, and Zvika Deutch.

An action by Siah members in 1972 is documented in the book My Home, My Prison by Raymonda Hawa Tawil. Following the refusal of Palestinian villagers from Aqraba, Nablus to sell to Jewish settlers in 1972, the Israeli military declared fields used by the people of Akrabeh to be in a training, firing zone, dangerous and off limits. When no training appeared, villagers began to till and plant the land until April 28, 1972 when an Israeli plane dropped an unknown chemical on the fields killing the plants and poisoning the land. Eighty members of Siah demonstrated in support of Palestinian self-determination and the villagers of Aqraba. Several participants in the protest were arrested and faced legal action, including court-martial proceedings.

Siah disbanded in 1973 due to internal disagreement over participation in electoral politics. The Tel Aviv faction, favoring electoral engagement, formed the Blue-Red Movement (blue for Zionism, red for socialism) and subsequently joined the political party Moked. Moked then merged into the Left Camp of Israel, where Ran Cohen and Amitai were prominent figures. The Left Camp dissolved in 1983 over relations between its co-founder Uri Avnery and the Palestine Liberation Organisation, with Ran Cohen joining Ratz, for whom he became a member of the Knesset, continuing after it merged into Meretz.
