= HaOlam HaZeh =

Israeli news magazine

- Type: Weekly magazine
- Founder: Uri Cesari
- Editor: Uri Avnery
- Founded: 1937
- Ceased publication: 1993
- Political alignment: Anti-establishment
- Language: Hebrew

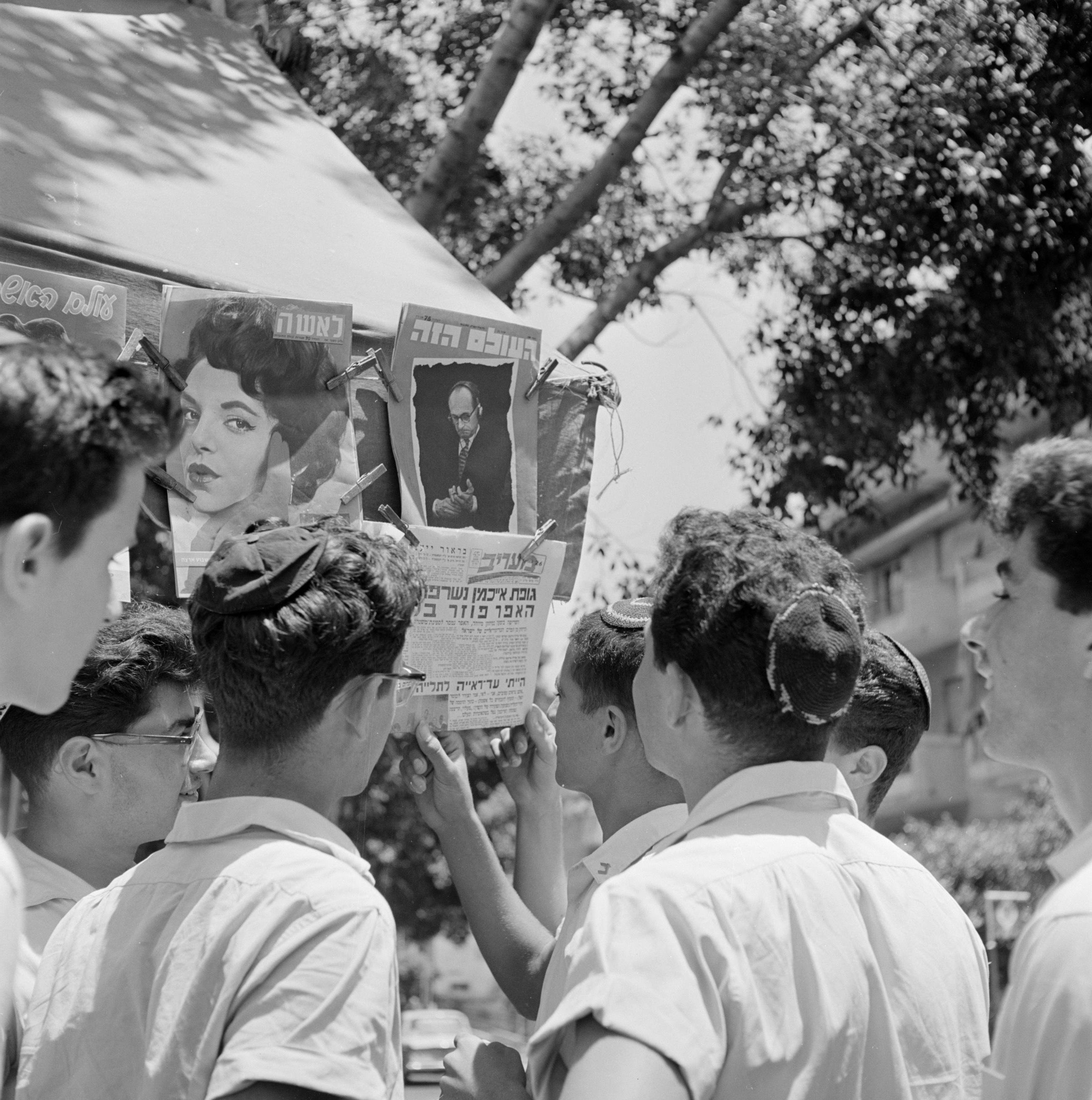
Israeli youngsters are reading about Adolf Eichmann's trial, on HaOlam HaZeh, 1964, Tel-Aviv.

HaOlam HaZeh (Hebrew: העולם הזה, lit. This World) was a weekly news magazine published in Israel until 1993.

The magazine was founded in 1937 under the name Tesha BaErev (Hebrew: תשע בערב, Nine in the Evening) but was renamed HaOlam HaZeh in 1946. In 1950 it was bought by Uri Avnery, Shalom Cohen, and two others who soon withdrew.

Under Avnery's leadership, the magazine became famous for its highly unorthodox and irreverent style. Its news focussed on investigative reports, often presented in sensationalist fashion, which provoked anger from the Israeli establishment and disdain from Israel's mainstream press. Government ministers regularly called for it to be shut down, especially when it had exposed (or claimed to expose) some government scandal. For a few years, the government even secretly financed a rival magazine, Rimon, in a failed attempt to counter HaOlam HaZeh's popularity. Sometimes mainstream publications leaked to HaOlam HaZeh stories that they felt unable to publish themselves. Jacob Shavit writes that "from 1957 on, Ha-Olam ha-Zeh became the main forum" for advocacy of a Palestinian state.

Starting in 1959, the magazine had a "two cover" design, with the front cover presenting serious journalism and the back cover presenting sensational articles of a gossipy or sexual nature, sometimes displaying naked women. Under one of these back covers, titled "Special Report: The Lesbian Problem in Israel (Hebrew: "דו״ח מיוחד: הבעיה הלסבית בישראל"), the magazine covered the publication of Rina Ben-Menahem's first book, "HaDavka'im" (Hebrew: הדווקאים – The Spiteful Doers).

In the mid-1960s the papers owners, Avnery and Cohen entered politics, founding a new party, which they named after the paper: HaOlam HaZeh – Koah Hadash. Avnery was elected to the Knesset in the 1965 election and Cohen joined him when the party picked up another seat in the 1969 election. However, Cohen left the party in 1972 and the following year Avnery renamed it Meri.

An Arabic version of the magazine was published in the 1960s. At one point, Avnery dismissed its original editors for being too close to the communist parties. There was also a short-lived Spanish-language version titled Aseas, and a brief spinoff paper called Daf.

== Stories ==
Stories in which HaOlam HaZeh's reporting played an important part included the 1965 massacre at Qibya (after which Avnery and Cohen were allegedly beaten up by members of the IDF unit that had conducted the raid), the Kasztner libel trial, the Kafr Qasim massacre, and Ben Dunkelman's story about the aborted attempt to expel the inhabitants of Nazareth (in HaOlam HaZeh's July 1980 edition). In 1984 it was the first to publish one of the pictures of a prisoner being taken from Bus 300 disproving army statements that all the hijackers had died when the bus was stormed.
