= Gush Shalom =

Israeli peace activism group

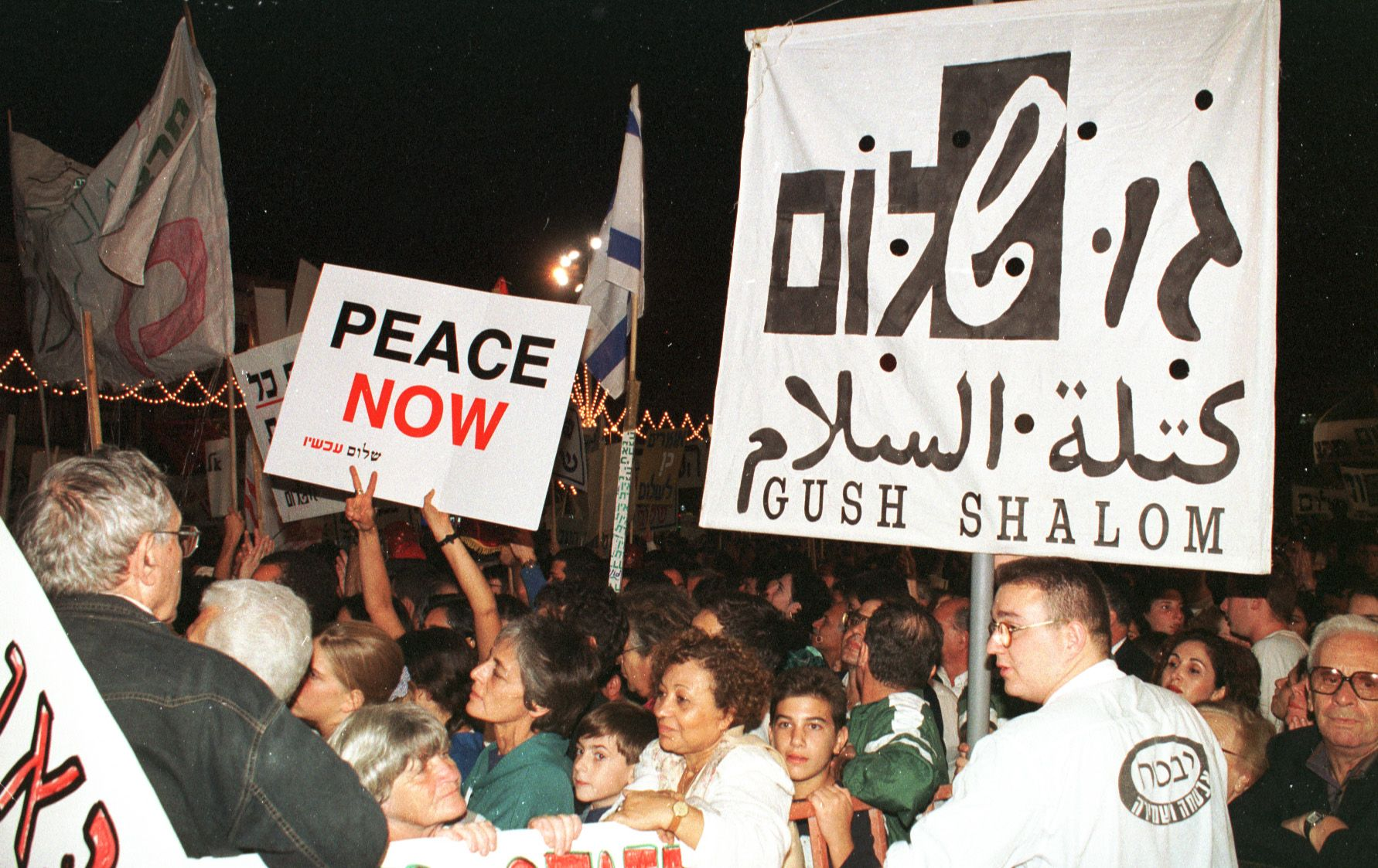
Gush Shalom and "Peace Now" activists during a demonstration supporting the Oslo accords, 1995

Gush Shalom (Hebrew: גוש שלום, lit. 'The Peace Bloc [Coalition]') is an Israeli peace activism group founded by Uri Avnery in 1993. Avnery–a former journalist, Irgun and Knesset member–also led the organization till his death in 2018. In 2010, the American Friends Service Committee has described the group as "one of Israel's most influential peace organizations".

== Organisation ==
The movement was established in 1993 by Uri Avnery. Avnery stated that he started Gush Shalom because other Israeli peace groups did not take a strong stance against what he considered "the repressive measures" of the government of Israeli prime minister Yitzhak Rabin.

Gush Shalom is an extra-parliamentary organization, independent of any party or other political grouping although it has members who are associated with various political parties.

== Stance ==
Gush Shalom objects to the Israeli occupation of the West Bank, and argues that the occupation is illegal and that Israel is committing war crimes on a daily basis. It opposes Israel's policies of blockade and non-recognition of the Gaza Strip. It supports a two-state solution to the Israel-Palestine question, with the Green Line as the border between Israel and Palestine (with minor exchanges of territories), and with Jerusalem as the capital of both states.

The movement supports soldiers' refusal to serve in the West Bank or Gaza Strip, recognition in principle of Palestinian right of return, and an Israeli withdrawal to the Green Line. Gush Shalom activists regularly confront Israeli security forces at construction sites in settlements in the West Bank and Gaza, and along the Separation Barrier. Gush Shalom said that Israel's offer to Yasser Arafat in the Camp David negotiations of 2000 was not a "generous offer" but "a humiliating demand for surrender", publishing the maps from the proposal (seldom published in the US), and an animation from the maps showing how little would be left for a Palestinian state under the proposal Avnery was among the first to meet and negotiate with PLO leader Yasser Arafat. In 2001 the organisation made a peace proposal on the basis of a two-state solution with the 1967 boundaries.

During the 2008–2009 Israel–Gaza conflict, Gush Shalom was a vigorous critic of the Israeli attack on Gaza. Avnery described it as "the Election War" since he believed it was intended to increase the election chances of Defence Minister Ehud Barak and Foreign Minister Tzipi Livni in the planned February elections.

Gush Shalom in one of numerous Israeli organizations pertaining to the radical left. It has been described as left-wing in the Israeli and US media.

Avnery wrote:

Every left-wing body fears with terror the one who is on its left. The right-wing of the Avoda party is afraid of its left-wing. The left wing is afraid of Meretz. Meretz is afraid of Yossi Beilin, who was pushed out of the Avoda by Amram Mitzna and his leftist friends and that Meretz also didn't give him a realist position on its list. Meretz is afraid of "Shalom Achshav". "Shalom Achshav" is afraid of "Gush Shalom" and the Arab parties.

== Praise and criticism ==
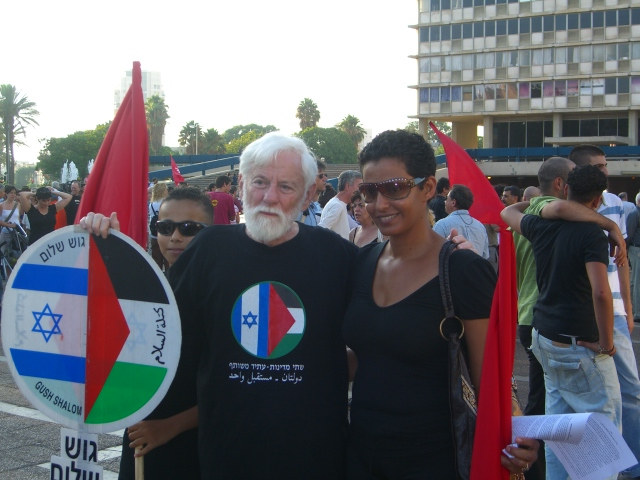
Uri Avnery at a Hadash rally against the 2006 Lebanon War

=== Praise ===
International human rights groups, including Amnesty International, American Friends Service Committee, and others, have lauded Gush Shalom for promoting peace and understanding between Israelis and Palestinians. The AFSC awarded Avnery the "Profiles of Peace" honor for his work for peace. The Haaretz newspaper publishes a weekly editorial statement by Gush Shalom in its weekend edition.

In 2001, Gush Shalom received the Right Livelihood Award "for their unwavering conviction, in the midst of violence, that peace can only be achieved through justice and reconciliation".

=== Criticism ===
Israeli journalist Uri Dan, a close friend and confidant of Ariel Sharon, described Gush Shalom in The Jerusalem Post as "lunatic fringe" due to the group's statement that they are monitoring Israeli soldiers' activities and will consider submitting collected evidence to international courts. Dan described the announcement as "preparing to inform on their brother soldiers – who are defending them too".

Isi Leibler, an influential Jewish leader and commentator, criticized the group for techniques that mirror images of the Soviet models, "exploit[ing] emotions" by creating bodies associated with 'mothers' and 'children', such as "Women in Black" and "Mothers against War". He stated this was done in order to further their interests under the guise of promoting peace, and noted that, in a similar manner, communists also encouraged draft evasion in democratic countries as Gush Shalom are doing. Leibler criticized the group members for "[believing] they and they alone represent the true apostles of peace and those opposing them are fascists, racists, and warmongers", further describing the group as "[part of] the radical wings of Israel's contemporary peace movement".
