= Uri Avnery =

Israeli politician, journalist and author (1923–2018)

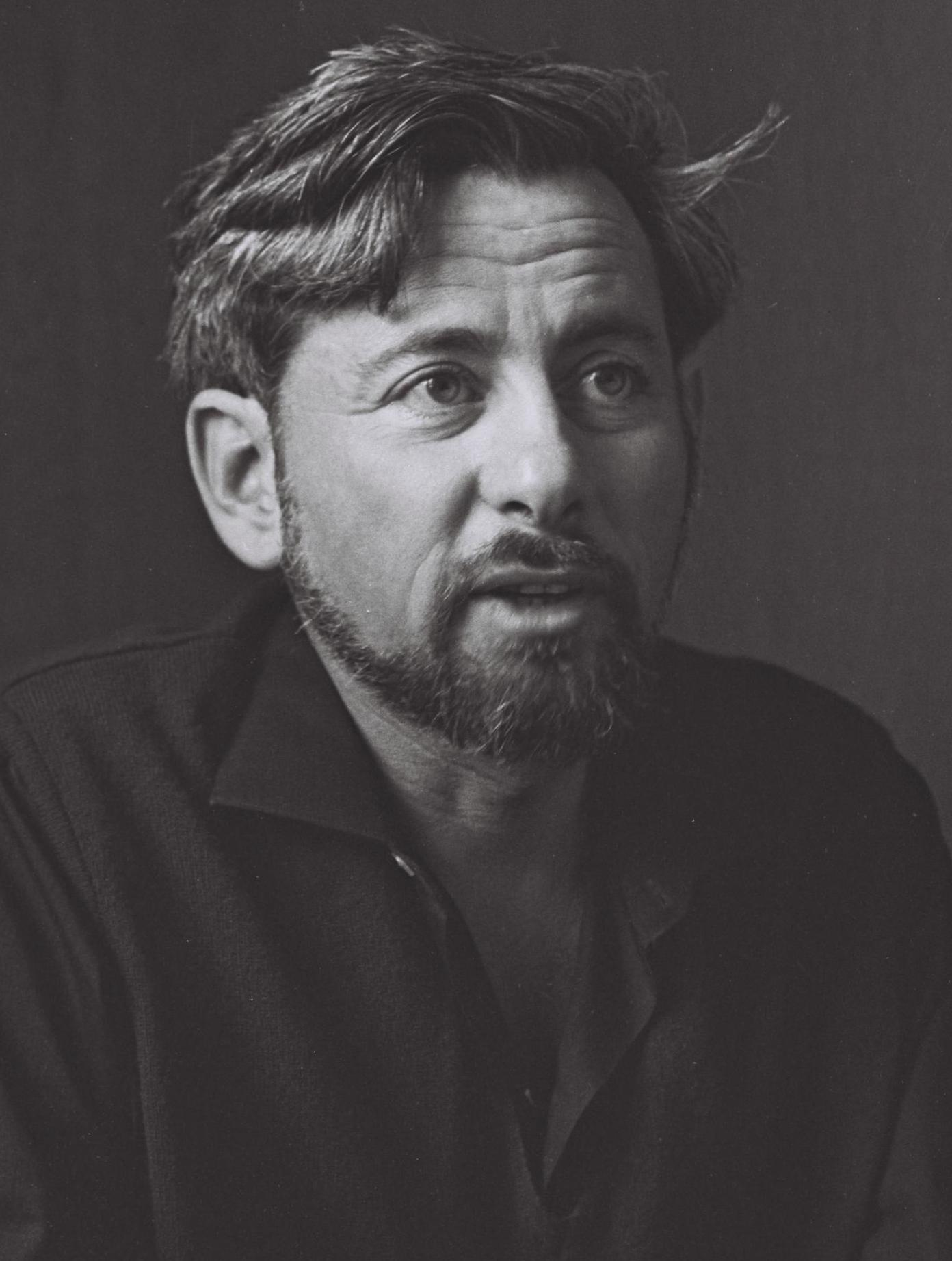
- Avnery in 1965

Faction represented in the Knesset
- 1965–1974: Meri
- 1977–1981: Left Camp of Israel

Personal details
- Born: 10 September 1923 Beckum, Germany
- Died: 20 August 2018 (aged 94) Tel Aviv, Israel

Uri Avnery (Hebrew: אורי אבנרי; 10 September 1923 – 20 August 2018) was an Israeli writer, journalist, politician, and activist, who founded the Gush Shalom peace movement. A member of the Irgun as a teenager and a veteran of the 1948 Palestine war, Avnery was a member of the Knesset for two spells from 1965 to 1974 and from 1979 to 1981. He was also the owner and editor of the news magazine HaOlam HaZeh from 1950 until its closure in 1993.

He became known for crossing the lines during the Siege of Beirut to meet Yasser Arafat on 3 July 1982, the first time the Palestinian leader met with an Israeli. Avnery was the author of several books about the Israeli–Palestinian conflict, including 1948: A Soldier's Tale, the Bloody Road to Jerusalem (2008); Israel's Vicious Circle (2008); and My Friend, the Enemy (1986).

He was awarded the Right Livelihood Award (better known informally as the Alternative Nobel Prize) in 2001 and the Carl von Ossietzky Medal in 2008.

== Early life ==
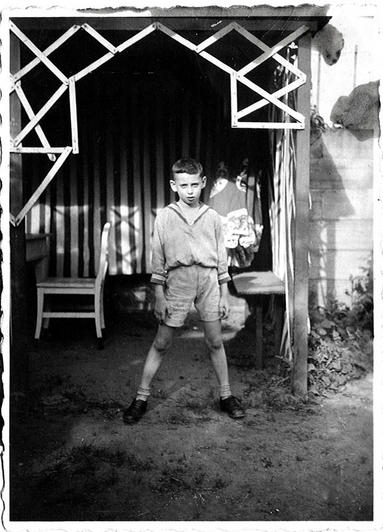
10 year old Helmut Ostermann, 1933.

Avnery was born in Beckum, near Münster in Westphalia, as Helmut Ostermann, the youngest of four children, to a well-established German Jewish family, his father being a private banker in the town. His grandfather, Josef Ostermann, was a teacher in Beckum's small Jewish community. His family roots are in Rhineland; his mother had once told him from which small Rhenish village his ancestors hailed, but he later forgot the name. He grew up in Hanover, where his father later worked as a court-appointed receiver. He counted among his companions Rudolf Augstein, the future proprietor of Der Spiegel. Avnery and his family emigrated to Mandatory Palestine in November 1933, following Adolf Hitler's rise to power. All his and his wife's relatives who did not leave Germany ended up dying in the Holocaust. He attended school in Nahalal and then in Tel Aviv, leaving after 7th grade, at age 14, in order to help his parents. He started work as a clerk for a lawyer, a job he held for about five years.

He joined the Irgun, a Zionist paramilitary group, in 1938, in reaction to the execution of Shlomo Ben-Yosef by the British authorities. Ben-Yosef had thrown a grenade (which failed to explode) into a bus carrying Arab women and children. However, unlike his comrade-in-arms Yitzhak Shamir who joined up at roughly the same time, Avnery was judged too young to engage directly in actions such as killing Jews suspected of being informers for the British authorities, and bombing Arab markets.

When Avnery was 16 years old, World War II broke out; it sparked in him a lifelong interest in military strategy, which he started studying in order to better follow events at the time. In 2006 he said he had over time read "a few hundred books" on the subject, by authors such as Sun Tzu, Clausewitz, Liddell-Hart and others. His only brother, Werner Ostermann, enlisted in the British Army during the war and was killed in Gondar while fighting on the East African front with No. 51 Commando in 1941. Uri subsequently changed his surname to Avnery, a Hebraic rendering of Werner, in memory of his brother.

Avnery left the Irgun in 1942 after becoming disenchanted with their tactics, stating in a 2003 interview that, "I didn't like the methods of terror applied by the Irgun at the time", noting he did not back killing people in retaliation for similar acts by the Arabs. From 1941 to 1946, he wrote for two far right wing newspapers, HaHevrah (Society) and BaMa'avak (In the Struggle). His early political thought was influenced by Canaanism.

Avnery abandoned Zionism at an early age, while remaining a nationalist, which he regarded as a natural feeling for desiring to belong to a collectivity, legitimate for Jews as it was for Arabs. As early as 1946 he coined the term Hishtalvut BaMerhav (integration into the region) to express the idea that the future state of the Jews must align itself within a broad "Semitic space" (Merhav HaShemi), a choice of terminology dictated by his perception that the region had been dominated by Western imperialism and colonialism. This "Semitic region" where he envisaged an alliance between Arab and Jewish national movements included Palestine, Transjordan, Lebanon, Syria, and Iraq. In 1947 Avnery founded his own small group, Eretz Yisrael HaTze'ira ("Young Land of Israel"), which published the journal Ma'avak ("Struggle").

=== Military service ===
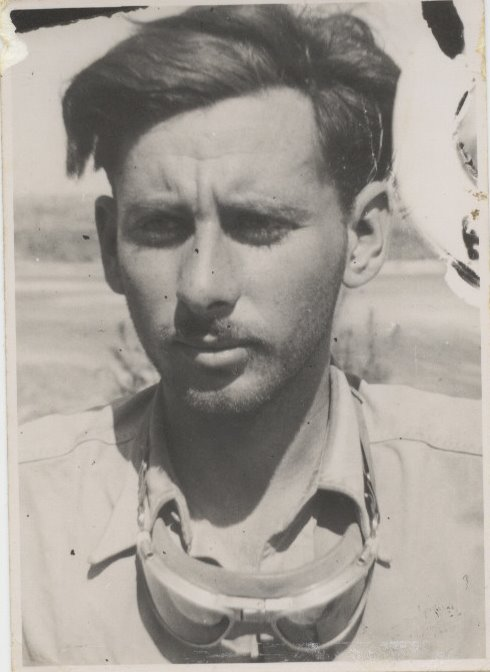
Avnery during his military service in 1948

During the 1948 Arab–Israeli War Avnery fought on the southern front in the Givati Brigade as a squad commander, and later in the Samson's Foxes commando unit (and also wrote its anthem, The Foxes of Shimshon, which has been called "one of the enduring battle anthems of the 1948 campaign"). He wrote dispatches from the front line which were published in Haaretz and later as a book, In the Fields of Philistia (Hebrew: בשדות פלשת, Bi-Sdot Pleshet). His experiences impressed him with the understanding that there was such a thing as the Palestinian people. They would enter villages where lighted fires and Primus cookers indicated that the inhabitants had fled minutes before. It was rational for them to flee because that is what all civilians do when fired on. Avnery was wounded twice, the second time, toward the end of the war, seriously; he spent the last months of his army service convalescing and was discharged in the summer of 1949.

== Career ==
=== Journalism career ===
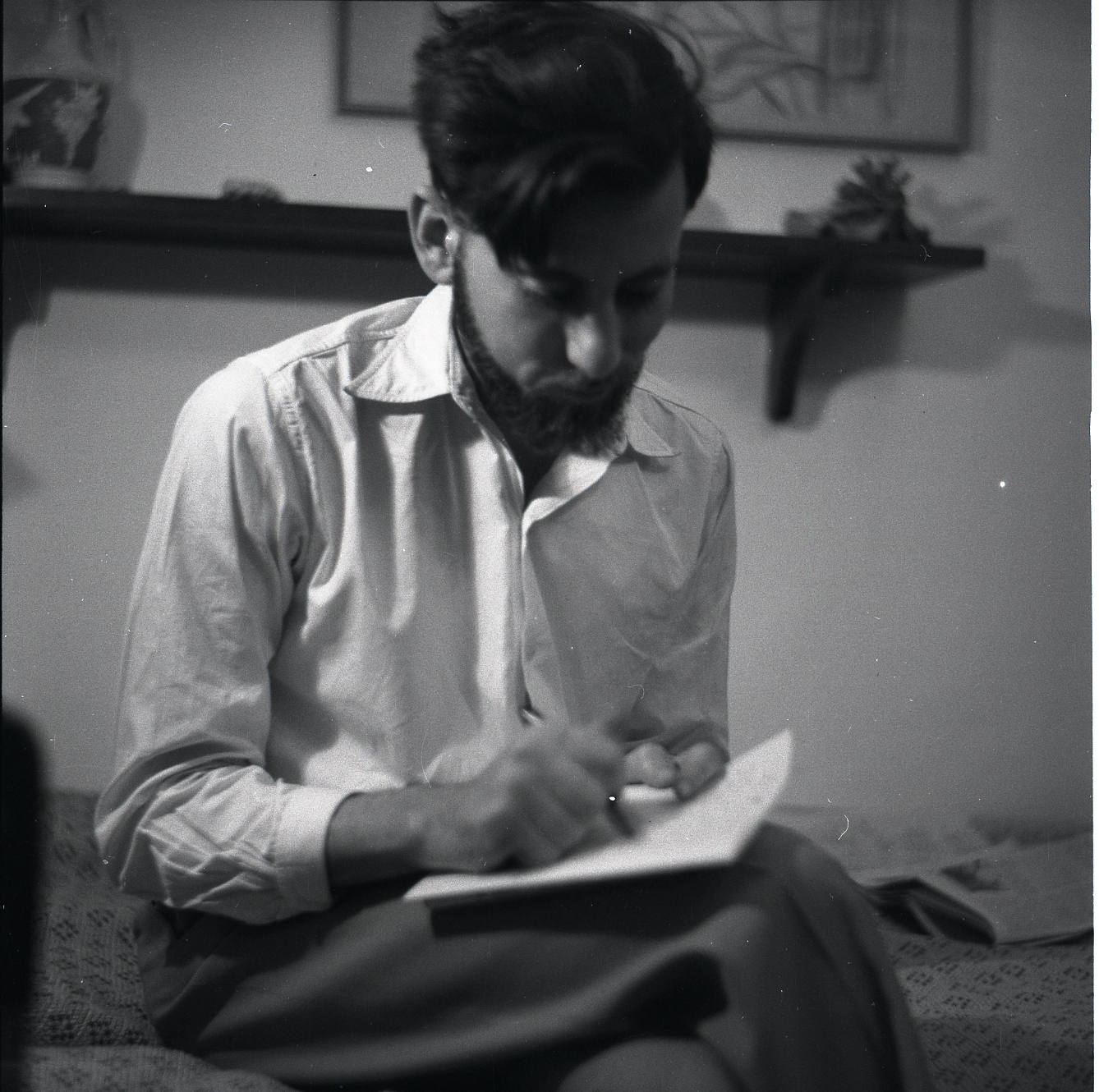
Avnery writing, 1950.

Though it was forbidden for soldiers to write for newspapers, Avnery wrote articles on his frontline experiences during the 1948 war. Shortly after his stint with that newspaper, Avnery (with Shalom Cohen and two others) in 1950 bought the failing magazine HaOlam HaZeh ("This World"). Avnery edited the weekly magazine, with its banner maxim "without fear, without bias," during the 1950s and the 1960s, turning it into an anti-establishment tabloid known for many sensational scoops. Its impact was such that David Ben-Gurion refused to mention it by name, and would only speak of "that particular magazine". The magazine was divided into two sections, the first half dealing with indepth muckraking journalistic investigations into corruption, the second half writing up titillating gossip. It featured nudes on its back cover.

The editorial office and printer of the paper were subject to three bombing attacks. He was arraigned on charges of sedition, survived two assassination attempts, and, in 1953, an unknown person—in one version he states that soldiers were involved—assaulted him, leaving him with both hands and all his fingers broken. Avnery introduced a punchy, aggressive style of newspaper writing into Israeli journalism and, according to Greer Fay, virtually every journalist who trained under him moved on to become a star elsewhere.

After the Egyptian Revolution of 1952 Avnery used his editorials in HaOlam HaZeh to call for a preventive strike against Egypt, arguing that "the reactionary Arab regimes" would attack Israel "the minute Arab superiority in weapons over Israel is great enough." He began to revise his views after the 1956 Suez Crisis, which ended in Israeli withdrawal and strengthened Nasser. In June 1957 Avnery suggested that Israel aid Palestinians in overthrowing the Hashemite monarchy in Jordan (a "product of imperialism"); Israel would then form a federation with the new Palestinian Jordanian state. In the late 1950s Avnery was among the founders of the group Semitic Action, which argued for a regional federation of Israel and its neighbors.

=== Knesset ===
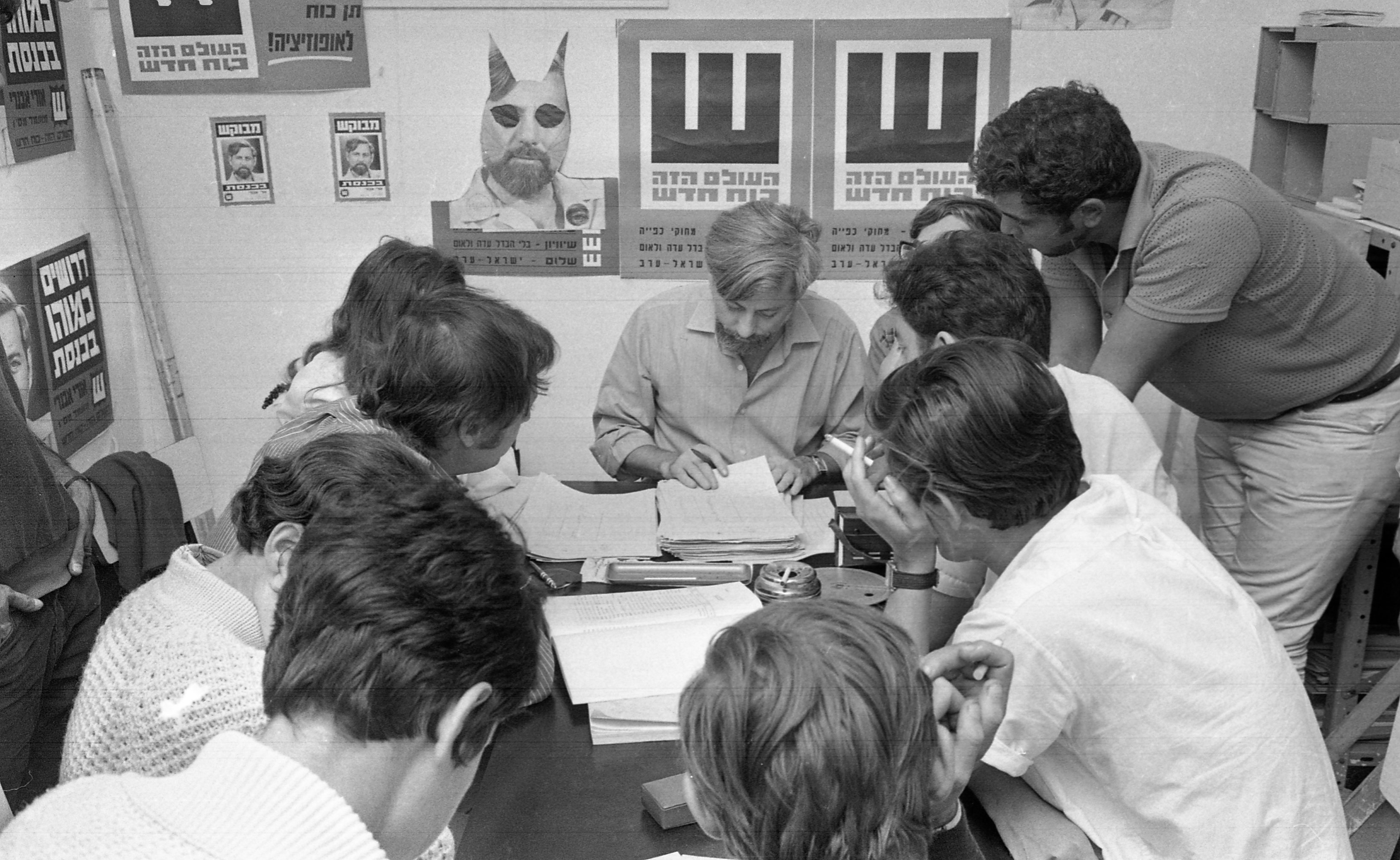
On election day, 1969.

In 1965, Avnery created a political party bearing the name of his and Cohen's magazine, HaOlam HaZeh – Koah Hadash, and was elected to the Knesset in the 1965 election. The move was inspired by the passage in 1965 of a Law against Defamation in Israel, which Avnery took personally as a legislative measure designed to muzzle his newspaper's reportage. The dominant focus of his criticism was the Mapai establishment. Although he retained his seat in the 1969 election, the party disintegrated and Avnery renamed it Meri. Although it failed to win any seats in the 1973 elections, Avnery returned to the Knesset as a member of the Sheli party after the 1977 election, but did not retain his seat in the 1981 election. He was later involved in the Progressive List for Peace. He wrote a book of his early period in parliament, entitled 1 against 119: Uri Avnery in the Knesset, (1969).

=== Israel–Palestine peace activism ===
Meeting with Yassir Arafat in Beirut, July 1982

By the 1970s, Avnery came to think that Zionism—an ideology centered on the ingathering of the exiles—was effectively dead, since diaspora Jews in significant numbers were no longer performing aliyah. Avnerey considers his ideology to be post-Zionism, and he states that he may have been the first to use that word. In late 1975 he was among the founders of the Israeli Council for Israeli–Palestinian Peace. Shortly after the group's founding, Avnery was assaulted and stabbed several times.

Avnery crossed the front lines and met Yasser Arafat on 3 July 1982, during the Siege of Beirut—said to have been the first time an Israeli met personally with Arafat. He was tracked by an Israeli intelligence team which intended to kill Arafat, even if it meant killing Avnery at the same time once the latter had inadvertently led them to Arafat's hide-out. The operation, "Salt Fish", failed when the PLO managed to lose their trackers in the alleyways of Beirut.

Robert Fisk interviewed Avnery at the time, when the Sabra and Shatila massacre took place, and asked him how survivors of the Holocaust and their children could look on as 1,700 Palestinians were massacred. He replied:

"I will tell you something about the Holocaust. It would be nice to believe that people who have undergone suffering have been purified by suffering. But it's the opposite, it makes them worse. It corrupts. There is something in suffering that creates a kind of egoism. Herzog [the Israeli president at the time] was speaking at the site of the concentration camp at Bergen-Belsen but he spoke only about the Jews. How could he not mention that others – many others – had suffered there? Sick people, when they are in pain, cannot speak about anyone but themselves. And when such monstrous things have happened to your people, you feel nothing can be compared to it. You get a moral "power of attorney", a permit to do anything you want – because nothing can compare to what has happened to us. This is a moral immunity which is very clearly felt in Israel."

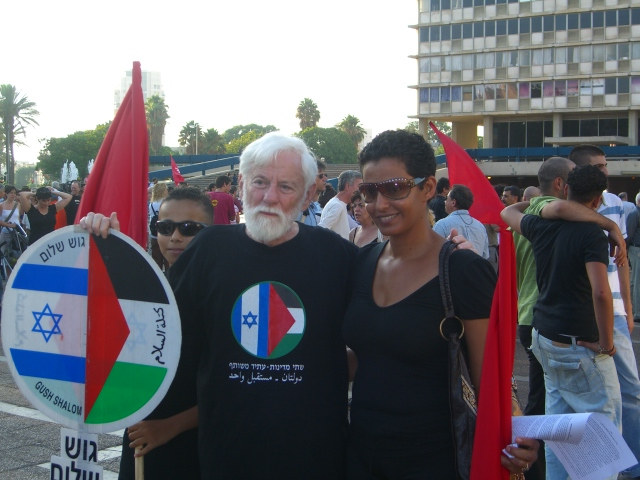
Avnery at a Hadash rally against the 2006 Lebanon War

His visit with Arafat was among the reasons he became estranged from his mother, Hilda Ostermann, who disinherited him. She did not learn Hebrew and knew nothing of politics other than what she gleaned from a German-language nationalist newsletter. To meet the Palestinian leader he had to forsake his regular Friday visit to his mother in Rehovot. In her will, Hilda wrote "I do not leave a penny to my son Uri, who instead of taking care of me went off to visit that murderer Yasser Arafat". However, his sister gave him his share of the inheritance.

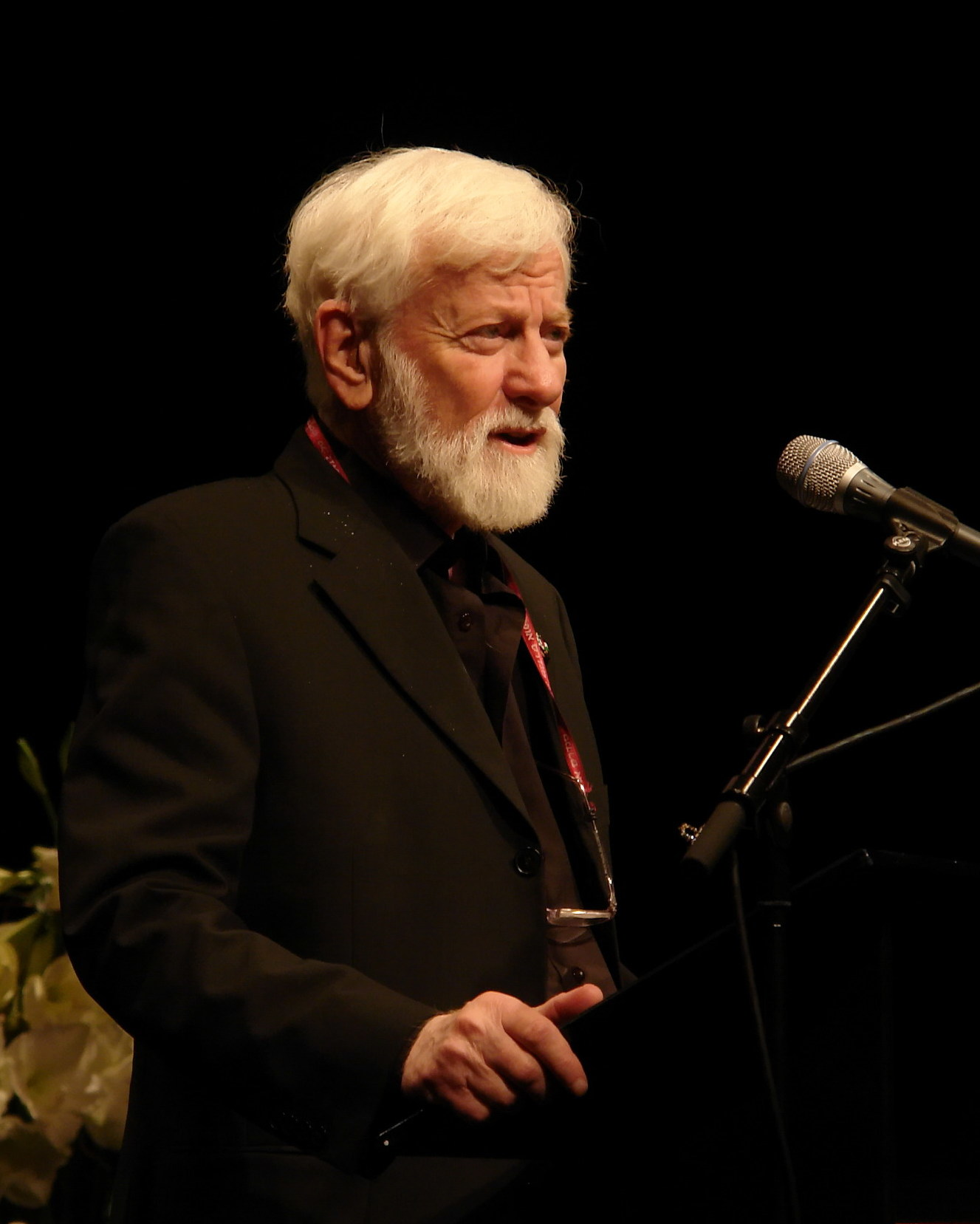
Avnery giving a speech upon receiving the Carl von Ossietzky Medal, Berlin, 2008

He later turned to left-wing peace activism and founded the Gush Shalom movement in 1993, and argued that every Israeli settlement was a "landmine on the road to peace". He was a secularist and strongly opposed to the Orthodox influence in religious and political life.

In 2001, Avnery and his wife Rachel Avnery were honoured with the Right Livelihood Award "for their unwavering conviction, in the midst of violence, that peace can only be achieved through justice and reconciliation". In 2006, settler activist Baruch Marzel called on the Israeli military to carry out "a targeted killing" against Avnery.

He advocated negotiations with Hamas. In 2007 Gush Shalom had a sticker printed which read: "Talk to Hamas". Avnery himself had once, in 1993, addressed in Gaza an audience of 500 bearded sheikhs, who listened as he spoke to them in Hebrew, and, applauding him, invited him to lunch.

== Later years ==
Avnery was a contributor to the news and opinion sites such as for CounterPunch.

In April 2018, Avnery wrote a column for CounterPunch criticizing the Israeli military for their response to the 2018 Gaza border protests. He wrote: "I dissociate myself from the [Israeli] army sharpshooters who murder unarmed demonstrators along the Gaza Strip, and from their commanders, who give them the orders, up to the commander in chief".

On 4 August 2018, Avnery suffered a stroke and was hospitalized in a critical condition in Tel Aviv. He died at Ichilov Hospital on 20 August 2018 at the age of 94, less than a month short of his 95th birthday.

In accordance to his wishes, he was cremated and his ashes were scattered off the coast of Tel Aviv.

== Personal life ==
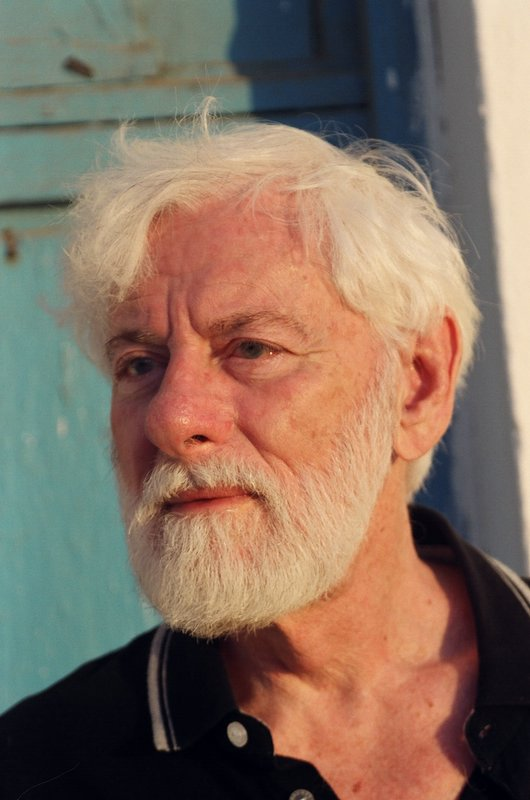
Uri Avnery in 2006

Avnery's life with his Berlin-born companion Rachel (née Greenboim) lasted 58 years, five of them before they married. In 1995 he stated proudly that they were the only Israeli couple he knew who were not divorced. They first met when she was 14 years old, in 1946, she being the daughter of the landlord of the house where one of the members of his Semitic nation group lived and where they went to discuss ideas. Around 1951, they crossed paths again when a director of a theatrical troupe introduced her as a possible choice for a photograph required for an ad his magazine intended to run. When he failed, some time later, to turn up for a date, she went to his office and learned he had had all his fingers broken. She took care of him, and they lived together for 5 years; they were both averse to religion and, in Israel, civil marriages are not permitted, so they could not get married in a way they could accept. They formalized their relationship privately with a rabbi to set Rachel's father's mind at rest when the latter fell ill.

Avnery said her outstanding trait was empathy, something he illustrated by an anecdote of watching a film (Note: Editor's note: This appears be an allusion to Kadár and Klos's The Shop on Main Street (1965)) concerning an old woman in the Slovak Republic who does not understand a deportation order, and neighbours assist her in going to the assembly point for departure to the death camps. At the end, when the lights came on, Menachem Begin happened to be sitting in a row in front of them. He stood up, weeping, and came over and kissed her on the brow. The gesture of kissing her on the brow was repeated by Yasser Arafat when she and her husband acted as human shields when he was under siege and holed up in the Mukataa. She earned the respect and friendship of Raed Salah during tent protests against Yitzhak Rabin's deportation of 415 Palestinians to Lebanon in December 1992. She was a primary school teacher for 28 years. She died in May 2011 of the long-term debilitating effects of a Hepatitis C infection contracted some two decades earlier. Their marriage was childless by choice.

Avnery suffered from both diabetes and Crohn's disease. In his testament he willed his assets and savings to the people of Israel, to finance further peace projects.

== See also ==
- Adam Keller
- Amnon Kapeliouk
- List of peace activists
- Mordechai Vanunu
- Uri Davis

== Sources ==
- Aderet, Ofer (9 August 2018a). "Left-wing Peace Activist Uri Avnery Hospitalized in Critical Condition". Haaretz. Archived from the original on 9 August 2018.
- Aderet, Ofer (20 August 2018b). "Uri Avnery, Veteran Peace Activist and Among First Israelis to Meet Arafat, Dies at 94". Haaretz.
- Avnery, Uri (1975). Israel and the Palestinians: A Different Israeli View. Breira.
- Avnery, Uri (1986). My friend, the enemy. Zed Books. ISBN 978-0-862-32215-1.
- Avnery, Uri (2008). Powell, Sara R. (ed.). Israel's Vicious Circle: Ten Years of Writings on Israel and Palestine. Pluto Press. ISBN 978-0-745-32823-2.
- Avnery, Uri (4 June 2011). "Rachel". Gush Shalom.
- Avnery, Uri (13–15 July 2012). "The Most Successful Terrorist of the 20th Century". CounterPunch.
- Avnery, Uri (2013). 1948. A Soldier's Tale? The Bloody Road to Jerusalem. Oneworld Publications. ISBN 978-1-780-74444-5.
- Avnery, Uri (16 April 2018). "Eyeless in Gaza". CounterPunch.
- Bar-On, Mordechai (1996). In Pursuit of Peace: A History of the Israeli Peace Movement. US Institute of Peace Press. ISBN 978-1-878-37953-5.
- Benn, Aluf (21 August 2018). "Uri Avnery, Shaper of the Israeli Consciousness". Haaretz.
- Bergman, Ronen (23 January 2018). "How Arafat Eluded Israel's Assassination Machine". New York Times Magazine.
- Cashman, Greer Fay (20 August 2018). "Warrior for Peace: Uri Avnery Passes Away at 94". The Jerusalem Post.
- Davis, Uri (2003). Apartheid Israel: Possibilities for the Struggle Within. Zed Books. ISBN 978-1-842-77339-0.
- Diamond, James S. (March–April 1990). "We Are Not One: A Post-Zionist Perspective; A Review of Boaz Evron, HaKheshbon HaLe'umi". Tikkun. Vol. 2, no. 2. pp. 106–110. Archived from the original on 30 August 2011.
- Elmer, Jon (1 April 2004). "Uri Avnery Interview". The Progressive.
- Fishman-Duker, Rivkah (Spring 2011). "The Missing Link: Uri Avnery, Israel, and Yasir Arafat". Jewish Political Studies Review. 23 (1/2): 107–113. Archived from the original on 20 August 2018.
- Fisk, Robert (20 August 2018). "Uri Avnery, the Israeli optimist who played chess with Yasser Arafat, has died – he was one of my few Middle East heroes". The Independent.
- Glass, Charles (Winter 1975–1976). "Jews against Zion: Israeli Jewish Anti-Zionism". Journal of Palestine Studies. 5 (1/2): 56–81. doi:10.2307/2535683. JSTOR 2535683.
- "Gush Shalom/Uri and Rachel Avnery (Israel)". The Right Livelihood Award. 2001. Archived from the original on 17 November 2008.
- Hunt, Scott (2004). The Future of Peace: On the Front Lines with the World's Great Peacemakers. HarperCollins. ISBN 978-0-062-51742-5.
- "Israel's symbol of the hard Left, Uri Avnery, passes away at age 94". Ynet. 20 August 2018.
- Kaminer, Reuven (1996). The Politics of Protest: The Israeli Peace Movement and the Palestinian Intifada. Sussex Academic Press. ISBN 978-1-898-72329-5.
- Karpel, Dalia (25 April 2014). "Uri Avnery at 90: Still Leftist, After All These Years". Haaretz.
- Kaufhold, Roland (2003). "Uri Avnery: Ein Porträt". In Avnery, Uri (ed.). Ein Leben für den Frieden: Klartexte über Israel und Palästina. Heidelberg: Palmyra. pp. 258–287.
- Knesset (2008). "Uri Avnery (Ostermann)". Knesset.
- Lefort, Bernard; Avnery, Uri (January 1982). "Les Palestiniens existent: Entretien avec Uri Avnery". Esprit (in French). Vol. 61, no. 1. pp. 146–150. JSTOR 24268527.
- Nakdimon, Shlomo (17 February 2011). "Politics / the Third Side of the Coin: Did journalist and peace activist Uri Avnery serve a communist agenda in his weekly news magazine Haolam Hazeh?". Haaretz. Archived from the original on 20 August 2018.
- Nocke, Alexandra (2009). The Place of the Mediterranean in Modern Israeli Identity. Brill. ISBN 978-9-047-42671-4.
- Shalev, Chemi (20 August 2018). "Uri Avnery: Peace Activist, Pioneering Journalist and Inconvenient Patriot". Haaretz. Archived from the original on 20 August 2018.
- Shavit, Jacob (1987). The new Hebrew nation: a study in Israeli heresy and fantasy. Psychology Press. ISBN 978-0-7146-3302-2.
- Steele, Jonathan (21 August 2018). "Uri Avnery obituary". The Guardian.
- "Trailblazing peace activist, writer, and former MK Uri Avnery dies at 94". The Times of Israel. 20 August 2018.
- "Uri Avnery - Biography". Gush Shalom.
- Weiss, Efrat (20 March 2006). "Marzel to cabinet: Kill left-wing leader". Ynet.
