= Nahshonim =

Kibbutz in central Israel

Nahshonim: נַחְשׁוֹנִים (Hebrew)
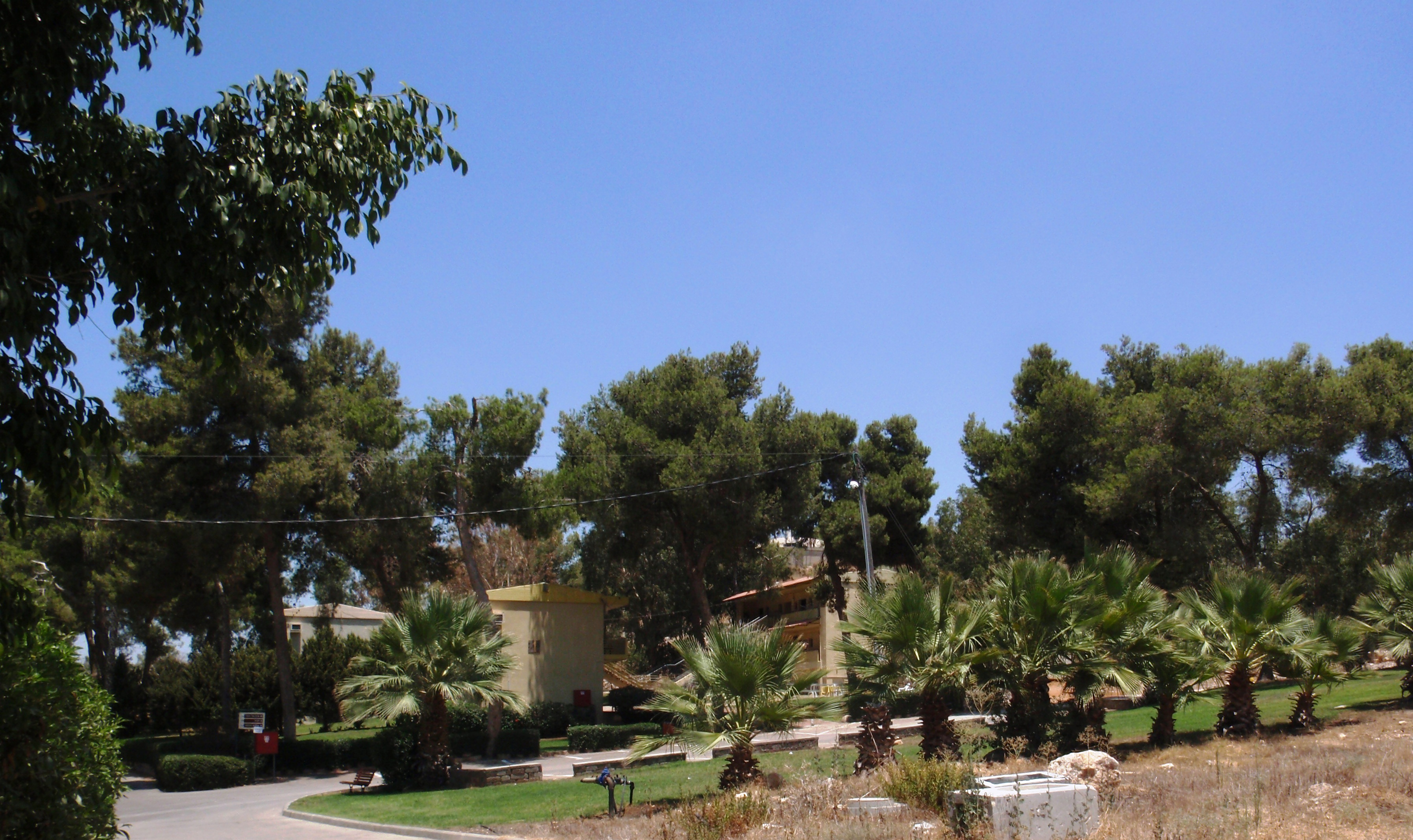

- Location within Central Israel
- Coordinates: 32°3′36″N 34°56′52″E
- Country: Israel
- District: Central
- Subdistrict: Petah Tikva
- Council: Drom HaSharon
- Affiliation: Kibbutz Movement
- Founded: 1949
- Founder: Egyptian Jewish immigrants
- Population (2024): 484

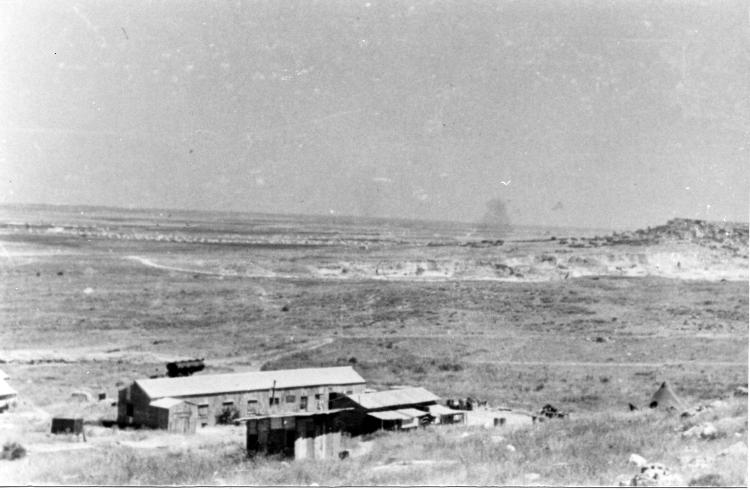
Nahshonim in 1948

Nahshonim (Hebrew: נַחְשׁוֹנִים, lit. 'Pioneers') is a kibbutz in central Israel. Located in the south of the Sharon plain near Rosh HaAyin, it falls under the jurisdiction of Drom HaSharon Regional Council. In 2024 it had a population of 484.

== History ==
Kibbutz Nahshonim was founded in 1949 by a group largely made up of Egyptian Jewish immigrants and refugees, as well as a few Jews born in Israel. They chose the name, well aware of its roots in the biblical pioneer Nahshon, who helped Moses during the Exodus from Egypt.

It is well known in Israel for its motor park and the "Nahshonit" entertainment park.

== Notable residents ==
- Harel Levy (born 1978), tennis player and Davis Cup team captain
- Shalom Cohen (politician)
- Antonio Negri, Italian political philosopher
