= Moked =

Moked מוקד
- Leader: Shmuel Mikunis; Meir Pa'il
- Founded: 1973
- Dissolved: 1977
- Merger of: Maki and Blue-Red Movement
- Merged into: Left Camp of Israel
- Ideology: Socialism (Israeli); Pacifism (Israeli); Labor Zionism (factions)
- Political position: Left-wing (Note: Moked was also referred to as far-left due to its succession of Maki and its support for Palestinian self-determination)
- Most MKs: 1 (1973-1977)
- Fewest MKs: 1 (1973-1977)

Election symbol
- קנ

Moked (Hebrew: מוקד, lit. 'Focus') was a left-wing political party in Israel.

== Background ==
Moked came into existence on 25 July 1973 during the seventh Knesset, when the Maki parliamentary group (which had one seat, held by Shmuel Mikunis) was renamed Moked, following its merger with the extraparliamentary Blue-Red Movement, a faction of the Siah (New Left) movement, headed by students, with Ran Cohen as a leading figure. Journalist Amos Oz was a member of Moked.

The new party ran in the 1973 elections, receiving 1.4% of the vote and winning one seat, which was taken by Meir Pa'il, who was top of the party list. Mikunis (in second place), Cohen (third) Yair Tzaban (fourth), Avishai Margalit (fifteenth) and Binyamin Temkin (twenty-third) all failed to be elected. In 1974, Mikunis left Moked, accusing it of being too Zionist, instead joining his fellow ex-Maki politician Esther Vilenska in her Israeli Communist Opposition (Aki). In October 1975 the party changed its name to Moked - for Peace and Social Compensation.

Prior to the 1977 elections Moked dissolved into the Left Camp of Israel (Sheli), while at the same time, Aki merged into the Hadash communist coalition, led by Rakah. Sheli won two seats, with Pa'il taking one in rotation. Sheli disintegrated after failing to win any seats in the 1981 elections. Pa'il retired from politics after the failure, Cohen, Temkin and Tzaban eventually became Meretz MKs in 1992, the former two through Ratz and the latter through Mapam.
