= List of members of the ninth Knesset =

The 120 members of the ninth Knesset were elected on 17 May 1977. The breakdown by party was as follows:

- Likud: 43
- Alignment: 32
- Democratic Movement for Change: 15
- National Religious Party: 12
- Hadash: 5
- Agudat Yisrael: 4
- United Arab List: 1
- Flatto-Sharon: 1*
- Shlomtzion: 2
- Left Camp of Israel: 2
- Poalei Agudat Yisrael: 1
- Ratz: 1
- Independent Liberals: 1

* Flatto-Sharon won enough votes for two seats, but was a one-man list

== List of members ==
Member	Party	Notes
Moshe Arens	Likud	
Yoram Aridor	Likud	
Elyakim Badian	Likud	
Menachem Begin	Likud	
Yitzhak Berman	Likud	
Geula Cohen	Likud	Left party to sit as an independent, before establishing Tehiya
Meir Cohen-Avidov	Likud	
Yigal Cohen-Orgad	Likud	
Yigal Cohen	Likud	
Haim Corfu	Likud	
Michael Dekel	Likud	
Sarah Doron	Likud	
Simha Erlich	Likud	
Yehezkel Flomin	Likud	
Pesah Grupper	Likud	
Yigal Hurvitz	Likud	Left party to re-establish Rafi, before defecting to Telem
Moshe Katsav	Likud	
Avraham Katz	Likud	
Haim Kaufman	Likud	
David Levy	Likud	
Amnon Linn	Likud	
Eitan Livni	Likud	
Moshe Meron	Likud	
Roni Milo	Likud	
Yitzhak Moda'i	Likud	
Amal Nasser el-Din	Likud	
Moshe Nissim	Likud	
Ehud Olmert	Likud	
Gideon Patt	Likud	
Yitzhak Peretz	Likud	Left party to re-establish Rafi, before returning to Likud
Shmuel Rechtman	Likud	
Yosef Rom	Likud	
Menachem Savidor	Likud	
Hillel Seidel	Likud	
Moshe Shamir	Likud	Left party to sit as an independent, before establishing Tehiya
Yitzhak Shamir	Likud	
Avraham Sharir	Likud	
Dov Shilansky	Likud	
Eliezer Shostak	Likud	
Zalman Shoval	Likud	Left party to re-establish Rafi, before defecting to Telem
Yosef Tamir	Likud	Left party to join Shinui, before sitting as an independent
Mordechai Tzipori	Likud	
Ezer Weizman	Likud	
Yigal Allon	Alignment	
Moshe Amar	Alignment	
Jacques Amir	Alignment	
Adiel Amorai	Alignment	
Shoshana Arbeli-Almozlino	Alignment	
Haim Bar-Lev	Alignment	
Uzi Baram	Alignment	
Moshe Dayan	Alignment	Left party to sit as an independent before establishing Telem
Abba Eban	Alignment	
Tamar Eshel	Alignment	
Naftali Feder	Alignment	
Haika Grossman	Alignment	
Menachem Hacohen	Alignment	
Amos Hadar	Alignment	
Michael Harish	Alignment	
Shlomo Hillel	Alignment	
Yeruham Meshel	Alignment	
Eliyahu Moyal	Alignment	
Ora Namir	Alignment	
Yitzhak Navon	Alignment	
Shimon Peres	Alignment	
Yitzhak Rabin	Alignment	
Yehoshua Rabinovitz	Alignment	
Daniel Rosolio	Alignment	
Yossi Sarid	Alignment	
Moshe Shahal	Alignment	
Eliyahu Speiser	Alignment	
Meir Talmi	Alignment	
Gad Yaacobi	Alignment	
Aharon Yadlin	Alignment	
Yehezkel Zakai	Alignment	
Haim Yosef Zadok	Alignment	
Meir Amit	Democratic Movement for Change	When party split, joined Shinui, then defected to the Alignment
Shafik Assad	Democratic Movement for Change	When party split, joined Democratic Movement, before defecting to Ahva and then Telem
Zeidan Atashi	Democratic Movement for Change	When party split, joined Shinui
Mordechai Elgrably	Democratic Movement for Change	When party split, joined Democratic Movement, before sitting as an independent, and then joining the Unity Party
David Golomb	Democratic Movement for Change	When party split, joined Shinui, then defected to the Alignment
Binyamin Halevi	Democratic Movement for Change	When party split, joined Democratic Movement, before sitting as an independent
Akiva Nof	Democratic Movement for Change	When party split, joined Democratic Movement, before defecting to Ahva and then Likud
Amnon Rubinstein	Democratic Movement for Change	When party split, joined Shinui
Shmuel Tamir	Democratic Movement for Change	When party split, joined Democratic Movement, before sitting as an independent
Shmuel Toledano	Democratic Movement for Change	When party split, joined Shinui
Mordechai Virshubski	Democratic Movement for Change	When party split, joined Shinui
Stef Wertheimer	Democratic Movement for Change	When party split, joined Shinui
Yigael Yadin	Democratic Movement for Change	When party split, joined Democratic Movement, before sitting as an independent
Assaf Yaguri	Democratic Movement for Change	When party split, joined Ya'ad
Meir Zorea	Democratic Movement for Change	
Aharon Abuhatzira	National Religious Party	
Eliezer Avtabi	National Religious Party	
Yehuda Ben-Meir	National Religious Party	
Yosef Burg	National Religious Party	
Haim Drukman	National Religious Party	
David Glass	National Religious Party	
Zevulun Hammer	National Religious Party	
Avraham Melamed	National Religious Party	
Ben-Zion Rubin	National Religious Party	
Pinhas Scheinman	National Religious Party	
Sara Stern-Katan	National Religious Party	
Zerach Warhaftig	National Religious Party	
Charlie Biton	Hadash	
Hanna Mwais	Hadash	
Tawfik Toubi	Hadash	
Meir Vilner	Hadash	
Tawfiq Ziad	Hadash	
Yehuda Meir Abramovicz	Agudat Yisrael	
Shlomo-Ya'akov Gross	Agudat Yisrael	
Shlomo Lorincz	Agudat Yisrael	
Menachem Porush	Agudat Yisrael	
Aryeh Eliav	Left Camp of Israel	
Meir Pa'il	Left Camp of Israel	
Ariel Sharon	Shlomtzion	Party merged into Likud
Yitzhak Yitzhaky	Shlomtzion	Party merged into Likud, but Yitzhaky broke away to establish One Israel
Shmuel Flatto-Sharon	Development and Peace	
Shulamit Aloni	Ratz	
Gideon Hausner	Independent Liberals	
Kalman Kahana	Poalei Agudat Yisrael	
Seif el-Din el-Zoubi	United Arab List	

=== Replacements ===
MK	Replaced	Date	Party	Notes
Emry Ron	Haim Yosef Zadok	2 January 1978	Alignment	
Shlomo Eliyahu	Meir Zorea	15 February 1978	Democratic Movement for Change	When party split, joined the Democratic Movement, before defecting to Ahva
Avraham Katz-Oz	Yitzhak Navon	18 April 1978	Alignment	Navon was elected president
Ze'ev Katz	Aharon Yadlin	12 January 1979	Alignment	
Uri Avnery	Aryeh Eliav	31 January 1979	Left Camp of Israel	
Hamad Abu Rabia	Seif el-Din el-Zoubi	3 April 1979	United Arab List	
David Stern	Shmuel Rechtman	18 June 1979	Likud	
Esther Herlitz	Yehoshua Rabinovitz	14 August 1979	Alignment	
Yehuda Hashai	Yigal Allon	29 February 1980	Alignment	
Saadia Marciano	Meir Pa'il	19 May 1980	Left Camp of Israel	Left party to establish the Unity Party
Jabr Muadi	Hamad Abu Rabia	12 January 1981	United Arab List	
Walid Haj Yahia	Uri Avnery	13 February 1981	Left Camp of Israel	
Avraham Levenbraun	Hanna Mwais	13 February 1981	Hadash	
Stella Levy	Stef Wertheimer	20 February 1981	Shinui	
