= Stella Levy =

Israeli politician (1924–1999)

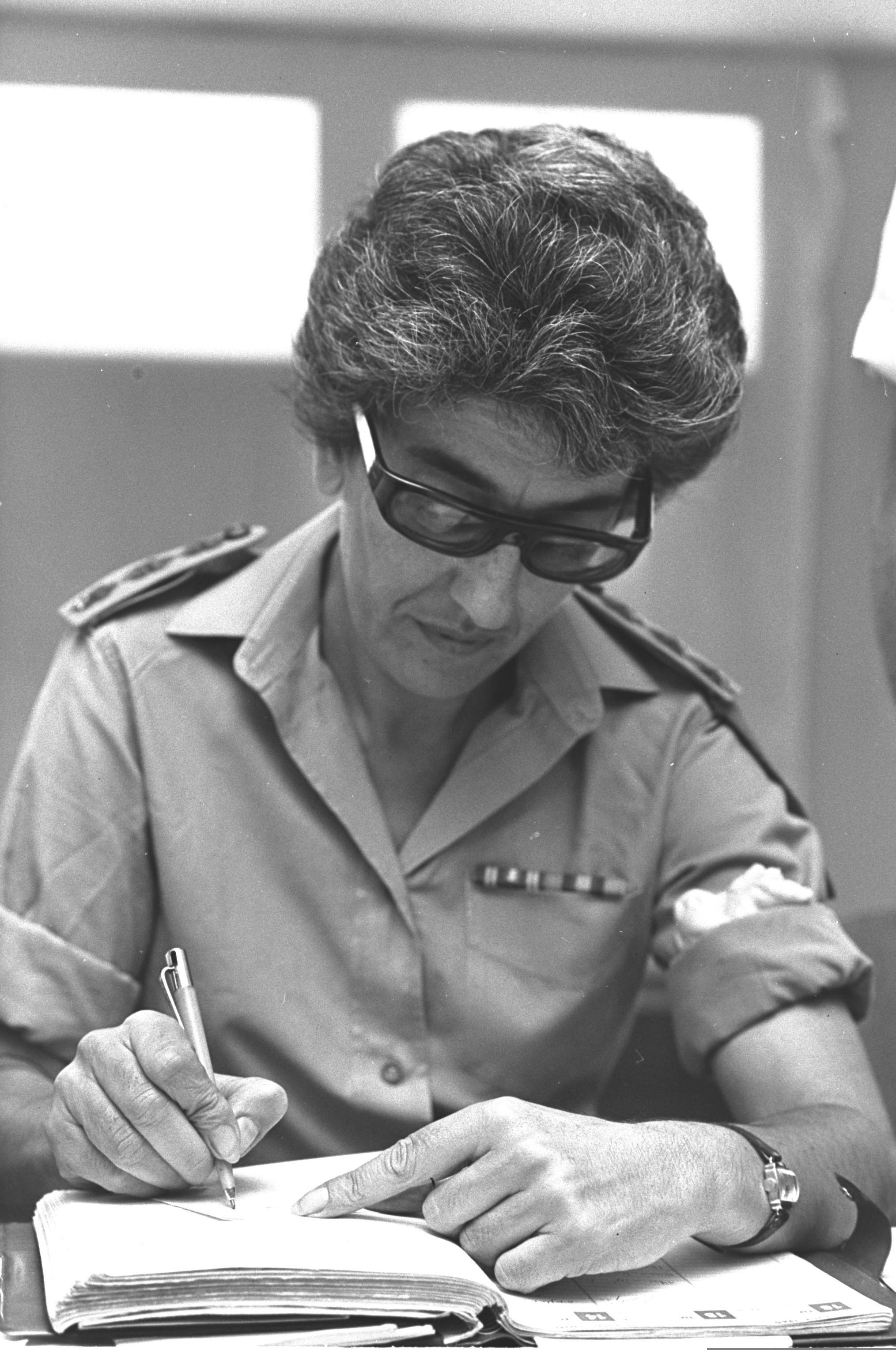
- Levy in 1965

Faction represented in the Knesset
- 1981: Shinui

Personal details
- Born: 1924 Syria
- Died: 19 July 1999 (aged 74–75)

Stella Levy (Hebrew: סטלה לוי; 1924 – 19 July 1999) was an Israeli soldier and politician.

== Biography ==
Born in Syria in 1924, Levy emigrated to Mandatory Palestine in 1929. She attended the Hebrew Reali School in Haifa and later studied psychology at the University of Haifa and political science and art at Tel Aviv University.

Levy joined the Haganah during her youth and during World War II served in the Communications Corps of the British Army between 1942 and 1946. After Israeli independence in 1948 she completed the first IDF officers' training course, and commanded the Women's Corps platoon of the Carmel Brigade between 1948 and 1949. She completed a battalion commanders course in 1949 and in 1951 became head of the Women's Corps in the Northern Command. From 1964 until 1970 she served as commander of the Women's Corps. Between 1970 and 1974 she worked as a military emissary to the United States, before being demobilised with the rank of colonel in 1974.

In 1974 she helped form the Civil Guard subdivision of Israel Police and served in it until 1976. The following year she joined the Democratic Movement for Change. She was seventeenth on the party's list for the 1977 Knesset elections, but the party won only 15 seats. However, she entered the Knesset on 20 February 1981 as a replacement for Stef Wertheimer, and chose to join the Shinui faction (the Democratic Movement of Change had split into several parties in 1978). She was placed fifth on the Shinui list for the June 1981 elections, but the party won only two seats. She remained active in the party and was eleventh on the party's list for the 1984 elections.

Outside politics Levy was also a member of the Zionist Executive Committee and on the board of the Israeli branch of the World Jewish Congress. She died in July 1999.
