= Naftali Feder =

Israeli politician (1920–2009)

- נפתלי פדר
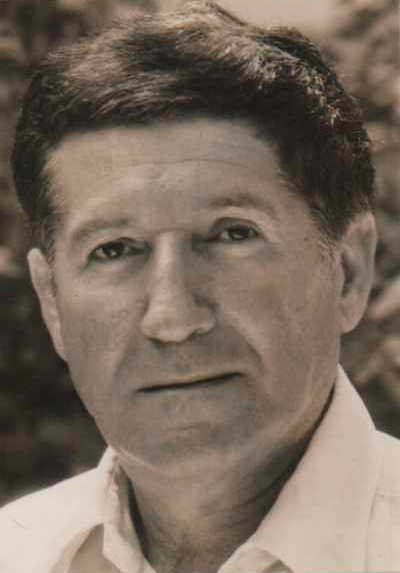
- Feder during his time in the Knesset

Faction represented in the Knesset
- 1977–1984: Alignment

Personal details
- Born: 4 January 1920; Olkusz, Poland
- Died: 11 November 2009 (aged 89)

Naftali Feder (Hebrew: נפתלי פדר; 4 January 1920 – 11 November 2009) was an Israeli politician who served as a member of the Knesset for the Alignment between 1977 and 1984.

== Biography ==
Feder was born in Olkusz in Poland. When the country was invaded by Nazi Germany, he fled to the Russian-occupied area and joined the Red Army. His family remained in the area and were subsequently killed in Auschwitz concentration camp. He fought in the Battle of Kiev, but was injured and later released from the army. After the war he returned to Poland, moving to Łódź, where he became a member of the Hashomer Hatzair leadership and edited its journal named Gesherim (Bridges), as well as running a home for children who had survived the Holocaust. After moving to Lindenfels to run another children's home, he emigrated to Israel in 1949, where he joined the Israel Defence Forces, fighting in the Battle of Tel Motila.

After working as a lorry driver in Haifa, Feder was elected secretary of Nesher Workers Council. He moved to Beersheba in 1957 to become the city council's treasurer under mayor David Tuviyahu. From 1963 to 1965 he worked in Brazil as a Jewish Agency emissary, before working as Mapam's secretary from 1968 until 1976. In 1977 he was elected to the Knesset on the Alignment list (an alliance of the Labor Party and Mapam). He was re-elected in 1981, but lost his seat in the 1984 elections. In 1984 he served as deputy speaker of the Knesset.

Feder also worked as a UNWRA director with responsibility for child refugees. He died in 2009 at the age of 89.
