= Pinhas Scheinman =

Israeli politician (1912–99)

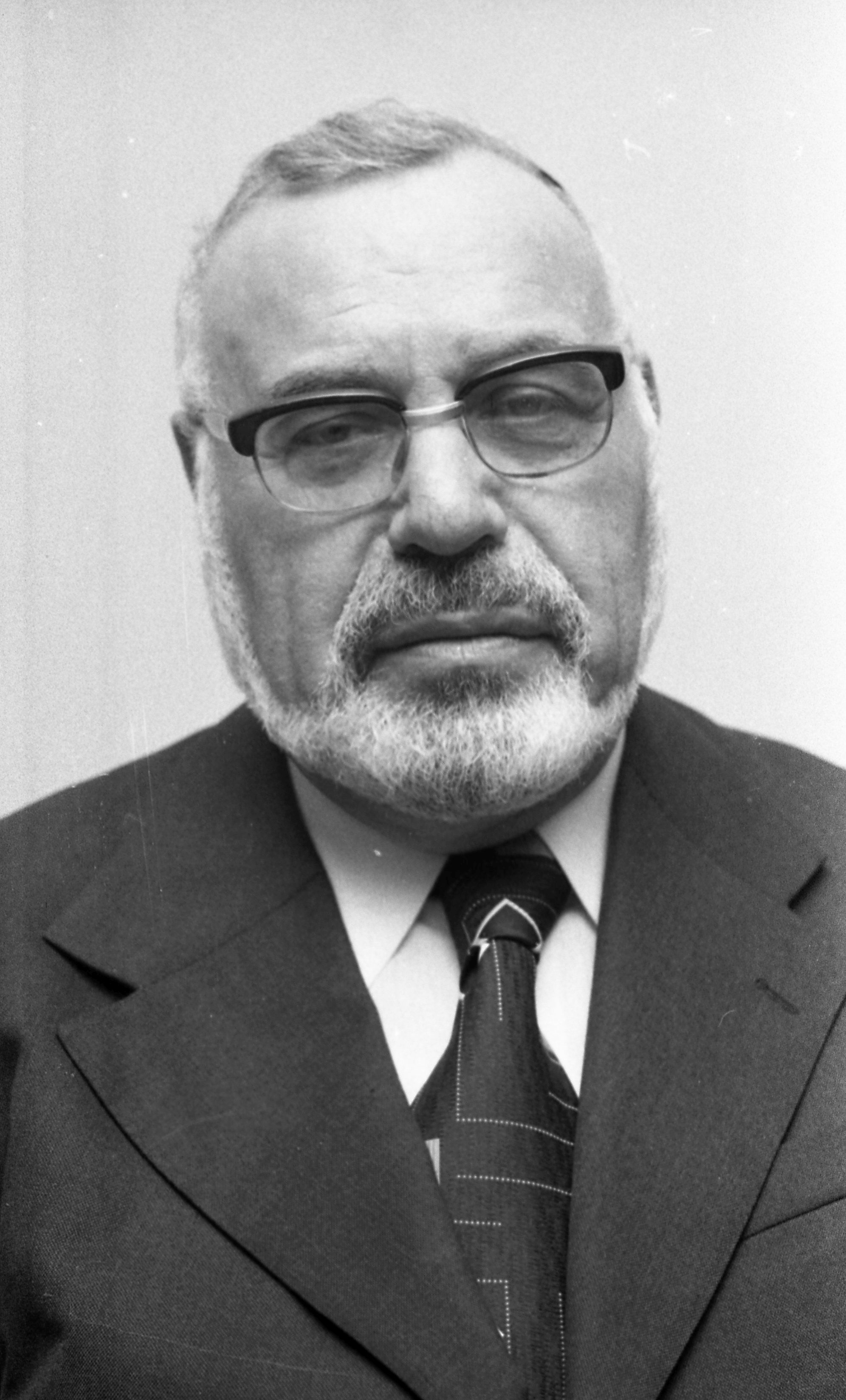
- Scheinman in 1977

Faction represented in the Knesset
- 1974–1981: National Religious Party

Personal details
- Born: 1 July 1912; Kraków, Austria-Hungary
- Died: 10 October 1999 (aged 87)

Pinhas Scheinman (Hebrew: פנחס שינמן; 1 July 1912 – 10 October 1999) was an Israeli politician who served as a member of the Knesset for the National Religious Party between 1974 and 1981.

== Biography ==
Born in Kraków in Austria-Hungary (today in Poland), Scheinman was educated at yeshivas and a high school, before attending business school. He was a member of the Young Mizrachi movement, later becoming its secretary general in Poland, and held the same position in the main Mizrachi movement. He also served on the board of the Torah VeAvoda movement in Warsaw.

In 1948 he emigrated to Israel, where he joined Hapoel HaMizrachi, becoming its secretary general. He headed the Tel Aviv-Yafo Religious Council and the Society of Religious Councils in Israel. He became chairman of the Tel Aviv branch of the National Religious Party (formed by a merger of Mizrachi and Hapoel HaMizrachi), and in 1973 was elected to the Knesset on the party's list. He was appointed a Deputy Speaker, and was re-elected in 1977, retaining his role as Deputy Speaker. However, he lost his seat in the 1981 elections.

He died in 1999 at the age of 87.
