= Avraham Katz =

Israeli politician

- אברהם כץ
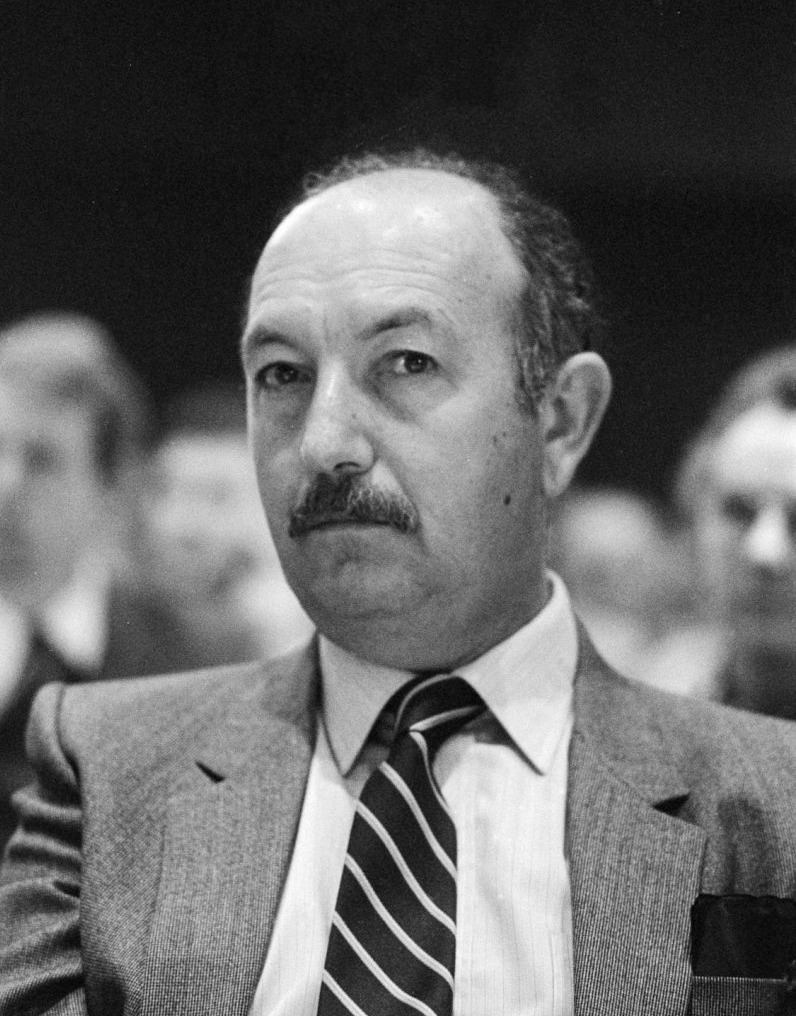
- Katz in 1982

Faction represented in the Knesset
- 1969–1974: Gahal
- 1974–1981: Likud

Personal details
- Born: 1931 Nes Ziona, Mandatory Palestine
- Died: 13 August 1986 (aged 54–55)

Avraham Katz (Hebrew: אברהם כץ; 1931 – 13 August 1986) was an Israeli politician who served as a member of the Knesset for Gahal and Likud between 1969 and 1981.

== Biography ==
Born in Ness Ziona during the Mandate era, Katz was educated at the Herzliya Hebrew High School. He joined the Palmach was a member of its Harel Brigade during the 1948 Arab-Israeli War. He went on to study literature, economics and geography at the Hebrew University of Jerusalem, gaining a BA and MA and certification as a high school teacher. Between 1950 and 1955 he was a member of the university's student council.

In 1955 he joined the General Zionists. He was also a member of the High School Teachers Association, serving as spokesman and a member of its directorate, and as its chairman between 1962 and 1969. Between 1968 and 1969 he worked as director of the Ministry of Education's School of Completion Studies for Senior Educators.

In 1969 Katz was elected to the Knesset on the Gahal list, an alliance of Herut and the Liberal Party (which the General Zionists had merged into in 1961). The following year he began lecturing in the geography department at Tel Aviv University, a post he held until 1977. He was re-elected in 1973, by which time Gahal had merged into Likud. He was re-elected again in 1977 and the following year became a member of the board of the Jewish Agency for Israel, also heading its Youth and Pioneering Department. He lost his seat in the 1981 elections.

He died in 1986.
