= Shlomo Eliahu =

Israeli politician

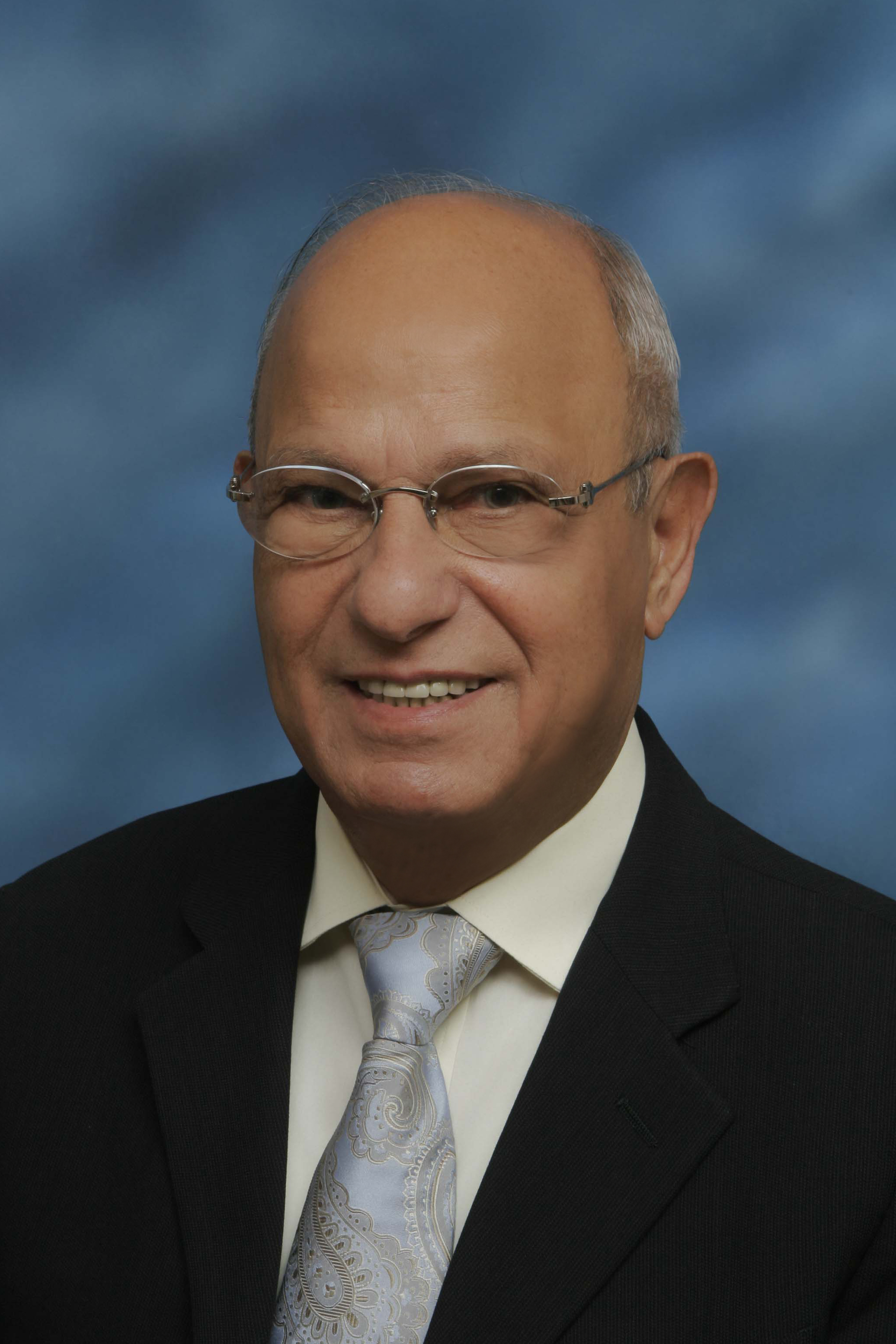

Faction represented in the Knesset
- 1978: Democratic Movement for Change
- 1978–1980: Democratic Movement
- 1980–1981: Ahva

Personal details
- Born: 18 January 1936 (age 90) Baghdad, Iraq

Shlomo Eliahu (Hebrew: שלמה אליהו; born 18 January 1936) is an Israeli businessman, billionaire, and former politician who served as a member of the Knesset between 1978 and 1981.

== Biography ==
Born in Baghdad in 1936, Eliahu emigrated to Israel in 1950 with his parents and eight siblings. After initially being based in a ma'abara at Beit Lid, his family moved to Kiryat Shalom.

Shortly after immigrating he started working for Migdal. After being sacked in 1953, he began working for Binyan as an insurance agent. He was exempted from national service in the IDF as he had suffered from polio, and in 1955 started an independent insurance company in the Shapira neighbourhood of Tel Aviv. In 1966 he established the Eliyahu insurance company, which initially dealt only with car insurance, before expanding to other forms of insurance.

In 1977 he joined the new Democratic Movement for Change (Dash) party, and won a place on its Knesset list. Although he failed to win a seat in the 1977 elections, he entered the Knesset on 15 February 1978 as a replacement for Meir Zorea. When the party split later in 1978, he joined the Democratic Movement.

On 8 July 1980 Eliahu and Shafik Assad left the Democratic Movement to establish Ahva. Although they were later joined by Akiva Nof, both Nof and Assad left the party by the end of the Knesset session, leaving Eliahu as its only member. The party did not run in the 1981 elections, and Eliyahu lost his seat.

Today Eliahu owns a large stake in Bank Leumi and 23% of the Union Bank of Israel. According to Forbes, in 2011 he was ranked as Israel's 12th richest person with a net worth of $1.1 billion (USD).

He is divorced with four children.
