= Moshe Amar =

Israeli politician (1922–2015)

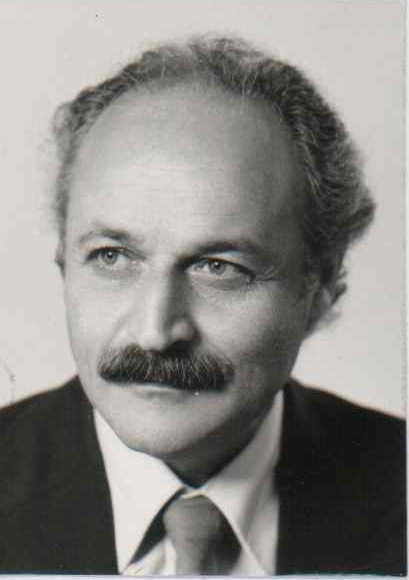
- Amar during his time in the Knesset

Faction represented in the Knesset
- 1977–1981: Alignment

Personal details
- Born: 21 May 1922; Safed, Mandatory Palestine
- Died: 30 November 2015 (aged 93)

Moshe Amar (Hebrew: משה עמאר; 21 May 1922 – 30 November 2015) was an Israeli politician who served as a member of the Knesset for the Alignment between 1977 and 1981.

== Biography ==
Born in Safed during the Mandate era, Amar studied at the Scottish College High School in Safed and then at the School for Jurisprudence, and was certified as a lawyer.

A member of the Hashomer Hatzair youth movement, he joined Mapam in 1951. He became secretary and chairman of the party's Haifa branch, and was a member of the party's secretariat and central committee. In 1977 he was elected to the Knesset on the Alignment list (an alliance of Mapam and the Labor Party), but lost his seat in the 1981 elections.
