= Shafik Assad =

Israeli Druze politician (1937-2004)

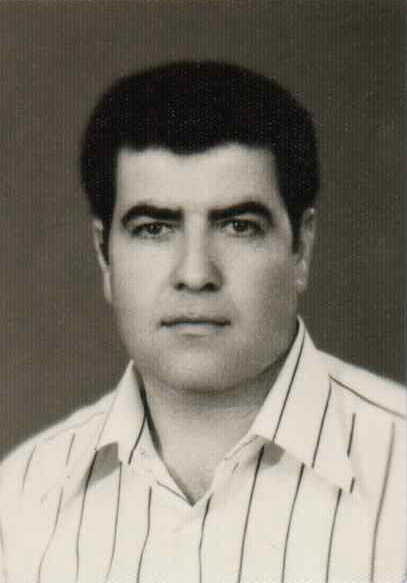

Faction represented in the Knesset
- 1977–1978: Democratic Movement for Change
- 1978–1980: Democratic Movement
- 1980–1981: Ahva
- 1981: Telem

Personal details
- Born: 10 April 1937 Beit Jann, Mandatory Palestine
- Died: 6 June 2004 (aged 67)

Shafik Assad (Arabic: شفيق اسعد, Hebrew: שפיק אסעד; 10 April 1937 – 6 June 2004) was an Israeli-Druze politician who served as a member of the Knesset for the Democratic Movement for Change, the Democratic Movement, Ahva and Telem between 1977 and 1981.

== Biography ==
Born in Beit Jann during the Mandate era, Assad attended high school in Rameh. He served as secretary of the Histadrut trade union in his hometown between 1961 and 1967, and headed the town's local council from 1969 until 1976.

He joined the new Democratic Movement for Change (Dash) party in the mid-1970s, and was elected to the Knesset on its list in 1977. On 14 September 1978 Assad was one of seven MKs to form the Democratic Movement after Dash split up. On 8 July 1980 he and Shlomo Eliyahu left the Democratic Movement to establish the Ahva faction. On 15 June 1981 he moved parties again, this time joining Telem, but lost his seat in the 30 June 1981 elections.

He died in 2004 at the age of 67.
