= Amal Nasser el-Din =

Israeli Druze politician and author (1928–2025)

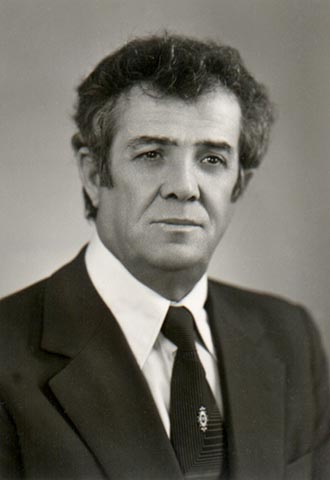
- El-Din during his time in the Knesset

Faction represented in the Knesset
- 1977–1988: Likud

Personal details
- Born: 31 July 1928 Daliyat al-Karmel, Mandatory Palestine
- Died: 9 February 2025 (aged 96)

Amal Nasser el-Din (Arabic: أمل نصر الدين; Hebrew: אמל נסראלדין; 31 July 1928 – 9 February 2025) was an Israeli Druze author and politician who served as a member of the Knesset for Likud between 1977 and 1988. In 2023 he was awarded the Israel Prize for Special contribution to Society and the State.

== Career ==
El-Din was born in Daliyat al-Karmel on 31 July 1928.

El-Din headed the section for demobilised soldiers from 1961 and 1964 and was founder and director of the Yad LeBanim memorial project. From 1964 until 1971 he served as secretary of the Daliyat al-Karmel and Isfiya Workers Council. In 1969 his son Lutfi was killed on the last day of his national service.

Originally a member of Mapai, he joined Herut in 1971. He was on the Likud list (an alliance of Herut and other right-wing parties) for the 1973 Knesset elections, but failed to win a seat. However, he entered the Knesset on 21 January 1977 as a replacement for Akiva Nof, who had resigned after leaving Likud. El-Din was re-elected in the May 1977 elections, and again in 1981 and 1984, before losing his seat in the 1988 elections.

In 1973 el-Din founded the Zionist Druze Circle, a group whose aim was to encourage the Druze to support the state of Israel fully and unreservedly. Regarding Druze belief and Jewish-Druze relations, he stated: "We believe in the same Bible as the Jews. We believe that Isaac, not Ishmael was brought for sacrifice. Mohammad is not our prophet. We are the descendants of Jethro, Moses' father-in-law."

In 2008 his grandson, also named Lutfi, was killed during Operation Cast Lead. In 2023 el-Din was awarded the Israel Prize for Special contribution to Society and the State. He died on 9 February 2025 at the age of 96.

== See also ==
- List of Israeli Druze
