= Moshe Meron =

Israeli lawyer and politician (1926–2023)

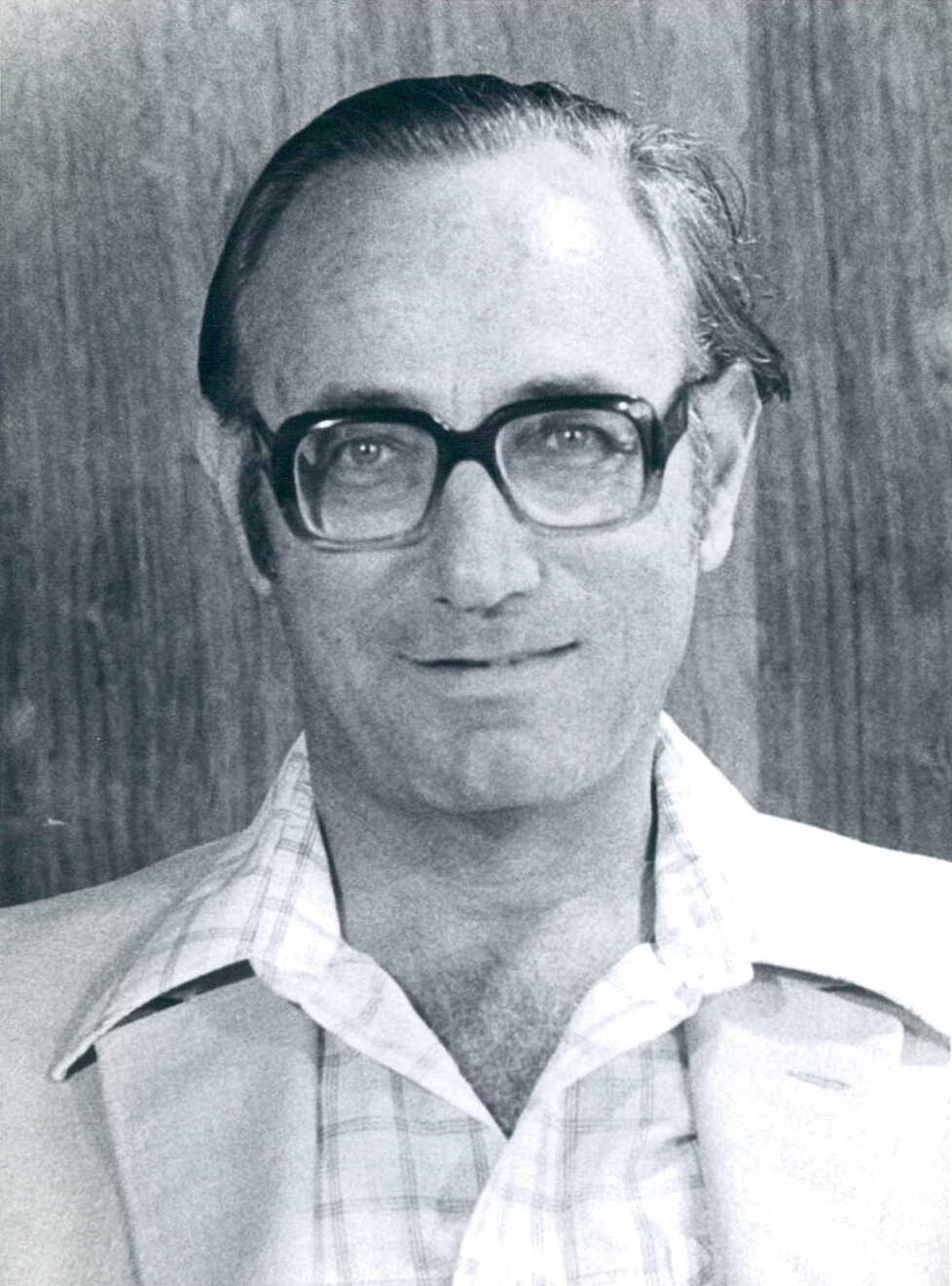

Faction represented in the Knesset
- 1977–1981: Likud

Personal details
- Born: 22 March 1926 Königsberg, Germany
- Died: 6 October 2023 (aged 97) Israel

Moshe Meron (Hebrew: משה מרון; 22 March 1926 – 6 October 2023) was an Israeli lawyer and politician who served as a member of the Knesset for Likud between 1977 and 1981.

== Biography ==
Born Max Ludwig Segall to Gustav Segall and Hanna Koenigsberger Segall in Königsberg in Germany (today Kaliningrad in Russia), Meron emigrated to Mandatory Palestine in 1936. He attended the Jerusalem School of Law and was certified as a lawyer. Between 1948 and 1949 he worked as a lawyer for the Israeli Air Force.

A member of Ramat Gan city council, he served as deputy mayor between 1969 and 1977. In 1977 he was elected to the Knesset on the Likud list. He was appointed Deputy Speaker and chaired the House Committee. He lost his seat in the 1981 elections, and returned to working as a lawyer, briefly serving as Ramat Gan's deputy mayor again in 1981. He was also a member of the board of directors of several companies and research institutions.

Meron died on 6 October 2023 at the age of 97.
