= David Glass (Israeli politician) =

Israeli politician (1936–2014)

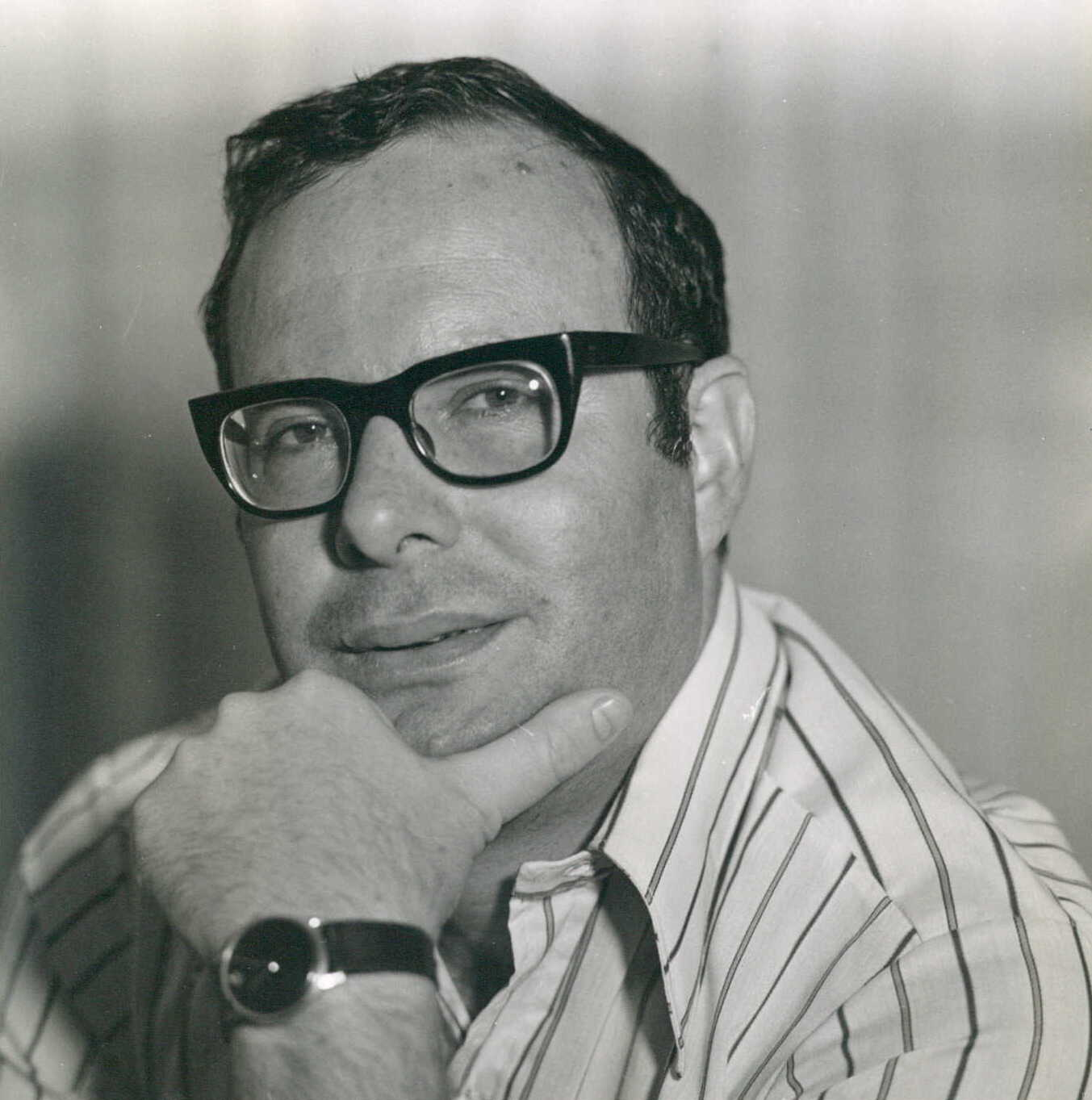

Faction represented in the Knesset
- 1977–1981: National Religious Party

Personal details
- Born: 16 October 1936; Balfouria, Mandatory Palestine
- Died: 16 August 2014 (aged 77); Jerusalem, Israel

David Glass (Hebrew: דוד גלס; 16 October 1936 – 16 August 2014) was an Israeli civil servant and politician who served as a member of the Knesset for the National Religious Party between 1977 and 1981.

== Biography ==
Born in Balfouria during the Mandate era, Glass was educated at a yeshiva high school before studying law at the Hebrew University of Jerusalem, where he was certified as a lawyer.

In 1956 he began working as an assistant to the director of the Religious Education Centre. In 1960 he became director of the Bureau of the Minister of Religious Affairs, before becoming director of the Department of Karaites and Samaritans in 1964. Between 1966 and 1969 he worked as an assistant to the Deputy Minister for Religious Affairs. From 1969 to 1971 he was Deputy Director for Special Functions in the Religious Affairs Ministry, before becoming the ministry's deputy director in 1971 and then director in 1974.

A member of the central committee of the National Religious Party and chairman of the party's Jerusalem branch, he was elected to the Knesset on the party's list in 1977. In his first term he chaired the Constitution, Law and Justice Committee. However, he lost his seat in the 1981 elections.

In 1984 he left the party due to its move to the right, and joined the Labor Party. He later joined Shas, becoming a senior figure in the party as lawyer and confidant for Ovadia Yosef. He had a moderating influence on the party, and was amongst the signatories of the Geneva Initiative.

Glass was married with two children and 8 grandchildren. He died on 16 August 2014 due to problems with his gall bladder.
