= Shmuel Toledano =

Israeli politician (1921–2022)

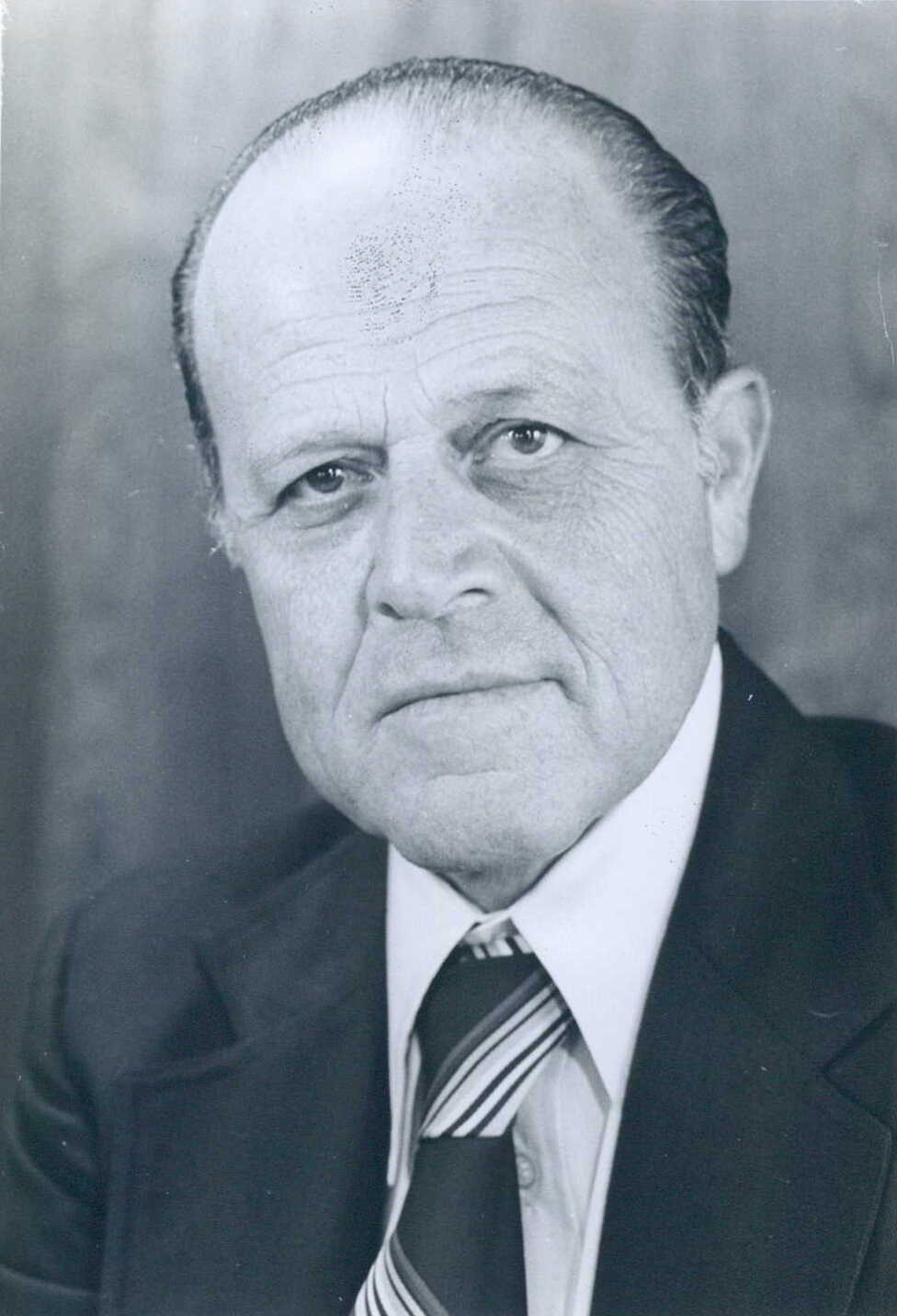
- Toledano during his time in the Knesset

Faction represented in the Knesset
- 1977–1978: Democratic Movement for Change
- 1978–1981: Shinui

Personal details
- Born: 16 January 1921 Tiberias, Mandatory Palestine
- Died: 30 December 2022 (aged 101) Jerusalem, Israel

Shmuel Toledano (Hebrew: שמואל טולידאנו; 16 January 1921 – 30 December 2022) was an Israeli Mossad employee and politician who served as a member of the Knesset for the Democratic Movement for Change and Shinui between 1977 and 1981.

== Biography ==
Born in Tiberias during the Mandate era, Toledano attended the Scottish College in Safed. He joined the Haganah and was imprisoned by the British authorities in Latrun. He served as an intelligence officer in the Israel Defense Forces during the 1948 Arab-Israeli War, commanding a unit tasked with open-source intelligence gathering from 1948 to 1951. He was discharged from the IDF in 1952 with the rank of Major. Between 1953 and 1976 he worked for Mossad and was one of the organisation's leaders.

Toledano joined Mapai in 1960 but left the party in 1977 to join the newly formed Democratic Movement for Change (Dash). He was elected to the Knesset on the party's list in 1977 and chaired the State Control Committee. When Dash split the following year, he became a member of Shinui. He lost his seat in the 1981 elections and in 1983 left Shinui to join Mapam. For his efforts for peace, he won the Mount Zion Award in 1999.

Toledano died on 30 December 2022 at the age of 101.
