= Underhang seat =

In proportional representation (PR) electoral systems, an underhang seat is a seat that becomes vacant because the party that was entitled to it by virtue of its share of the total votes cast was unable to fill it through having submitted too few candidates.

== Explanation ==
Under party-list proportional representation systems, parties receive a number of seats in proportion to the number of votes they received. If a party does not have enough people to fill its vacancies, there is an underhang. For example, if a party wins enough votes for ten seats, but only has seven people nominated on its list, then there is an underhang of three seats.

A way of dealing with underhangs is to allow the party to nominate additional people to become MPs. However, parties with underhangs usually are not entitled to retroactively add to their list, and lose the potential seats represented by the underhang. Parties aim to avoid the problem by having a substantially larger list than they would hope to win as seats.

== Examples ==
In the 1977 Israeli legislative election, Shmuel Flatto-Sharon's electoral list received enough votes for two seats in the Knesset, but since it had only one candidate - Flatto-Sharon himself - the second seat was reallocated to the Mafdal instead, increasing its seats from 11 to 12.

If New Zealand's 99 MP Party (whose stated manifesto was to reduce the size of parliament) had received five percent of the vote in the 2005 New Zealand general election, they would have been entitled to six seats within the 120-seat House of Representatives. But because they had just two people on their list, they would have filled only two seats. The House would thus have shrunk by four MPs. Since the party received only 0.03% of the vote, this eventuality was avoided.

The issue of an underhang returned at the 2023 New Zealand general election. Due to a missed deadline, Liz Gunn's New Zealand Loyal party only managed to register two candidates on their party list, meaning that if they had exceeded the five percent threshold required to enter parliament (without winning an electorate), it would have resulted in four empty seats in the resulting parliament. Much like the 99 MP party before them, they failed to be elected, receiving just 1.2% of the vote, far short of the required minimum.

In the Scottish Parliament an underhang seat was caused by the death of Margo MacDonald in 2014. As she was elected as a regional list MSP as an independent (effectively the sole candidate of "the Margo party") her seat was left vacant until the next election.

== See also ==
- Overhang seat
