= Elyakim Badian =

Israeli politician

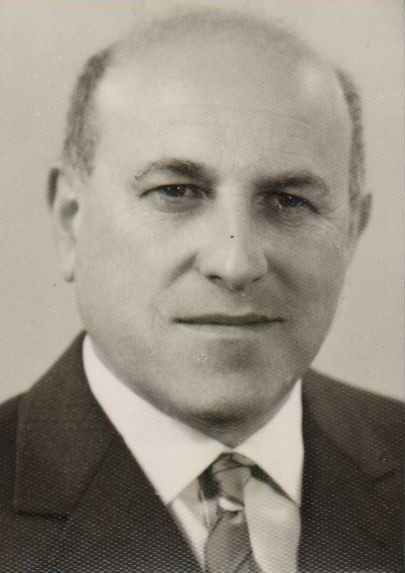
- Badian during his time in the Knesset

Faction represented in the Knesset
- 1977–1981: Likud

Personal details
- Born: 12 December 1925 Chernivtsi, Romania
- Died: 13 February 2000 (aged 74) Israel

Elyakim-Gustav Badian (Hebrew: אליקים-גוסטב בדיאן; 12 December 1925 – 13 February 2000) was an Israeli politician who served as a member of the Knesset for Likud between 1977 and 1981.

== Biography ==
Born in Chernivtsi in Romania (today in Ukraine), Badian became a member of the Romanian Zionist Movement. He attempted to immigrate to Mandatory Palestine, but was captured by the British authorities and sent to one of the Cyprus internment camps in 1947, where he became a member of the High Committee. In 1949 he was able to immigrate.

He studied engineering at the Technion, and was later awarded an MBA by Tel Aviv University. He worked as an engineer, and was national secretary of the Engineers Union from 1968 until 1972, and again from 1974 until 1977.

Having been a member of the leadership of the Dor Hadash faction in the General Zionists, Badian became a member of the Liberal Party when the General Zionists merged into it in 1961. He became a member of the party's board in 1964, and was elected to Haifa city council in 1965, serving until 1969, and again between 1972 and 1978. Prior to the 1977 Knesset elections he was placed thirtieth on the list of Likud, (an alliance of the Liberal Party, Herut and other right-wing parties), and was elected as the alliance won 43 seats. For the 1981 elections he was moved down to fifty-third place on the Likud list, and lost his seat.

He died in 2000 at the age of 74.
