= Yehezkel Flomin =

Israeli politician (1935–2019)

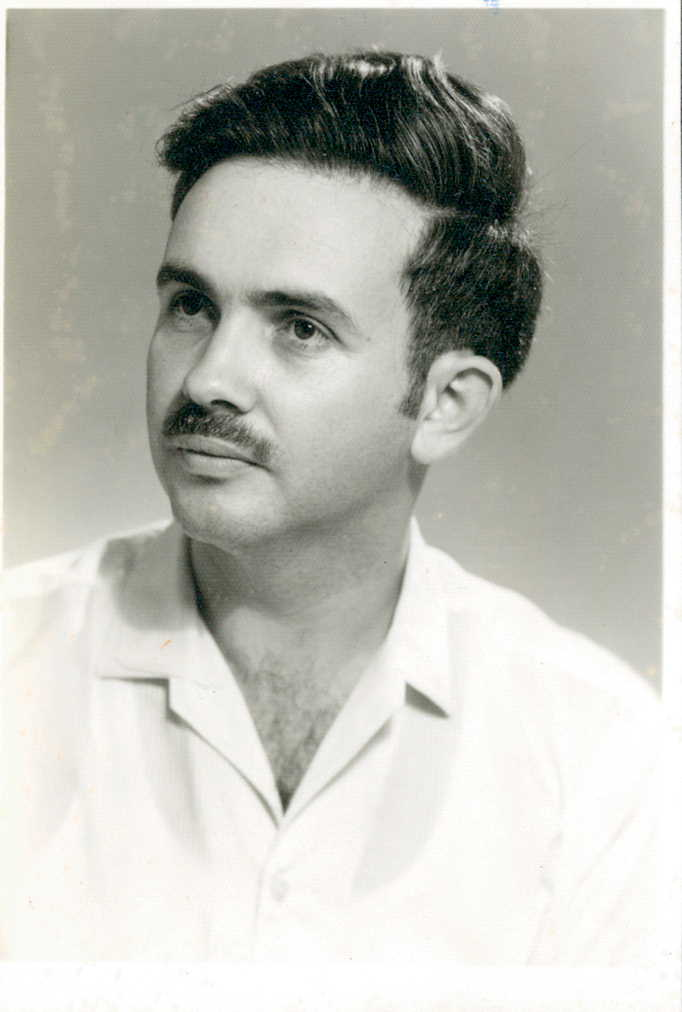
- Flomin during his time in the Knesset

Faction represented in the Knesset
- 1974–1981: Likud

Personal details
- Born: 2 August 1935 Jerusalem, Mandatory Palestine
- Died: 16 October 2019 (aged 84)

Yehezkel Flomin (Hebrew: יחזקאל פלומין; 2 August 1935 – 16 October 2019) was an Israeli politician who served as a member of the Knesset for Likud between 1974 and 1981.

== Biography ==
Born in Jerusalem during the Mandate era, Flomin attended the Balfour high school in Tel Aviv before studying law and economics at Tel Aviv University. He became a member of the university's faculty in 1962, working there until 1969. Between 1971 and 1972 he was a member of the Hebrew University of Jerusalem's faculty.

A member of the Liberal Party, Flomin chaired its youth leadership and was a member of the party's directorate. He was elected to the Knesset on the Likud list (an alliance of Herut, the Liberal Party and several other small right-wing parties) in 1973, taking his seat the following year. He was re-elected in 1977, and was appointed Deputy Minister of Finance on 28 June that year, holding the post until 30 July 1979.

He lost his seat in the 1981 elections, and in 1986 left the Liberal Party to establish the Liberal Centre Party.

Flomin died on 16 October 2019 at the age of 84.
