= Democratic Movement (Israel) =

Democratic Movement תנועה דמוקרטית
- Leader: Yigael Yadin
- Founded: 14 September 1978
- Dissolved: 10 March 1981
- Split from: Democratic Movement for Change
- Most MKs: 7 (1978–1980)
- Fewest MKs: 4 (1980–1981)

The Democratic Movement (Hebrew: תנועה דמוקרטית, Tnu'a Demokratit) was a short-lived political party in Israel formed in the aftermath of the spectacular breakup of Dash. Founded in 1978, it lasted only until 1981.

== Background ==
The party was formed on 14 September 1978 when Dash split into three new parties just sixteen months after having come third in the 1977 elections. Seven MKs, including Dash leader Yigael Yadin, founded the Democratic Movement, seven created Shinui (Change) and one set up Ya'ad.

Unlike Shinui, which pulled out, the new party remained part of Menachem Begin's coalition government, with Yadin as deputy Prime Minister and Shmuel Tamir as Minister of Justice.

However, like its predecessor, the Democratic Movement also broke up. In 1980 four MKs left the party; Mordechai Elgrably left on 5 February to sit as an independent MK (he later helped form the Unity Party), on 8 July Shafik Asaad and Shlomo Eliyahu left to form Ahva (which also split before the next elections), whilst Akiva Nof left on 17 September, also to join Ahva. The party was officially dissolved on 10 March 1981, with its remaining members, Tamir, Yadin and Binyamin Halevi, sitting out the remainder of the Knesset session as independents.

== List of Knesset members ==
Name	Years in office	Government roles	Other roles	Notes
Shafik Assad	1978–1980			Left party to join Ahva
Shlomo Eliyahu	1978–1980			Left party to join Ahva
Mordechai Elgrably	1978–1980			Left party to sit as an independent
Binyamin Halevi	1978–1981			
Akiva Nof	1978–1980			Left party to join Ahva
Shmuel Tamir	1978–1981	Minister of Justice		
Yigael Yadin	1978–1981	Deputy Prime Minister	Party leader	
