= Zeidan Atashi =

Israeli Druze politician

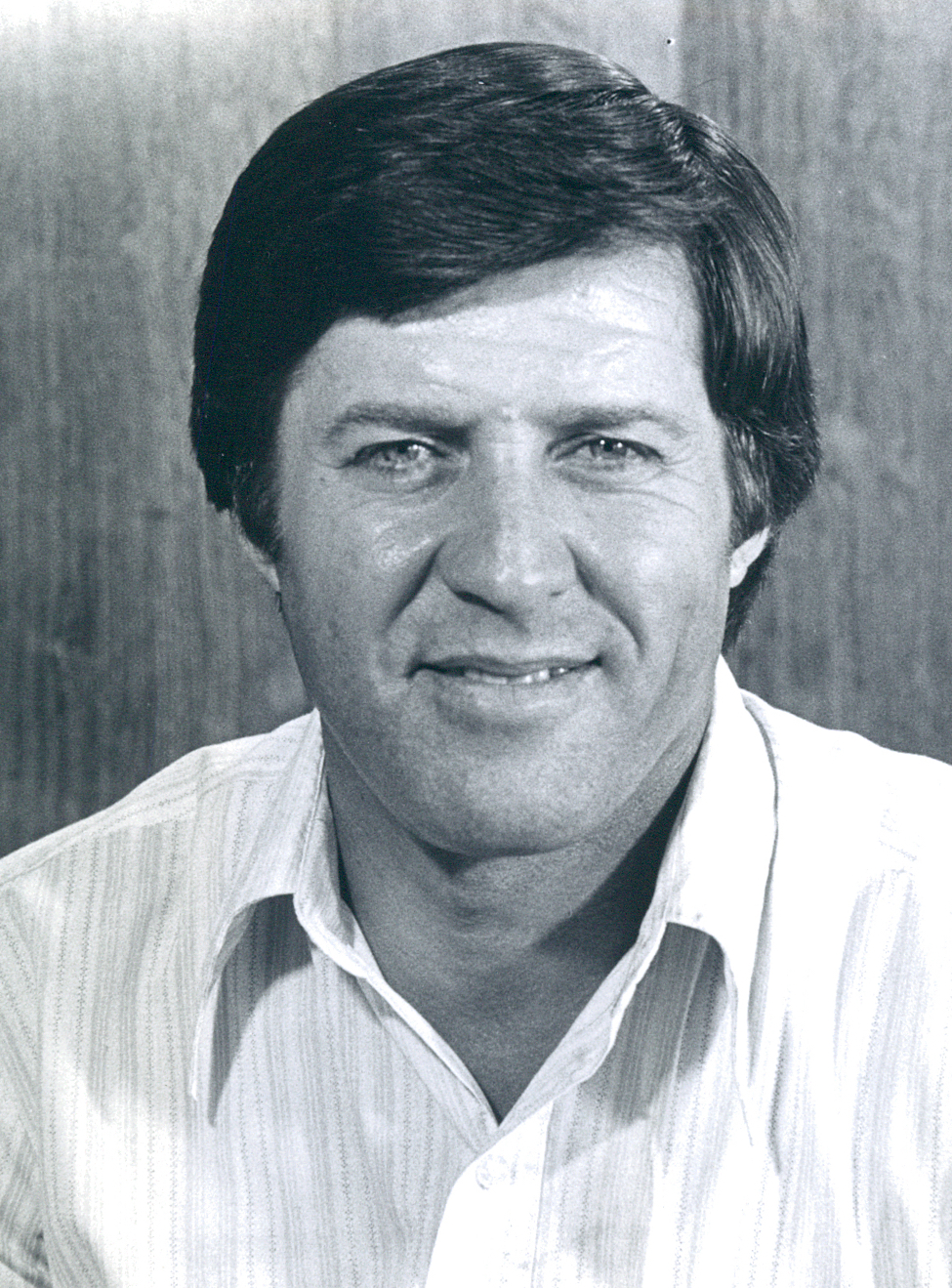
- Atashi during his time in the Knesset

Faction represented in the Knesset
- 1977–1978: Democratic Movement for Change
- 1978–1981: Shinui
- 1984–1988: Shinui

Personal details
- Born: 10 May 1940 (age 86) Isfiya, Mandatory Palestine

Zeidan Atashi (Arabic: زيدان عطشي, Hebrew: זיידאן עטשי; born 10 May 1940) is an Israeli Druze former diplomat and politician who served as a member of the Knesset for the Democratic Movement for Change and Shinui between 1977 and 1981, and again from 1984 until 1988.

== Biography ==
Born in Isfiya during the Mandate era, Atashi studied Arabic language and political science for a BA at the University of Haifa, before gaining an MA in political science at the Hebrew University of Jerusalem.

He worked for the Ministry of Foreign Affairs, and was the country's consul-general in New York City between 1972 and 1976.

In 1977 he joined the new Democratic Movement for Change (Dash), and was elected to the Knesset on the party's list in the 1977 elections. When Dash split the following year, he joined Shinui. He lost his seat in the 1981 elections, but returned to the Knesset after the 1984 elections. He lost his seat again in 1988.

Atashi was amongst the founders and chairman of the Druze Follow-Up Committee.

He is the author of Druze and Jews in Israel – A Shared Destiny?
