= Mahapach =

Israeli rightward political shift

Mahapach (Hebrew: מהפך, lit. 'revolution' or 'upheaval') refers to the political shift in Israel following the victory of Likud under Menachem Begin in the 1977 Israeli legislative election. The Mahapach ended the dominant party status of the Israeli Labor Party.

== History ==
Begin had been a long-time rival of Labor and its leader, David Ben-Gurion, the first Prime Minister of Israel. This has been claimed to have resulted in Israeli society becoming more religious and traditionalistic, with Haredi Judaism and Religious Zionism playing a bigger role. It also gave rise to the political mobilization of the Mizrahi Jews, who had migrated from the rest of the Middle East following Jewish exodus from Arab and Muslim countries after the 1947–1949 Palestine war, which gave rise to Israeli independence.

== See also ==
- Politics in Israel
