= Mordechai Elgrably =

Israeli politician

- מרדכי אלגרבלי
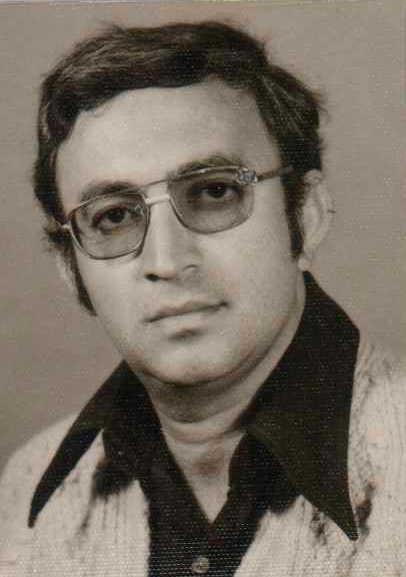
- Elgrably during his time in the Knesset

Faction represented in the Knesset
- 1977–1978: Democratic Movement for Change
- 1978–1980: Democratic Movement
- 1980–1981: Independent
- 1981: Unity Party

Personal details
- Born: 14 July 1944 (age 81) Meknes, Morocco

Mordechai Elgrably (Hebrew: מרדכי אלגרבלי; born 14 July 1944) is an Israeli former politician who served as a member of the Knesset for several parties between 1977 and 1981.

== Biography ==
Born in Meknes in Morocco, Elgrably received a religious education and was a member of the scout movement. He emigrated to Israel in 1964 and studied economics and mathematics at the Hebrew University of Jerusalem, gaining an MA.

He became chairman of the Oded movement in 1969 and worked as Deputy Director of Planning in the Ministry of Education and Culture between 1971 and 1977.

In 1977 he joined the new Democratic Movement for Change (Dash) party and was elected to the Knesset on its list in the elections that year. When the party split in 1978 he joined the Democratic Movement faction, but on 5 February 1980 left to sit as an independent. On 19 May the following year he joined Saadia Marciano's Equality in Israel - Panthers faction, which was renamed the Unity Party. He lost his seat in the June 1981 elections when the party failed to cross the electoral threshold.
