= Assaf Yaguri =

Israeli soldier and politician

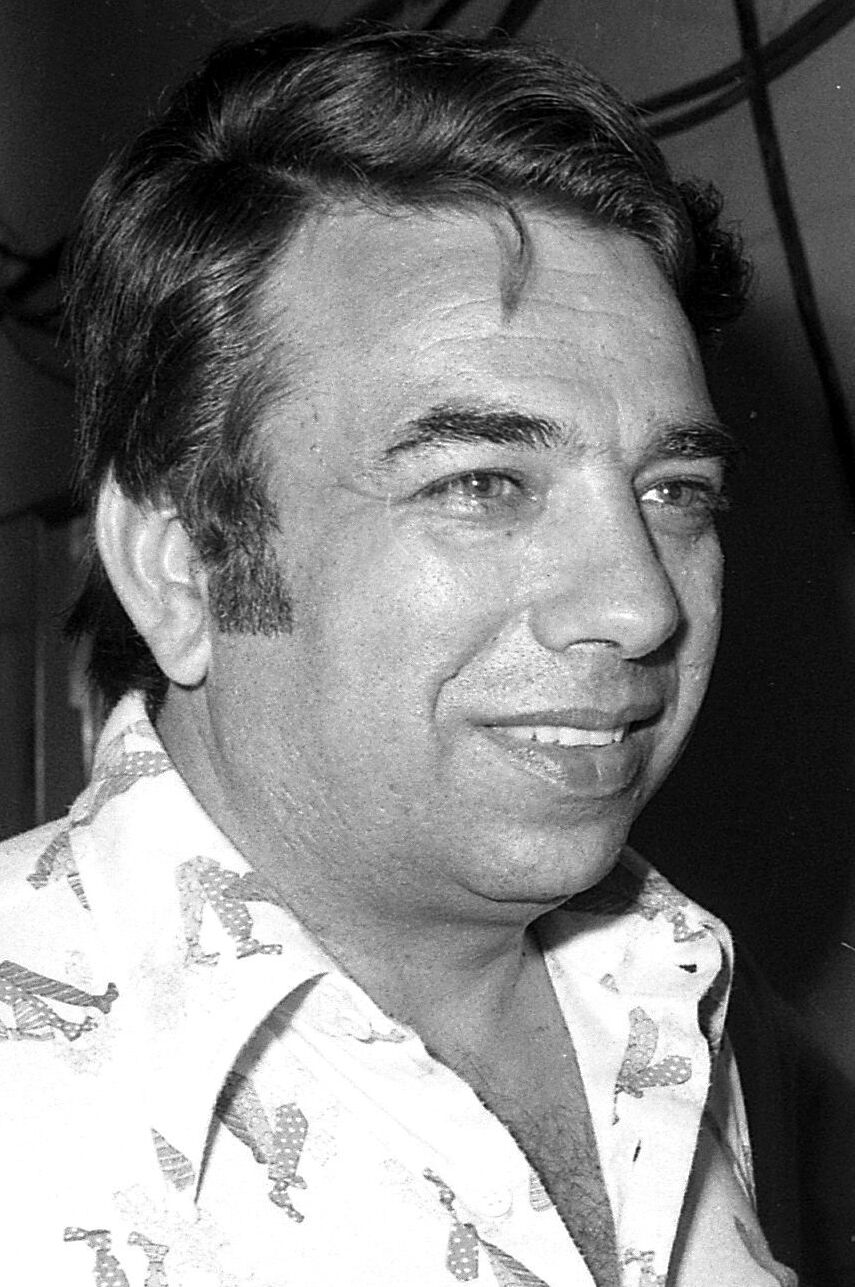
- Yaguri in 1977

Faction represented in the Knesset
- 1977–1978: Democratic Movement for Change
- 1978–1981: Ya'ad

Personal details
- Born: 13 February 1931; Yagur, Mandatory Palestine
- Died: 18 March 2000 (aged 69)

Assaf Yaguri (Hebrew: אסף יגורי; 13 February 1931 – 18 March 2000) was an Israeli soldier and politician who served as a member of the Knesset for the Democratic Movement for Change and Ya'ad between 1977 and 1981.

== Biography ==
Yaguri was born in Yagur during the Mandate era to Noah Yaguri (originally Prower) and Ada Rosenzweig, who were among the founding members of Yagur afrer immigrating from present-day Ukraine to Palestine in 1914 and 1924, respectively. Yaguri was a member of the central committee of the HaNoar HaOved youth movement, and was also a member of the Kibbutz HaMeuhad youth section. He became treasurer of Yagur, and joined the civil service, eventually becoming responsible for trade in the Israel Port Authority. He went on to become director of Tourist Development in southern Sinai and was director of the Neve Midbar Caravan in Sharm el-Sheikh and the Village Vacations Company. During the Yom Kippur War he commanded a tank battalion in Sinai, and was captured by the Egyptian Army. He was released after 46 days in a prisoner exchange.

In 1977 he joined the new Democratic Movement for Change and was elected to the Knesset on the party's list in the elections later that year. When the party split the following year he created a new single-man faction, Ya'ad. He lost his seat in the 1981 elections as Ya'ad won only 1,228 votes.

He died in 2000 at the age of 69.
