= Akiva Nof =

Israeli politician

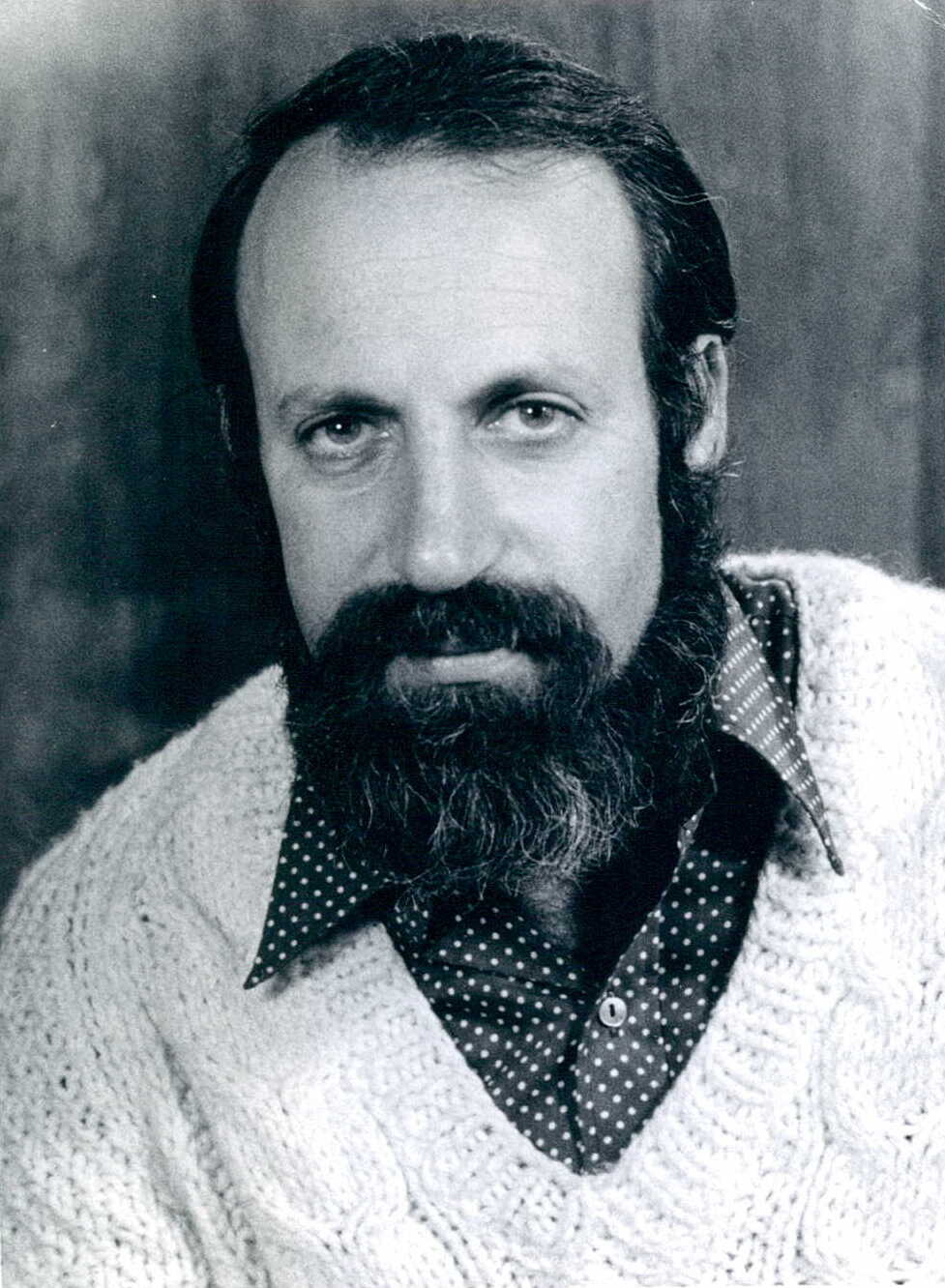

Faction represented in the Knesset
- 1974–1976: Likud
- 1976–1977: Free Centre
- 1977–1978: Democratic Movement for Change
- 1978–1980: Democratic Movement
- 1980–1981: Ahva
- 1981–1984: Likud

Personal details
- Born: 2 December 1936 (age 88); Tel Aviv, Mandatory Palestine

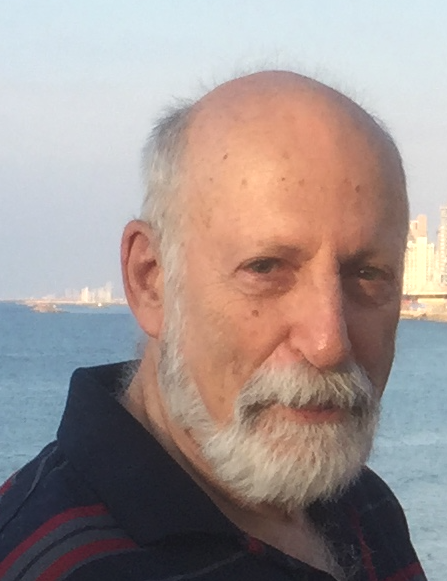
Nof in November 2017

Akiva Nof (Hebrew: עקיבא נוף; born 2 December 1936) is an Israeli poet and songwriter, composer, politician, lawyer and a journalist, who served three terms as a member of the Knesset between 1974 and 1984.

== Biography ==
Nof was born Akiva Naparstek' in Tel Aviv during the Mandate era. He studied international relations, Middle Eastern studies and law at the Hebrew University of Jerusalem. He was certified as a lawyer, and also studied at the Institute of Social Studies in The Hague.

In 2022 Mr. Nof was awarded the honorable title of Tel Aviv Freedom of the City

Nof is married to Ruth. He has three children.

=== Political career ===
Having joined Herut, he became chairman of the party's youth leadership. In 1965 he left the party to establish the Free Centre, serving as its secretary and organisational co-ordinator between 1967 and 1969. He was elected to the Knesset on the Likud list (an alliance of Herut, the Liberal Party, the Free Centre, the National List and the Movement for Greater Israel) in 1973. On 26 October 1976 he and Shmuel Tamir left Likud to establish the Free Centre as an independent faction. Both resigned from the Knesset on 22 January 1977, with Nof being replaced by Amal Nasser el-Din.

Having joined the new Democratic Movement for Change in 1977, Nof returned to the Knesset following the May 1977 elections. When the party split in 1978 he joined the Democratic Movement, before defecting to Ahva on 17 September 1980. On 28 January the following year he returned to Likud, and was re-elected on its list in the elections later that year. He lost his seat in the 1984 elections.

During his three terms in the Knesset, Nof served, among other duties, as the chairman of the forming committee for the "Israeli Law Courts" bill. He was prominent in legislative initiatives regarding social issues such as retirees' fair pay, gender equality regarding children's custody of divorced couples, smoking prohibition in public spaces, correction of taxation inconsistencies, prevention of marriage of minors, as well as prevention of corruption in public enterprises. He also served as a member of public boards of directors, such as the Seniors' Services Association, the Bible Museum, Independence House and the Haifa Symphony. Nof also served as an internal adjudicator at the Histadrut, at the Legal Bar Association and at the Composers and Writers Association. By filing lawsuits, Nof instigated some principle-setting court rulings, such as mandatory provision for handicap access to entertainment venues, prohibition of political censorship of works of art broadcast on radio and television.

Member of Knesset Nof, together with MK Shulamit Aloni and MK Yossi Sarid, tabled a bill proposing to de-criminalize male sodomy.

=== Music and writing ===
Nof composed and wrote popular songs and hits for leading performers including HaGashash HaHiver. His song Izevel (about Jezebel) was a number one hit in 1972. As a student in the Netherlands in the 1960s, while working as a freelance reporter for Kol Israel, Nof interviewed John Lennon and Yoko Ono during their Bed-In. At the end of the interview, Lennon sang a verse from Nof's song Oath for Jerusalem, which Nof transcribed for him into Latin characters.

Nof has published two poetry and song books titled Longing For The Past, and Pleasure Comes For Ever.
