= Unity Party (Israel) =

Unity Party מפלגת האיחוד
- Leader: Saadia Marciano
- Founded: 1980
- Split from: Left Camp of Israel; Democratic Movement
- Ideology: Mizrahi interests
- Colours: Blue
- Most MKs: 2 (1977)

Election symbol
- זה

The Unity Party (Hebrew: מפלגת האיחוד, Mifleget HaIhud), officially the Unity Party for the Advancement and Education of the Society in Israel (Hebrew: מפלגת האיחוד לקידום ולחינוך החברה בישראל, Mifleget HaIhud LeKidum VeLeHinukh HaHevra BeYisrael) and originally known as Equality in Israel – Panthers (Hebrew: שוויון בישראל - פנתרים, Shivion BeYisrael – Panterim) was a short-lived political party in Israel.

== Background ==
The party was formed on 11 November 1980 by Saadia Marciano. He had been elected to the Knesset on the list of the Left Camp of Israel, a union of various left-wing groups, including Meri, Moked, the Independent Socialist Faction and the Israeli Black Panthers, but broke away soon after taking his seat in 1980 (the Left Camp had two seats which were held in rotation by five party members). On 30 December, the faction was named Equality in Israel – Panthers.

In May 1981 he was joined by Mordechai Elgrably, who had been elected to the Knesset on Dash's list, and had joined the Democratic Movement after the party split, before leaving to sit as an independent MK. A name change resulted in the party becoming known as the Unity Party.

However, the party failed to cross the 1% electoral threshold in the June 1981 elections and subsequently disappeared.

== Knesset members ==
| Knesset (MKs) | Knesset Members |
|---|---|
| 9th (1 +1) | Saadia Marciano + Mordechai Elgrably (formerly independent) |
