= Ahva (political party) =

Ahva אחווה
- Founded: 8 July 1980
- Dissolved: 1981
- Split from: Democratic Movement
- Most MKs: 3 (1980–1981)
- Fewest MKs: 1 (1981)

Ahva (Hebrew: אחווה, Brotherhood) was a short-lived political party in Israel, one of several spinoffs created by the collapse of Dash.

== Background ==
Ahva was formed on 8 July 1980 when two MKs (Shafik Asaad and Shlomo Eliyahu) broke away from the Democratic Movement, itself a relatively new party, having been formed in 1978 when Dash split up (also creating Shinui and Ya'ad). On 17 September they were joined by Akiva Nof, also from the Democratic Movement.

However, like its two immediate predecessors, Ahva also suffered from instability. Nof defected to Likud on 28 January 1981, whilst Asaad left the party to join Telem (another newly formed party) on 15 June. By the end of the Knesset session in June 1981, only Eliayhu remained in the party (though it had outlasted the Democratic Movement, which folded in March 1981).

The party did not run in the 1981 elections and subsequently disappeared.
