= Development and Peace (political party) =

Development and Peace פיתוח ושלום
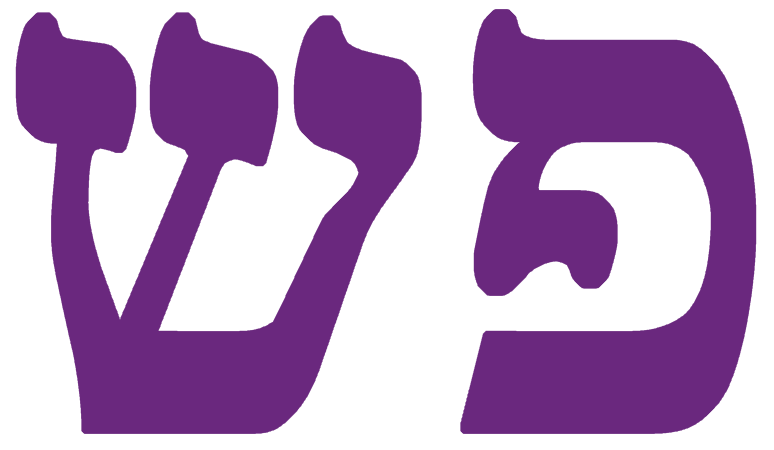
- Leader: Shmuel Flatto-Sharon
- Founded: 1970s
- Dissolved: 1980s
- Ideology: Right-wing populism
- Political position: Right-wing
- Most MKs: 1 (1977–1981)
- Fewest MKs: 1 (1977–1981)

Election symbol
- פש

Development and Peace (Hebrew: פיתוח ושלום, Pituah VeShalom), originally known as Flatto-Sharon (Hebrew: פלאטו שרון) was a right wing one-man political party in Israel.

== Background ==
The party was founded after Shmuel Flatto-Sharon had fled to Israel from France in 1976 after being charged with embezzling $60 million. In order to prevent his extradition, which France had requested, and despite hardly speaking Hebrew, he decided to run in the 1977 Knesset elections, hoping to gain parliamentary immunity.

Named after himself, Flatto-Sharon's party ran on right-wing populism (he was a supporter of the Gush Emunim settlement movement) and promises to provide apartments to young voters.

The new party won 2% of the vote, enough for two seats. However, as it was a one-man list, only one seat was taken. It has been suggested that the surprising level of support that the party won was a response to France's refusal to extradite Abu Daoud, who was wanted in Israel for the murder of 11 Israeli Olympic athletes in Munich. Once ensconced in the Knesset, Flatto-Sharon joined Menachem Begin's coalition, with one of his first acts being to vote in favour of a law that prohibited the extradition of Israeli citizens.

Later during the Knesset session he renamed the party Development and Peace and also helped in negotiations to free Israeli POWs. However, after serving for two years, Flatto-Sharon was convicted of vote buying, sentenced to nine months in prison and suspended from the Knesset. After several appeals, he was finally jailed for three months in 1984.

The party ran in the 1981 and 1984 elections, but did not pass the electoral threshold of 1% in either, and subsequently disappeared. Flatto-Sharon was never extradited to France to serve the five-year sentence given to him in his absence, as the five-year statute of limitations had expired. He was an established businessman and billionaire until his death in 2018.
