= Yigael Yadin =

Israeli archeologist, soldier and politician (1917-1984)

- יִגָּאֵל יָדִין
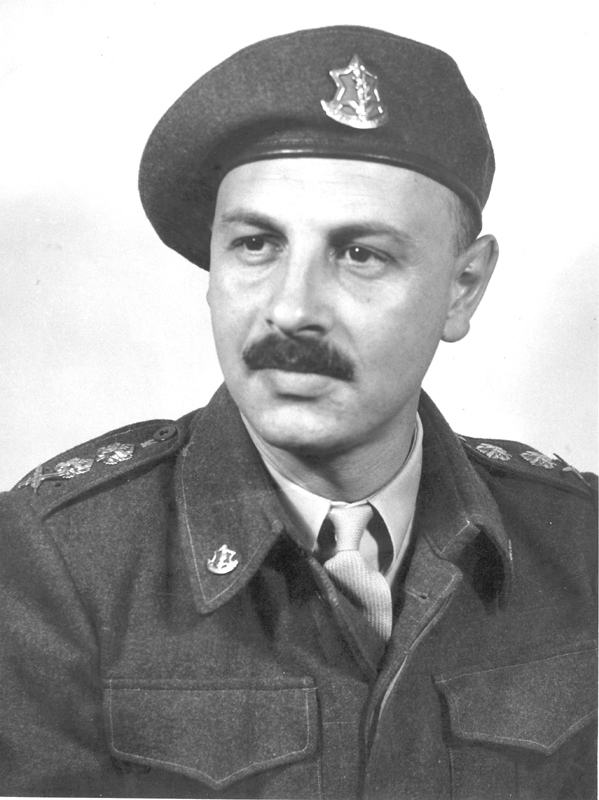

Ministerial roles
- 1977–1981: Deputy Prime Minister

Faction represented in the Knesset
- 1977–1978: Democratic Movement for Change
- 1978–1981: Democratic Movement
- 1981: Independent

Military roles
- 1949–1952: Chief of the General Staff

Personal details
- Born: Yigael Sukenik, יגאל סוקניק; 20 March 1917 Jerusalem, Mutasarrifate of Jerusalem, Ottoman Empire
- Died: 28 June 1984 (aged 67) Hadera, Israel

Military service
- Allegiance: Haganah; Israel Defense Forces
- Years of service: 1932–52
- Rank: Rav Aluf (highest rank): Chief of Staff
- Battles/wars: 1936–1939 Arab revolt in Palestine; World War II; 1947–1949 Palestine war

Yigael Yadin (Hebrew: יִגָּאֵל יָדִין [jigaˈel jaˈdin]; 20 March 1917 – 28 June 1984) was an Israeli archeologist, soldier and politician. He was the second Chief of Staff of the Israel Defense Forces and Deputy Prime Minister from 1977 to 1981.

== Biography ==
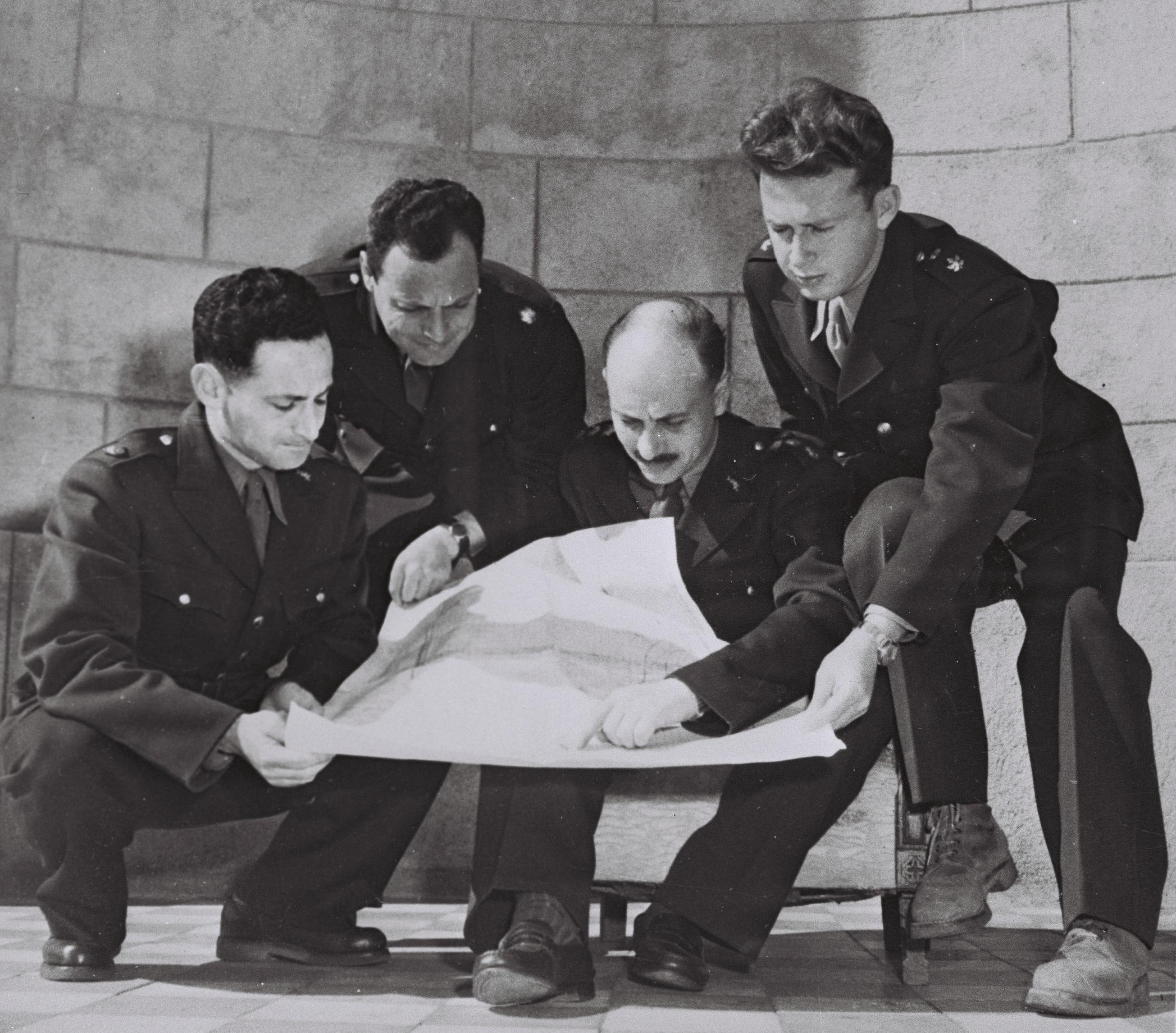
The Israeli delegation to the 1949 Armistice Agreements talks. Left to right: Commanders Yehoshafat Harkabi, Aryeh Simon, Yigael Yadin, and Yitzhak Rabin (1949)

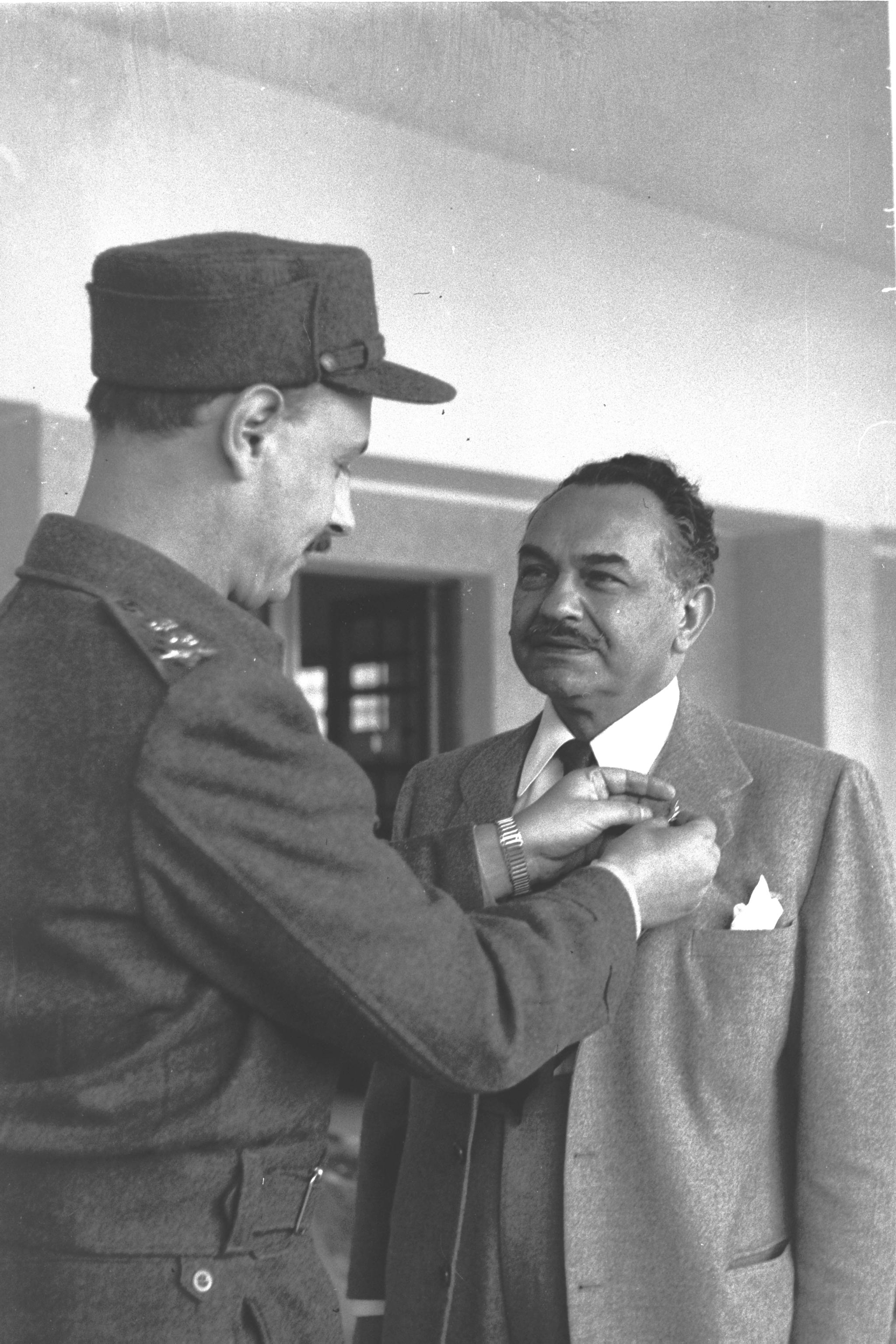
IDF Chief of Staff Yigael Yadin presenting a decoration to actor Edward G. Robinson (1950)

Yigael Sukenik (later Yadin) was born in Jerusalem, then part of Ottoman Palestine, to Polish-Jewish archaeologist Eleazar Sukenik and his wife Hasya Sukenik-Feinsold, a teacher and women's rights activist.

== Military career ==
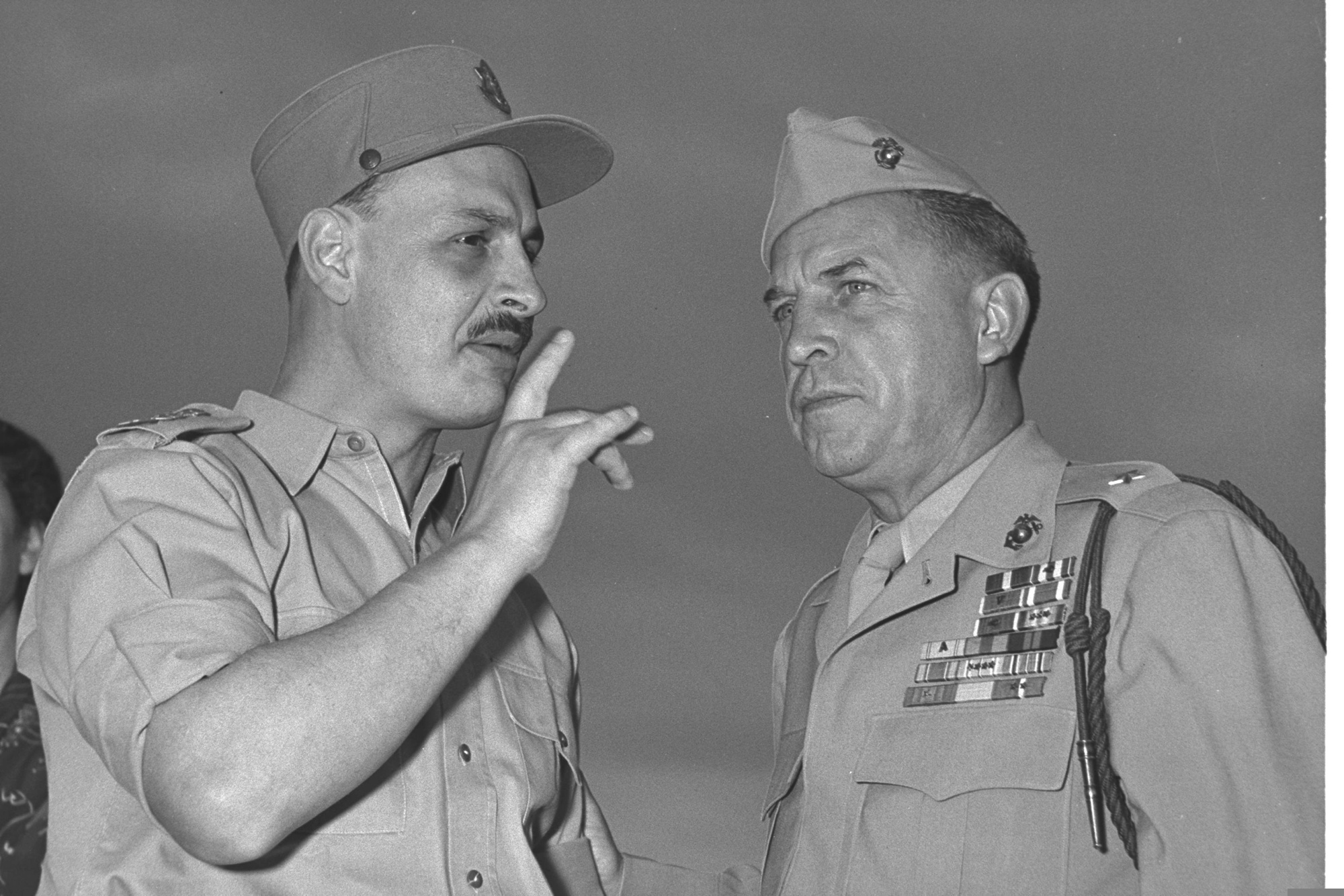
Yigal Yadin with General Riley, UN Chief of Staff, Middle East Area, Jerusalem

He joined the Haganah at age 15, and served in a variety of different capacities. In 1946, he left the Haganah following an argument with its commander Yitzhak Sadeh over the inclusion of a machine gun as part of standard squad equipment.

In 1948, shortly before the State of Israel declared its independence, Yadin interrupted his university studies to return to active service. He served as Israel's Head of Operations during the 1948 Arab–Israeli War, and was responsible for many of the key decisions made during the course of that war. In April, likely under the authorization of Ben-Gurion, he oversaw the secret biological warfare operation, Cast Thy Bread, in a campaign designed to poison the wells of Palestinian villages with bacteria, and prevent the return of the evicted. In June 1948 he threatened to resign during the Generals' Revolt during which he accused Ben-Gurion of attempting "to transform the army as a whole into an army of one political party (Mapai)".

Yadin was appointed Chief of Staff of the IDF on 9 November 1949, following the resignation of Yaakov Dori, and served in that capacity for three years. He resigned on 7 December 1952, over disagreements with then prime minister and defense minister David Ben-Gurion about cuts to the military budget, which he argued should be at least one third of the national budget. By age thirty-five, he had completed his military career.

== Archaeology career ==
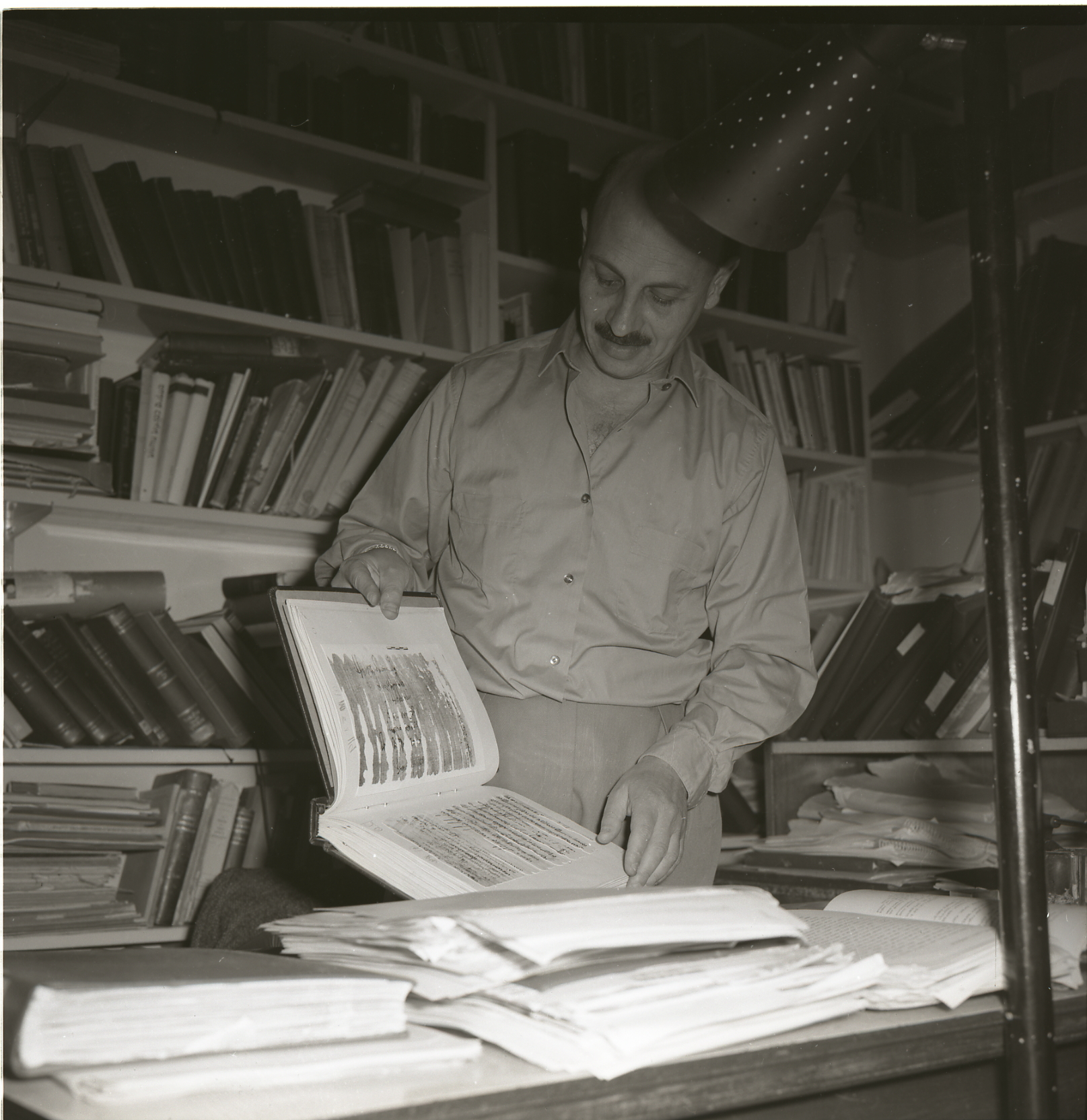
Yadin in 1963, photo by Boris Carmi.

Upon leaving the military, he devoted himself to research and began his life's work in archaeology. In 1956 he received the Israel Prize in Jewish studies, for his doctoral thesis on the translation of the Dead Sea Scrolls. His father had bought three of the seven scrolls discovered in 1947 by a Bedouin goat-herd, and he had bought the other four in New York in 1954.

As an archeologist, he excavated some of the most important sites in the region, including the Qumran Caves, Masada, Hazor, Tel Megiddo and caves in the Judean Desert where artifacts from the Bar Kokhba revolt were found. In 1960 he initiated scholarly archeological exploration of caves south of Ein Gedi, an enterprise approved by Ben-Gurion in which Israel Defense Forces rendered considerable support. He wrote about the expedition and its findings in his 1971 book Bar-Kokhba: The Rediscovery of the Legendary Hero of the Second Jewish Revolt against Rome. Yadin considered the Solomonic Gate at Tel Gezer to be the highpoint of his career. He was sometimes forced to deal with the theft of important artifacts, occasionally by prominent political and military figures. In one instance, where the thefts were commonly attributed to the famous one-eyed general Moshe Dayan, he remarked: "I know who did it, and I am not going to say who it is, but if I catch him, I'll poke out his other eye, too."

Even as an archaeologist, Yadin never completely abandoned public life. On the eve of the Six-Day War, he served as a military adviser to prime minister Levi Eshkol, and following the Yom Kippur War, he was a member of the Agranat Commission that investigated the actions that led to the war.

== Political career ==
In 1976 Yadin formed the Democratic Movement for Change, commonly known by its Hebrew acronym Dash, together with Professor Amnon Rubinstein, Shmuel Tamir, Meir Amit, Meir Zorea, and many other prominent public figures. The new party seemed to be an ideal solution for many Israelis who were fed up with alleged corruption in the Labor Alignment (the dominant party in Israel from its founding and up to that time), which included the Yadlin affair, the suicide of Housing Minister Avraham Ofer, and Leah Rabin's illegal dollar-denominated account in the United States. Furthermore, Dash was a response to the increasing sense of frustration and despair in the aftermath of the 1973 war, and the social and political developments that followed in its wake. Many people regarded Yadin, a warrior and a scholar, as the quintessential prototype of the ideal Israeli, untainted by corruption, who could lead the country on a new path.

In the 1977 elections, which transformed the Israeli political landscape, the new party did remarkably well for its first attempt to enter the Knesset, winning 15 of the 120 seats. As a result of the election, Likud party leader Menachem Begin was initially able to form a coalition without Dash (or parties to its left), significantly lowering the bargaining power of Dash. Dash joined the coalition after a few months. As the new Deputy Prime Minister, Yadin played a pivotal role in many events that took place, particularly the contacts with Egypt, which eventually led to the signing of the Camp David Accords and the peace treaty between Israel and its neighbor. Nevertheless, Dash itself proved to be a failure, and the party broke up into numerous splinter factions; Yadin joined the Democratic Movement, but it too split up and he sat as an independent MK for the remainder of his term. During a cabinet meeting, May 1981, while still Deputy Prime Minister, he accused Chief of Staff Rafael Eitan of "lying to the government" and told Prime Minister Begin "You have lost control of the defence establishment." He retired from politics in 1981.

Yadin was married to Carmela (née Ruppin), who worked with him throughout his career in translating and editing his books and with whom he had two daughters, Orly and Littal. He died in 1984 from heart attack and was buried in the military cemetery in Mount Herzl in Jerusalem. The Israeli actor Yossi Yadin was his brother.

== Published works ==
- Views of the Biblical World. Jerusalem: International Publishing Company J-m Ltd, 1959.
- The Art of Warfare in Biblical Lands. McGraw-Hill, 1963.
- Masada: Herod's Fortress and the Zealots' Last Stand. New York: Random House, 1966.
- Hazor (Schweich Lectures for 1970)
- The Bar Kochba Caves. (Hebrew). Maariv, 1971
- Bar-Kokhba: The Rediscovery of the Legendary Hero of the Second Jewish Revolt against Rome. New York: Random House, 1971
- The Temple Scroll published posthumously London, Weidenfeld & Nicolson, 1985

Yadin published many research papers and ancient text explanations, at the Hebrew University press (in Hebrew):

- The Sons of Light against Sons of Darkness (from the Qumran Caves), 1955
- The Message of the Scrolls, 1957
- The Hidden Scrolls, 1958
- The book of Ben Sira, 1965
- Teffilin of Head from the Qumran caves, 1969
- The Temple Scroll (from the Qumran caves), 1977

== See also ==
- List of Israel's Chiefs of the General Staff
- List of Israel Prize recipients
