= Democratic Movement for Change =

Democratic Movement for Change תנועה דמוקרטית לשינוי
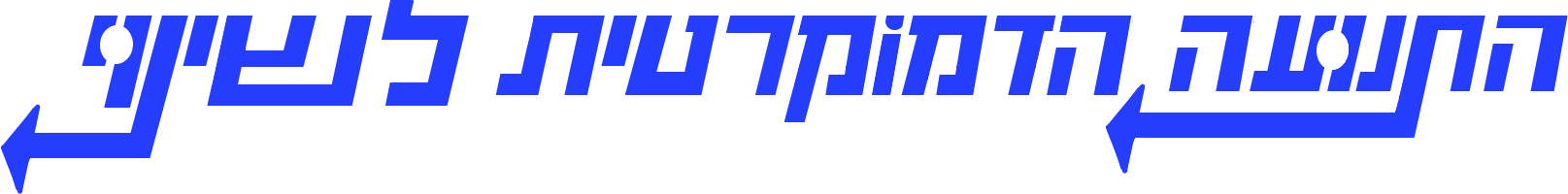
- Leader: Yigael Yadin
- Founded: 2 November 1976
- Dissolved: 14 September 1978
- Ideology: Liberalism (Israeli); Liberal Zionism; Reformism
- Political position: Centre
- Most MKs: 15 (1977)

Election symbol
- יש

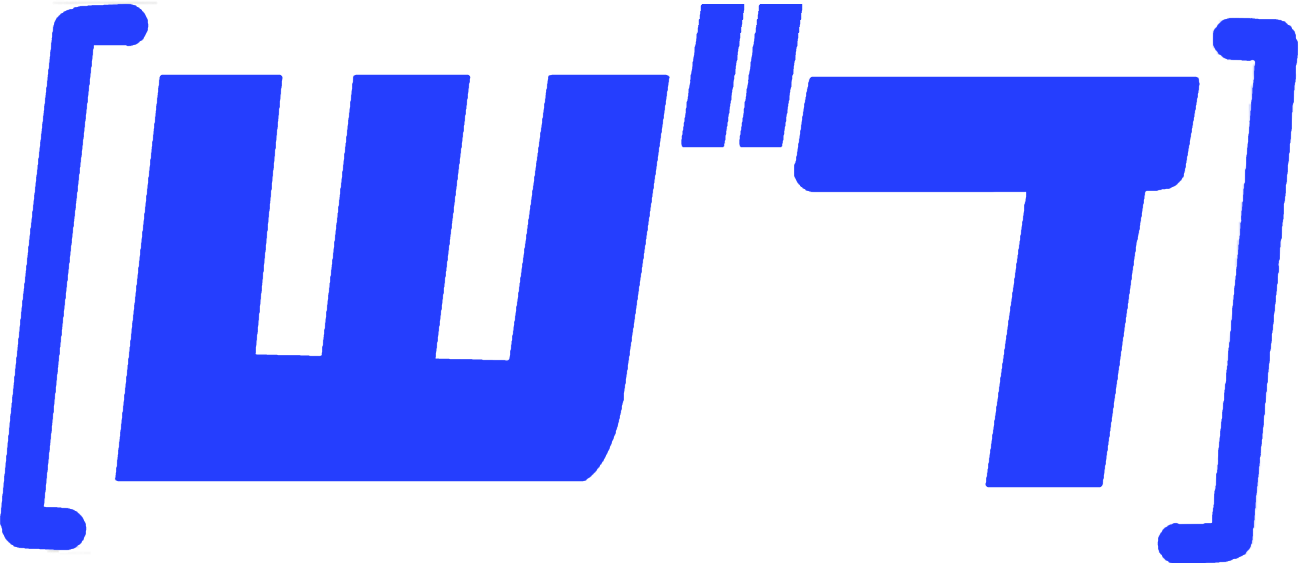
Alternative party symbol

The Democratic Movement for Change (Hebrew: תְּנוּעָה דֶּמוֹקְרָטִית לְשִׁינּוּי, Tnu'a Demokratit LeShinui), commonly known by its Hebrew abbreviation Dash (Hebrew: ד״ש), was a liberal and Zionist political party in Israel. Formed in 1976 by a group that included several prominent public figures who were not career politicians, it was regarded as a centrist party. Although it achieved initial electoral success, it was dissolved in 1978 after two years of activity.

== Background ==
Dash was established on 2 November 1976 through the merger of several liberal movements including Shinui, along with a number of prominent public figures including Yigael Yadin, Amnon Rubinstein, Shmuel Tamir, Meir Amit and Meir Zorea, as well as business leaders, academics and some Arabs. The party's creation reflected growing public dissatisfaction with the dominant political establishment, particularly the ruling Alignment, which and its precursor parties, had governed Israel since the state's formation in 1948. Following the Yom Kippur War in 1973, the Alignment had faced several political scandals, including the suicide of Housing Minister Avraham Ofer after a police investigation into alleged misuse of party funds, the conviction of Bank of Israel governor-designate Asher Yadlin for bribery (the Yadlin affair) and the Dollar Account affair involving Leah Rabin, wife of Prime Minister Yitzhak Rabin, having an overseas bank account, which was illegal in Israel at the time.

Initially named Democrats–Shinui (דֵּמוֹקְרָטִים־שִׁינּוּי, Demokratim–Shinui), the party soon adopted the name Democratic Movement for Change and became widely known by its acronym, Dash. The new party attracted significant public interest, with more than 37,000 people joining shortly after its formation. It introduced internal primary elections to select its electoral list, a system intended to emphasise democratic participation and reduce cronyism. Prior to this, Israeli parties had used internal committees to determine their lists. Since the late 1970s many Israeli parties—with the exception of the Haredi parties Shas and United Torah Judaism—have adopted similar primary systems.

In the 1977 Knesset elections Dash won 15 of the 120 seats, the strongest showing by a third party since 1961. It became the third-largest faction after Menachem Begin's Likud and the Alignment, whose representation declined from 51 to 32 seats. The elections marked a significant political shift, as Likud formed its first government (a 61-seat coalition with Ariel Sharon's Shlomtzion, the National Religious Party and Agudat Yisrael). Dash's success came largely at the expense of the Alignment, particularly among higher-income and better-educated Ashkenazi Jews, indirectly contributing to Likud's victory.

In November 1977 Dash joined Begin's coalition government, receiving several ministerial positions; Meir Amit became Minister of Transportation and Minister of Communications, Shmuel Tamir was appointed Minister of Justice, and Yigael Yadin became Deputy Prime Minister. However, internal divisions soon emerged within the party regarding its role in the government, leading to a gradual breakdown. On 14 September 1978 Dash split into three factions; seven MKs re-established Shinui, another seven formed the Democratic Movement and Assaf Yaguri founded Ya'ad. Shinui and Ya'ad left the coalition, while the Democratic Movement, including Tamir and Yadin, remained.

== Aftermath ==
Subsequent splits further weakened the successor parties of Dash. In 1980, three Democratic Movement members left to form Ahva, and Mordechai Elgrably became an independent MK before joining Equality in Israel – Panthers to establish the Unity Party. Four months before the 1981 Israeli legislative election, the Democratic Movement dissolved. Tamir, Yadin, and Binyamin Halevi served as independents for the remainder of the Knesset term. Tamir lost his ministerial post in 1980, while Yadin continued as Deputy Prime Minister. Ahva also fragmented before the end of the Knesset session, and further defections occurred among Shinui and Ahva members.

The only faction to endure from the breakup of Dash was Shinui, which continued to win seats in subsequent elections. In 1992 it joined the Meretz alliance alongside Mapam and Ratz, though much of its membership later split away under Avraham Poraz in 1997 to establish a new Shinui party after the original formally merged into Meretz. Poraz's Shinui experienced a trajectory similar to that of Dash; in the 2003 elections it won 15 seats, becoming the third-largest party after Likud and Labor. The party joined Ariel Sharon's coalition government but withdrew in late 2005 following disagreements over the budget. Before the 2006 elections internal disputes and leadership changes led to a split into three separate factions, none of which won seats.

Shinui was later succeeded in its role as the principal liberal Zionist party by Kadima, which had formed as a breakaway from Likud, and subsequently by Yesh Atid, founded and led by Yair Lapid, the son of former Shinui leader Tommy Lapid.

== Leaders ==
Leader	Took office	Left office
Yigael Yadin	1976	1978

== Election results ==
Election	Votes	%	Seats	+/–	Leader	Status
1977	202,265 (#3)	11.6	15 / 120	New party	Yigael Yadin	Government

== Knesset members ==
Knesset (MKs)	Knesset Members
9th (15)	Meir Amit, Shafik Asaad, Zeidan Atashi, Mordechai Elgrably, David Golomb, Binyamin Halevi, Akiva Nof, Amnon Rubinstein, Shmuel Tamir, Shmuel Toledano, Mordechai Virshubski, Stef Wertheimer, Yigael Yadin, Assaf Yaguri, Meir Zorea (replaced by Shlomo Eliyahu)
