= Ya'ad (political party) =

Ya'ad יעד
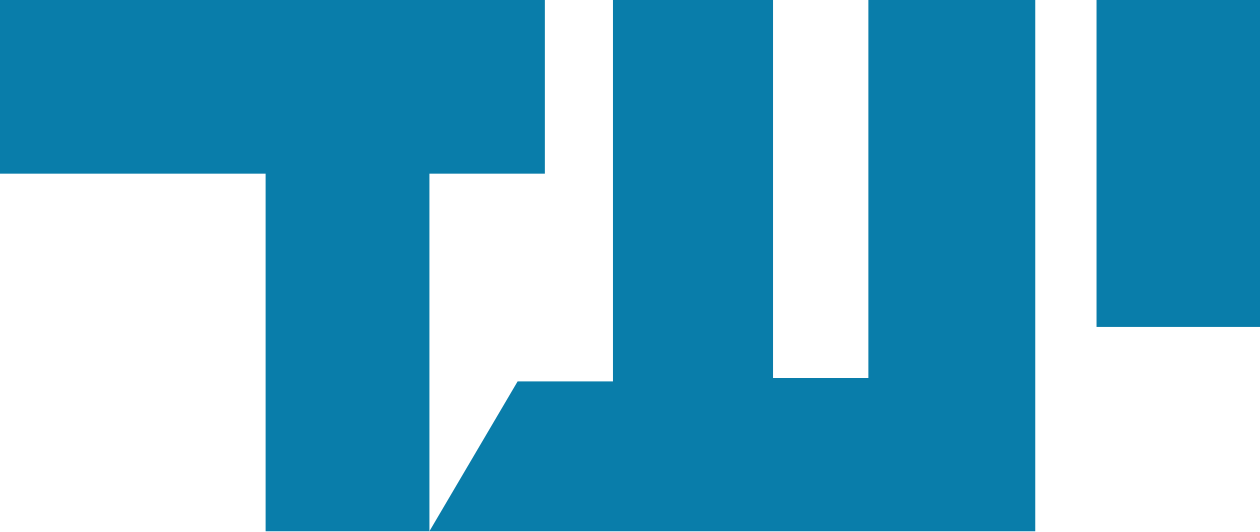
- Leader: Assaf Yaguri
- Founded: September 1978
- Split from: Democratic Movement for Change
- Most MKs: 1 (1977)

Election symbol
- יט

Ya'ad (Hebrew: יעד, lit. 'Goal') was a short-lived, one-man political party in Israel. It is not related to the other political party of the same name, Ya'ad – Civil Rights Movement.

== Background ==
The party was formed on 14 September 1978 during the ninth Knesset by Assaf Yaguri after the spectacular breakup of Dash. However, it disappeared after the 1981 elections when it failed to pass the electoral threshold.
