= 1977 Israeli legislative election =

- 17 May 1977
- All 120 seats in the Knesset; 61 seats needed for a majority
- Turnout: 79.23% (▲0.65pp)
Party	Leader	Vote %	Seats	+/–
Likud	Menachem Begin	33.41	43	+4
Alignment	Shimon Peres	24.60	32	−19
Dash	Yigael Yadin	11.57	15	New
Mafdal	Yosef Burg	9.20	12	+2
Hadash	Meir Vilner	4.58	5	+1
Agudat Yisrael	Yehuda Meir Abramowicz	3.36	4	+2
Flatto-Sharon	Shmuel Flatto-Sharon	2.01	1	New
Shlomtzion	Ariel Sharon	1.94	2	New
Sheli	Aryeh Eliav	1.56	2	+1
United Arab List	Seif el-Din el-Zoubi	1.38	1	−2
PAI	Kalman Kahana	1.35	1	−1
Ratz	Shulamit Aloni	1.18	1	−2
Independent Liberals	Gideon Hausner	1.17	1	−3
This lists parties that won seats. See the complete results below.
Prime Minister before	Prime Minister after
Yitzhak Rabin; Alignment	Menachem Begin; Likud

Legislative elections were held in Israel on 17 May 1977 to elect the ninth Knesset. For the first time in Israeli political history, the right wing, led by Likud, won a plurality of seats, ending almost 30 years of rule by the left-wing Alignment and its predecessor, Mapai. The dramatic shift in Israeli politics caused by the outcome led to it becoming known as "the upheaval" (Hebrew: המהפך, HaMahapakh), a phrase coined by TV anchor Haim Yavin when he announced the election results live on television with the words "Ladies and gentlemen—an upheaval!" (Hebrew: !גבירותי ורבותי—מהפך, Gvirotai veRabotai—Mahapakh!). The election saw the beginning of a period lasting almost two decades where the left- and right-wing blocs held roughly equal numbers of seats in the Knesset.

Voter turnout was 79%.

== Background ==
The Alignment was re-elected in December 1973, following the Yom Kippur War, but continued in-fighting and investigation into Israel's preparedness led to the resignations of Prime Minister Golda Meir and Minister of Defense, Moshe Dayan the following April. This led to a power struggle between former Chief of Staff and Ambassador to the United States Yitzhak Rabin and Transportation Minister Shimon Peres. Rabin was elected by the party by a small margin; it was felt that the Labor Party (the major faction of the Alignment) needed a candidate untouched by the disastrous war. Rabin formed a new government on 3 June 1974, and presided uneasily over a quarrelsome coalition, with Shimon Peres as Defense Minister; their bitter feud dates from this period.

During the mid-1970s, American Secretary of State Henry Kissinger sought to progress a peace deal between Israel and the Arab countries. The Sinai Interim Agreement was signed on 4 September 1975 following a threatened 'reassessment' of the United States' regional policy and its relations with Israel. Rabin notes it was "an innocent-sounding term that heralded one of the worst periods in American–Israeli relations". Despite progress on the Egyptian front, settlement activity in the West Bank increased with support from Peres and some National Religious Party members.

General strikes and protests on 30 March 1976 turned violent. Six unarmed demonstrators were killed by the IDF and police. At least 100 Arabs were wounded and many others jailed. The event is commemorated annually as Land Day. Despite Arab MKs being brought into the government as Deputy Ministers for the first time in the early 1970s, support for the traditional Arab political parties such as Progress and Development and the Arab List for Bedouins and Villagers, which were aligned with Mapai and the Alignment, was on the wane, as they were replaced by independent Arab parties, such as the United Arab List formed in 1977 by former members of Alignment-allied parties.

Inflation had been an issue for the government since the start of the 1970s, and worsened after the oil crisis that followed the Yom Kippur War. To try and cope with the issue, Rabin's government had devalued the pound by around 50% during its term in office.

Several corruption scandals also affected the government. The Yadlin affair of 1976 involved Asher Yadlin, a major fundraiser for the Labor Party (the major faction of the Alignment) and head of the Kupat Holim health-insurance program, who in September that year was about to be appointed Governor of the Bank of Israel. However, after Yadlin was detained by police, on 24 October the cabinet decided to appoint Arnon Gafni instead. In mid-December Yadlin was charged with taking bribes totalling IL280,000, as well as other offences, and was remanded in custody until his trial. On 14 March 1977, Yadlin pleaded guilty to some of the charges, involving bribes totalling IL124,000, but claimed that he had handed over IL80,000 of the money to Labor Party funds, adding that he had raised "millions" for the party. The judge did not accept his claim and sentenced him to five years' imprisonment and a fine of IL250,000.

The Yadlin affair also brought Minister of Housing Avraham Ofer to the police's attention. In November 1976, Yigal Laviv, a correspondent of the weekly HaOlam HaZeh who had also been involved in airing the charges against Yadlin, gave the police information on 30 different matters raising suspicions of offences committed by Ofer, including allegations of embezzlement in Shikun Ovdim funds in favour of the party. The police examined Laviv's charges, but came to the conclusion toward the end of the year that they were not substantiated, leading Ofer to expect that an official statement clearing him would soon be made. However, Attorney General Aharon Barak decided to prosecute. On 31 December, however, a witness in the Yadlin affair sent the police a statement which raised more questions for investigation, and various rumours were published about possible charges. On 2 January, Rabin and Justice Minister Haim Yosef Zadok assured Ofer that everything possible would be done to expedite the inquiry. On 3 January 1977 his body was found in his car on a Tel Aviv beach. In a suicide note Ofer said he was innocent, but did not have the strength "to bear any more". He was reported to have been particularly depressed by the lack of support from his political associates.

Towards the end of 1976, Rabin's coalition with the National Religious Party suffered a crisis: a motion of no confidence had been brought by Agudat Yisrael over a breach of the Sabbath on an Israeli Air Force base, when four F-15 jets were delivered from the US, and the NRP had abstained from the vote. Rabin dissolved his government on 22 December 1976 and decided on new elections, which were to be held in May 1977.

== Parliament factions ==
The table below lists the parliamentary factions represented in the 8th Knesset.

Name	Ideology	Symbol	Leader	1973 result		Seats at 1976 dissolution
Name	Ideology	Symbol	Leader	Votes (%)	Seats	Seats at 1976 dissolution
Alignment	Social democracy Labor Zionism	אמת	Shimon Peres	39.6%	51 / 120	51 / 120
Likud - Gahal, National List, Free Centre	National liberalism	חל טעם	Menachem Begin	30.2%	39 / 120	32 / 120
Mafdal	Religious Zionism	ב	Yosef Burg	8.3%	10 / 120	10 / 120
Agudat Yisrael	Religious conservatism	ג	Yehuda Meir Abramowicz	3.8% (Note: Agudat Yisrael and PAI ran as a joint list called Religious Torah Front.)	3 / 120	3 / 120
Poalei Agudat Yisrael	Religious conservatism	ד	Kalman Kahana	3.8%	2 / 120	2 / 120
Independent Liberals	Liberalism	לע	Moshe Kol	3.6%	4 / 120	4 / 120
Rakah	Communism; Socialism	ו	Meir Vilner	3.4%	4 / 120	4 / 120
Ratz	Progressivism; Secularism	רצ	Shulamit Aloni	2.2%	3 / 120	3 / 120
Progress and Development	Arab satellite list	רא	Seif el-Din el-Zoubi	1.4%	2 / 120	2 / 120
Moked	Socialism	קנ	Meir Pa'il	1.4%	1 / 120	1 / 120
Arab List for Bedouin and Villagers	Arab satellite list	עא	Hamad Abu Rabia	1.0%	1 / 120	1 / 120

== Party preparations ==
=== Alignment ===
Internal elections were held in the Labor Party on 23 February 1977, in which Rabin beat Peres by 1,445 votes to 1,404. However, on 15 March Haaretz reported that Rabin and his wife, Leah, held a US Dollar bank account, then illegal under Israeli law. Although Leah claimed responsibility, the Dollar Account affair, as it became known, resulted in Rabin's resignation from head of the Alignment list on 8 April, and his replacement as head of the Alignment list by Peres.

=== Likud ===
Although polls suggested that Likud may win a historic victory, party leader Menachem Begin suffered a heart attack shortly before the election, and did not participate in the campaign. The Likud campaign leading up to the election had centred on Begin's personality. Demonized by the Alignment as totalitarian and extremist, his self-portrayal as a humble and pious leader struck a chord with many who felt abandoned by the ruling party's ideology, particularly the predominantly Mizrahi working class living in urban neighbourhoods and peripheral towns.

=== Dash ===
On 2 November 1976, former Chief of Staff Yigael Yadin announced the formation of a new party to be called Democrats - Change, later renamed the Democratic Movement for Change, known by its Hebrew acronym, Dash. It consisted of several liberal movements (including Shinui), together with numerous public figures, including Amnon Rubinstein, Shmuel Tamir, Meir Amit, Meir Zorea and several other business leaders and academics, as well as some Israeli Arabs.

Within a few weeks the party had 37,000 members, and it became the first party to hold primary elections to choose its Knesset list.

=== New parties ===
The Left Camp of Israel was formed before the elections by the merger of Meri, Moked, the Independent Socialist Faction and some members of the Black Panthers. The United Arab List had been formed by former members of the Alignment-allied Arab parties.

Businessman Shmuel Flatto-Sharon formed his own list (named after himself). Barely speaking Hebrew, Flatto-Sharon was hoping to be elected to the Knesset to avoid extradition to France, where he had been charged with embezzling $60 million. The list ran on right-wing populism (he was a supporter of the Gush Emunim settlement movement) and promises to provide apartments to young voters. Ultimately the list won enough votes for two seats, but only took one due to Flatto-Sharon being the only candidate on the party's list. Ariel Sharon, who had left Likud in 1975 to serve as an advisor to Rabin, formed a new party Shlomtzion, whilst Marcia Freedman, formerly a Ratz MK had formed the Women's Party.

== Results ==
The Flatto-Sharon list won enough votes for two seats, but only had one candidate. Its second seat was reallocated to the National Religious Party instead.

Party	Votes	%	Seats	+/–
Likud	583,968	33.41	43	+4
Alignment	430,023	24.60	32	−19
Democratic Movement for Change	202,265	11.57	15	New
National Religious Party	160,787	9.20	12	+2
Hadash	80,118	4.58	5	+1
Agudat Yisrael	58,652	3.36	4	+1
Flatto-Sharon	35,049	2.01	1	New
Shlomtzion	33,947	1.94	2	New
Left Camp of Israel	27,281	1.56	2	+1
United Arab List	24,185	1.38	1	−1
Poalei Agudat Yisrael	23,571	1.35	1	−1
Ratz	20,621	1.18	1	−2
Independent Liberals	20,384	1.17	1	−3
Movement for the Renewal of Social Zionism	14,516	0.83	0	New
Beit Yisrael	9,505	0.54	0	New
Arab Reform Movement	5,695	0.33	0	New
Women's Party	5,674	0.32	0	New
Kach	4,396	0.25	0	0
Hofesh	2,498	0.14	0	New
New Generation	1,802	0.10	0	New
Zionist Panthers	1,798	0.10	0	New
Do Kiyum BeTzedek	1,085	0.06	0	New
Total	1,747,820	100.00	120	0
Valid votes	1,747,820	98.65		
Invalid/blank votes	23,906	1.35		
Total votes	1,771,726	100.00		
Registered voters/turnout	2,236,293	79.23		
Source: IDI, Nohlen et al.

== Aftermath ==
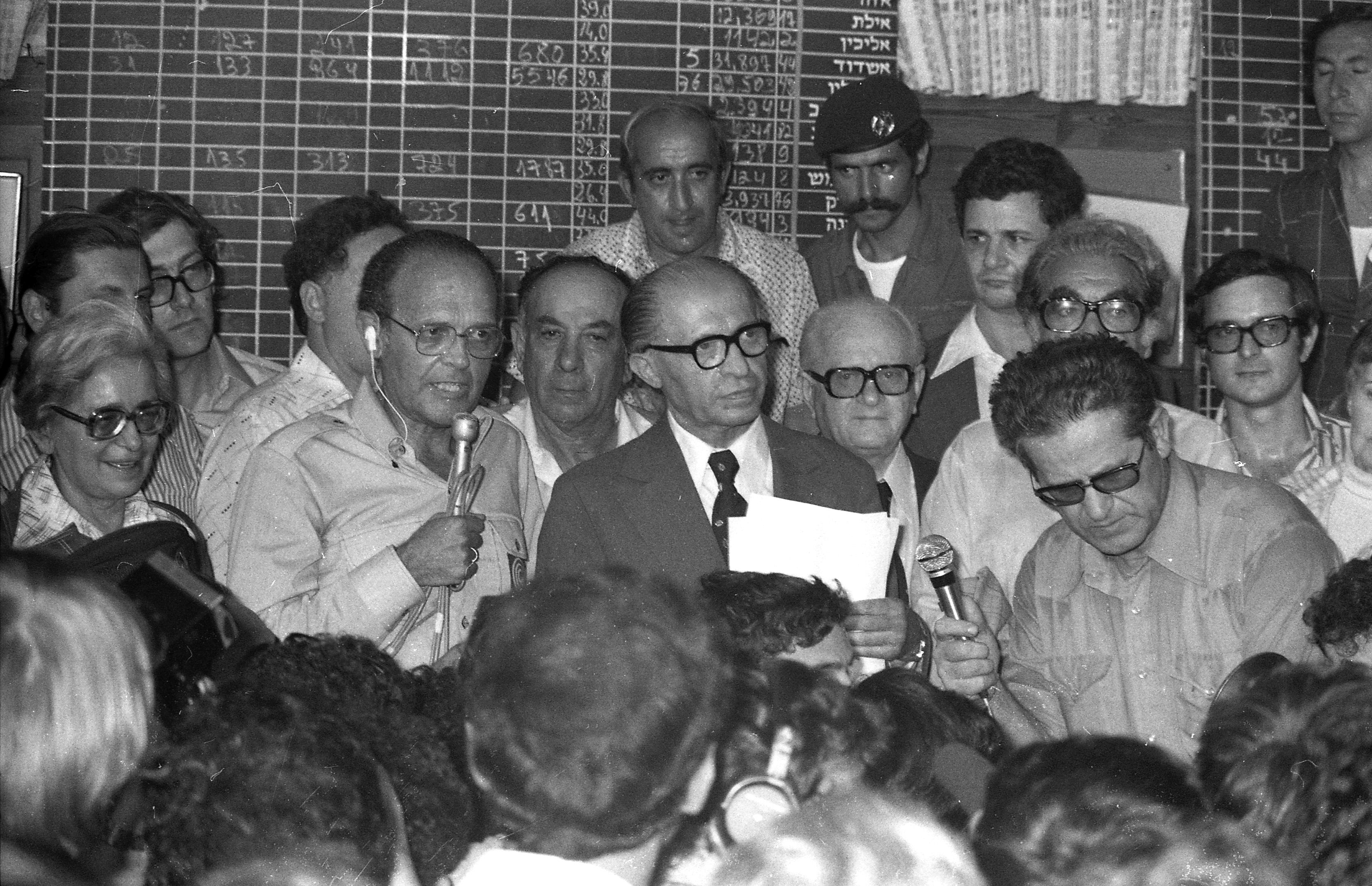
Menachem Begin shortly after the news that Likud had won the most seats

Likud's Menachem Begin formed the country's eighteenth government on 20 June 1977; the coalition initially included the National Religious Party, Agudat Yisrael and Shlomtzion, which soon merged into Likud. This ended the historic alliance between religious parties and the previously dominant left-wing bloc, and initiated a period of alliance between religious parties and the right-wing bloc (later known as National camp). The cabinet also included Moshe Dayan, formerly of the Alignment, as Foreign Minister; this resulted in Dayan's expulsion from the Labor party and he formed the short-lived Telem party.

Begin kept four ministerial portfolios empty (Communications, Justice, Labour and Social Welfare and Transportation), hoping to persuade Dash to join the government. This was achieved on 24 October, with Yadin being appointed Deputy Prime Minister. However, the coalition commanded a majority without the votes of Dash members, and the party collapsed after less than a year, splitting into three factions on 14 September 1978; seven MKs founded Shinui, seven founded the Democratic Movement and Assaf Yaguri founded Ya'ad. The Democratic Movement later split up when three MKs founded Ahva and Yigael Yadin, Binyamin Halevi, Mordechai Elgrably and Shmuel Tamir left to sit as independents, while Zeidan Atashi and David Golomb defected from Shinui to the Alignment. Two Ahva MKs later left the faction; Shafik Assad to join Telem and Akiva Nof to join Likud.

The Camp David Accords and the Egypt–Israel peace treaty which resulted in an Israeli withdrawal from Sinai led to Tehiya and One Israel breaking away from Likud. Begin relied on opposition votes to pass the treaty in the Knesset as several party members, including future Prime Ministers Ariel Sharon and Yitzhak Shamir objected to it and abstained from voting. Three Likud MKs broke away to form Rafi – National List; one later returned, while the other two joined Moshe Dayan's new Telem party. Other defections included Saadia Marciano leaving the Left Camp of Israel and formed the Unity Party with independent MK, Mordechai Elgrably and Yosef Tamir defecting from Likud to Shinui, before sitting as an independent.

During the Knesset term, United Arab List MK Hamad Abu Rabia was assassinated by the sons of party rival Jabr Moade after Abu Rabia allegedly refused to give up his seat as had been decided in a rotation agreement. Despite his sons' actions, Moade replaced Abu Rabia in the Knesset.

== See also ==
- List of members of the ninth Knesset
