= 1981 Israeli legislative election =

- 30 June 1981
- All 120 seats in the Knesset; 61 seats needed for a majority
- Turnout: 78.50% (▼0.73pp)
| Party | Leader | Vote % | Seats | +/– |
|---|---|---|---|---|
| Likud | Menachem Begin | 37.11 | 48 | +3 |
| Alignment | Shimon Peres | 36.57 | 47 | +15 |
| Mafdal | Yosef Burg | 4.92 | 6 | −6 |
| Agudat Yisrael | Avraham Yosef Shapira | 3.73 | 4 | 0 |
| Hadash | Meir Vilner | 3.35 | 4 | −1 |
| Tehiya | Yuval Ne'eman | 2.31 | 3 | New |
| Tami | Aharon Abuhatzira | 2.30 | 3 | New |
| Telem | Moshe Dayan | 1.58 | 2 | New |
| Shinui | Amnon Rubinstein | 1.54 | 2 | −5 |
| Ratz | Shulamit Aloni | 1.44 | 1 | 0 |
This lists parties that won seats. See the complete results below.
| Prime Minister before | Prime Minister after |
|---|---|
| Menachem Begin; Likud | Menachem Begin; Likud |

Legislative elections were held in Israel on 30 June 1981 to elect the 120 members of the Knesset. The ruling Likud won one more seat than the opposition Alignment, in line with many polls which had predicted a tight race. Voter turnout was 78.5%, with Likud receiving around ten thousand more than the Alignment. This elections highlighted the polarization in the country.

== Background ==
Prior to the elections, Menachem Begin's government faced instability due to internal conflict amongst coalition partners and international pressures, as well as issues with corruption, and failure to pass legislation. Discontent with the government was growing, and 40% of people agreed that "the major problems facing the state and the entire political system must be changed and a strong government of leaders and independent of parties should take control".

== Parliament factions ==
The table below lists the parliamentary factions at the end of the 9th Knesset.

| Name | Ideology | Symbol | Leader | 1977 result | | Seats at 1981 dissolution |
| Name | Ideology | Symbol | Leader | Votes (%) | Seats | Seats at 1981 dissolution |
|---|---|---|---|---|---|---|
| Likud | National liberalism | מחל | Menachem Begin | 33.4% | 43 / 120 | 40 / 120 |
| Alignment | Social democracy Labor Zionism | אמת | Shimon Peres | 24.6% | 32 / 120 | 33 / 120 |
| Democratic Movement | Liberalism | dissolved (Note: The party had 3 MKs at time of dissolution, all of whom sat as independents for the remainder of the term.) | Yigael Yadin | 11.6% (Note: Democratic Movement for Change) | 15 / 120 | 0 / 120 |
| Shinui | Liberalism; Centrism | הן | Amnon Rubinstein | 11.6% | 0 / 120 | 5 / 120 |
| Ahva | Liberalism | did not run | Shlomo Eliahu | 11.6% | 0 / 120 | 1 / 120 |
| Ya'ad | Liberalism | יט | Assaf Yaguri | 11.6% | 0 / 120 | 1 / 120 |
| Mafdal | Religious Zionism | ב | Yosef Burg | 9.2% | 12 / 120 | 12 / 120 |
| Hadash | Communism; Socialism | ו | Meir Vilner | 4.6% | 5 / 120 | 5 / 120 |
| Agudat Yisrael | Religious conservatism | ג | Yehuda Meir Abramowicz | 3.3% | 4 / 120 | 4 / 120 |
| Telem | Centrism | כן | Moshe Dayan | - | 0 / 120 | 4 / 120 |
| Tehiya | Ultranationalism; Revisionist Zionism | ת | Yuval Ne'eman; Geula Cohen | - | 0 / 120 | 2 / 120 |
| Development and Peace | Right-wing populism | פש | Shmuel Flatto-Sharon | 2.0% | 1 / 120 | 1 / 120 |
| Shlomtzion | Liberal conservatism | כנ | Ariel Sharon | 1.9% | 2 / 120 | 0 / 120 |
| One Israel | Liberal conservatism | ט | Yitzhak Yitzhaky | 1.9% | 0 / 120 | 1 / 120 |
| Sheli | Socialism; Pacifism | ש | Meir Pa'il (Note: Walid Haj Yahia was the party's sole MK at the dissolution of the Knesset.) | 1.6% | 2 / 120 | 1 / 120 |
| United Arab List | Arab satellite list | ימ | Seif el-Din el-Zoubi | 1.4% | 1 / 120 | 1 / 120 |
| Poalei Agudat Yisrael | Religious conservatism | ד | Kalman Kahana | 1.3% | 1 / 120 | 1 / 120 |
| Ratz | Progressivism; Secularism | רצ | Shulamit Aloni | 1.2% | 1 / 120 | 1 / 120 |
| Independent Liberals | Liberalism | לע | Gideon Hausner | 1.2% | 1 / 120 | 1 / 120 |
| Unity Party | Socialism; Equality for Mizrahi Jews | זה | Saadia Marciano | - | 0 / 120 | 2 / 120 |
| Independent | - | - | - | - | 0 / 120 | 4 / 120 |

== Electoral system ==
The 120 seats in the Knesset were elected by closed list proportional representation, with seats allocated using the D'Hondt method. This led to numerous parties winning seats and multi-party government coalitions.

== Campaign ==
A rally for the Labor Party at the Tzova kibbutz leading up to the 1981 elections.

Since 1965 parties had begun abandoning attempts to frame moral issues in favor of spreading wider nets to catch a bigger range of voters. Rather than focusing on controversial issues that divided them, parties took to forming clusters that resorted to "emotive catchwords" and the lowest common denominator. The party clusters had set aside fundamental ideals in order to work together, which meant that infighting amongst the coalitions was inevitable.

Menachem Begin, Likud's most popular candidate, served as a strong factor for the party's resurgence. 41% of the adult Jews responded in favor of seeing Begin as prime minister, with 49% saying Begin would better be able to deal with the country's problems. The Alignment, whose announcement of potential major ministerial appointments failed to include Yitzhak Rabin, left the impression of a power-hungry group of politicians, with animosity between party leaders Shimon Peres and Rabin.

Public perception of the parties became instrumental in the elections; throughout the campaign the Alignment was seen and painted as the establishment party, considered by 48% of Israeli citizens surveyed to be more old-fashioned, despite its opposition to the government for the four years prior. The Alignment was also seen as self-interested by rather than interested in the good of the people, as well as corrupt. Likud, meanwhile, was seen as slightly stronger (50% as compared with the Alignment's 44%), more honest (57%), and more concerned with the fate of the citizens than that of the party (45%). Likud was able to benefit from having only been created 8 years prior, giving it an image of newness and innocence.

Public perception of the parties
| Characteristic | Ideal | Alignment | Likud |
|---|---|---|---|
| Strong/weak | 93/92 | 44/33 | 50/33 |
| Right/left | 55/13 | 28/40 | 77/7 |
| Old-fashioned/progressive | 15/61 | 48/26 | 42/31 |
| Middle class/working class | 28/32 | 27/42 | 55/14 |
| Young/old | 52/10 | 17/51 | 28/35 |
| Sephardi/Ashkenazi | 11/11 | 6/47 | 18/25 |
| Worries about itself/the citizens | 3/89 | 43/37 | 31/45 |
| Inexperienced/experienced | 4/86 | 4/79 | 45/38 |
| Honest/corrupt | | 35/39 | 57/18 |
| Cannot/can be believed | | 36/42 | 32/48 |

=== Ethnic tensions ===
The 1981 elections also saw a rise in the use of ethnic ideas within the political discourse. While Likud and the Alignment were both led by Ashkenazi politicians, the Alignment was considered the party of the Ashkenazi Jews, with the Sephardic vote lost to Likud. The likelihood of Sephardim voting for Likud and Ashkenazim voting for the Alignment was more pronounced than ever before. However, Likud enjoyed the advantage of still being able to appeal to a significant number of Ashkenazi voters, while also maintaining their Sephardi popularity; in contrast, the Alignment was seen as even less Sephardi than in previous years.

Ethnicity was a key theme in Begin's Tchach-Tchachim Speech, in response to the racial slur used by Dudu Topaz. He praised pre-state militants from Middle Eastern backgrounds, including one who played a role in the King David Hotel bombing. The most famous line: "They fastened the grenade to their hearts, and they pulled the pin. An Ashkenazi Jew? An Iraqi Jew? They were Jews! Brothers! Warriors!" referred to two of the Olei Hagardom who killed themselves in a Jerusalem prison in 1947.

=== Conduct ===
Police noted before election day that "there hasn't been an election campaign in Israel as violent as the present one". A reason for the violence may have been that this was the first elections in which the public believed both sides had a chance of winning, causing unrest and agitation.

=== Party slogans ===
| Party or alliance | Original slogan | English translation |
|---|---|---|
| Likud | "הליכוד בדרך הנכונה" | "Likud is on the right track" |
| Alignment | "יחד ישראל חזקה" | "Together Israel is strong" |
| Mafdal | "אני עם הסרוגה" | "I'm with the knitted [kippah]" |
| Hadash | "תן קולך לחד"ש- תן קולך להדברות ולשלום" | "Cast your vote for Hadash – cast your vote for dialogue and peace" |
| Tehiya | "להרים את הדגל בכנסת" | "Raising the flag in the Knesset |
| Sheli | "אומץ במלחמה - אומץ לשלום!" | "Courage in war - courage for peace!" |
| Ratz | "אני רצ עכשיו" | "I'm running [Ratz] now" |
| Tami | "בקומה זקופה!" | "Stand up straight!" |

== Results ==
Scholars attribute the Likud's comeback, from its lowest point six months prior to the 1981 legislative election, to five main factors: incumbency, candidates, images, campaigns, violence, and ethnicity. Likud's role as the ruling party enabled the party to use its incumbency advantage to increase popularity with policy implementation. The party implemented tax programs that lowered prices for consumers, subsidized oil products at a higher rate than ever before, and used foreign policy that made the Alignment seem unpatriotic if they argued against the moves.

| Party | Votes | % | Seats | +/– |
|---|---|---|---|---|
| Likud | 718,941 | 37.11 | 48 | +3 |
| Alignment | 708,536 | 36.57 | 47 | +15 |
| National Religious Party | 95,232 | 4.92 | 6 | −6 |
| Agudat Yisrael | 72,312 | 3.73 | 4 | 0 |
| Hadash | 64,918 | 3.35 | 4 | −1 |
| Tehiya | 44,700 | 2.31 | 3 | New |
| Tami | 44,466 | 2.30 | 3 | New |
| Telem | 30,600 | 1.58 | 2 | New |
| Shinui | 29,837 | 1.54 | 2 | –5 |
| Ratz | 27,921 | 1.44 | 1 | 0 |
| Poalei Agudat Yisrael | 17,090 | 0.88 | 0 | −1 |
| Independent Liberals | 11,764 | 0.61 | 0 | −1 |
| United Arab List | 11,590 | 0.60 | 0 | −1 |
| Development and Peace | 10,823 | 0.56 | 0 | −1 |
| Left Camp of Israel | 8,691 | 0.45 | 0 | −2 |
| Arab Brotherhood List | 8,304 | 0.43 | 0 | New |
| List for Aliyah | 6,992 | 0.36 | 0 | New |
| Kach | 5,128 | 0.26 | 0 | 0 |
| Independence | 4,710 | 0.24 | 0 | New |
| One Israel | 3,726 | 0.19 | 0 | New |
| Arab Citizens' List | 2,596 | 0.13 | 0 | New |
| Pensioners' List | 2,404 | 0.12 | 0 | New |
| Unity Party | 1,293 | 0.07 | 0 | New |
| Ya'ad | 1,228 | 0.06 | 0 | New |
| Otzma | 839 | 0.04 | 0 | New |
| Tent Movement | 545 | 0.03 | 0 | New |
| Abolish Income Tax | 503 | 0.03 | 0 | New |
| Amkha | 460 | 0.02 | 0 | New |
| Youth Movement | 412 | 0.02 | 0 | New |
| Council to Rescue the Homeland | 405 | 0.02 | 0 | New |
| Initiative–Independents Movement | 400 | 0.02 | 0 | New |
| Total | 1,937,366 | 100.00 | 120 | 0 |
| Valid votes | 1,937,366 | 99.12 | | |
| Invalid/blank votes | 17,243 | 0.88 | | |
| Total votes | 1,954,609 | 100.00 | | |
| Registered voters/turnout | 2,490,014 | 78.50 | | |
Source: IDI, Nohlen et al.

== Aftermath ==
Menachim Begin (of the Likud) became Prime Minister and in August 1981 included the National Religious Party, Agudat Yisrael, the Movement for the Heritage of Israel (Tami) and Tehiya in his coalition to form the nineteenth government. After Begin resigned for health reasons, Yitzhak Shamir formed the twentieth government in October 1983, with the same coalition parties.

During the Knesset term, two MKs defected from Likud to the Alignment. Haim Drukman left the National Religious Party and sat as an independent MK, whilst two other MKs left the National Religious Party and formed Gesher – Zionist Religious Centre before returning two weeks later. Telem split into Ometz and the Movement for the Renewal of Social Zionism, whilst Ratz joined the Alignment but then broke away again.

== See also ==
- 1980 Israeli Labor Party leadership election
- The Tchach-Tchachim Speech – famous speech from the 1981 election.
- Tchach-Tchachim – anti-Mizrahi slur from the speech.
