= Ḥazzan (surname) =

Hazan, Chazan, Chasen, Hasson, and Khazan are all alternative spellings of Hazzan, a Hebrew word carried over into most other Jewish languages that refers to the cantor in the Jewish prayer tradition. The surname was commonly adopted throughout the Jewish diaspora.

Khazan is a Russian, Ukrainian, and Ashkenazi Jewish surname, and is a variant of the Hebrew 'Hazzan' and means cantor. When spelled Khazan, the name has typically been transliterated from Cyrillic characters (Хазан), suggesting people of Russian-Jewish descent.

Hazan is a Turkish and Romaniote Jewish surname, and is a variant of the Hebrew 'Hazzan' and means cantor. This variant is carried by the Romaniote Jews between Greece and Turkey.

People with the name Hazan include:

- Abraham Chazan (1849–1917), Breslover rabbi
- Abraham Hazzan (fl. 16th century), cantor and Biblical commentator in Kremenetz, Volhynia
- Adeline Hazan (born 1965), French politician
- Al Hazan, American musician
- Alon Hazan (born 1967), Israeli former association footballer, and head coach of the Israel national under-21 football team
- Bela Yaari Hazan (1922–2004), a Polish resistance member of World War II
- John Hazan (1926–1988), British judge
- Marcella Hazan (1924–2013), Italian writer
- Nachman Chazan (1813–1884), Breslover rabbi
- Naomi Hazan (born 1946), Israeli politician
- Oren Hazan (born 1981), Israeli politician
- Samuel Hazan (born 1983), Israeli footballer
- Susan Hazan, Israeli museum curator
- Shani Hazan (born 1992), Israeli model, singer, and Miss Israel 2012
- Yaakov Hazan (1899–1992), Israeli politician
- Yehiel Hazan (born 1958), Israeli politician

== See also ==
- Hazan, EMI recording name for Nazia and Zoheb 1980s Pakistan singers, The Hassans
- Hazan (name)
- Hassan (surname)
