= Hazan (name) =

Hazan is a given name and surname. In Turkish, it is a female given name that means "autumn"; derived from the Persian word "χazān" or "khazan." It can also be a Jewish surname, derived from the occupation of hazzan. Notable people with the name include:

== Surname ==
- Marcella Hazan, Italian cooking writer
- Giuliano Hazan, Italian cookbook author
- Rita Hazan, hair colorist
- Alon Hazan, Israeli former footballer
- Ya'akov Hazan, Israeli politician
- Oren Hazan, Israeli politician
- Liran Hazan, Israeli professional footballer
- Shani Hazan, Israeli model
- Adeline Hazan, French politician
- Chaim David Hazan, was an Av Beit Din in İzmir
- Joseph ben Ḥayyim Hazan, Sephardi ḥakham and chief rabbi
- Israel Moses Hazan, Sephardic rabbi
- Samuel Hazan, Canadian-Israeli football player
- Yehiel Hazan, Israeli politician
- Bela Yaari Hazan, Polish Jewish resistance member
- John Hazan, British barrister and judge

== Place ==
- Hazan caves, hiding complex dated to the Bar Kokhba revolt period

== Fictional Characters ==
- Hazan Çamkıran, leading character played by Deniz Baysal in the Turkish drama, Mrs. Fazilet and Her Daughters
- Hazan, leading character played by İpek Filiz Yazıcı in the Turkish drama, Son Nefesime Kadar
- Hazan, fictional character played by Gülperi Özdemir, in the Turkish drama, Sen Anlat Karadeniz

== See also ==
- Ḥazzan (surname)
