= Chwolson =

Chwolson, Khvolson (Russian: Хвольсон) is a surname. Notable people with the surname include:

- Daniel Chwolson (1819–1911), Russian-Jewish orientalist
- Orest Chwolson (1852–1934), Russian physicist, one of the first to study the gravitational lens effect
