= List of Israeli public officials convicted of crimes or misdemeanors =

This is a list of Israeli public officials convicted of crimes or misdemeanors, alphabetized by branch. Only those in the highest levels of the executive, legislative, or judicial branches are included.

== Presidents ==
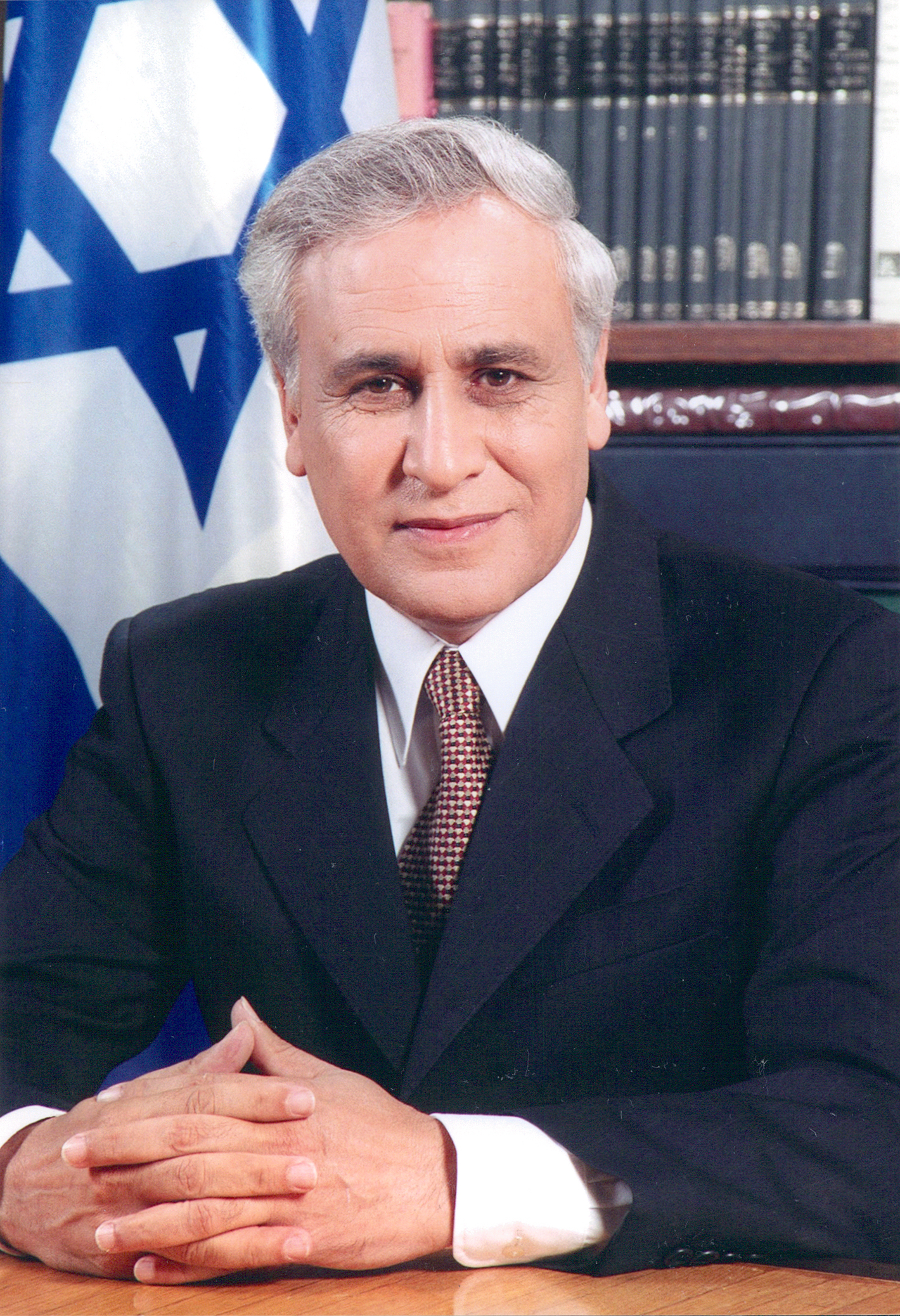
On 30 December 2010, Israel's former President Moshe Katsav was convicted of two counts of rape, obstruction of justice, and other sexual offences by a court in Tel Aviv.

- Moshe Katsav – the 8th president of the State of Israel. In a landmark and unprecedented case, on 30 December 2010, Katsav was convicted of two counts of rape, obstruction of justice, and other charges. On 22 March 2011, in a landmark ruling, Katsav was sentenced to seven years in prison.

== Prime ministers ==
- Ehud Olmert – Prime minister from 2006 to 2009, cabinet minister 1988–1992, 2003–2006, mayor of Jerusalem 1993–2003. Convicted of breach of trust in July 2012, and of bribery in March 2015. In May 2015, Olmert was sentenced to six years in prison, but his sentence was reduced to 18 months in December 2015.

== Ministers ==
- Aharon Abuhatzira – served as the Minister of Religious Services, Minister of Immigrant Absorption, and Minister of Welfare & Social Services. Convicted of larceny, breach of trust, and fraud. Abuhatzira was sentenced to a suspended sentence of four years and three months; thirty months for larceny, eighteen months for breach of trust and fraud by an administrator, and three months for breach of trust by a public servant.
- Itamar Ben-Gvir, the Minister of National Security in the 37th government of Israel, has been previously convicted of inciting racism and supporting a terrorist group.
- Shlomo Benizri – served as Minister of Health and Labor and Social Welfare Minister during the late 1990s and early 2000s. In 2008, Benizri was convicted of accepting bribes, breach of faith, obstructing justice, and conspiracy to commit a crime for accepting favors worth millions of shekels from his friend, contractor Moshe Sela, in exchange for inside information regarding foreign workers scheduled to arrive in Israel. As a result, Benizri was sentenced to 18 months in jail and moral turpitude was added to the offense.
- Aryeh Deri – Minister of Internal Affairs between 1988 and 1993, and (briefly) Deputy Prime Minister in the 37th government of Israel until the Supreme Court removed him due to his previous conviction. Convicted of taking $155,000 in bribes while serving as Interior Minister and given a three-year jail sentence in 2000. Deri was re-elected to the Knesset in 2013, indicted for numerous crimes in 2019; and was convicted again in 2022 for several tax offenses. As part of his plea deal received a year's suspended sentence, paid a NIS 180,000 fine, and resigned from Knesset. Because of his resignation, no decision was made on whether the offenses carried the designation of "moral turpitude" which would again bar him from running for office for seven years.
- Tzachi Hanegbi – Among the top cabinet positions he previously held are Minister of Justice, Minister of Internal Security, and Minister of Intelligence and Nuclear Affairs. On 13 July 2010, Hanegbi was convicted of perjury, and subsequently was fined 10,000 NIS, and moral turpitude was added to the offense. As a result, Hanegbi suspended himself from the Knesset.
- Avraham Hirschson – The Israeli Minister of Finance between 2006 and 2007. In 2009, Hirschson was convicted of stealing close to 2 million shekels from the National Workers Labor Federation while he was its chairman. Hirschson was sentenced to five years and five months in prison and a fine of 450,000 shekels.
- Avigdor Lieberman – Israel's former foreign minister. Lieberman was convicted in September 2001, under a plea bargain, of threatening and assaulting a 12-year-old who had hit his son, and was ordered to pay the child a compensation of 10,000 shekels, and an additional fine of 7,500 shekels.
- Haim Katz briefly served as Minister of Tourism in the 37th government of Israel, and has previously been convicted of fraud.
- Yitzhak Mordechai – Israel's Minister of Defense and Minister of Transport in the 1990s. Mordechai was convicted of harassing and sexually assaulting two women during his military service and later periods. As a result, Mordechai received an 18-month suspended sentence. After his conviction, he resigned from the Knesset.
- Rafael Pinhasi – served as Minister of Communications between 1990 and 1992. In 1997, Pinhasi was convicted of illegal transfer of funds, and sentenced to 12 months probation and a fine.
- Haim Ramon – Israel's Minister of Health, Minister of Internal Affairs, and Minister of Justice. In 2007, Ramon was convicted of an indecent assault without consent, and was sentenced to community service, which he served in a therapeutic riding center in Tel Mond. After serving his community service sentence, Ramon returned to prime minister Ehud Olmert's government in July 2007 as a minister in the Israeli government.
- Gonen Segev – The National Infrastructure Minister of Israel between 1995 and 1996. Segev was convicted for an attempt of drug smuggling, for forgery, and for electronic commerce fraud, all committed after his public career. He was sentenced to five years in prison. He was also found guilty of spying for Iran, and received an 11 year jail term.
- Saleh Tarif – a Druze Knesset member, and first non-Jewish minister. In April 2004 Tarif was convicted of bribery, fraud and breach of trust, and was sentenced to six months of community service, fined 25,000 NIS and a suspended sentence of eight months.

== Knesset members ==
- Yosef Ba-Gad – Former Moledet member convicted of forgery and attempted fraud connected to his attempts to register his political party.
- Naomi Blumenthal – Knesset member in the Likud party. On 13 February 2006, Blumenthal was convicted of bribery and obstruction of justice and was sentenced to 8 months in prison, a ten-month suspended sentence, and a fine of 75,000 shekels.
- Shlomo Dayan – Knesset member in the Shas party. In 2008 Dayan was convicted of fraud and forgery and sentenced to 4 months of community service.
- Shmuel Flatto-Sharon – Knesset member between 1977 and 1981. In 1979, Flatto-Sharon was convicted of false promises of housing solutions for groups and thus sentenced to three months of community service and a suspended sentence of 15 months. In 2000 Flatto-Sharon was convicted of fraudulently receiving a sum of ten million from a French company. In accordance with the plea bargain Flatto-Sharon was sentenced to 11 months in prison, a 1.2 million dollars compensation payment to the French company, as well as a suspended sentence of three years.
- Michael Gorlovsky – Knesset member in the Likud party between 2003 and 2006. Gorlovsky was involved in what became known as the "double votes scam" affair together with MK Yehiel Hazan. In a plea bargain, Gorlovsky was charged with breach of trust rather than fraud, and was sentenced to two months of community service.
- Yehiel Hazan – Knesset member in the Likud party. Hazan was convicted of voting twice during the second and third readings of a bill on the emergency economic plan in May 2003. Hazan was sentenced in June 2006 for 4 months of community service and a six-month suspended prison term.
- Ofer Hugi – Knesset member in the Shas party. On 25 December 2006, Hugi was convicted of various charges related to forgery and fraud. As a result, Hugi was sentenced to two years in prison and ordered to pay a 12,000 shekel fine.
- Meir Kahane – Sole member of the Kach party, convicted of domestic terrorism in the early 1970s prior to moving to Israel in the 1980s. Spent a year in prison for his crimes.
- Faina Kirschenbaum – Deputy minister for Internal Affairs, and member of Yisrael Beitenu. Indicted for an extensive network of bribery. Her accomplice and party headquarter chief was jailed for 7 years.
- Yair Levy – Knesset member in the Shas party between 1988 and 1992. In 1993, he was jailed for five years for embezzling NIS 500,000 from the party's El HaMa'ayan organisation.
- Said Nafa – Druze member of the Balad party. Convicted of illegally entering an enemy state and of contact with a foreign agent.
- Yair Peretz – Knesset member in the Shas party. In March 2006 Peretz was convicted of fraudulently obtaining an academic degree.
- Shmuel Rechtman – Knesset member in the Likud party between 1977 and 1979. In 1979, Rechtman was convicted of taking bribes and was sentenced to imprisonment, thus he became the first Knesset member who was convicted of criminal offenses and sentenced to imprisonment.
- Omri Sharon – Knesset member in the Likud and Kadima parties during the 2000s. In 2006, Sharon was convicted of fraud and sentenced to 9 months in prison.
- Yosef Vanunu – Knesset member in the Israeli Labor Party between 1992 and 1996. In 1997 Vanunu was convicted on charges of bribery, fraud, and breach of trust.
- Haneen Zoabi – Member of Balad party, convicted of insulting a public official after a plea deal. One of the original charges that was dropped was for threatening public officials when she implied violence against Arab-Israeli police officers.
- Oren Hazan – Former Knesset member for Likud, convicted for assault and received 100 hours of community service after assaulting a civil servant in Ariel.

== Chief Rabbis ==
- Eliyahu Bakshi-Doron – Sefardi Chief Rabbi 1993-2003, convicted of fraud for giving out false rabbinic ordinations, the conviction was posthumously cancelled in appeal.
- Yona Metzger – Ashkenazi Chief Rabbi 2003-2013, bribery, fraud, and money laundering. Received a jail sentence of three and a half years and a 5 million shekel fine.

== Mayors ==
- Zvi Bar – Mayor of Ramat Gan 1989-2013, convicted of corruption and sentenced to 5.5 years in prison in June 2015.
- Itamar Shimoni - Mayor of Ashkelon convicted and sentenced to 2 years in jail for paying almost 1 million ILS as hush money to a woman he had extramarital relationship with as well as bribery and breach of trust
- Shlomo Lahiani – Mayor of Bat Yam
- Uri Lupolianski – Mayor of Jerusalem 2003-2008, convicted of corruption in March 2014.
- Shmuel Rechtman – Mayor of Rehovot, convicted of bribery.
- Israel Sadan – Mayor of Hadera, convicted of bribery.

== Other officials ==
- Baruch Abuhatzeira – Deputy Mayor of Ashkelon, convicted of bribery.
- Asher Yadlin – Leading member in the 1960s and 1970s of the Israeli Labor Party, former head of the Kupat Holim Clalit and the Hevrat Ovdim. In 1976, two days before he was due to take office as Governor of the Bank of Israel, Yadlin was arrested and charged with accepting bribes. On conviction, he was sentenced to, and served, five years in prison.
- Ari Harow – Benjamin Netanyahu's chief of staff. Convicted of bribery, fraud, breach of trust and money laundering.

== See also ==
- Corruption in Israel
- Corruption Perceptions Index
- Politics of Israel
- United Nations Convention against Corruption
