= Chasen =

Chasen may refer to:

- Chasen (surname)
- Chasen (band), Christian rock band from Greenville, South Carolina, USA
- ChaSen, morphological parser for the Japanese language
- Chasen's, restaurant in Beverly Hills, California, USA
- Chasen Kanno, American College of Sports Medicine certified personal trainer, Hawaii, USA
- Chasen's mountain pit viper (Garthius chaseni), venomous snake found in Borneo
- Chasen, a bamboo whisk used in Japanese tea ceremony.
- Chasen Shreve, American baseball player
- Chasen Hines (born 2000), American football player
