= Karl May School =

School in Saint Petersburg, Russia

Coordinates: 59.939871°N 30.269317°E

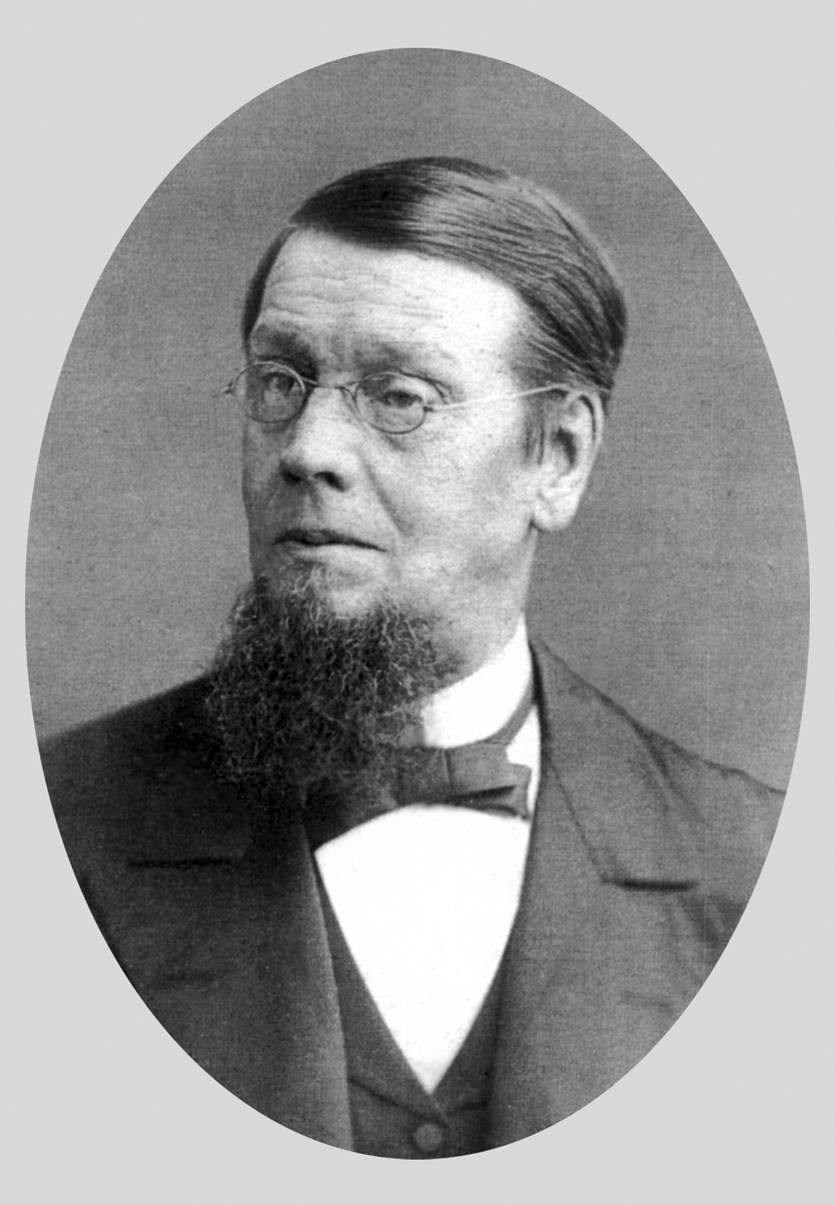
Karl Ivanovich May (1820–1895)

The Karl May School (Russian: Петербургская школа Карла Мая, romanized: Peterburgskaya shkola Karla Maya) is a secondary school in Saint Petersburg, Russia.

== History ==
=== Founding ===
In 1856, on the day of the Autumn Equinox (22 September), on the initiative of a few German families seeking to provide their children with a more applied secondary education than that available in the contemporary State educational institutions, a private German boys' school was opened in a wing of building no. 56, 1st line, on Vasilievsky Island. It was led by Karl Ivanovich May (1820–1895), a talented professional educator and follower of the progressive educational views of A. Diesterweg, J. H. Pestalozzi, N. I. Pirogov, K. D. Ushinsky and F. Fröbel. In 1838, he had graduated with distinction from St. Peter's Principal German College and in 1845 from the historical-philological faculty of the Imperial St-Petersburg University.

=== The first years ===
During its first years the school was elementary, consisting of three classes, but beginning in 1861 it received the official title of "Modern School [Natural Science College] of Gymnasium Rank", which reflected its intensively applied direction in advanced secondary education (in comparison to State educational institutions).

At the end of the 1850s one of the school performances opened with herald walking with flags emblazoned with May bugs; the director and all present were very pleased with this symbol. From that point on, attendees of this school have referred to themselves as May bugs for the rest of their lives.

== Motto ==
The school's was based on the motto of the founder of modern pedagogics, Yan Amos Komensky: First to love, then to teach. In accordance with this slogan, a collective of educators was formed, consisting only of people possessing high moral and professional qualities. The writer Lev Uspensky, a 1918 graduate of the school, remarked in his memoirs (paraphrased): At May there are not and could not be educator-obscurantists, teacher-Black Hundred members, or bureaucrats in uniform. The instructors at May, generation after generation, were selected on the basis of their scholarly and educational gifts.

== System ==
The system of education and upbringing created by K.I. May stipulated mutual respect and trust in the teachers and students, constant cooperation with the family, and the aspiration of the educators to allow for and develop the individual abilities of each student and to teach them to think independently. All this, in combination with the high quality of education, allowed the school year after year to release highly moral, well-rounded youths, prepared for "work useful to society". Thanks to the special atmosphere springing from this educational institution (called the "May spirit"), the K. May School was the "state within a state, separated by an endless ocean from State conventionalism" (aptly expressed by 1890 graduate D.V. Filosofov). Its participants, in terms of both social position and national identification, were quite diverse, without discrimination: Swiss children, sons of the princes Garin, Galitzine, the counts Olsufev and Stenbok-Fermor, representatives of the entrepreneur families Vargunin, Durdin, Elisseeff, Tortonov, and scions of the liberal intelligentsia Benois, Bruni, Grimm, Dobuzhinsky, Roerich, Rimsky-Korsakov, Semenov-Tyan-Shanskii, among others. Moreover, in many cases this school educated several generations of one family. Among these, the Benois dynasty holds a unique record: 25 members of this clan studied "at May".

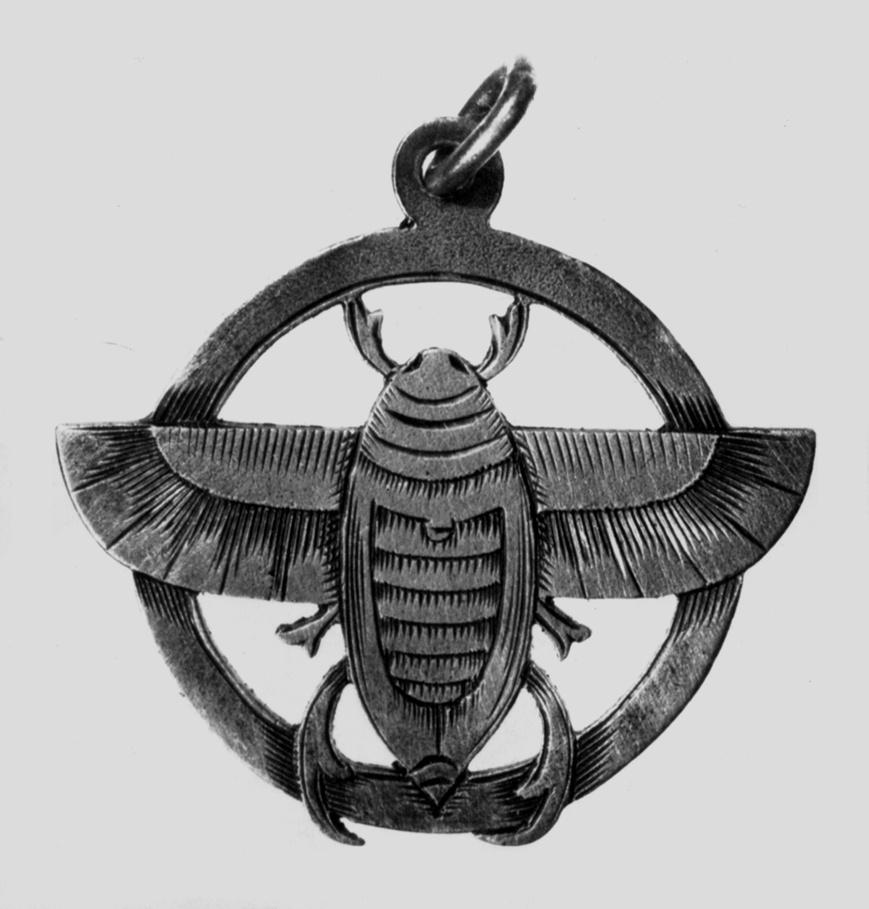
Jubilee breast pin, awarded to the graduating classes of 1906 and 1916

== Students ==
In this school, boys representing nearly all of the national diasporas of St Petersburg were educated — Russians, Germans, French, English, Tatars, Jews, Finns, Chinese, etc. In this way, as was already noted at the beginning of the 20th century, this school could in no way be called monarchical, democratic, republican, or aristocratic. It always strove to be human.

== Divisions ==
From the very beginning the school consisted of two divisions. Children who appeared inclined towards the humanities were designated Latinists and in the initial years studied in that division, later to be renamed Gymnasium. Here, along with German and French, the ancient languages Latin and Greek were taught. Gymnasium students, having studied for nine years, as a general rule prepared for the continuation of their education at university. Young people more inclined towards the natural sciences were called non-Latinists: over the course of eight years in the natural science division they acquired a great quantity of knowledge of the exact sciences and prepared for engineering work. Until 1909, a small commercial division existed in which English was studied instead of French. Thanks to this structure, in 1881 the official title of this secondary educational institution became "K. May Gymnasium and Natural Science College".

For the first 25 years the school was German, which is to say that the lessons in all subjects except Russian language, literature and history, and a few natural science disciplines were also led in the language of Goethe.

From 1861 the school was located in building no. 13 on the 10th line. The first class of the natural science division was graduated in 1863, and of the Gymnasium, in 1865. In 1890 K.I. May handed over the reins of directorship to Vasilii Aleksandrovich Krakaw (1857-1935), an 1873 May graduate, who, having graduated from the historical-philosophical faculty of the university, taught history in his former school. Under his directorship the method of teaching was perfected, the natural science division developed, and the equipment of the classrooms and laboratories improved.

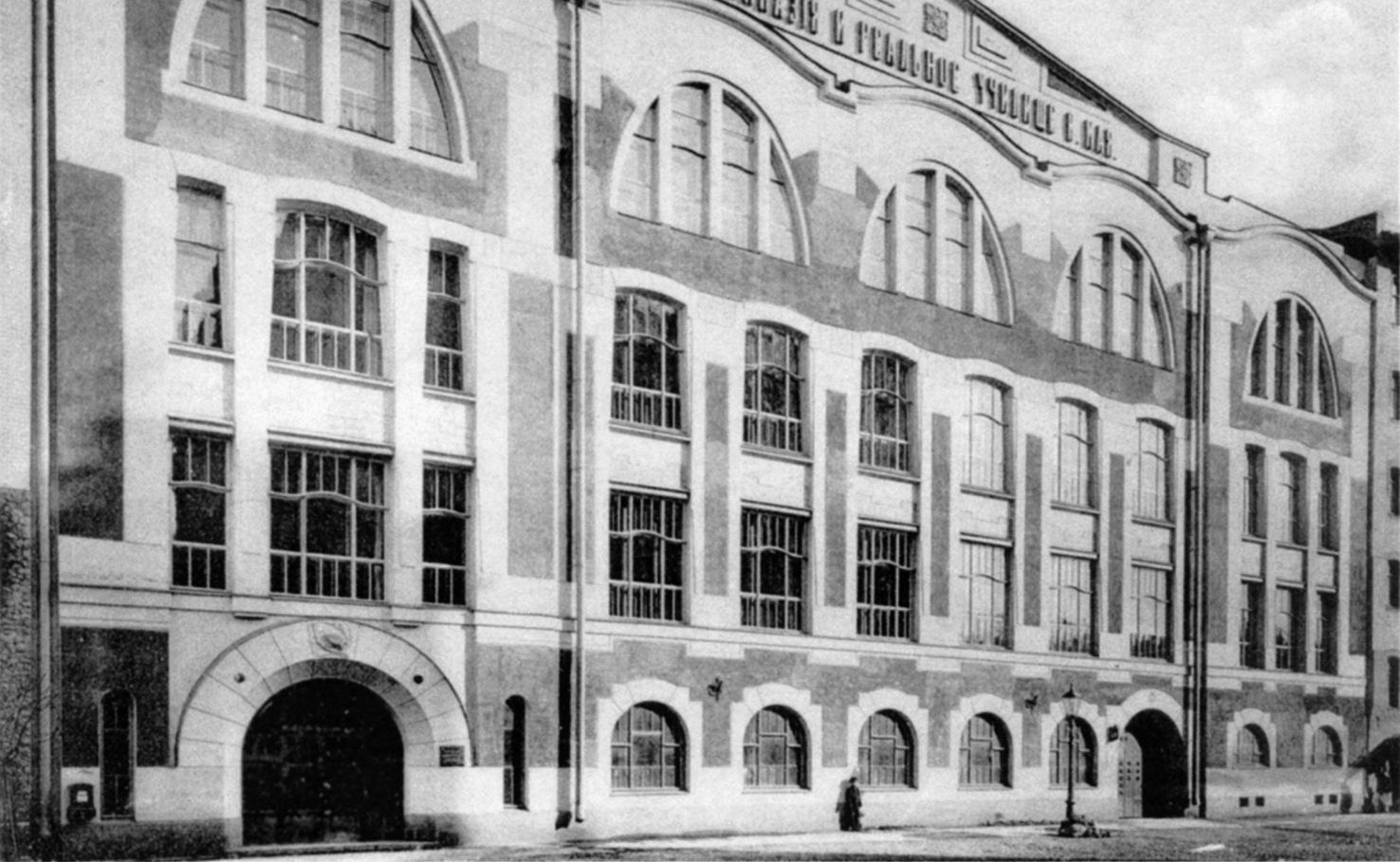
Facade view of Saint-Petersburg Karl May school, 14 line, building 39 on October 31, 1910, designed by G.D. Grimm

In 1906, after the retirement of V.A. Krakaw, the new director was a selected graduate of the historical-philosophical faculty, the magistrate of Slavic studies Aleksandr Lavrentovich Lipovsky (1867-1942). During the period of his leadership the educational institution experienced two important events. First of all, the school marked its fiftieth anniversary, and to mark the occasion published a unique jubilee collection of former students' recollections. The second event resulted from the fact that with the school's growing popularity, the space it occupied was beginning to be inadequate. In 1909 a part of building no. 39 on the 14th line was taken over, and according to the plan of master architect G.D. Grimm (an 1883 graduate), a unique new building was built with a bas-relief May bug above the arc of the entrance way. With a great concourse, the dedication took place on 31 October 1910. It was led by the bishop Gdovskii and by Benjamin Ladozhskii, the future metropolitan of Petrograd.

In four floors, along with classrooms for 650 occupants, eight beautifully equipped specific-subject classrooms were built—for physics, chemistry, natural history, history, geography, drawing, modeling, and choir (three of these had auditoriums in the form of amphitheaters); there were additionally a carpentry studio, a library numbering 12 000 books in Russian, German, French, English, Latin and Greek, a sports hall and a cafeteria.

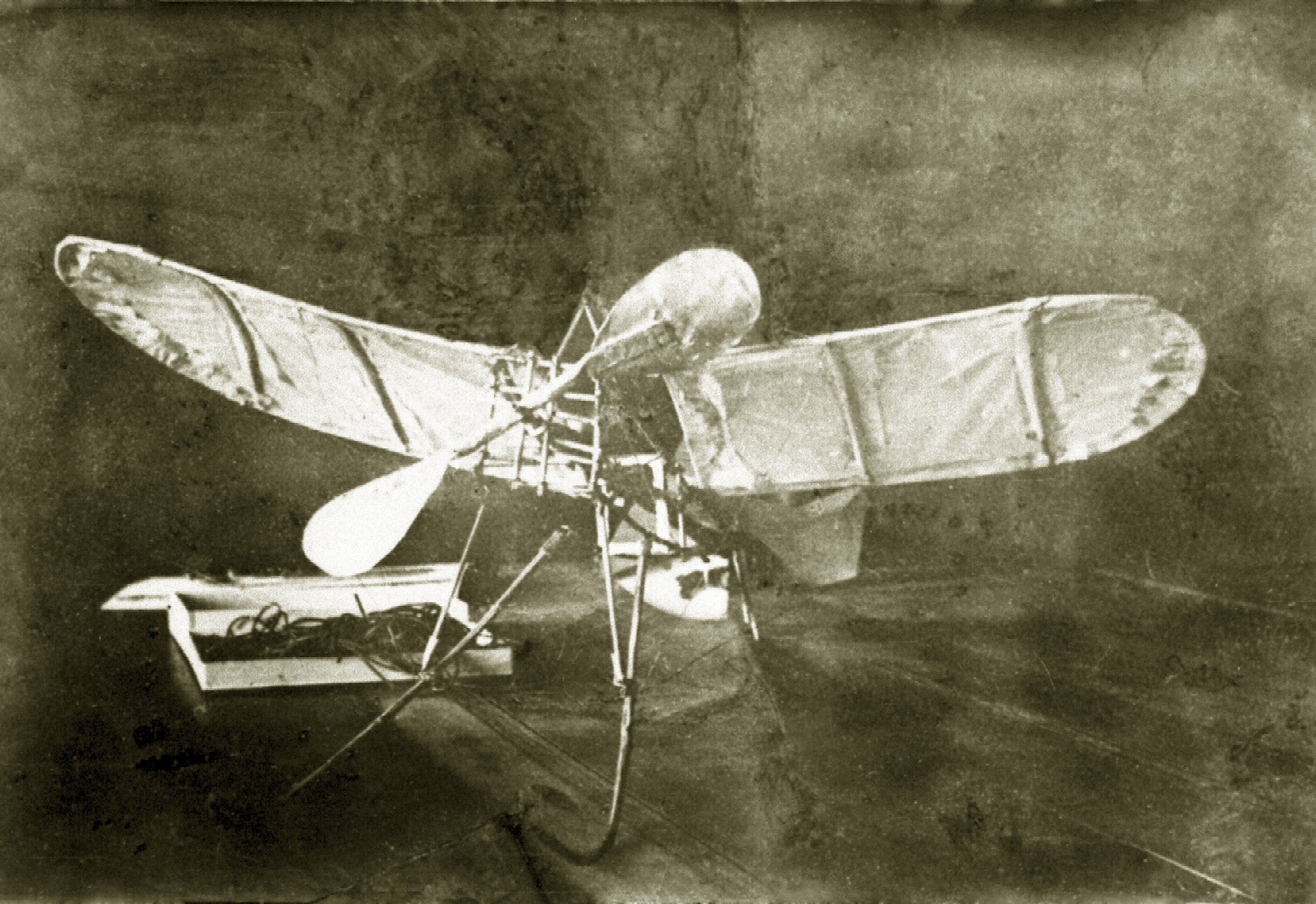
Model aircraft built by N. V. Fausek

On the eve of the First World War, under the leadership of 38 highly qualified educators, 567 young men received their education here. There were many excursions, not only to famous Petersburg museums, but also to centers of production. Various circles were active: literary (publishing a printed paper, "The May collection"), historical, maritime, photographic, sporting, and aircraft-modeling (in which N.V. Fausek, a 1913 graduate, built the first model aircraft in Russia).

After the start of the war with Germany, the Emperor Alexander I/K. May Gymnasium and Natural Science College Field Hospital was opened in the school in September 1914; all the auxiliary duties were fulfilled by the students.

In the period comprising 1910-1917 the school truly blossomed. The last (fifty-fifth) graduation took place on 24 February 1918. Since 1856 the school had educated about 3800 Petersburg youths, 1300 of whom received the attestat degree. 15% of the graduates were awarded golden medals and 17% silver medals for exceptional academic success. According to the norms of the time, "realists" were not given medals.

This piece of history was described in greater detail for the first time in the book (published 1990) The School on Vasilievskii, authored by several former "May-bugs"—academic D.S. Likhachev, school historian N.V. Blagovo, and literary theorist E. B. Belodubrovskii. To mark the 150th anniversary of the school, celebrated in 2006, N.V. Blagovo has published a second, extended edition of this book.

== 20th century ==
In autumn 1918, the private educational institution of K.I. May was nationalized and turned into the Soviet United Labor School, 1st and 2nd degree. Here, according to the decrees of the new authorities, co-education was introduced, while grades and the attestat degree were abolished. Later the brigade-laboratory method of study was introduced and utilized until 1932.

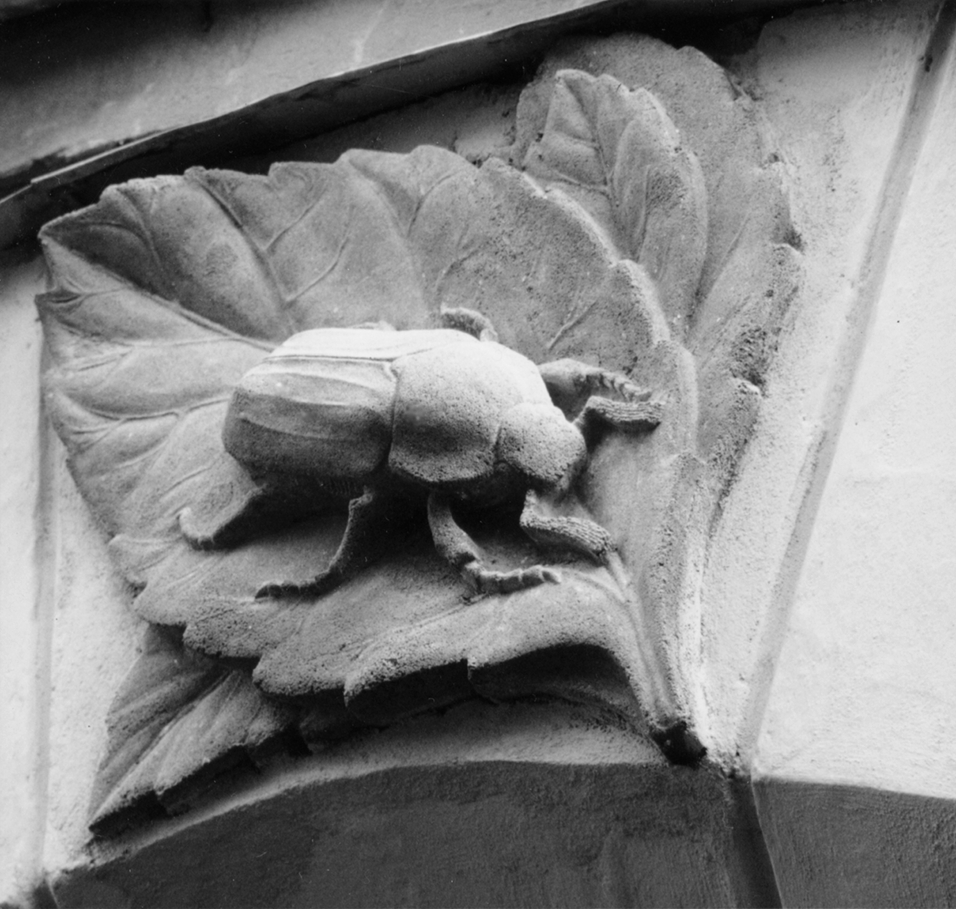
May-bug as bas-relief on Saint-Petersburg Karl May school, Vasilievskiy island, 14 line, building 39. The bas-relief was rebuilt in 1995

In the pre-war years the director of the school, its name and number (15, 12, 217, 17), the length of study (seven, nine, or ten years) changed repeatedly (see appendix 2). The "May" pedagogical traditions were in one way or another preserved until the winter of 1929, when as a result of an extensive anti-bourgeois press campaign and the publication of unfounded accusations in the newspaper "Leningrad Pravda," from 15 January 1929 the school's educators and management were largely replaced—even the bas-relief above the entranceway was destroyed. In the beginning of the 1930s, K.I. Polyakov (1902-1946) became director of the school and recreated a good pedagogical collective; the life of the school was put to rights. The physical education instructor R.V. Ozol', organizer of the "Spartak" circle, was an especially bright figure at this time. Pioneer and Komsomol organizations were also created.

Starting in the fall of 1937, in accordance with government resolution, the school also housed the 6th Special Artillery School (6 SAS), formed on a volunteer basis of students from the 8-10th classes of this and other nearby general education schools. Between 1938 and 1941 the 6 SAS graduated four classes. On 5 February 1942, during the cruel winter of the blockade, starving schoolchildren were evacuated to Tobolskt—nevertheless, 63 of them died of hunger on the way. Graduates of the 6 SAS distinguished themselves brilliantly on the fronts of the World War II, defended and liberated their native Leningrad, stormed Berlin and the Reichstag; 111 of them died courageously. Since 1984 in the current School no. 5 (13th line, no. 28) there has been a museum devoted to the 6 SAS, founded thanks to the efforts both of the school director at that time and of the current museum director L.V. Chernenkova. The museum directs the students in active patriotic work, with the aid of veterans, led by General-major V.G. Rozhkov.

After the lifting of the Leningrad blockade, from September 1944, lessons were begun again, only now the educational institution was called the Men's High School no. 5 (and from 1954, with the institution of co-education, simply High School no. 5). In 1966, on the initiative of the director of studies A.S. Baturina, a museum was created in the school. Along with the expositions devoted to the labor and military works of former students, there was a stand devoted to the pre-revolutionary period and the school's first director, K.I. May. However, this museum did not exist for very long, and, sadly, almost none of its exhibits were preserved.

In connection with a collapse of ceiling plaster in 1976 (requiring a renovation), the collective of educators and students were temporarily moved to another building on the 13th line (no. 28). The renovation was not completed due to lack of funds, and school activities were not reinstated in the old building. All the unique classroom equipment, the furniture, memorial plaques with the names of former graduates of various years, busts of writers and scholars, and the decorated interiors were left to the whims of fate. All of it was quickly plundered and irretrievably lost.

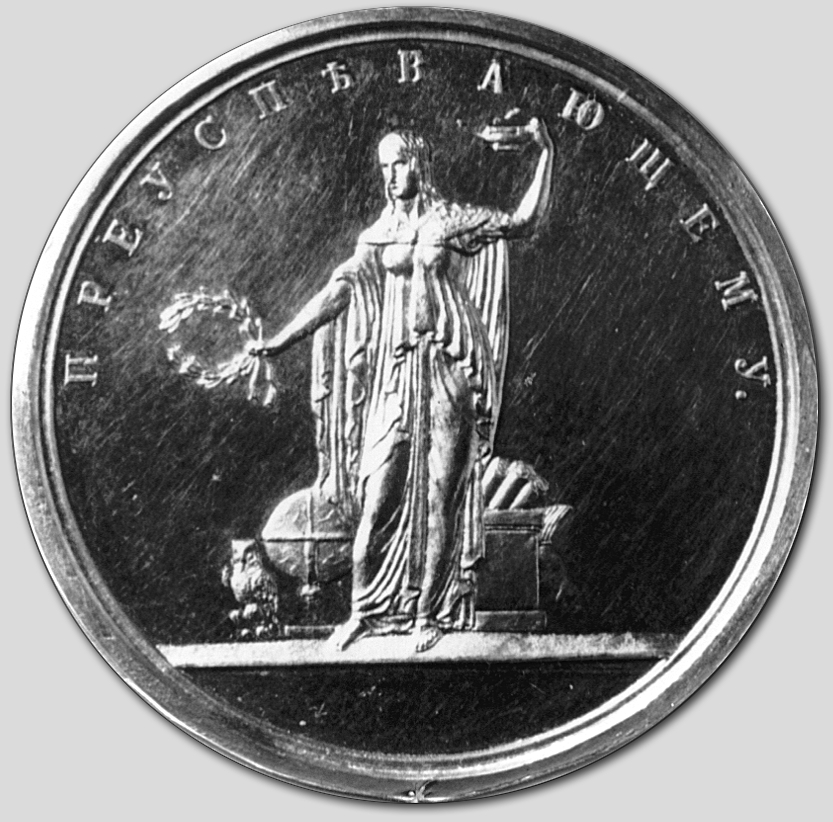
Face side of golden medal, awarded to graduates until 1918. Inscription: "To the successful"

Graduates of the school achieved great successes in various branches of science and culture. More than 100 of them became Doctors of Science, 29 were elected active members or member-correspondents of the Academy of Science or the Academy of the Arts (see list below). Among other former students: three members of the State council of pre-revolutionary Russia—University rector D.D. Grimm, Petersburg governor A.D. Zinov'ev and Minister of Internal Affairs, later Minister of Justice A.A. Makarov; Minister of Internal Affairs D.S. Sipyagin; University rector E.D. Grimm; Technological Institute rector N.A. Bartels; military leaders—infantry general N.A. Epanchin; general-majors S.V. Belov, V.V. Volkov, V.G. Rozhkov; vice-admiral E.I. Volobuyev; contra-admirals V.A. Petrovskii, P.V. Rimskii-Korsakov, I.V. Kossovich; cultural figures—members of the association "The World of art" A.N. Benois, N.K. Roerich, V.A. Serov, K.A. Somov, A.E. Yakovlev, as well as O.G. Vereysky, P. Ya. Pavlinov, I.A. Puni, S. N. Roerich, the sculptor B.E. Kaplyanskii, the composers V.I. Tsytovich, F.D. Shevtsov, the writers G.I. Alekseev, V.S. Golovinskii, V.A. Knekht, A.A. Liverovskii, V.V. Uspenskii, L.V. Uspenskii, O.A. Khazin, F.K. Einbaum, the poet Yu. A. Liverovskii, the theatre figures F. N. Kurikhin, P.P. Podervyanskii, and M.F. Stronin. Two-time Hero of the Soviet Union, doctor of physics and mathematics, cosmonaut and former May student G.M. Grechko also warmly remembered the school. We should also mention that O.D. Khvolson was one of the first to be given (in 1926) the title "Hero of labor", and that three graduates—V.V. Volkov, D.S. Likhachev, and V.V. Novozhilov—were distinguished with the title "Hero of socialist labor". Five other graduates—V.V. Belomorets, M.A. Elyashevich, L.L. Kerber, V.D. Nalivkin, and V.V. Novozhilov—became laureates of the Lenin Prize.

From 1978 to the present day, the former school building has been occupied by the St. Petersburg Institute of Information Technology and Automation of the Russian Academy of Sciences. The director of the Institute, Professor-Emeritus of science and technology of the Russian Federation and doctor of technological sciences, member-correspondents of the Academy of Science R.M. Yusupov, with the active support of T.I. Golubeva, then head of Administration of Education and Culture of the Vasilievskii district—in 1994 made the decision to create a museum of the history of the K.I. May School.

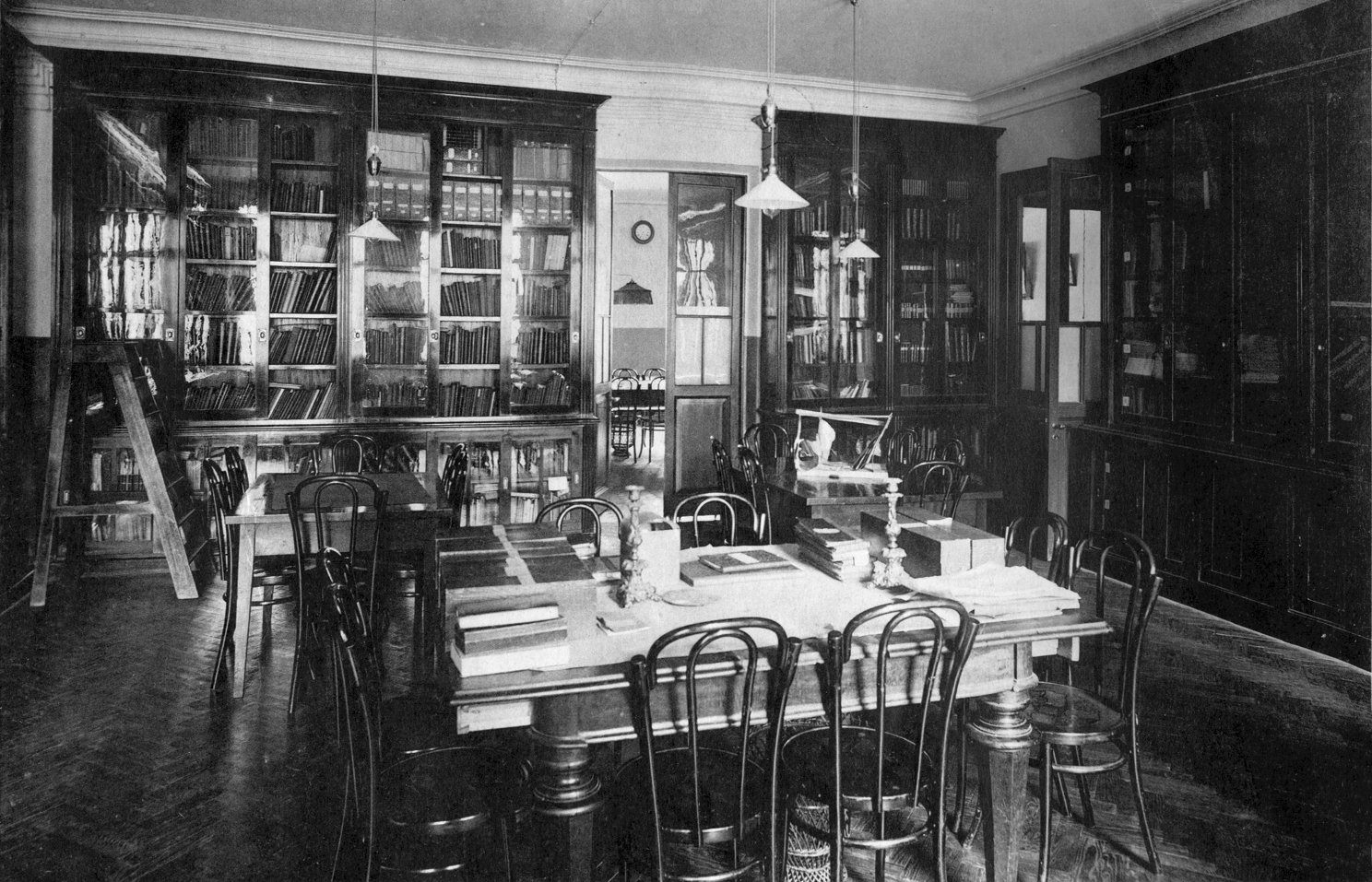
Library in Museum of the history of the K. May school

On a clear cool day, 12 May 1995, the oldest living student, the academic D.S. Likhachev unveiled a memorial plaque—the bas-relief of a May bug, recreated by the museum and the sculptor S.N. Smirnov. After two days one more plaque appeared on the building, immortalizing the memory of the presence of the 6th Special Artillery School. The museum, which is located in the former hall of the school's educational council, boasts an exhibit of 15 showcases and 25 stands, reflecting all of the founding stages of the school's 150-year history.

In the following years the museum tripled in size, and its archives now contain more than 4000 preserved items: objects, documents, photographs, audio- and videocassettes. For the museum's 10-year anniversary, in 2005, the N.K. Rerikh Art School donated a bust of K.I. May, sculpted by I.V. Volle. During this period about 500 groups—consisting of schoolchildren, educators, scholars, representatives of various associations, ordinary residents of Petersburg and other Russian cities, as well as guests from Linz, London, New York City, Paris, Seoul, Sofia, Turin, Ulaanbaatar and even Sydney and Brisbane were introduced to the history of the school and left grateful messages in the visitor's book.

== Educational principles ==
- First love, then teach.
- The main task of the instructor is to prepare the youth for work that is useful to society.
- Give the students true knowledge, as it alone has immutable meaning and true strength.
- There may be different methods, but education and upbringing must in any case remain the final aim of all teaching.
- Everyone should not be reduced to one level; one should work intelligently, adapting to the features of each individual personality and the degree of development of the students and teachers.
- The mind, moral qualities, aesthetic sense, will, and health of the student should all concern the teacher to an equal degree.
- Value not bare information, but rather internal enlightenment, a feeling for truth, and strength of will.
- Practical exercises are truly fruitful when they demand of the students independence, and when the knowledge itself is adapted to their strengths.
- One must demand of the students only that which they are capable of achieving and that which does not exceed the ability either of the class or of the individual student.
- The example of the teacher is the most effective means of education.
- Discipline alone is not education.
- The aim of education is not to break the child's will, but to form it.
- A young being can succeed in everything if he is trusted.
- Enthusiasm for and diligence in certain activities deserve encouragement, but careless lagging-behind can lead to apathy in the student.
- Punishment is effective only when it is understood by the accused and completely corresponds in degree to the severity of the misdeed.
- The family, the school and the church are the three forces that educate humankind.

== Chronicle of the school's development ==
1856	In building no.56, 1st line, V.O., on 10 September, a private men's school is opened
1861	The school moves to the 10th line, no. 13
1863	The first graduating class of the natural science division
1865	The first graduating class of the Gymnasium division
1881	The school marks its 25th anniversary
1882	The school is granted the rights of an educational institution by the Ministry of Public Education. Instruction in Russian is introduced
1890	K.I. May retires, but continues his activities as an honorary administrator. V.A. Krakau is confirmed as director
1895	K.I. May dies 20 March. A scholarship is established in his name
1906	V.A. Krakau retires. A.L. Lipovskii is chosen as director. The school marks its 50th anniversary
1910	30 October the school moves to its new address: 14th line, no. 39
1912	The school hosts Russia's first model-aircraft circle; the literary magazine "The May Collection" is issued
1914	The K. May Gymnasium and Natural Science College/Emperor Aleksandr I Memorial Field Hospital is opened
1918	The final, 55th class graduates from the K. May School. The school is nationalized 16 October and receives the title - Soviet United Labor School, I. and II. Levels. Co-education is introduced.
1920	A.L. Lipovskii is freed from his position as director of the school
1934	10-year length of study is introduced
1937	The 6th Special Artillery School (SAS) is founded, on the basis of the 8-10th general education classes
1938	First graduation of the 6 SAS
1942	6 SAS evacuated to Tobolsk
1944	The 5th Men's Secondary School is opened
1948	First post-war graduation
1954	Co-education is established
1962	The school changes to incomplete secondary level (eight-year)
1966	The director of academics of the school, A.S. Baturina, opens a museum
1967	10-year education (re-) established
1974	The school once again changes to incomplete secondary
1976	School no. 5 moves to the 13th line, no. 28
1978	SPIIRAN moves into the old building (14th line, no. 39)
1984	Museum of the 6th SAS opens in School no.5
1990	The book "The School on Valisievskii" is published
1995	Two memorial plaques are placed on building no.39, 14th line. The Museum of the History of the K. May School is opened
1999	Eleven-year education is introduced in School no. 5
2001	First graduation of two eleven-year classes
2005	The book "The School on Valisievskii (part I) 1856-1918" is published

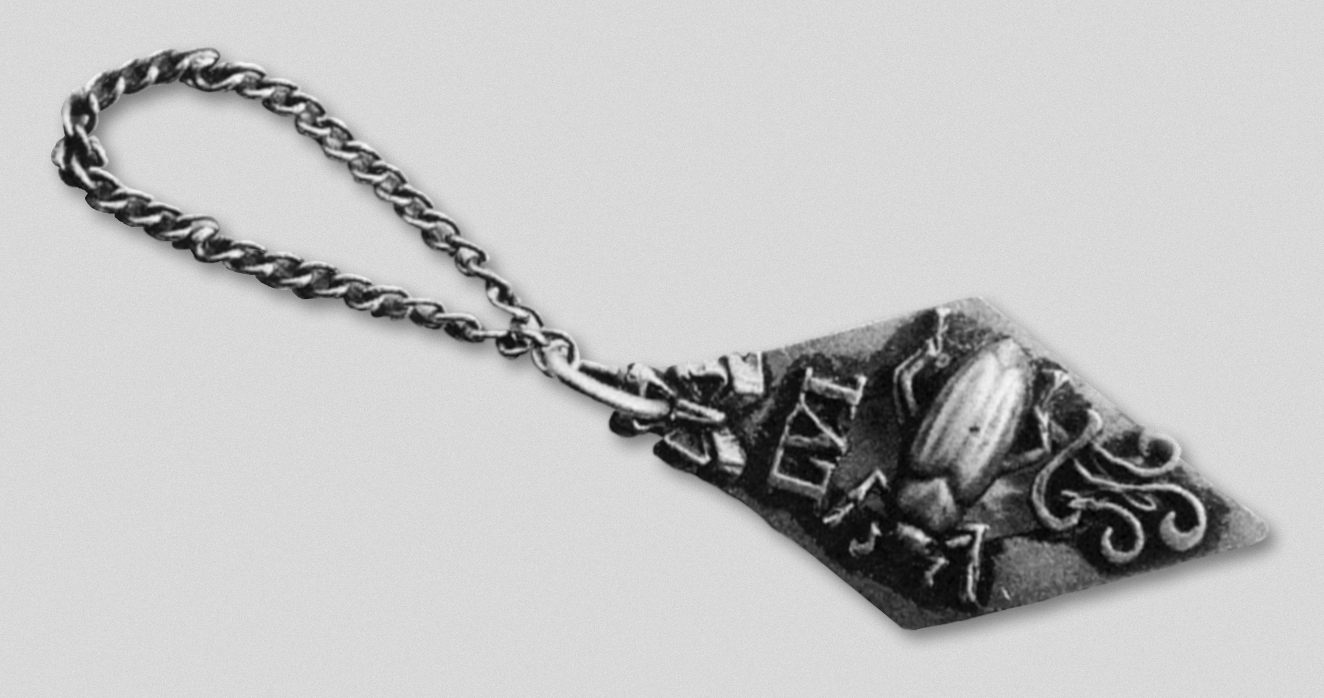
Breast pin, awarded to the graduating classes of 1919

== Notable alumni ==
The pride and glory of the school. Active members and members-correspondent of the Academy of Sciences and the Academy of Arts

	Name (last, first, patronymic)	Years of birth and death	Title	Year of election
1.	Benois N.A.	1901—1988	honorary member AA USSR	1966
2.	Benois Yu.Yu.	1852—1929	academy of architecture	1885
3.	Bruni A.A.	1860—1911	academy of architecture	1891
4.	Bruni N.A.	1856—1935	academy of architecture	1906
5.	Bublichenko N.L.	1899—1990	member-correspondent AS Kazakh SSR	1958
6.	Vereiskii O.G.	1915—1993	active member AA USSR	1983
7.	Gorbunov N.P.	1892—1937	active member AS USSR	1935
8.	Grimm G.D.	1865—1942	academy of architecture	1895
9.	Günther N.M.	1871—1941	member-correspondent AS USSR	1924
10.	El'yashevich M.A.	1908—1996	active member AS Beloruss. SSR	1956
11.	Zavarzin A.A.	1886—1945	active member AS USSR	1943
12.	Kas'yanov V.L.	р. 1940	active member of RAS	2000
13.	Kachalov N.N.	1883—1961	member-correspondent AS USSR	1933
14.	Lenyashin V.A.	р. 1940	active member AA USSR	1988
15.	Likhachev D.S.	1906—1999	active member AS USSR	1970
16.	Maksimov A.A.	1875—1928	member-correspondent Russian AS	1920
17.	Nalivkin V.D.	1915—2000	member-correspondent AS USSR	1968
18.	Novozhilov V.V.	1910—1987	active member AS USSR	1966
19.	Ol' A.A.	1883—1958	member-correspondent AA USSR	1941
20.	Roerich N.K.	1874—1947	active member AA	1909
21.	Roerich S.N.	1904—1993	honorary member AA USSR	1978
22.	Serov V.A.	1865—1911	active member AA	1903
23.	Vasmer M.Yu.	1886—1962	foreign member AS USSR	1929
24.	Fasmer R.R.	1888-1938	member-correspondent AA USSR	1979
25.	Fomin I.I.	1904—1989	member-correspondent AA USSR	1929
26.	Frenkel' Ya.I.	1904—1952	member-correspondent AS USSR	1950
27.	Fursenko A.V.	1903—1975	member-correspondent AS Beloruss. SSR	1895
28.	Khvolson O.D.	1852—1934	member-correspondent St. Petersburg AS,	1895
			honorary member Russian AS	1920
29.	Shildknekht N.A..	1857—1918	academy of architecture	1885

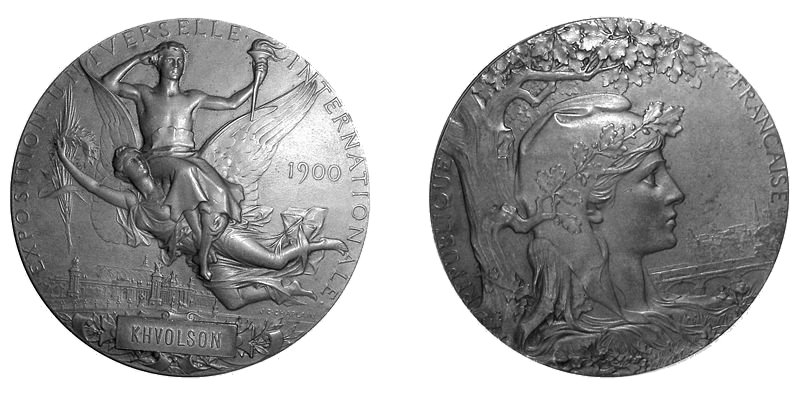
Medal of O.D. Khvolson, awarded him at the Universal Exhibition in Paris, 1900

== See also ==
- St. Petersburg Institute of Information Technology and Automation, of the Russian Academy of Sciences (in Russian)
