= Abraham Hazzan =

Abraham ben Judah Ḥazzan (fl. 16th century) was a cantor and Biblical commentator in Kremenetz, Volhynia, Polish–Lithuanian Commonwealth (now Ukraine).

== Commentary ==
In 1595, after recovering from a severe illness, he began compiling material for a aggadic commentary on the Nevi'im and Ketuvim. His work included a Judeo-German translation of difficult passages. The material he used was collected from his teachers and from his study of Rashi, Redag, Ralbag, Abraham ibn Ezra, and the Midrashim. In his exegesis, Ḥazzan adhered closely to the biblical text.

He temporarily halted his work upon learning of the 1593 publication in Kraków of Naphtali Hirsch Altschuler's Ayyalah Sheluḥah. Finding that Altschuler's work differed in approach from his own, he resumed his project with the encouragement of Rabbi Samson of Kremenetz and completed it in the spring of 1597. To avoid competing with Altschuler's publication, Ḥazzan did not release his commentary during his lifetime. His compilation, entitled Ḥibbure Leket ('A Miscellaneous Collection'), was posthumously printed in Lublin by Ẓebi ben Kalonymus Jafe in 1611–12.

Existing copies of Ḥibbure Leket are held by several institutions: the Oppenheim Library possesses one copy; the British Museum holds two copies, one complete and one incomplete; and Chwolson's library contained another copy.
