= Viktor Novozhilov =

Viktor Novozhilov may refer to:

- Viktor Novozhilov (wrestler)
- Viktor Novozhilov (general)
- Viktor Novozhilov (politician)
- Viktor Valentinovich Novozhilov, Soviet economist and mathematician
