= Khvolʹson (crater) =

Crater on the Moon

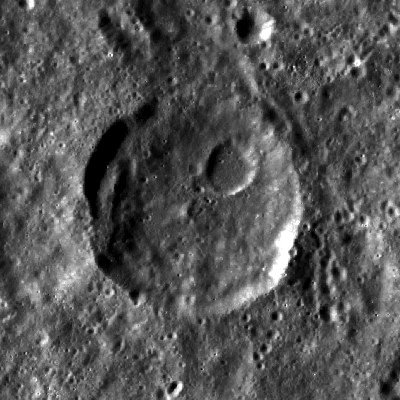
- LRO image
- Coordinates: 13.8°S 111.4°E
- Diameter: 54 km
- Depth: Unknown
- Colongitude: 249° at sunrise
- Eponym: Orest D. Khvolʹson

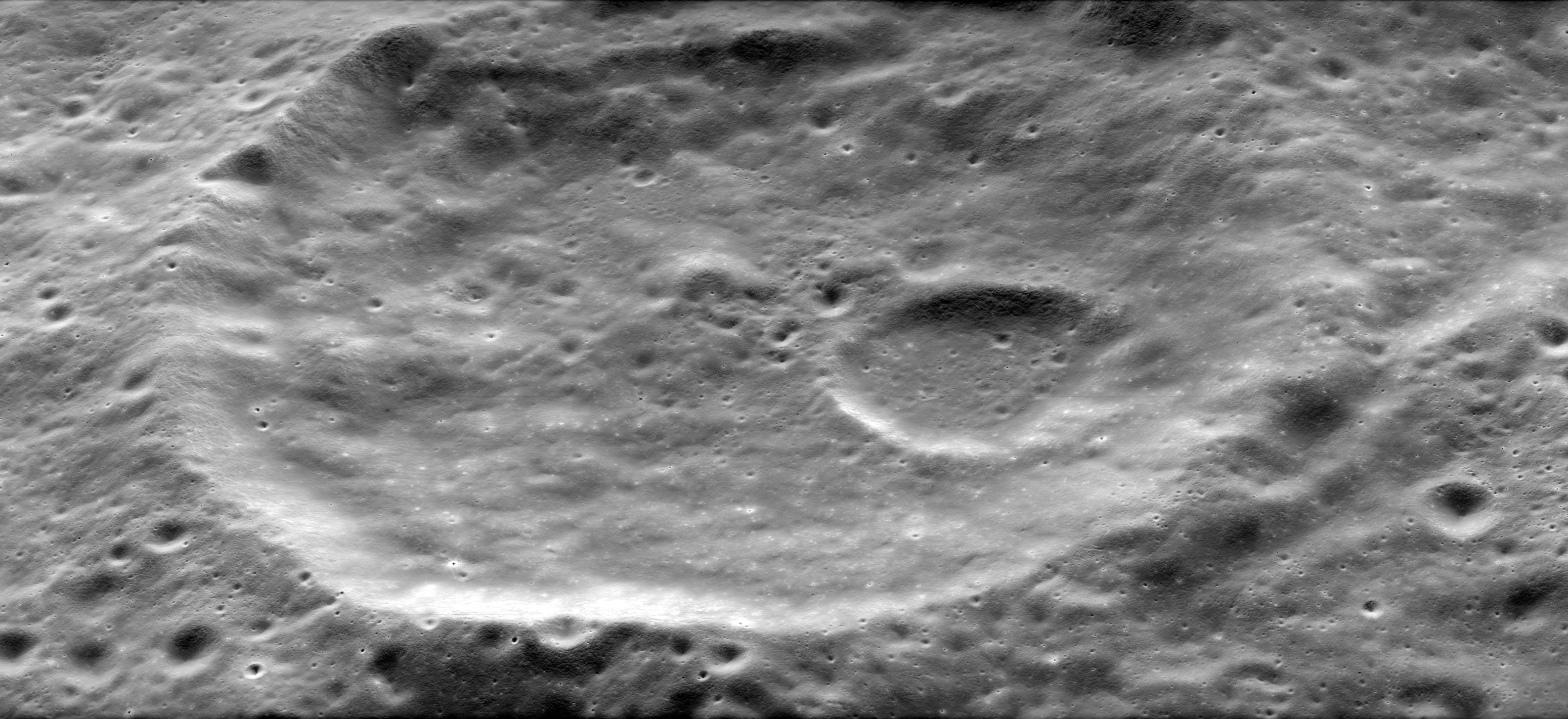
Oblique view from Apollo 17

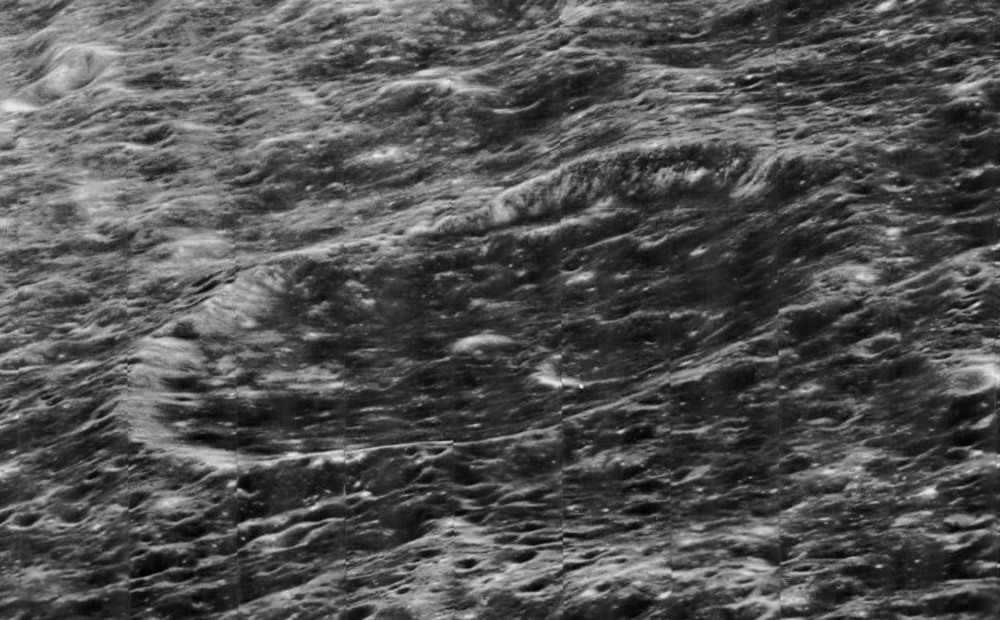
Oblique Lunar Orbiter 1 image

Khvolʹson is a crater on the far side of the Moon. It lies just to the east-southeast of the large walled plain Pasteur. Less than a crater diameter to the north-northeast of Khvolʹson is the crater Meitner, and just to the east-southeast lies Kondratyuk.

This crater has a roughly circular outer rim that is not overlaid by any impacts of significance. The inner walls appear as simple slopes down to the interior floor. Within the crater is a small crater in the northeastern quadrant of the floor. The interior is otherwise marked only by a few tiny craterlets and some irregularities.

== Satellite craters ==
By convention these features are identified on lunar maps by placing the letter on the side of the crater midpoint that is closest to Khvolʹson.

Khvolʹson	Latitude	Longitude	Diameter
C	13.5° S	111.9° E	15 km
