= Yosef Vanunu =

Israeli politician and criminal (born 1945)

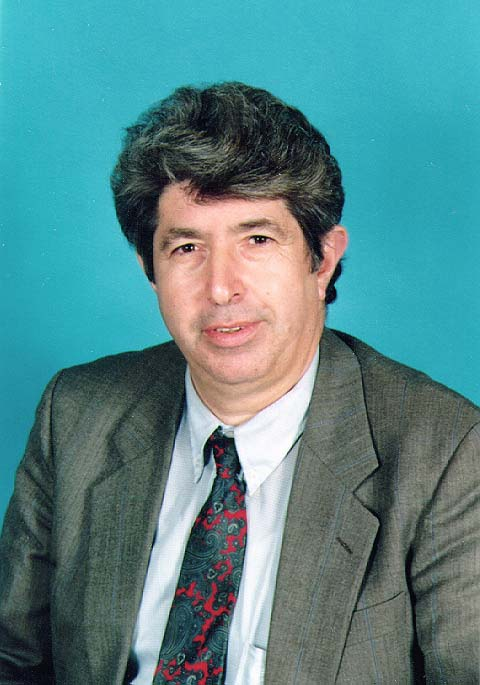
- Vanunu in the 1990s

Faction represented in the Knesset
- 1992–1996: Labor Party

Personal details
- Born: 7 August 1945 (age 81) El Kelaa, Morocco

Yosef Vanunu (Hebrew: יוסף ונונו; born 7 August 1945) is an Israeli economist and former politician who served as a member of the Knesset for the Labor Party from 1992 until 1996.

== Biography ==
Born in El Kelaa des Sraghna, Morocco in 1945, Vanunu's father was a prominent rabbi. He made aliyah to Israel in 1955 and initially lived in moshav Gefen, before moving to Kiryat Malakhi in 1957, where his father built the town's first synagogue.

He studied for a BA in economics and agriculture at the Hebrew University of Jerusalem, before receiving a PhD in economics from Bar-Ilan University. He worked as an economist and was a member of the Histadrut council.

He was elected mayor of Kiryat Malakhi local council in 1981 on the Herut list, and was re-elected twice, the second time as an independent. He also chaired the audit committee of the Local Government Centre. He later switched to the Labor Party, becoming a member of its central committee and comptroller unit. He was elected to the Knesset on the Labor Party list in 1992, but lost his seat in the 1996 elections.

On 6 July 1997 he was convicted at Beersheba magistrates court of bribery, fraud and breach of trust relating to acts committed in 1989 whilst mayor of Kiryat Malakhi. He was sentenced to twelve months in prison, although six months was suspended and the other served as community service, and was also fined 40,000 shekels. His appeal to the Supreme Court was turned down.

== See also ==
- List of Israeli public officials convicted of crimes or misdemeanors
