= Shmuel Rechtman =

Israeli politician (1924–1988)

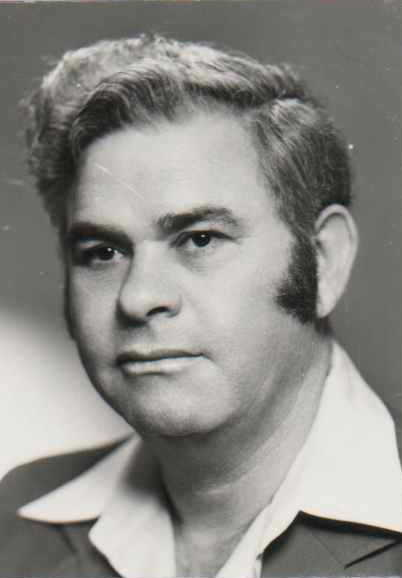
- Rechtman in the 1970s

Faction represented in the Knesset
- 1977–1979: Likud

Personal details
- Born: 28 February 1924 Rehovot, Mandatory Palestine
- Died: 23 July 1988 (aged 64)

Shmuel Rechtman (Hebrew: שמואל רכטמן; 28 February 1924 – 23 July 1988) was an Israeli politician who served as mayor of Rehovot from 1970 until 1979, and as a member of the Knesset for Likud between 1977 and 1979.

== Biography ==
Born in Rehovot during the Mandate era, Rechtman worked as the administrative director of the Kfar Silver agricultural high school.

He joined the General Zionists in 1949 and was one of the heads of the Liberal Workers Union. After the General Zionists merged into the Liberal Party in 1961, Rechtman became chairman of the party's national council. He was elected to the Rehovot city council in 1965, and in 1970 he became mayor.

In 1976 he became a member of the Likud directorate (the party was then an alliance of the Liberal Party, Herut and other right-wing parties), and was also chairman of the Likud bloc in the Histadrut trade union. He was elected to the Knesset on the Likud list in 1977. However, early in the Knesset session he was charged with taking bribes from a building contractor. Following a vote held by Rechtman's consent, his parliamentary immunity was withdrawn. In January 1978 he was found guilty and sentenced to three and a half years in prison. He appealed to the Supreme Court, and continued in the Knesset until his appeal was dismissed. He resigned his seat on 18 June 1979, and was replaced by David Stern. He also stepped down as mayor of Rehovot and left the Likud directorate. He was later imprisoned, becoming the first member of the Knesset to be jailed.

Rechtman died on 23 July 1988.

== See also ==
- List of Israeli public officials convicted of crimes or misdemeanors
