= David Stern (Israeli politician) =

Israeli businessman and politician (1910–2003)

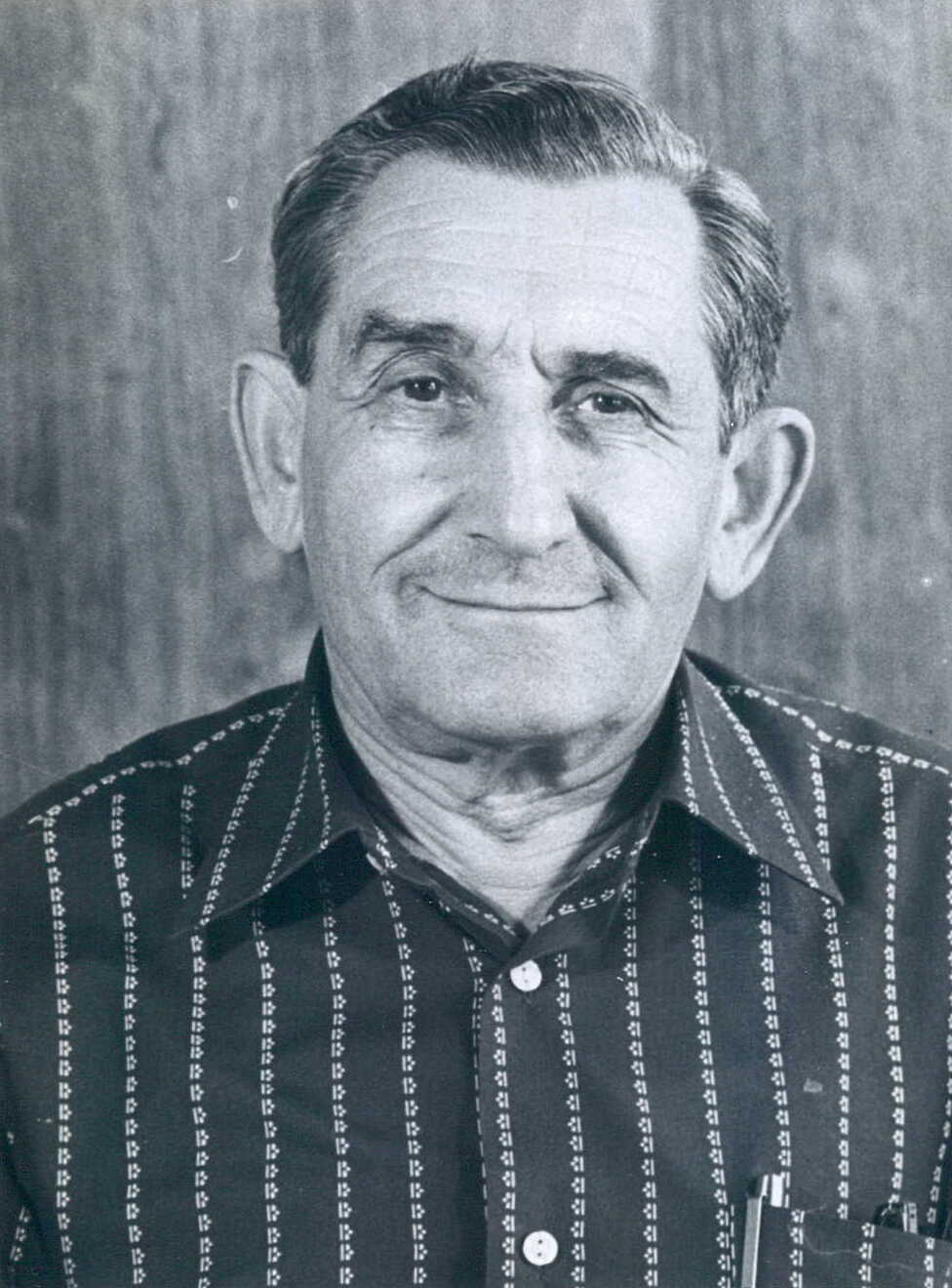
- Stern during his time in the Knesset

Faction represented in the Knesset
- 1979–1981: Likud

Personal details
- Born: 29 March 1910 Suwałki, Russian Empire
- Died: 13 February 2003 (aged 92)

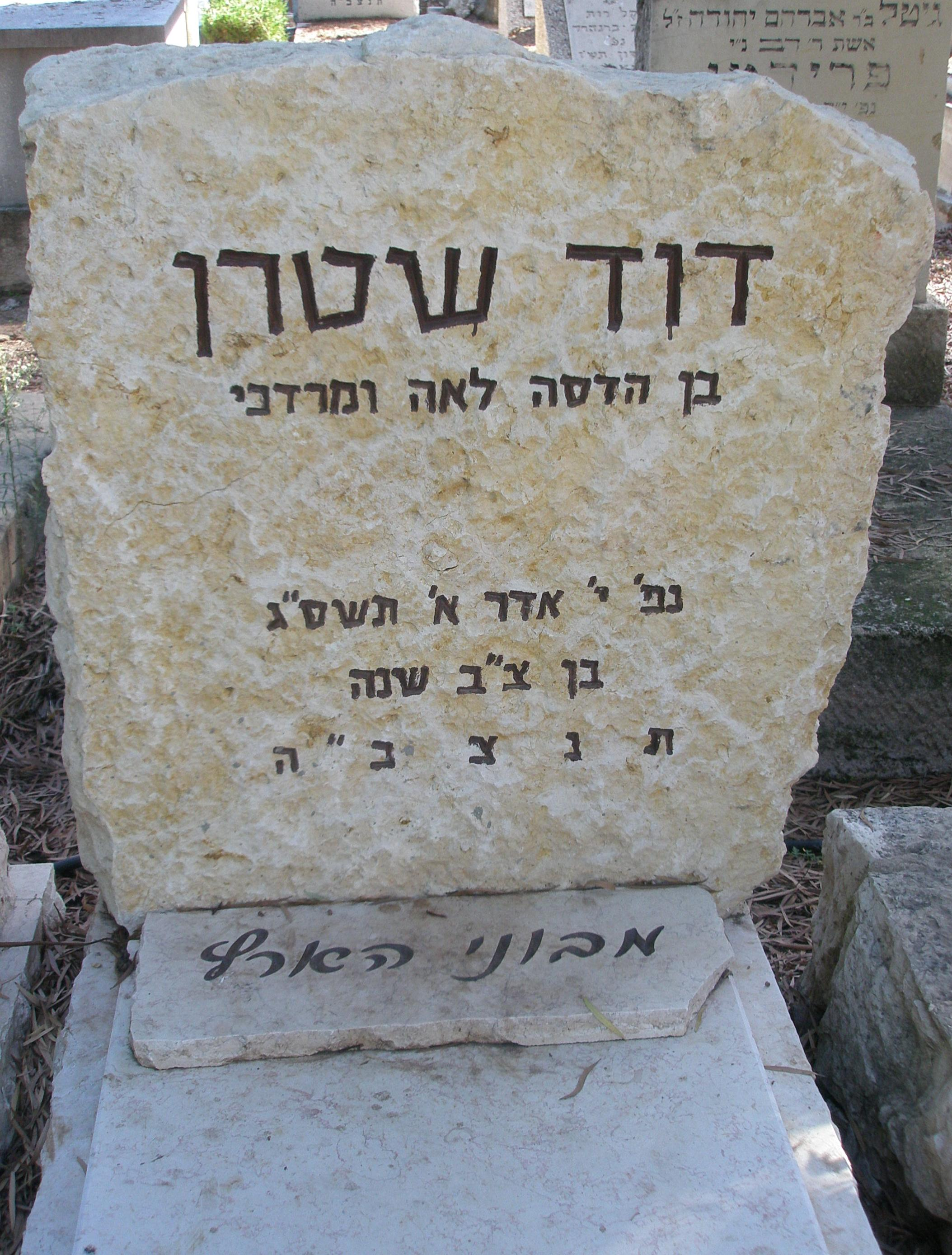
Stern's grave in the Nahlat Yitzhak cemetery

David Stern (Hebrew: דוד שטרן; 29 March 1910 – 13 February 2003) was an Israeli businessman and politician who served as a member of the Knesset for Likud between 1979 and 1981.

== Biography ==
Stern was born in Suwałki in the Russian Empire (today in Poland) in 1910. During World War I, his mother fled the Germans with him and his brother, Avraham, and found refuge with her sister in Russia. Stern studied engineering in Brno in Czechoslovakia. He emigrated to Mandatory Palestine in 1935, and became a member of Lehi, of which Avraham was the leader. He worked as a building contractor, and was president of the Building Contractors Association.

A member of the Herut central committee, he became a member of Tel Aviv city council in 1969. He was forty-fourth on the Likud list (an alliance of Herut and other right-wing parties) for the 1977 elections, and although Likud only won 43 seats, he entered the Knesset on 18 June 1979 as a replacement for Shmuel Rechtman, who had resigned after failing in an appeal against a conviction for bribery. Placed fifty-fourth on the Likud list for the 1981 elections, Likud won 48 seats and Stern lost his seat in the Knesset.

He died in 2003 at the age of 92.
