= Shlomo Dayan =

Israeli rabbi and former politician

- שלמה דיין
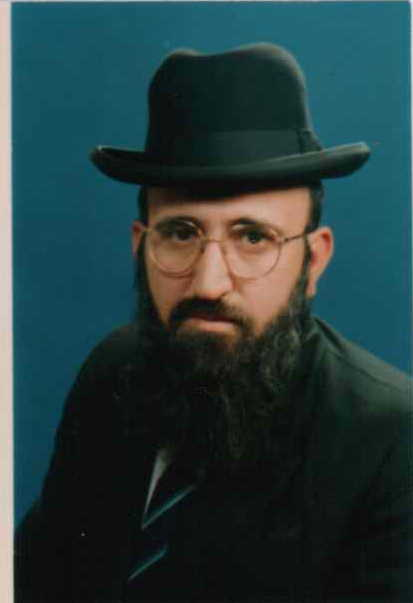
- Dayan during his time in the Knessey

Faction represented in the Knesset
- 1988–1992: Shas

Personal details
- Born: 6 November 1952 (age 72); Tétouan, Morocco

Shlomo Dayan (Hebrew: שלמה דיין; born 6 November 1952) is an Israeli rabbi and former politician.

== Biography ==
Born in Tétouan, Morocco in 1952, Dayan emigrated to Israel in 1962. He studied at the Sha'arit Yosef yeshiva in Be'er Ya'akov and was certified as a rabbi.

He joined Shas in the 1980s and served as a member of Jerusalem city council and deputy chairman of the city's Religious Council between 1983 and 1988. From 1985 until 1987 he chaired the party's Organisation Committee, and in 1988 was elected to the Knesset on the party's list. He was appointed a Deputy Speaker and sat on several committees until losing his seat in the 1992 elections.

In 2008 Dayan was convicted of fraud and forgery and sentenced to four months of community service.

== See also ==
- List of Israeli public officials convicted of crimes or misdemeanors
