= Shmuel Flatto-Sharon =

Israeli politician (1930–2018)

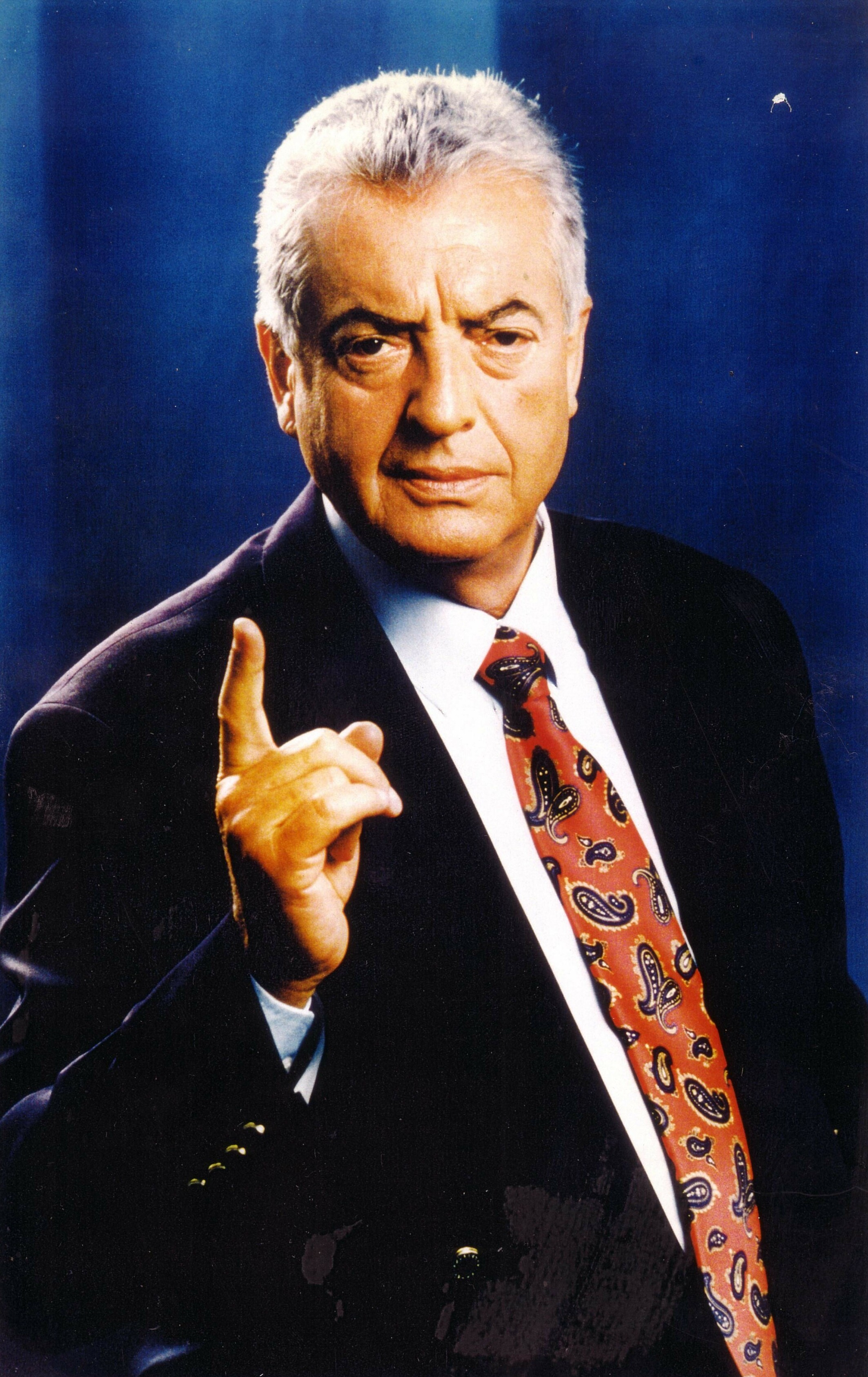

Faction represented in the Knesset
- 1977–1981: Development and Peace

Personal details
- Born: 18 January 1930 Łódź, Poland
- Died: 7 December 2018 (aged 88) Ramat Gan, Israel

Shmuel "Samy" Flatto-Sharon (Hebrew: שמואל פלאטו-שרון; 18 January 1930 – 7 December 2018) was a controversial French-Israeli businessman, radio talk-show host and politician. After starting his own political party, he was a member of the Knesset between 1977 and 1981.

== Biography ==
Flatto-Sharon was born as Shmuel Sheibitz to a Jewish family in Łódź, Poland, in 1930. His family escaped to France after the German invasion of Poland, with Shmuel disguised as a girl. Forty members of his family, including his father, were murdered in the Holocaust. He attended high school in Paris and Strasbourg, and joined the Young Communist League in 1945.

At age 14, he began selling cigarettes to soldiers and students, and then entered the recycling business, making a fortune in the recycling of paper, rags, and scrap metal. At age 21, he entered the real estate business. Throughout his 20s, he built up his business empire. He came to own a transport service for hauling merchandise with dozens of trucks, industrial plants, a chain of restaurants and cafes, and hotels. By the late 1960s, he owned dozens of companies throughout Europe, the United States, and South America, and did business in oil, logging, and precious metals in Africa. He was involved in large projects in major cities throughout the world, including Paris, New York City, Rio de Jainero, Caracas, and Tel Aviv.

== Emigration to Israel ==
In 1972, he moved to Israel, fleeing the French authorities who sought to arrest him for embezzling $60 million. He bought a villa in Savyon and immediately launched a business career in Israel. He entered into a partnership with Israeli businessman Avraham Pilz, with whom he established the Dizengoff Center, Israel's first shopping mall.

== Israeli political career ==
Despite barely speaking Hebrew, in 1977 he formed a one-man party, also named Flatto-Sharon, to run in the Knesset elections that year, hoping to obtain parliamentary immunity to avoid extradition to France.

The list won 2% of the vote, enough for two seats. However, as it was a one-man list, only one seat was taken. It has been suggested that the surprising level of support that the party won was a response to France's refusal to extradite Abu Daoud, who was wanted in Israel for the Munich massacre.

Once ensconced in the Knesset, he joined Menachem Begin's coalition, with one of his first acts being to vote in favour of a law that prohibited the extradition of Israeli citizens. He sat on the Economic Affairs Committee and in 1978 he renamed the party Development and Peace. During his Knesset term he was involved in negotiations to free Israeli POWs. The party ran in the 1981 and 1984 elections, but did not pass the electoral threshold of 1% in either, and subsequently disappeared. He was never extradited to France to serve the five-year sentence given to him in his absence, as the five-year statute of limitations expired.

In 1984, he was sentenced to three months community service for bribery during the 1977 election campaign. It had emerged that he had "bought votes in 1977 by promising apartments to young couples and homes to others at reduced prices" as well as paying voters (who were described as "campaign workers") and giving money to a local party in Dimona to be associated with his party. His community service was performed in a state agency in Tel Aviv.

== Later life ==
After losing his seat in the Knesset in 1981, Flatto-Sharon returned to private business. He and his wife Annette became celebrities known for hosting parties in their luxury villa in Savyon, with businessmen and other celebrities attending. The French government put out an international arrest warrant for him in 1975, so he rarely left Israel. In the early 1990s, after learning that he no longer had an Interpol warrant out for his arrest, he flew to Italy on a business trip, and was arrested upon arrival in Rome. Facing possible extradition to France, he escaped back to Israel disguised as a woman. He eventually paid a large fine to settle his criminal case with the French authorities.

In 1998, he was arrested on suspicion of involvement in an arson at the Tel Aviv Cultural Center in 1996 together with four co-conspirators in order to file insurance claims on pieces of art stored there. He ultimately served three days in prison and two weeks of house arrest.

Flatto-Sharon was an established multi-millionaire, and worked primarily in later life as a radio talk-show host. His show, named Flatto Bli Heshbon (Flatto without accountability) was broadcast on numerous stations, including Radius 100, Lev HaMedina, Radio Haifa and Radio Darom FM in the Middle East. He was married three times. He had two children. His daughter Hilda is a homeopathic doctor, and his son Yoav is a private businessman.

Flatto-Sharon died in Israel on 7 December 2018 due to a heart attack. He was 88.

== See also ==
- List of Israeli public officials convicted of crimes or misdemeanors
