= Alexander A. Maximow =

Russian-American scientist (1874–1928)

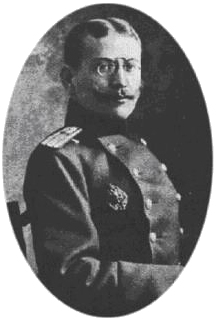
- Born: 3 February 1874; Saint Petersburg, Russia
- Died: 4 December 1928 (aged 54); Chicago, Illinois, U.S.
- Education: Imperial Military Medical Academy, Russia
- Known for: Unitary theory of stem cells in adult organisms, in particular of the blood stem cell
- Scientific career
- Fields: Medicine, histology, embryology, hematology
- Workplaces: Imperial Military Medical Academy, Russia; University of Chicago, U.S.

Alexander Alexandrowitsch Maximow (Russian: Александр Александрович Максимов; 3 February [O.S. 22 January] 1874 – December 4, 1928) was a Russian-American scientist in the fields of Histology and Embryology whose team developed the hypothesis about the existence of "polyblasts". Maximow is renowned for his experimental work on the unitarian theory of hematopoiesis: all blood cells develop from a common precursor cell. Maximow served as a Corresponding Member of the Russian Academy of Sciences.

== Biography ==
Alexander A. Maximow was born into an old and wealthy merchant family in Saint Petersburg in Russia. From 1882 onwards he was a pupil of Karl May School in Saint Petersburg and in 1891 he entered the Imperial Military Medical Academy in Saint Petersburg, aged 17. During this time he completed his first scientific works, and he was awarded the gold medal for research on the "Histogenesis of experimentally induced amyloid degeneration of the liver in animals" published in the journal Russian Archives of pathology, clinical medicine and bacteriology. In 1896, he earned a degree as a medical doctor from the same institution. Subsequently, he studied for two years in Germany at Freiburg and Berlin. Returning to Saint Petersburg, he served as professor of histology and embryology from 1903 until 1922. While he could teach and pursue his research after the Russian Revolution he could not arrange himself with living in communist Russia. He fled 1922 with his sister, his wife and his adopted son to the USA. From 1922 until his death in 1928, he served as a professor of anatomy at the University of Chicago and conducted his research with his sister Claudia as congenial lab technician and co-worker at his side ("...(stand) ihm seine Schwester Claudia als kongeniale Laborantin und Mitarbeiterin zur Seite...")

From 1896 until 1902, Maximow authored numerous papers, concerning a variety of histologic problems, which established the background for his future work. In the later stages of his career, Maximow was primarily interested in the blood and the connective tissues. After demonstrating that all blood cells develop from a common precursor cell, Maximow confirmed the unitarian theory of hematopoiesis. His other experimental work provided evidence confirming that lymphocytes of the blood and lymph nodes are undifferentiated cells.

Maximow wrote "the world's most respected textbook in histology," a book that became a standard text for medical students and ran to 12 editions. He also developed and introduced a unitarian theory of hematopoiesis, a theory upon which the modern concept of blood cells' origin and differentiation is based.

For four years before Maximow's death, fellow histologist William Bloom worked closely with him on the Textbook of Histology. Bloom ultimately completed the work, which was first published in 1930.

He died on December 4, 1928, in his sleep in Chicago after of a long-standing history of severe coronary arteriosclerosis.

== Works ==
- Maximow, Alexander A. (1905). "Über Zellformen des lockeren Bindegewebes". Arch mikr Anat 67: 680–757.
- Maximow, Alexander A. (1906). 'Über experimentelle Erzeugung von Knochenmarkgewebe". Anat Anz 28: 608–612.
- Maximow, Alexander A. (1909). "Untersuchungen über Blut und Bindegewebe I. Die frühesten Entwicklungsstadien der Blut- und Bindegewebszellen beim Säugetierembryo, bis zum Anfang der Blutbilding in der Leber." Arch. Mikroskop. Anat. 73, 444–561.
- Maximow, Alexander A. (1909). "Der Lymphozyt als gemeinsame Stammzelle der verschiedenen Blutelemente in der embryonalen Entwicklung und im postfetalen Leben der Säugetiere". Folia Haematologica 8.1909, 125–134. Translation into English: The Lymphocyte as a stem cell common to different blood elements in embryonic development and during the post-fetal life of mammals,
- Maximow, Alexander A. (1910). "Untersuchungen über Blut und Bindegewebe. III. Die embryonale Histogenese des Knochenmarks der Säugetiere". Arch mikr Anat 76: 1–113.
- Maximow, Alexander A. (1924). "Relation of blood cells to connective tissues and endothelium." Physiological Revue 4 (4): 533–563.
- Maximow, Alexander A. (1926). "Über undifferenzierte Blutzellen und mesenchymale Keimlager im erwachsenen Organismus". Klin Wochensch 5: 2193–2199.
- Maximow, Alexander A. (1927). "Morphology of the mesenchymal reactions". Arch Pathol 4: 557–606.
- Maximow, Alexander A. (1927). "Development of non-granular leucocytes (lymphocytes and monocytes) into polyblasts (macrophages) and fibroblasts in vitro". Proc Soc Exp Biol Med 24: 570–572.
- Maximow, Alexander A. (1928). "Cultures of blood leucocytes. From lymphocyte and monocyte to connective tissue". Arch Exp Zellforsch 5: 169–268.
- Maximow, Alexander A. and William Bloom (1930). A textbook of histology. Philadelphia: W. B. Saunders.
