= Michael Gorlovsky =

Israeli politician

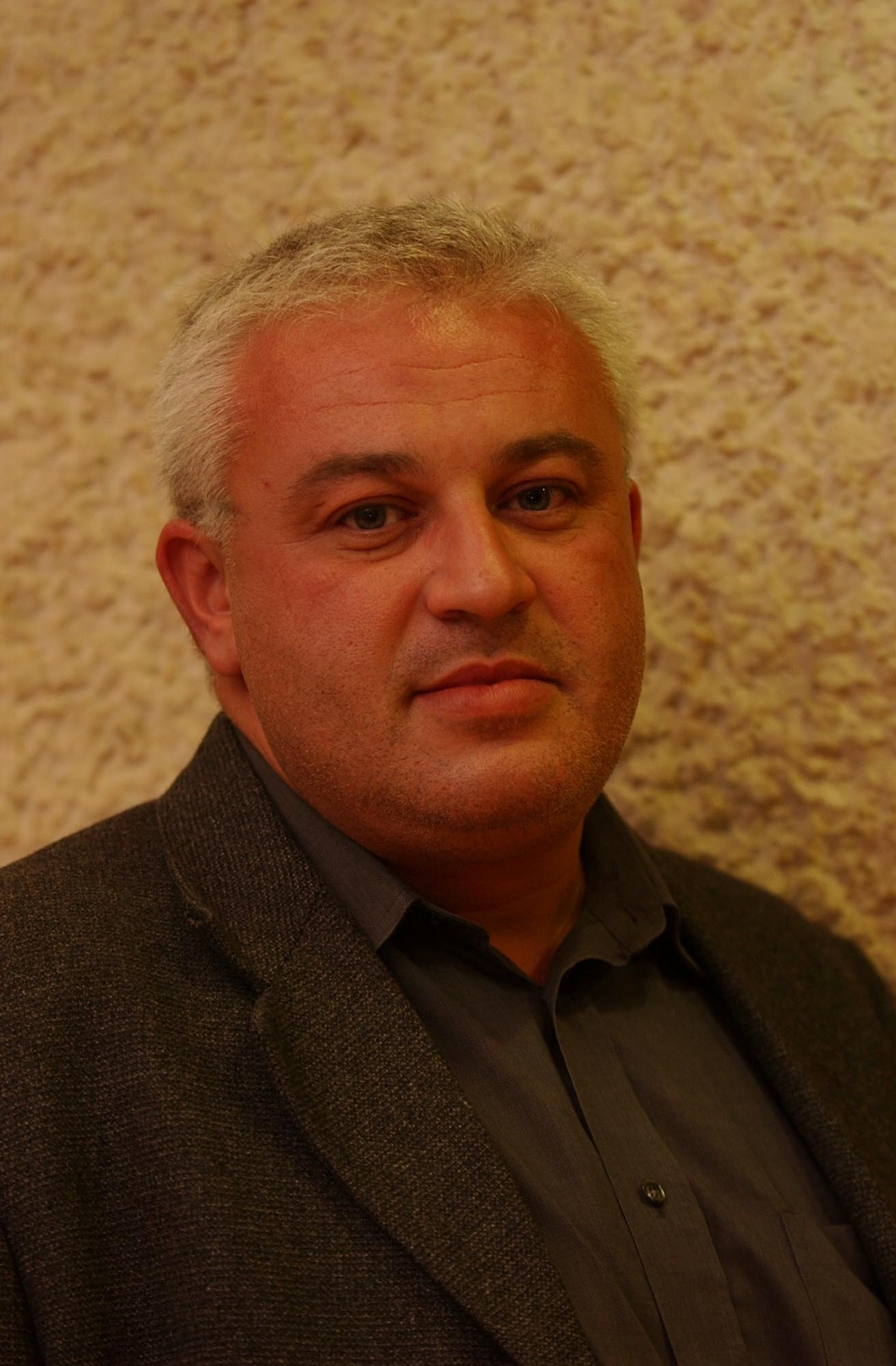
- Gorlovsky in the mid-2000s

Faction represented in the Knesset
- 2003–2006: Likud

Personal details
- Born: 24 January 1963 (age 63) Dzerzhinsk, Soviet Union

Michael Gorlovsky (Hebrew: מיכאל גורלובסקי; born 24 January 1963) is an Israeli former politician who served as a member of the Knesset for Likud between 2003 and 2006. During his term he was involved in what became known as the "double votes scam".

== Biography ==
Born in Dzerzhinsk in the Soviet Union, Gorlovsky emigrated to Israel in 1988.

In 1996 he was photographed removing Labor Party posters during the election campaign. He worked as a chauffeur and operations man for Avigdor Lieberman.

For the 2003 Knesset elections he was placed 27th on the Likud list, and entered the Knesset when the party won 38 seats. Whilst an MK, he served on several Knesset committees, including the House Committee, the Finance Committee, the Internal Affairs and Environment Committee, the Committee on Foreign Workers and the Committee for Immigration, Absorption and Diaspora Affairs.

In 2003 he voted twice during a Knesset ballot (placing a vote on behalf of Gilad Erdan), a move he blamed on being "tired" and "confused". Attorney General Menachem Mazuz requested that the Knesset lift his parliamentary immunity, but the request was rejected by the House Committee. The Movement for Quality Government filed a petition with the High Court to protest the committee's decision, resulting in a decision that the committee had overstepped its authority in not revoking Gorlovsky's immunity. However, the committee ignored the verdict, resulting in a second petition from the movement. In November 2005 Mazuz announced that he would be charging Gorlovsky with fraud, deception and breach of trust.

He lost his seat in the March 2006 elections, and in September 2006 the Jerusalem prosecutor's office informed the court that it had struck a plea bargain with Gorlovsky in which he would be charged with breach of trust rather than fraud. In February 2007 he received a suspended sentence and community service.

== See also ==
- List of Israeli public officials convicted of crimes or misdemeanors
