= Naphtali Hirsch Altschuler =

Talmudic scholar and writer (16th–17th centuries)

Naphtali Hirsch ben Asher Altschuler (Hebrew: נפתלי הירש בן אשר אלטשולר) was a Talmudic scholar and writer who lived in Russia and Poland — principally at Lublin, Miczdyrzei, and Zhytomyr — toward the end of the sixteenth and at the beginning of the seventeenth century.

== Works ==
He was the author of two works, one of which was Ayyalah Sheluhah (A Swift Deer), a commentary on the Prophets and the Hagiographa, and supplemented it by a Judæo-German glossary: it was published, with the text of the Bible, at Kraków, 1593-1595. The other, Imre Shefer (Beautiful Words), was an alphabetically arranged catalogue of all matters that preachers and rabbis were at all likely to discuss in their sermons, with indications as to the various ways in which each topic might be treated (Lublin, 1602).
