= Susan Hazan =

- סוזן חזן
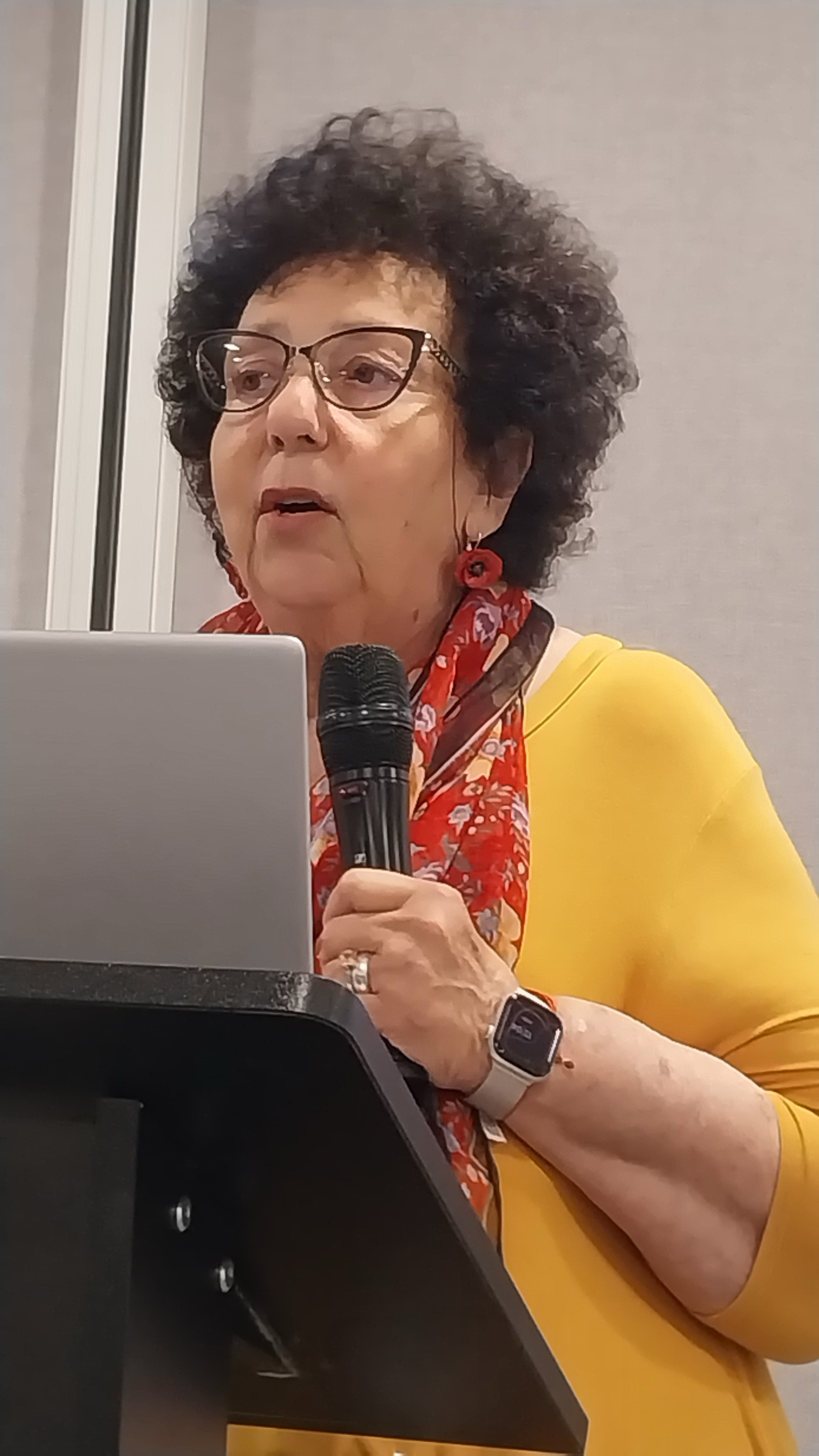
- Susan Hazan speaking at the EVA London 2026 Conference
- Born: Susan J. Markless; 1952 (age 73–74); London, England
- Education: Goldsmiths, University of London
- Occupation: Museum curator
- Years active: 1991 onwards
- Employer: Israel Museum
- Known for: Head of the Internet Office, Israel Museum; Chair of the Europeana Network Association; Dead Sea Scrolls digital project
- Notable work: Israel Museum website (1995)
- Website: museumsphere.com

Susan Hazan (Hebrew: סוזן חזן) is a museum curator based in Jerusalem, Israel. She has been a curator at the Israel Museum for much of her career and is known for promoting digital aspects of museum access, especially in the form of virtual museums.

Hazan studied for MA (2000), MPhil (2002), and PhD (2004) degrees at Goldsmiths, University of London, with a thesis entitled Mapping the Musesphere: Cultures of Exhibition and Technologies of Display.

Susan Hazan has been Senior Curator of New Media and Head of the Internet Office at the Israel Museum from 1991 to 2020. In particular, she produced and developed the museum's first website from the mid-1990s. She has also been instrumental in a digital project to make the Dead Sea Scrolls accessible more widely around the world in different languages.

In parallel from 2004, Hazan has led the EVA/MINERA Jerusalem conference series, covering electronic visualisation and the arts. She has also been Chair of the Europeana Network Association during 2021 to 2022, with the aim to make museum collections around Europe accessible online, including the European Commission's New European Bauhaus initiative.

Since 2019, Hazan has been the CEO of Digital Heritage, Israel.
