= Chasen (surname) =

Chasen is a Jewish surname. It derives from Hebrew chazan (חזן, "cantor"). Alternate spellings are Hazan and Chazan. Notable people with the surname include:

- Frederick Nutter Chasen (1896–1942), English zoologist
- Heather Chasen (1927–2020), English actress
- Ronni Chasen (1946–2010), American film publicist
- Michael Chasen, American businessman and entrepreneur, CEO of SocialRadar, and Co-Founder of Blackboard Inc.
