= Rita Hazan =

American hair colorist

Rita Hazan (born New York, New York) is a hair colorist known for her work with celebrities, and is the owner of the Rita Hazan Salon in NYC.

She started her career at the Oribe Salon as an assistant. In November 2007, Hazan had her first appearance on the Oprah Winfrey Show. She then went on to appear as a go-to expert for many transformation and makeover episodes. Her celebrity clients include Beyoncé, Mariah Carey, Jennifer Lopez, Thalía, Jessica Simpson, and Katy Perry.

Hazan launched her namesake hair care line in 2011. Her product line have been profiled in fashion and beauty magazines such as Allure US, Elle (US), Glamour (US), InStyle (US), and Teen Vogue (US). Rita is one of the co-creators of Sunsilk, a Unilever brand. She is the brand’s color expert, and has been collaborating with the hair care line since 2009.

== Personal ==
Hazan began doing hair at 17. She spent the first ten years of her career at Manhattan’s Oribe salon. She then opened her own hair and beauty salon on Manhattan’s Upper East Side in 2003. In November 2006, the salon relocated to a 6,000 square foot space at 720 Fifth Avenue.
