= Orest Khvolson =

Russian physicist (1852–1934)

Orest Danilovich Khvolson
- Оре́ст Дани́лович Хво́льсон
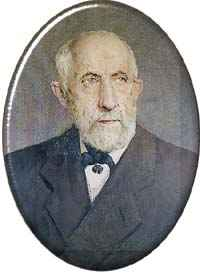
- Orest Khvolson
- Born: Орест Данилович Хвoльсон; 4 December 1852; Sankt-Petersburg, Russian Empire
- Died: 11 May 1934 (aged 81); Leningrad, USSR
- Resting place: Smolensky Cemetery, Saint Petersburg, Russia
- Citizenship: Russian Empire; USSR
- Education: Saint Petersburg Imperial University (magistr, 1875); Saint Petersburg Imperial University (doktor, 1880)
- Known for: Einstein-Khvolson ring; Actinometer; Pyrheliometer
- Spouse(s): Matilda Vasilyevna Khvolson, née Shondorf (died 1929)
- Children: 2
- Awards: Lomonosov Award (1892 and 1908); Order of Franz Joseph (Austria); Order of the Red Banner of Labour (1926); Hero of Labour (1927)
- Scientific career
- Fields: Physics, astrophysics, meteorology
- Workplaces: Saint Petersburg Imperial University (1876-1929); Bestuzhev Courses (1890-1899); Karl May School; Petrischule (1876)
- Thesis: "О магнитных успокоителях" (On magnetic dampers) (1880)
- Academic advisors: Carl Neumann

Orest Danilovich Khvolson or Chwolson (Russian: Орест Данилович Хвольсон; 4 December [O.S. 22 November] 1852 – May 11, 1934) was a Russian and later Soviet physicist and honorary member of the Soviet Academy of Sciences (1920). He is most noted for being one of the first to study the astronomical gravitational lens effect.

== Early life and education ==
Orest Danilovich Khvolson was born on 22 November (4 December, New Style) 1852 in Saint Petersburg, into the family of Daniel Abramovich Chwolson, a noted Orientalist and Semiticist.

Khvolson received his secondary education at the Karl May Gymnasium, where he studied from 1861 to 1869. He displayed a keen interest in a variety of scientific disciplines, particularly chemistry and physics, often conducting experiments and constructing his own instruments. In 1869, he enrolled at the Faculty of Physics and Mathematics of the Imperial Saint Petersburg University, graduating in 1873 with the degree of Candidate of Sciences. He was awarded a gold medal for his thesis entitled "On Possible Velocities and the Conditions of Equilibrium of Contacting Surfaces" (О возможных скоростях и условиях равновесия соприкасающихся поверхностей).

Following his graduation, Khvolson continued his studies in mathematics and physics at the University of Leipzig until the autumn of 1874. Upon returning to Russia, he passed his master’s examinations in 1875 and successfully defended his master's thesis in the spring of 1876 on the topic "On the Mechanism of Magnetic Induction in Steel" (О механизме магнитной индукции в стали).

== Career ==
Khvolson began teaching at his alma mater in 1876 and became a professor in 1891. He authored works on electricity, magnetism, photometry, and actinometry. He proposed the designs of an actinometer and a pyrheliometer, which would be used by Russian weather stations for many years.

After 1896, Khvolson was mainly engaged in compiling the five-volume Physics Course (Курс физики), which would improve immensely the teaching of physics throughout the country and remain a principal textbook in universities for years to come. It was even translated into the German, French, and Spanish languages.

His most noted accomplishment was in 1924, when he published about gravitational lenses in Astronomische Nachrichten, a scientific journal on astronomy. In the article he mentioned the "halo effect" of gravitation when the source, lens, and observer are in near-perfect alignment (now referred to as the Einstein ring), although he did not explicitly discuss the use of the ring as lens.

The concept of gravitational lenses did not get much attention until 1936, when Albert Einstein wrote about the gravitational lens effect. The "halo" effect of a gravitational lens, where one source (sun or galaxy) produces a ring around another source is referred to as an Chwolson ring, or Einstein ring.

He became an honorary member of the Soviet Academy of Sciences, awarded the Order of the Red Banner of Labour. The crater Khvolson on the Moon is named after him.

== Personal life ==
His wife was Matilda (Ida-Matilda) Vasilyevna Khvolson, née Shondorf (1854–1929). They had two daughters, Anna Orestovna Khvolson (1880–1942) and Vera Orestovna Khvolson (1890-?).

== Publications ==
- Lehre von der strahlenden Energie (in French). Vol. 2. Paris: Librairie scientifique Hermann et C.ie. 1906.
- Die Lehre von den gasformingen, flussigen und festen Korpern (in French). Vol. 1. Paris: Librairie scientifique Hermann et C.ie. 1907.
- Lehre von der strahlenden Energie (in French). Vol. 2. Paris: Librairie scientifique Hermann et C.ie. 1909.
- Lehre von der Elektrizität (in French). Vol. 4. Paris: Librairie scientifique Hermann et C.ie. 1910.
  - Lehre von der Elektrizität (in French). Vol. 4. Paris: Librairie scientifique Hermann et C.ie. 1913.
  - Lehre von der Elektrizität (in French). Vol. 5. Paris: Librairie scientifique Hermann et C.ie. 1914.
- Lehre von der Warme (in French). Vol. 3. Paris: Librairie scientifique Hermann et C.ie. 1909.
  - Lehre von der Warme (in French). Vol. 3. Paris: Librairie scientifique Hermann et C.ie. 1910.
  - Lehre von der Warme (in French). Vol. 3. Paris: Librairie scientifique Hermann et C.ie. 1911.
- Lehre von der strahlenden Energie (in French). Vol. 2. Paris: Librairie scientifique Hermann et C.ie. 1906.
- Lehre von der strahlenden Energie (in French). Vol. 2. Paris: Librairie scientifique Hermann et C.ie. 1907.
- Lehre vom Schall (in French). Vol. 1. Paris: Librairie scientifique Hermann et C.ie. 1908.
- Chwolson, O (1924). "Über eine mögliche Form fiktiver Doppelsterne". Astronomische Nachrichten. 221 (20): 329–330. Bibcode:1924AN....221..329C. doi:10.1002/asna.19242212003.
- Davaux, E. (1906–1928). Traité de physique [Kurs fiziki] (in French). Translated by O.-D. Chwolson. Paris: A. Hermann – via gallica.bnf.fr.
