= Viktor Valentinovich Novozhilov =

Soviet economist and mathematician (1892-1970)

- Born: 27 October 1892; Kharkov, Kharkov Governorate, Russian Empire (now Ukraine)
- Died: 15 August 1970 (aged 77); Leningrad, Soviet Union
- Education: St. Volodymyr Kyiv University
- Scientific career
- Fields: Economics

Viktor Valentinovich Novozhilov (Russian: Ви́ктор Валенти́нович Новожи́лов) (27 October [O.S. 15 October] 1892 – 15 August 1970) was a Soviet economist and mathematician, known for his development of techniques for the mathematical analysis of economic phenomena. He was awarded the Lenin Prize (1965) and served as head of the Laboratory for Economic Assessment Systems at the Leningrad office of the Central Economic Mathematical Institute.

== Biography ==
Novozhilov graduated from high school with a gold medal in 1911 and entered the St. Volodymyr Kyiv University, which he completed in 1915, becoming an assistant professor in political economics and statistics. In 1922, he moved to the Leningrad Polytechnic Institute, where he served as the head of the department of Auto Industry Economics from 1938 to 1951. From 1951 to 1966, Novozhilov was the head of the Statistics Department at the Leningrad Engineering and Economics Institute.

He was part of the government-sponsored team engaged in economic reform analysis in the 1920s in the Soviet Union. He performed extensive research in the field of economic analysis for agriculture and made specific recommendations regarding optimal investment levels in a socialist agricultural setting.
