= John Hazan =

British barrister and judge

Sir John Boris Roderick Hazan (3 October 1926 – 19 August 1988) was a British barrister and judge. He was appointed to the High Court of Justice in January 1988 and sat in the Queen's Bench Division, but died eight months later.
