= Samuel Hazan =

Canadian-Israeli footballer

Samuel Hazan שמואל חזן
Personal information
- Full name: Samuel Hazan
- Date of birth: 5 March 1983 (age 43)
- Place of birth: Canada

Youth career
- 2000–2002: Maccabi Haifa

Senior career*
Years	Team	Apps	(Gls)
2004–2005	Maccabi Netanya		
2009	Italia Shooters	4	(0)

International career^{‡}
1999–2000	Israel U16	4	(0)
- * Club domestic league appearances and goals as of 07:26, 21 September 2009 (UTC) ‡ National team caps and goals as of 15:05, 24 April 2008 (UTC)

Samuel Hazan (Hebrew: שמואל "שמוליק" חזן; born 5 March 1983) is a Canadian-Israeli football player.

== Biography ==
=== 2005 Maccabiah Games ===
Hazan was part of the Canadian team that played in its first Maccabiah Games. He set the record and was the first-ever goalscorer for Canada at the 2005 Maccabiah Games in a 1–0 win over defending gold medal champions, Argentina. At the 2022 Maccabiah Games, he played for Canada in the Masters Men competition.
