= Daniel Chwolson =

Russian-Jewish scholar of the Arabic language

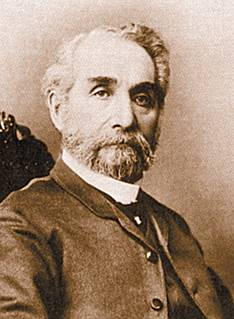
Chwolson as pictured in the beginning of the 20th century

Daniel Abramovich Chwolson or Chwolsohn or Khvolson (Russian: Даниил Авраамович (Абрамович) Хвольсон; Hebrew: דניאל אברמוביץ' חבולסון; December 3, 1819 [O.S. November 21]) – March 23, 1911 [O.S. March 12])) was a Russian-Jewish scholar of the Arabic language.

== Biography ==
Chwolson was born in Vilnius, which was then part of the Russian Empire. As he showed marked ability in the study of Hebrew and Talmud, his parents, who were very religious, destined him for the rabbinate, and placed him at the yeshiva of Rabbi Israel Günzburg. Up to his eighteenth year he did not know any other language than Hebrew, but in three years he acquired a fair knowledge of German, French, and Russian.

Chwolson went to Breslau in 1841, and, after three years' preparation in the classical languages, entered Breslau University, where he devoted himself to Arabic. There he studied until 1848, and in 1850 he received the degree of doctor of philosophy at Leipzig University.

On his return to Russia he settled in St. Petersburg, where his son, the physicist Orest Khvolson, was born in 1852. In 1855, being highly appreciated in learned circles, and having embraced Christianity, he was appointed extraordinary professor of Oriental languages in the university. Three years later he received a similar appointment in the Dukhovnaya Akademiya (Theological Academy). In 1856, the Imperial Academy issued, at its own expense, Chwolson's first work, which established the authority of its author in the field of Oriental research, the two-volume Die Ssabier und der Ssabismus (Sabians and Sabianism). Three years later Chwolson published Ueber die Ueberreste der Altbabylonischen Literatur in Arabischen Uebersetzungen (St. Petersburg, 1859; also in Russian in The Russian Messenger under the title Novootkrytie Pamyatniki). This work made a great sensation among scholars by the importance of its discoveries and by Chwolson's theories concerning the old Babylonian monuments. It was followed in 1860 by Ueber Tammuz und die Menschenverehrung bei den Alten Babyloniern (ib. 1860).

The learned world in 1899 celebrated Chwolson's literary jubilee by presenting him with a collection of articles written in his honor by prominent European scholars. This was published by Baron David Günzburg under the title Recueil des travaux rédigés en mémoire du jubilé scientifique de M. Daniel Chwolson, Berlin, 1899.

== Work against antisemitism ==
Blood libel accusations had been brought against the Jews of Saratov in 1857, and the government summoned a commission of scholars to see whether any passages could be found in Jewish literature recommending the use of Christian blood for ritual purposes. Chwolson, who was appointed a member of the commission, wrote a report in which he demonstrated the groundlessness of the accusations in general, and pointed out that in the particular case of Saratov the evidence given by the two principal witnesses was full of contradictions and absurdities. The investigation extended over a period of nine years. Chwolson secured permission to publish his memoir, which appeared in 1861 as O nekotorykh srednevekovykh obvineniyakh protiv evreyev ("On several medieval accusations against the Jews").

In 1878 Chwolson saw a new blood accusation brought against Georgian Jews at Kutais, Transcaucasia. At the same time several Russian anti-Semitic writers undertook a campaign against the Talmud, repeating the old charge that it contained blasphemies against Jesus. Chwolson again took up the defense of the Jews, and republished his memoir with many additions (St. Petersburg, 1880). A German edition of this work appeared in the year 1901 under the title Die Blutanklage und Sonstige Mittelalterliche Beschuldigungen der Juden. In this edition Chwolson, before entering into a discussion of the blood question, expounds the history of the Talmud, and shows that the "Pharisees" condemned by Jesus in the Gospels were not the Rabbinites in general and that it was not the Pharisees but the Sadducees who were the enemies and persecutors of Jesus. He further demonstrates that, according to Talmudic law, Jews were bound to look upon Christians as their brethren, the assertions to the contrary being due partly to misconception, partly to hatred.

The deep-rooted belief that Jesus was crucified by the Jews being the principal cause of the prejudice against them on the part of the Christians, Chwolson, in a dissertation entitled Poslyedniyaya paskhalnaya vecherya Isusa Christa i den' yevo smerti (St. Petersburg, 1875; German translation, Das letzte Passamal Christi, 1892) shows the groundlessness of this belief, pointing out that the proceedings of the trial and condemnation of Jesus, as related in the Gospels, were in violation of the rabbinical laws and consequently could not have been conducted by a Jewish tribunal.

He defended the Jewish people as well as Judaism. In a work entitled Kharakteristika semitskikh narodov published in The Russian Messenger, 1872 (German ed., Berlin, 1872), he draws a parallel between the distinguishing characteristics of the Jew, the representative of the Semitic race, and those of the Greek, the representative of the Aryan peoples, not always to the advantage of the latter. The pamphlet was translated into English under the title The Semitic Nations (Cincinnati, 1874).

He also wrote:

- Statistische Nachrichten über die Orientalische Facultät der Universität zu St. Petersburg, Leipzig, 1861
- "Achtzehn Hebräische Grabschriften aus der Krim," in the Mémoires of the St. Petersburg Academy of Science, 1865 (Russian translation, "Vosemnadtzat nadgrobnykh nadpisei iz Kryma," St. Petersburg, 1866)
- Izvyestiya o khazarakh, burtasakh, mad'yarakh, slavyanakh, i russakh Abu-Ali Akhmeda ben Omar Ibn-Dasta, neizvestnago dosele arabskago pisatelya nachala X veka, St. Petersburg, 1869
- "Novootkryty pamyatnik moavitskavo tsarya Meshi," Khristianskoe chtenie, 1870
- "O vliyanii geograficheskago polozheniya Palestiny na sud'bu evreiskago naroda," ib. 1875 (reprinted in Sbornik budushchnosti, ii.1-4)
- "Die Quiescentes הוי in der althebräischen Orthographie," Leyden, 1878 (Russian tr. in Khristianskoe chtenie, St. Petersburg, 1881) ("a brilliant though erratic study of the matres lectionis in old Hebrew orthography")
- Corpus Inscriptionum Hebraicarum, St. Petersburg and Leipzig, 1882 (Russian translation, ib. 1884)
- Predvaritelnaya zametka o naidennykh v Semiryechenskoi oblasti siriiskikh nadgrobnykh nadpisyakh, Zapadno-Vostochnoe Otdelenie Imperatorskago Russkago Arkhivnago Obshchestva, 1886
- "Syrische Grabschriften aus Semirjetschie," ib. 1890, in the Mémoires of the St. Petersburg Academy
- "Hat es jemals irgend einen Grund gegeben, den Rüsttag des jüdischen Passahfestes als Πρώτῃ τῶν 'Αζύνων zu bezeichnen?" in Zeitschrift für Wissenschaftliche Theologie, v. 38. Leipzig, 1896
- "Staropechatnyya evreiskiya knigi," on Hebrew incunabula, St. Petersburg, 1897 (Hebrew transl., "Reshit Ma'ase ha-Defus," Warsaw, 1897).

Mention may be made here of Chwolson's early contributions of Jewish biographies from Arabic sources, especially that of Maimonides, to the Orient, 1846.

Chwolson was an indefatigable collector of Hebrew books, and his collection of Hebrew incunabula was valuable. A catalogue of his Hebrew books was published by him under the title Reshimat Sifre Yisrael, Vilna, 1897.
