= Yehiel Hazan =

Israeli politician

- יחיאל חזן
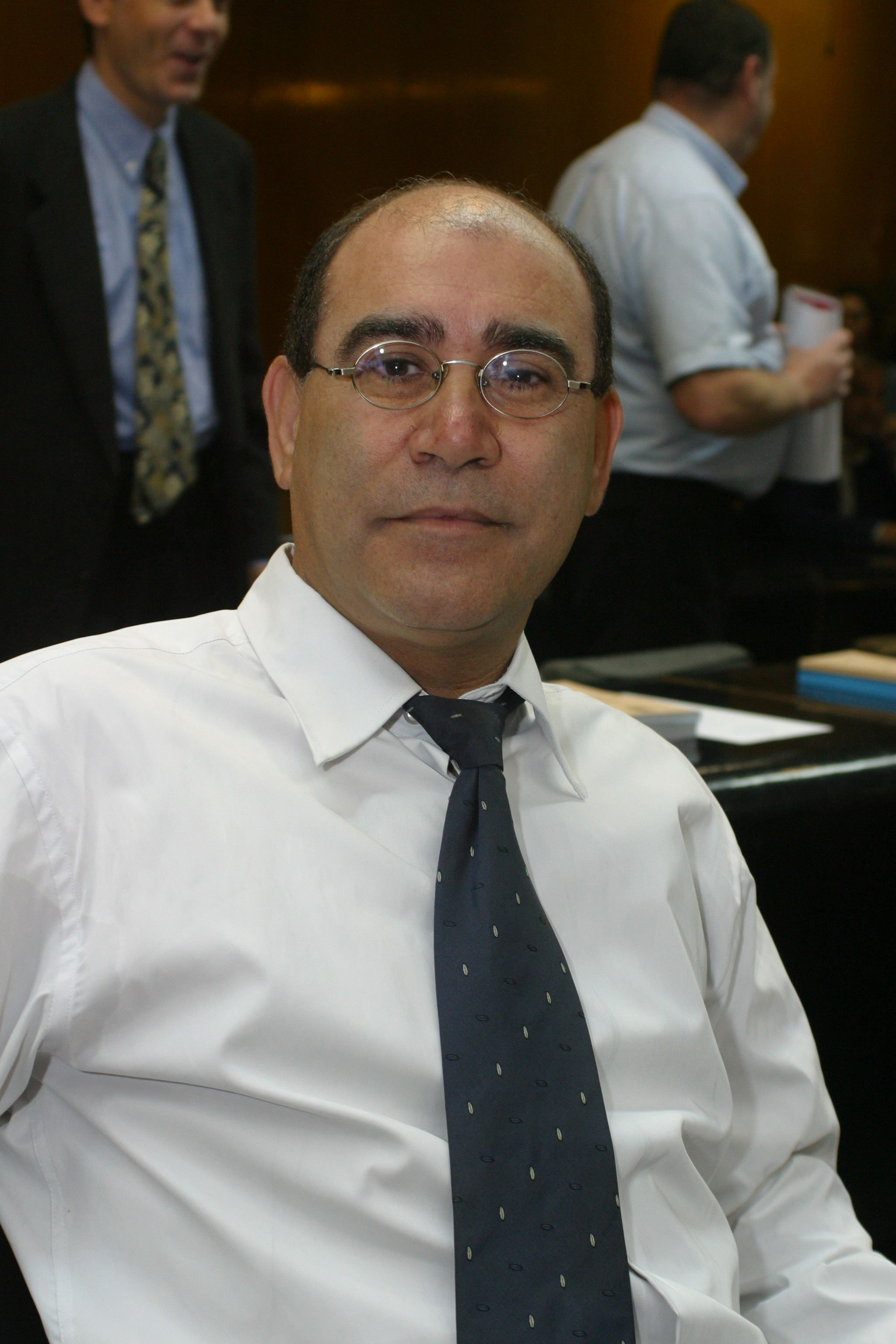

Faction represented in the Knesset
- 2003–2006: Likud

Personal details
- Born: 1 March 1958 (age 68) Hadera, Israel

Yehiel Hazan (Hebrew: יחיאל חזן; born 1 March 1958) is an Israeli politician. He is of a Tunisian-Jewish descent.

== Political career ==
Hazan was born in Hadera and grew up in Or Akiva. He was elected to the Knesset in the 2003 elections as a member of Likud. He chaired the committee on drug abuse, and was a member of several other committees.

During the Knesset term, it emerged that he had voted twice during the second and third readings of a bill on the emergency economic plan in May 2003. After voting on his own panel, he also voted using the panel of absent Likud MK Inbal Gavrieli; both votes were cast against the bill. After being accused, Hazan then attempted to tamper with the evidence by removing the machines in question from the storeroom in which they were kept. However, he was caught in the act by the Knesset's CCTV. Nevertheless, despite the clear evidence, on 22 December 2003, the Knesset narrowly voted (by a majority of one) not to lift his parliamentary immunity.

Hazan was convicted and sentenced to four months of community service, and a six-month suspended prison term. He appealed the sentence, but was rejected by the Jerusalem District Court on 17 January 2007. He was not re-elected to the Knesset in the 2006 elections.

Hazan also courted controversy for his comments about Arabs, stating, "The Arabs are worms who work underground and indiscriminately murder Muslim soldiers." Despite being asked by the Knesset speaker, he refused to retract his comments.

In 2015, his son Oren was elected to the Knesset on the Likud list.

== See also ==
- List of Israeli public officials convicted of crimes or misdemeanors
