= Oren Hazan =

Israeli politician (born 1981)

- אורן חזן
- Hazan in 2015

Faction represented in the Knesset
- 2015–2019: Likud

Personal details
- Born: 28 October 1981 (age 45)

Oren Asaf Hazan (Hebrew: אורן אסף חזן; born 28 October 1981) is a former Israeli politician. He served as a member of the 20th Knesset for the Likud party between 2015 and 2019.

== Early life ==
The son of former Likud Knesset member Yehiel Hazan and Aviva, Oren served in the Israeli Air Force during his IDF national service as an air traffic controller, and a security officer. He studied law at Ono Academic College, where he was chairman of the student union. He later managed a casino in Bulgaria.

== Public career ==
Prior to the 2015 elections, he was placed 30th on the Likud list, a spot reserved for young candidates. He was elected to the Knesset as Likud won 30 seats.

After election to the Knesset, Hazan received membership in the Foreign Affairs and Defense Committee and the House Committee, from which he was expelled by Likud, following a string of controversies, including a no-show at the plenum meeting, which led to the ruling coalition bill being rejected. In 2016 due to a series of reports of bullying and rude behavior towards members, colleagues suspended the politician from the floor of the Knesset chamber for a period of six months except for voting. Hazan was the second legislator in the history of the State of Israel to be suspended, with MK Haneen Zoabi being the first one.

Hazan placed 35th in the pre-April 2019 Israeli legislative election Likud primaries, a slot thought to have been too low to have a realistic chance for getting reelected to the Knesset. He therefore re-established the Tzomet party and ran on its list in the elections. His new party garnered only 0.06% of the vote and did not win any seats.

== Controversy ==
Of the Palestinians, Hazan stated in the Knesset: "We're gonna shut your mouths, and we're going to speak the truth. There is no Palestinian people. And there has never been a Palestinian people [in Hebrew, Am Ha'Falastinai]. ..." Hazan said that the Jewish people had been around for 3,500 years since Abraham and Isaac, while the Palestinian people had only been around for 40 years since Yasser Arafat.

In November 2015, Hazan was suspended from the Knesset for a month after accusing Meretz MK Issawi Frej of double voting, after Yesh Atid MK Karine Elharrar asked for assistance as she has muscular dystrophy.

In December 2017, Hazan stopped a bus on its way to Nafha Prison, telling the Palestinian relatives that the prisoners were "terrorists who belong in the ground". He shouted at one prisoner's mother that her son was an "insect" and a "dog". The Red Cross stated that Israel has a duty to guarantee the safety and dignity of Palestinian families visiting prisoners, and that it "takes very seriously what happened today (Monday)".

Hazan endorsed the candidature of Marine Le Pen in the 2017 French presidential election, though the Israeli government officially boycotts her National Front movement.

In August 2017, Jerusalem Post reporter Lahav Harkov posted a list of 10 of Oren Hazan's most outrageous moments.

In January 2018, when being interviewed by the BBC, Hazan said, regarding the recently arrested Ahed Tamimi, that he would like to, "kick her in the face" so that she would end up in the hospital.

In July 2018, during an interview to Australian-Israeli activist Avi Yemini, Hazan stated that illegal immigrants from Africa constituted a threat to Israel, which would destroy the country. He suggested Israel should stop African refugees from having children, and that "If we don't kick them out, they will kick us out. We need to destroy the problem when it is still small." Leaders of the South African Jewish community condemned his remarks as racist.

In September 2018, Hazan was rebuked by the Israeli Foreign Ministry for meeting with the leader of the Bulgarian nationalist party Attack, Volen Siderov, who has previously made antisemitic remarks, without notifying the ministry beforehand. Hazan claimed that Siderov privately apologized for his previous statements.

Following the marriage of Jewish actor and singer Tzachi Halevy to Muslim news anchor Lucy Aharish, Hazan criticized the couple on Twitter for what he saw as assimilation. Then interior minister Aryeh Deri echoed his position, but some other politicians and public figures such as Shelly Yachimovich, Yoel Hasson, and Idan Raichel reacted negatively to Hazan's comments, describing them as racist.

== Legal issues ==
Shortly after his election in 2015, Channel 12 reported that Hazan had hired prostitutes and used hard drugs during a trip to Bulgaria. Hazan sued for libel, but the lawsuit was thrown out of court because the reportage was deemed "responsible, serious journalism and reflected the reality as it was".

On 9 September 2019, Hazan was sentenced to 100 hours of community service for an incident in 2014 when he had assaulted a civil servant for freezing his mother's bank account for nonpayment of taxes.

== Personal life ==
Hazan lives in the Israeli settlement of Ariel in the West Bank. On 12 February 2017, he married Rinat Kotkovsky, after an engagement lasting just over a month. His first child, a daughter, was born on 28 August 2017. His second child, a son, was born February 12, 2019.
