= Haim Laskov =

5th Chief of Staff of the IDF

- חיים לסקוב
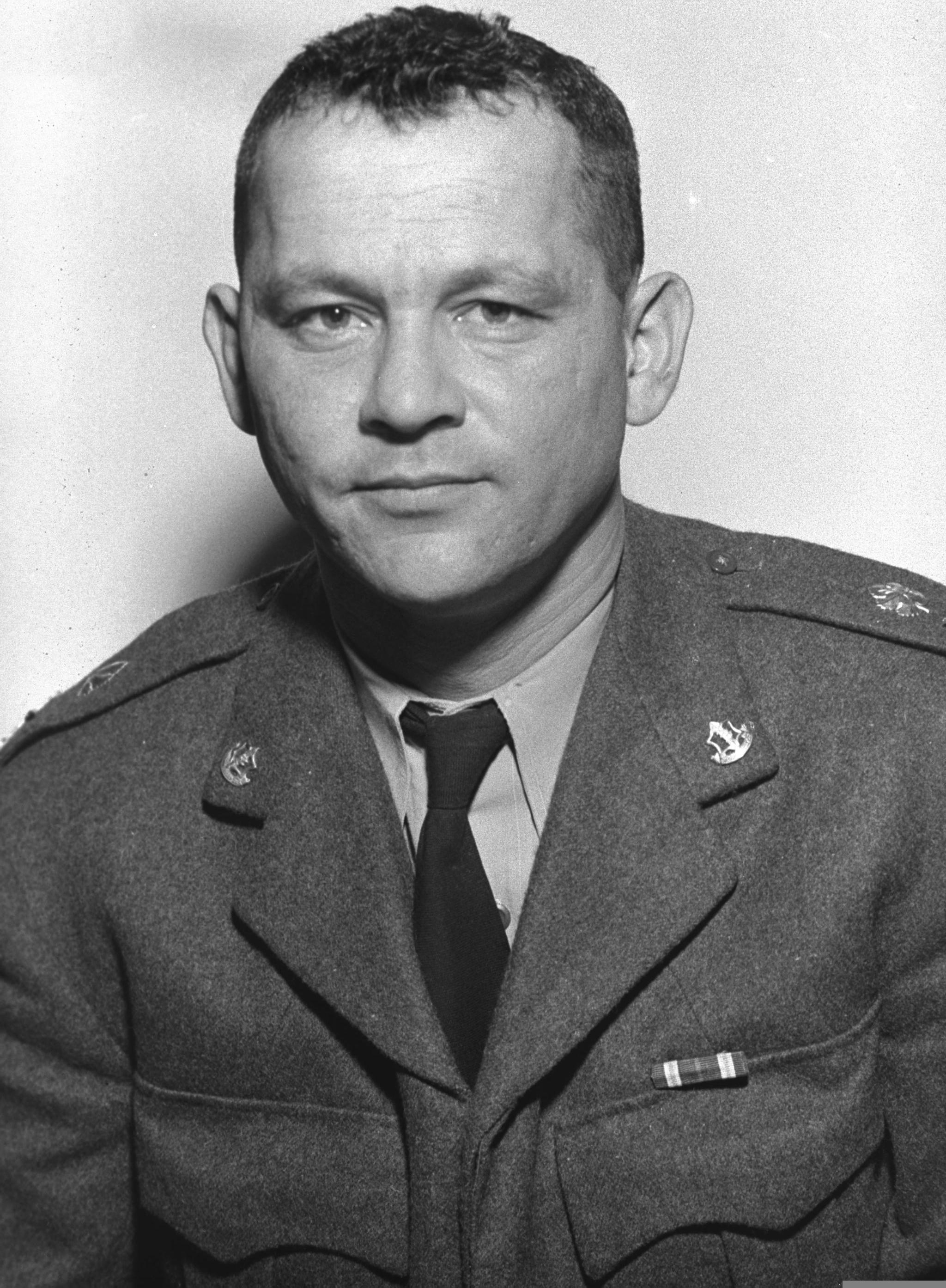
- Haim Laskov in 1952
- Born: 1919; Barysaw, Byelorussian Soviet Socialist Republic
- Died: December 8, 1982 (age 62-63); Israel
- Military career
- Allegiance: Israel
- Branch: British Army; Haganah; Israel Defense Forces
- Service years: 1932–1965
- Rank: Rav Aluf (Chief of Staff; highest rank)
- Conflicts: World War II; 1948 Arab–Israeli War; Suez Crisis

Signature
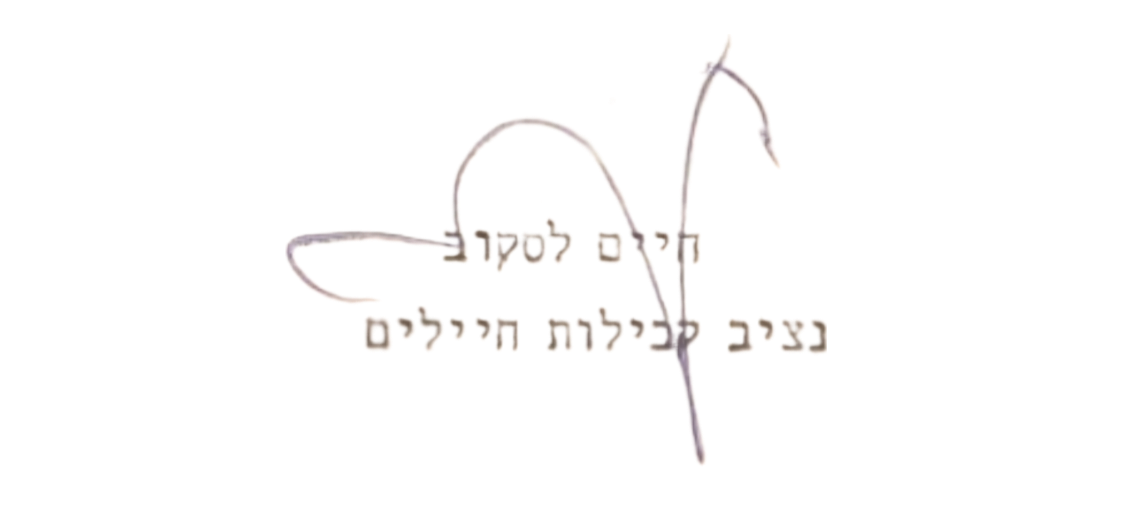

Haim Laskov (Hebrew: חיים לסקוב; 1919 – 8 December 1982) was an Israeli public figure and the fifth Chief of Staff of the Israel Defense Forces.

== Biography ==
Haim Laskov was born in Barysaw in the Byelorussian Soviet Socialist Republic (present-day Belarus), to Moshe and Ita (née Hirshfeld) Laskov. He immigrated to Palestine with his family in 1925. His father had previously lived in Palestine and had been among the founders of Hadera in 1891. The family settled in Haifa, where Laskov studied at the Hebrew Reali School. His father, who worked as a coachman, was killed in an accident in 1930 after Arabs prevented him from freeing his horses from an obstacle.

Laskov joined the Haganah as a teenager and served in various units, including Orde Wingate's Special Night Squads. He also served as a personal messenger for Yaakov Dori, who would later become the first IDF Chief of Staff. In 1940, Laskov joined the British Army so that he could fight in World War II. He served in various capacities, and was an officer in the Jewish Brigade which saw action on the Italian front, eventually reaching the rank of major. After the war, he remained in Europe to participate in the Aliyah Bet illegal immigration effort to bring Jewish refugees to Palestine. Along with other veterans of the Jewish Brigade, he also took part in extrajudicial executions of Nazi war criminals and their collaborators as vengeance for crimes committed against Jews. Upon eventually returning to Palestine, he rejoined the Haganah and was chief of security for the electric company.

Laskov was married to Shulamit.

== Military career ==
When the 1948 Arab–Israeli War erupted in 1948, Laskov assumed responsibility for preparing the framework in which new recruits would be trained. He organized the first officers' course, and formed the graduates into a brigade that fought at Latrun during Operation Nahshon. One month later, in May 1948, he returned to Latrun as commander of Israel's first armored battalion, which fought alongside the 7th Brigade. He commanded the entire brigade during Operation Dekel and Operation Hiram, and participated in the many battles over control of the Galilee. After the capture of Nazareth, he ordered the Palestinian population to be expelled; this order was refused by brigade commander Ben Dunkelman. In July, he finally returned to training new recruits, now with the rank of major general.

Although he had never been a pilot, Laskov was appointed commander of the Israeli Air Force in 1951. During his tenure, the air force prepared to incorporate its first jet fighter, the Meteor. Upon completing his tenure in 1953, Laskov left the army to study philosophy, economics, and political science (PPE) in the United Kingdom. He also obtained additional military training there.

In 1955, he returned to Israel, where he was appointed Deputy Chief of the General Staff and Senior Staff Officer, however, after a series of professional disputes with Moshe Dayan, he was demoted to Commander of the Armored Corps. During the 1956 Sinai Campaign, he commanded the 77th Division, which operated on the Rafah–el-Arish–Kantara front. Upon the death of Asaf Simchoni, Chief of the Southern Command, in a plane crash, Laskov assumed his position, and oversaw the withdrawal of Israeli troops from the Sinai Peninsula.

== Chief of General Staff (1958–61) ==
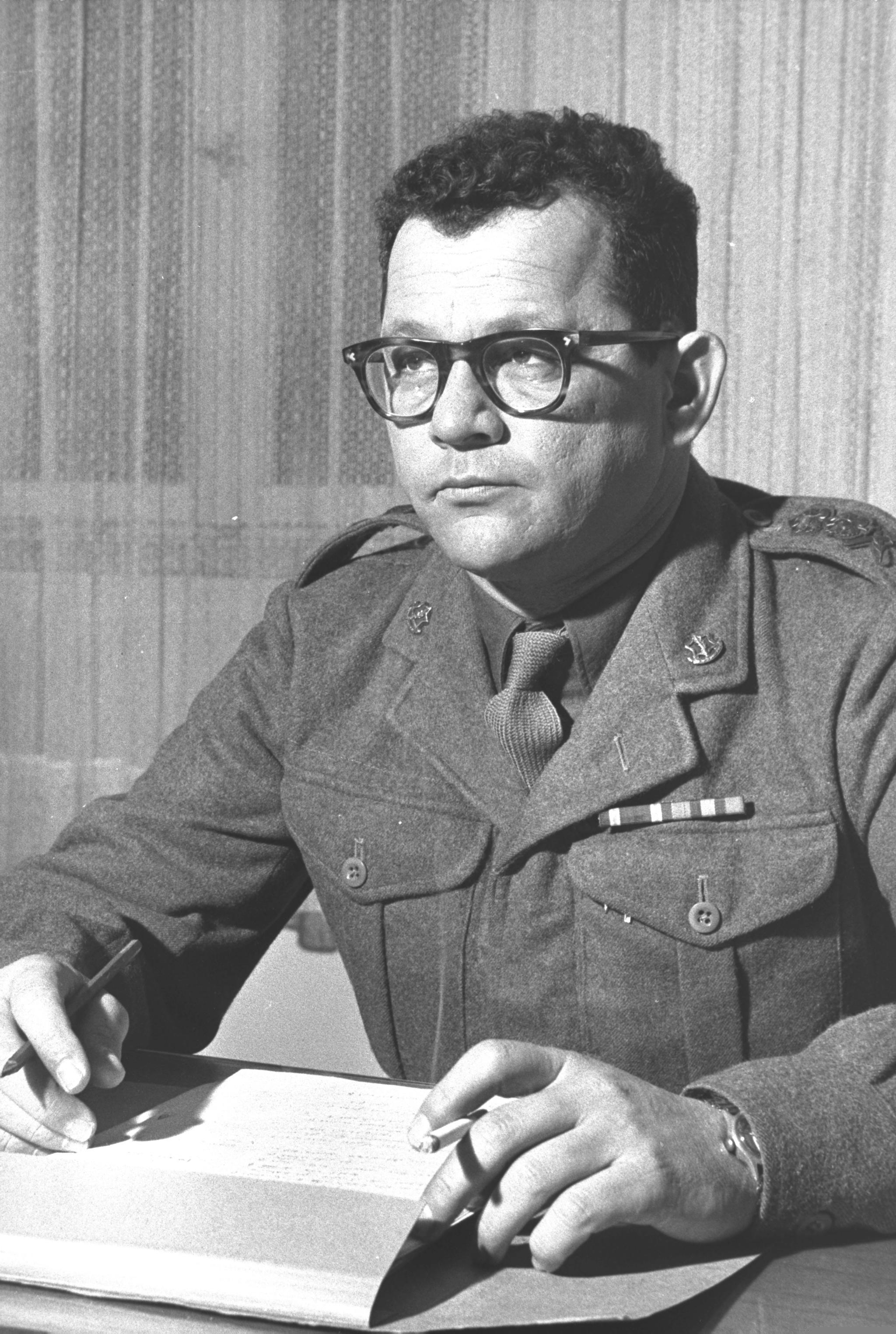
Laskov in 1958

1958

In 1958, Laskov was appointed Chief of General Staff, replacing Moshe Dayan. His appointment took place against the backdrop of the unification of Egypt and Syria as the United Arab Republic on January 31 of that year and the potential threat this posed to the security of Israel. Just two months later, on March 30, Israel and Syria exchanged heavy artillery fire across the Sea of Galilee. The clashes lasted for two days, until a ceasefire was finally achieved.

On April 24, Laskov presided over a huge military parade in Jerusalem to mark the tenth anniversary of Israel's independence. This took place despite warnings by Jordan that such a parade would be considered an act of aggression. During the parade, Laskov displayed Israel's latest military hardware, including weapons captured from Egypt in the Sinai and from Syria during clashes in the Hula Valley.

On November 6, Syria resumed its artillery bombardment of the Galilee, while Israeli workers were involved in a massive project draining Lake Huleh to obtain more agricultural land for the country. Under Laskov's orders, the IDF returned fire.

1959

One of the great scandals that occurred during Laskov's tenure was a surprise exercise to test the mobilization of the reserves, on April 1, 1959. Known as the "Night of the Ducks" (one of the coded call-up signals broadcast over the radio was "Water Fowl"), the event caused panic throughout the country, and put the armies of the neighboring Arab states on high alert. A commission of inquiry which investigated the matter found Major General Meir Zorea, Senior Staff Officer, and Major General Yehoshafat Harkabi, Chief of Military Intelligence, responsible for the fiasco, and the two resigned their posts.

1960

Tensions between Israel and Syria continued over the following months. On January 31, Israel attacked the Syrian village of Tawfik, overlooking the Sea of Galilee, claiming that it had been used by the Syrian army to bombard Israeli villages in the Galilee. Three Israeli soldiers were killed in the operation. The raid led to the outbreak of the Rotem Crisis, during which Egypt had deployed its armed forces on Israel's undefended southern border, catching Israel off guard. On March 9, Egyptian forces started to withdraw. Laskov later described the crisis as the most dramatic of his tenure as IDF Chief of the General Staff.

Legacy

Laskov resigned his position of Chief of General Staff in 1961 after a relatively peaceful tenure, marred only by clashes with the Syrians. During his term, he focused on building the strength of the IDF: Israel acquired its first submarine and its Super Mystère jets. Just before he left office, prime minister David Ben-Gurion also announced that the country had built a nuclear reactor outside the desert town of Dimona. The reactor, he claimed, was built for peaceful purposes.

Laskov established Israel's National Defense College to promote IDF generals' fluency in strategic concepts.

== Civilian career ==
In 1961, Laskov was appointed director general of the Ports Authority, and it was during his tenure that the port of Ashdod, now Israel's major port, was constructed. He also continued to write military training manuals and submitted numerous articles to military journals. In 1972, Laskov became the country's first Soldier's Ombudsman, a post he held for ten years, until his death. After the Yom Kippur War in 1973, he served on the Agranat Commission, which investigated the fiascos that led to the war.

== See also ==
- List of Israel's Chiefs of the General Staff
