= Nitza Ben-Dov =

Professor of Hebrew and comparative literature at the University of Haifa

- ניצה בן-דב
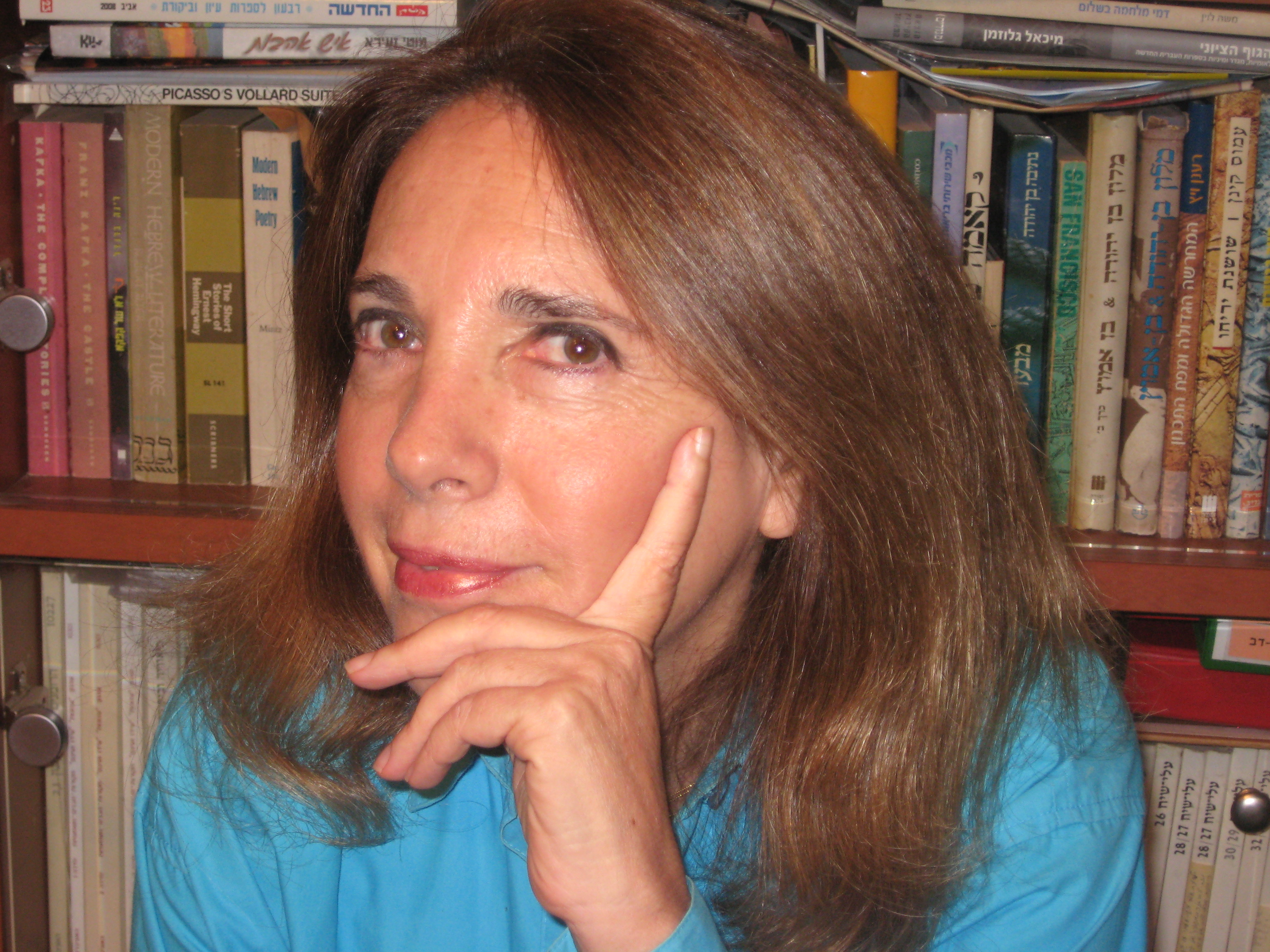
- Born: 10 March 1950 (age 76); Tel-Aviv, Israel
- Education: PhD University of California, Berkeley, 1983; BA Hebrew University of Jerusalem, 1973
- Spouse: Yosi Ben-Dov
- Awards: Yitzhak Sadeh Prize, 2018; Israel Prize, 2021
- Scientific career
- Workplaces: University of Haifa; Princeton University; The Hebrew University; University of Michigan
- Thesis: The Dream as a Junction of Theme and Characterization in the Psychological Fiction of S.Y. Agnon
- Academic advisors: Robert Alter

Nitza Ben-Dov (Hebrew: ניצה בן-דב, née Fruchtman; born 10 March 1950) is Professor of Hebrew and Comparative Literature at the University of Haifa. Winner of the 2021 Israel Prize.

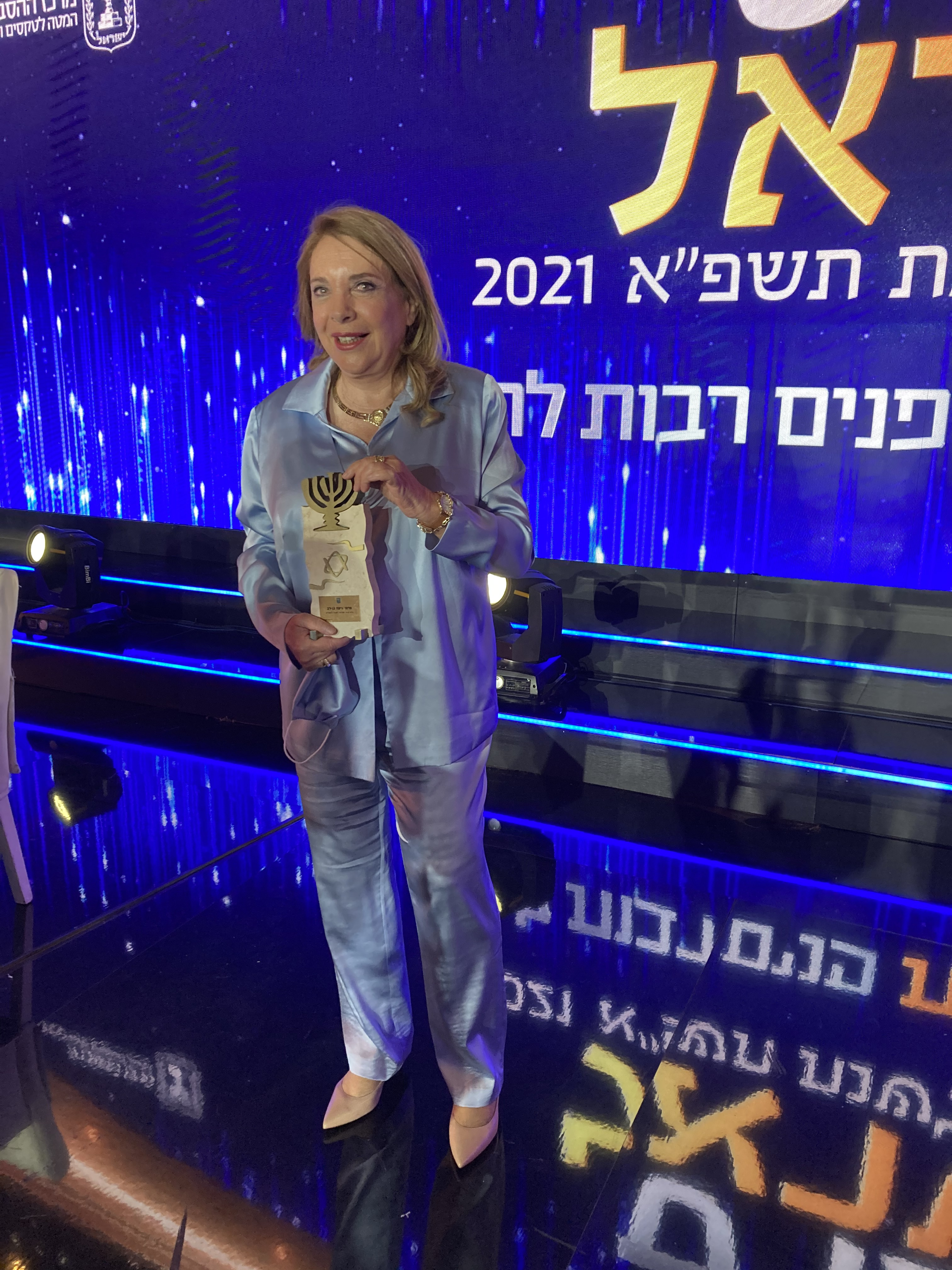
Israel Prize Ceremony, Jerusalem, April 2021

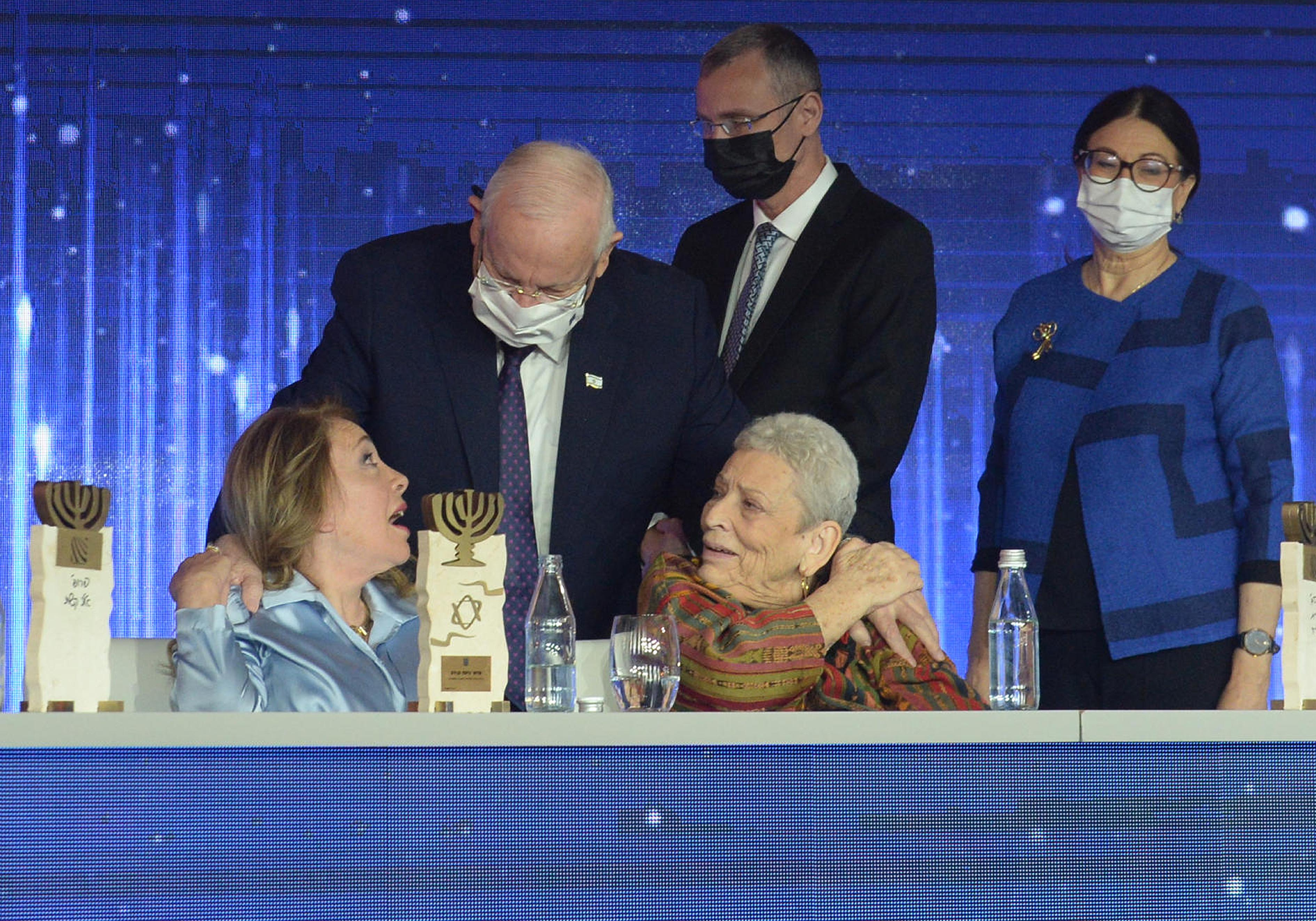
President Rivlin with Prof. Ben-Dov at the Israel Prize ceremony, Jerusalem, April 2021

== Biography ==
Nitza Ben-Dov was born in Tel Aviv to parents who were Holocaust survivors. Her father, Dov (Bernard) Fruchtman, was a teacher of literature and wrote a series of research studies on the oeuvre of S.Y. Agnon. Ben-Dov completed her secondary studies at the New High School (Tichon Hadash) in Tel Aviv in 1968. She served in the Israel Defense Forces (1968–1970) in the Nahal Brigade, at Nahal Golan.

Ben-Dov studied Hebrew Literature and Biblical Studies at the Hebrew University in Jerusalem from 1970 to 1973 and received a teaching certificate in 1974. In 1974–1983, she did a master's degree and doctorate at the University of California, Berkeley. Her doctoral dissertation was on dreams and psychology in the work of Agnon and Franz Kafka. She was an assistant professor at Princeton University from 1986 to 1989.

In 1989, she began to teach Hebrew and Comparative Literature at the University of Haifa, becoming a full professor in 1999. She has served as Editor-in-Chief of Haifa University Press/Zmora-Bitan (1996–2000) and as chair of the Academic TV channel (2001–2005). In 2006 she established the program of Women's and Gender Studies, and in 2013 the program of Cultural Studies.

In June 2023 she received the Haifa Distinguished Citizen Award.

Ben-Dov is married to Yosi Ben-Dov, the principal and managing director of the Hebrew Reali School in Haifa. They have three children and seven grandchildren.

== Research ==
Ben-Dov published books, articles, and essays on Shmuel Yosef Agnon, Abraham B. Yehoshua Amos Oz, S. Yizhar, Yehuda Amichai, Yehoshua Kenaz, Yehudit Handel, Haim Be'er, Sami Michael, Zeruya Shalev, Yehudit Rotem, Assaf Inbari and Dahlia Ravikovitch. Her research combines structuralist, feminist, psychoanalytical, and biographical elements in the work of these authors, along with intra-textual and inter-textual scrutiny.

Agnon's Art of Indirection: Uncovering Latent Content in the Fiction of S.Y Agnon, (Brill Publishers, 1993), revealed the possibility of analyzing Agnon's work (characterized by "the art of indirection", a term coined by Ben-Dov) even when translated into English. Ben-Dov has introduced Agnon to scholars of literature outside Israel and proved that it is possible to analyze word by word, through close reading, the unique nature of Agnon's work. Although the nuanced relations of the 'latent' and the 'uncovered' layers are attached through the essence of the Hebrew language, Ben-Dov illustrates that the greatness of a writer must withstand translation. The book surveys the methods, themes, and materials in Agnon's art, and deals extensively with dreams and their interpretation. It presents intersections of meaning in Agnon's writings, in which various layers are brought to light: psychoanalytical and cultural; a discussion is conducted on Biblical infrastructures, which the English reader may find in the translations of the works, in contrast to the Talmudic infrastructures.

Unhappy/unapproved Loves: Erotic Frustration, Art and Death in the Work of Agnon (Ahavot Lo Me-Usharot, 1997) enlarges the discussion of the Agnonian corpus and contains psychoanalytical discussions in the spirit of Freud and Jung; along with these are inter-textual discussions, both literary – as to the affinities between Agnon and Mann, Kafka, Voltaire, and Flaubert – and artistic-anthropological, on the affinity of the writings to the works of Rembrandt and Arnold Böcklin. The combination of methods constructs an autonomous cultural interpretation, which deciphers the Agnonian character, as well as the society out of which it arises. Common to the corpus under consideration is the theme of unfulfilled love and frustration that this invites. In this book Ben-Dov holds a dialogue with Agnon scholars and critics, and offers an original interpretation of his writing.

And It Is Your Praise: Studies in the Writings of S. Y. Agnon, A. B. Yehoshua and Amos Oz (Ve-Hi Tehilatekha, 2006) concerns particular, intra-textual research, mapping repetitive primary themes and literary formats in Agnon, Yehoshua, and Oz. It also conducts inter-textual research, singling out the tangential points of Yehoshua (to whom is devoted Ben-Dov's Hebrew book In the Opposite Direction, 1995, about the novel Mr. Mani) and Oz on the one hand, and Agnon and the other: Agnon is a 'father figure' and the creator of literary models on which Oz and Yehoshua draw. In addition, the book indicates the unique elements in the works of Oz and Yehoshua after they lay down a mature fictional mode. The writings that Ben-Dov chose to discuss are timeless.*

Written Lives: On Israeli Literary Autobiographies (Hayyim Ktuvim, 2011) is a scholarly response to the wave of autobiographic and biographic prose that has flooded Hebrew literature (and literature generally) since the early 1990s. Ben-Dov assigns Preliminaris by S. Yizhar, published in 1992, as the starting point of this salient trend in Israeli literature. In its wake came self-declared autobiographic novels: The Pure Element of Time (Havalim) by Haim Be'er (1998), A Tale of Love and Darkness (Sippur al ahava vehoshekh) by Amos Oz (2002), My Russian Grandmother and Her American Vacuum Cleaner (Ha-davar haya kakha) by Meir Shalev (2009), and Spanish Charity (Hessed sefaradi) by A.B. Yehoshua (2011). In Ben-Dov's discussion of Preliminaris and these others, she substantiates the two faces of this genre: a factual or semi-factual account tied in with a well designed written work. Ben-Dov likewise scrutinizes that dialectics of the later self-declared autobiographic work with earlier writings by these authors.

Ben-Dov studies autobiographic writings that preceded the torrent of late 20th and early 21st century: Agnon's story "The Mark" (Hasiman), the full version of which was published in 1962, the two semi-autobiographic novels by Sami Michael Refuge (Hasut) and A Handful of Fog (Hofen shel arafel), published in the late 1970s, and the complex of Dahlia Ravikovitch's prose and poetry, from which the experience of orphanhood erupts.

Written Lives also contains scholarly discussions of writings that are not purely literary, such as the Baghdad Yesterday: The Making of an Arab Jew (Bebagdad etmol), which is the memoirs of the literature scholar Sasson Somekh (2004); Yosef Haim Brenner: A Biography (Yosef Hayyim Brenner: Sippur hayyim) by the historian Anita Shapira (2008); and Home (Habayta), a novel of the kibbutz by Assaf Inbari (2009). Written Lives has a three-part Introduction and an Epilogue.*

War Lives: On the Army, Revenge, Grief and the Consciousness of War in Israeli fiction (2016) was published by Schocken. The book deals with the consciousness of war, the experiences of the army, the urge to take revenge, the place of the individual within a group, the occupier-occupier relationship and dealing with loss and bereavement as reflected in selected works in Israeli fiction, from the First World War to the eve of the Second Lebanon War. Each chapter focuses on a different issue in the existence of Jewish and Israeli living in the shadow of wars.

Where the Heart is Drawn (Schocken, 2022) is divided into nine chapters, each contains one or several sections that deal with works of a writer or literary critic: Shmuel Yosef Agnon, Yehuda Amichai, A.B. Yehoshua, Zeruya Shalev, Amos Oz, Haim Be'er, Dan Miron, Shmuel Avneri, Eliyahu Maidanik and Robert Alter.

War Lives: Revenge, Grief, and Conflict in Israeli Fiction, published by Syracuse University Press, (2024), is available on Amazon - https://a.co/d/hyNNO3D. Close readings of ten Israeli novels, exploring how issues of loss and grief, vengeance, and defeat are reflected in fiction.

== Published books ==
- Agnon's Art of Indirection: Uncovering Latent Content in the Fiction of S.Y. Agnon, Brill's Series in Jewish Studies, Leiden and New York, 1993.
- In the Opposite Direction: A Collection of Studies on Mr Mani by A. B. Yehoshua. Hakibbutz Hameuchad, 1995 (Hebrew).
- Unhappy/Unapproved Loves: Erotic Frustration, Art and Death in the Fiction of S.Y. Agnon. Am Oved, 1997 (Hebrew)
- Ve-Hi Tehilatekha (And It Is Your Praise): Studies in the Writings of S. Y. Agnon, A. B. Yehoshua and Amos Oz. Schocken, 2006 (Hebrew).
- The Amos Oz Reader. Houghton Mifflin Harcourt Publishing, 2009.
- Intersecting Perspectives: Essays on A.B. Yehoshua's Oeuvre, edited by Nitza Ben-Dov, Amir Banbaji and Ziva Shamir, United Kibbutz Press, 2010 (Hebrew).
- Written Lives: On Israeli Literary Autobiographies, Schocken, 2011 (Hebrew).
- War Lives: On the army, revenge, grief and the consciousness of war in Israeli fiction, Schocken, 2016 (Hebrew).
- Where the Heart is Drawn, Schocken, 2022 (Hebrew).
- War Lives: Revenge, Grief, and Conflict in Israeli Fiction, Syracuse University Press, 2024.
