= Avraham Biran =

Israeli archaeologist (1909–2008)

- אברהם בירן
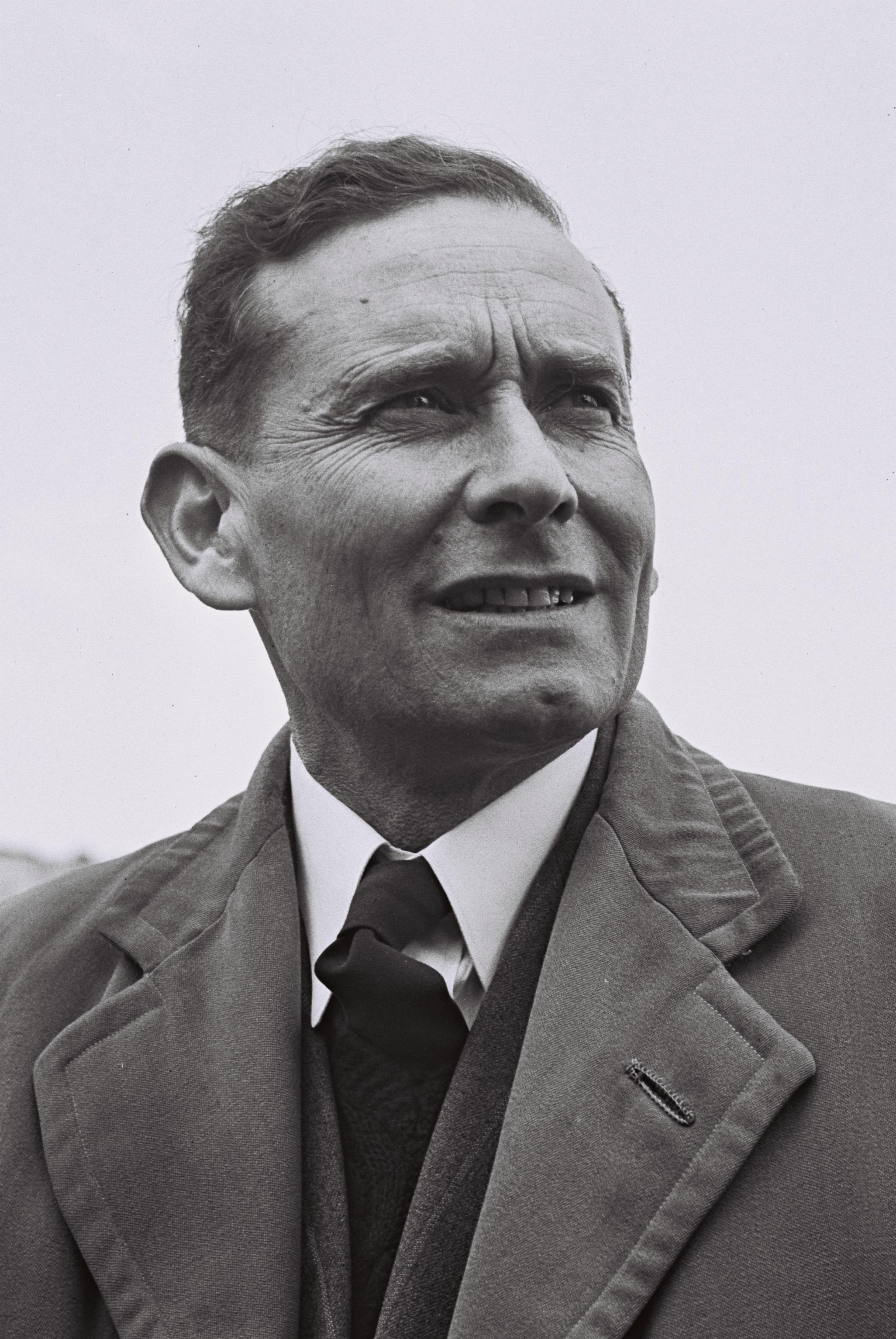
- Born: 23 October 1909; Petah Tikva, Ottoman Empire
- Died: 16 September 2008 (aged 98)
- Education: Johns Hopkins University
- Known for: Tel Dan archaeological excavation, Tel Dan Stele discovery
- Awards: Israel Prize 2002
- Scientific career
- Fields: Archaeology
- Workplaces: Institute of Archaeology at Hebrew Union College in Jerusalem
- Doctoral advisor: William F. Albright

Avraham Biran (Hebrew: אברהם בירן; born 23 October 1909 – 16 September 2008) was an Israeli archaeologist, best known for heading excavations at Tel Dan in northern Israel. He headed the Institute of Archaeology at Hebrew Union College in Jerusalem for many years.

== Biography ==
Avraham Bergman (later Biran) was born in 1909 in Petah Tikva, then part of the Ottoman Empire. He liked to refer to himself as a Mayflower Israeli, since his ancestors were among the founders of the settlement of Rosh Pina. During his youth his family moved to Egypt, where his father managed a farm in a small village. His Romanian-born great-grandfather came to Palestine decades before Theodor Herzl launched political Zionism in 1897. After his father's death the family returned to Palestine and he grew up in his grandparents house until the age of 13. He studied at the Hebrew Reali School of Haifa which he says left a lifelong impression on him. He said:

My initial interest in archaeology began when I was a student at the Reali school in Haifa, under the influence of the principal Dr. Arthur Biram, who taught us Bible combined with ancient history. During those days we went on many hikes, and we loved to hike with the Bible in hand. Among other places, we visited ancient Samaria and the archaeological digs of the American expedition; we visited Jerusalem, the Western Wall, Hebron and the Cave of the Patriarchs. I think that these were the seeds that later sprouted when Professor Albright, one of the great archaeologists, invited me to come study with him.

Afterwards, he continued his studies in the David Yellin Teachers College in Jerusalem. From 1928 to 1930 he taught in the Reali school in Haifa. In 1930 he began his studies at the University of Pennsylvania in Philadelphia and in 1931 he enrolled as a student in the department of Near Eastern Studies under Prof. William F. Albright at Johns Hopkins University in Baltimore. He received his M.A. in 1934 and his PhD in 1935.

Avraham Biran was married to Ruth, née Frankel, who died sometime in 2005 at age 94. The couple had three children: Naomi, David and Aaron (known as Roni). Avraham Biran died in 2008, at age 98, and a few months after the birth of his first great-grandchild, in Jerusalem.

== Archaeology career ==
Biran returned to Jerusalem in 1935, serving as a Fellow in the American Schools of Oriental Research until 1937, participating in a number of archaeological digs, including Tel Halifa near Aqaba, digs near the cities of Mosul and Baghdad in Iraq, Irbid in Jordan and Ras El Haruba outside Jerusalem. At the request of Yitzhak Ben-Zvi, the head of the Jewish National Council (and later the President of Israel), Biran wrote a response to an anti-Zionist tract authored by Dr. Tawfik Canaan. In 1961, Biran was appointed head of the Department of Antiquities and Museums under the Ministry of Education and Culture, a post he held until 1974. He initiated the publication of the journal "Archaeology News" in Hebrew and English. After Israel's capture of the West Bank in 1967, Biran initiated archaeological surveys in the area. He also served as the Israeli representative at the Hague Convention. At UNESCO seminars he encouraged the commencement of archaeological digs at the Western Wall and in the Jewish quarter of Jerusalem. He was instrumental in the founding of the Israel Museum in Jerusalem and he was active in the refurbishment of the Rockefeller Museum and the Shrine of the Book that contains the Qumran scrolls.

From 1974 Biran headed the Nelson Glueck School of Biblical Archaeology at Hebrew Union College in Jerusalem. In 1977 he organized an international conference on the subject of Temples and High Places in Biblical Times, publishing the results of the conference in a book with the same name in 1981. He served as a member of the organizing committee of the International Conference of Biblical Archaeology in 1984 and 1990.

In 1966, Biran began the project with which he has been most famously identified: the excavations at Tel Dan in northern Israel, where he dug for more than 30 years. The 5,000-year-old "Tel" is a mound formed by layer-upon-layer of remnants from civilizations that once occupied the site. In the Tel, Biran discovered the largest religious site ever found that dates from the Israelite period. The excavations revealed fragments from the period when the Cannanite settlement of Laish was re-settled by the Israelite tribe of Dan, although this point is based on the Bible and no evidence has proven this. Dating from the earlier period of the patriarchs, Biran excavated an arched gate, as well as a tremendous dirt wall that surrounded the city. Biran also found artifacts from the period of the Jewish monarchy – the city's defenses, walls and gates as well as the High Places of the Gate mentioned in the Bible. Biran's most important discovery at the Tel was an inscription on a slab of basalt, known as the Tel Dan Stele, that consists of 13 lines in ancient Aramaic script that mention The House of David. Regarding the significance of this inscription Hebrew University archaeologist Professor Amnon Ben-Tor said:

In this inscription, which dates to around 800 BCE, Biran believe that a king from the House of David is mentioned as being struck down in the battle with the Arameans. This is the only extra-Biblical source ever found to date that mentions the existence of the Davidic dynasty and it indeed is an extra-Biblical source that confirms the existence of David as a real historical figure. During the last few years a number of English and Scandinavian researchers have published works suggesting that the kingdoms (and figures) of David and Solomon are literary inventions rather than historical facts.

The Moore College archaeologist George Athas writes:

With regards to the Biblical texts, the Tel Dan Inscription demonstrates that there are definite historical kernels in the Bible that cannot readily be dismissed ... The Tel Dan inscription has brought us a definite step closer to finding a historical David.

== Civil service career ==
In 1937, Biran took an extended break from academia and archeology, taking up an appointment as District Officer for the Afula district and the Jezreel Valley settlements. Referring to this sudden career change Biran wrote:

In 1937, in response to the events (of the time) the Jewish settlers demanded that the British Mandate authorities appoint Jewish district officers to deal with their settlements so that they would not have to enter heavily populated Arab cities (to deal with bureaucratic affairs). The Jewish Agency offered me the position. I responded in surprise: what does an archaeologist have to do with Mandatory affairs? To which they responded: But this is the (Jezreel) Valley! so I could not refuse.

In 1938, Biran began an archaeological survey in the Beit She'an valley in conjunction with Ruth Berndstadter-Amiran. He was miraculously saved after his jeep tripped a land mine on the way to Kibbutz Tirat Zvi. In 1946, Biran was appointed District Officer for the Jerusalem district; he also served as a member of the city council of Jerusalem until the Israel's Declaration of Israel's Independence in 1948. During the waning days of the British Mandate in 1948, Biran packed up Jewish property deeds so the owners could reclaim their lands and houses following the anticipated war. He saw this act as paralleling with the experiences of another Jew who hid property titles in the Judean Hills to protect them from Roman legionnaires almost two thousand years ago.

After Israeli independence, Biran was appointed as the assistant to the cabinet secretary, also serving as the assistant military governor of Jerusalem. During this time he changed his name from Bergman to Biran. Until 1955 he served as a member of the committee overseeing the cease-fire agreement with Jordan. In 1955 Biran was appointed consul-general of Israel in Los Angeles, California.

== Views and opinions ==
Biran's opinion that Dan (ancient city), Abel-beth-maachah and the surrounding area were occupied by Israelites in the reigns of kings David and Solomon appears to have been confirmed.

Biran explained his own view of the importance of archaeology, particularly for Jews in modern-day Israel:

Israeli archaeology is important to enable us to understand the nations who lived here from prehistoric times onwards. Since the stories of the Bible are connected to this specific land, every archaeological discovery (in Israel) has significance for understanding the Bible. We wish to identify and recognize the places we heard of growing up studying the Bible in school.

Biran remained unapologetic for Israel's control of the West Bank and Jerusalem. He said:

In times of war, the victor takes over the possession of the vanquished. That's what the Jordanians did in the Old City and in the areas which they held and that is what the Israelites did after 1967.

== Awards ==
- In 1984, Biran was awarded the Schimmel Prize for Archaeology.
- In 1996, he was awarded the prize Yakir Yerushalayim (Worthy Citizen of Jerusalem).
- In 2002, he was awarded the Israel Prize, for archaeology.

== Published works ==
- Dan: 25 Years of Excavation (Hebrew), Kibbutz Hameuhad Press and the Society for the Exploration of Israel and its Antiques, 1992
- Temples and High Places in Biblical Times, Hebrew Union College Press, 1977
- Biblical Dan, Hebrew Union College, 1994
- Detailed Report on the Excavation at Tel Dan, (5 parts), Hebrew Union College Press

== See also ==
- Biblical archaeology
- Tel Dan Stele
- Syro-Palestinian archaeology
- Near Eastern archaeology
- Dating the Bible

== See also ==
- List of Israel Prize recipients
