= Gordon College of Education =

Coordinates: 32°49′29.5″N 34°58′8.9″E

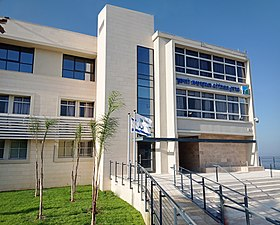
Gordon College building, 2022

Gordon College of Education is a teachers college in Haifa, Israel.

== History ==
Gordon College was established in Haifa in 1953 (73 years ago), merging the Teacher’s Seminary of the Labor Movement with the Teacher’s Seminary of the Hebrew Reali School of Haifa. The school was named for A.D. Gordon. From its foundation, it has focused on the development of teaching skills and furthered Zionist, Jewish and humanistic values. From 1953 until 1995, Gordon College was accredited to certify teachers. In 1995, it received academic accreditation to grant the Bachelor of Education Degree (B.Ed).

Gordon College is also a center of teacher’s enrichment programs for the Ministry of Education of Northern Israel.

In October 2019, it opened an International Student Program for American students offering a Bachelor’s degree in Math and Science Education (Grades 1-6), Social and Special Education, English as a Foreign Language, and Early Childhood Education.

In 2019, the school had a student body of 2,500. Notable alumni include Hava Lazarus-Yafeh.

== See also ==
- Education in Israel
