= Meir Zorea =

IDF general and Israeli politician

- מאיר זורע
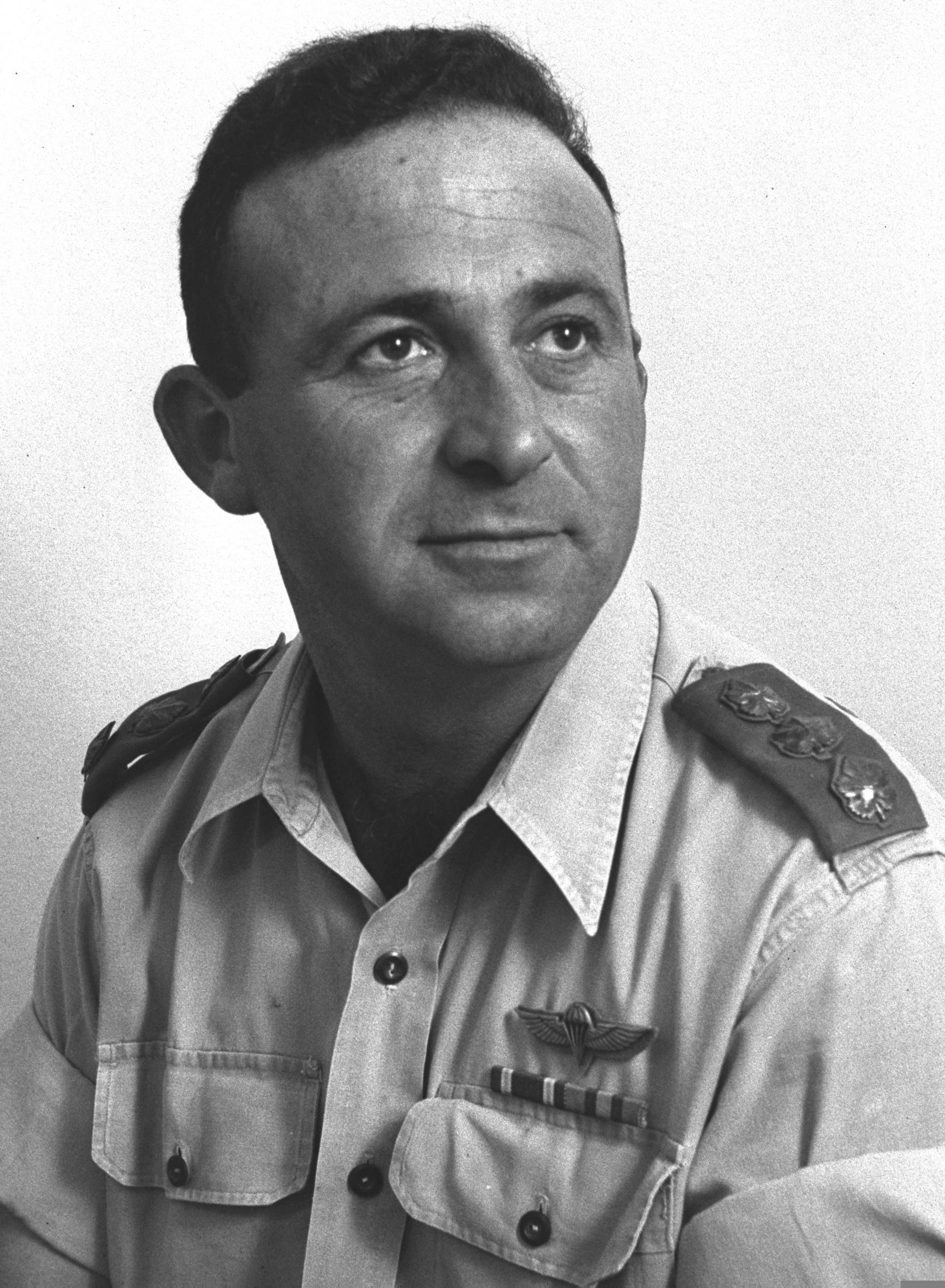

Faction represented in the Knesset
- 1977–1978: Democratic Movement for Change

Personal details
- Born: 14 March 1923 Chişinău, Romania
- Died: 24 June 1995 (aged 72) Ma'agan Michael, Israel

Meir "Zarro" Zorea MC (Hebrew: מאיר זורע; born Meyer Zarodinsky (Hebrew: מאיר זארודינסקי) 14 March 1923 – 24 June 1995) was a general in the Israel Defense Forces (IDF) and later a member of the Knesset. He earned distinction through his combat actions in World War II and in the 1948 Arab-Israeli War. He was a founder of Democratic Movement for Change, an initially successful but short-lived centrist party.

== Early life ==
Zorea was born in Chişinău, Bessarabia (then part of the Kingdom of Romania, now in Moldova) in 1923, and moved with his parents to Mandatory Palestine in 1925. He studied at the Alliance school in Tel Aviv and the Hebrew Reali School in Haifa. He joined the Haganah at age 16, and was a member of the Special Night Squads and Notrim. After completing his studies, he enlisted in the British Army in 1942 during World War II. He served with the 20th company of the Buffs, which was recruited from Palestine's Jews, and after September 1944 the Jewish Brigade, a brigade group of the British Army composed of Jews from Palestine led by British-Jewish officers. During late winter in 1945, the Jewish Brigade took part in combat against the German Army at the Senio River Valley near Bologna, Italy. After two difficult months, the brigade emerged from the engagement battered, yet victorious. Then a Second Lieutenant, Zorea was awarded the British Military Cross for leading his men through intense fire, allowing spotters to pinpoint German positions. Eventually, Zorea attained the rank of Captain before the brigade was dissolved in 1946.

Some Haganah members among the Jewish Brigade soldiers, used the brigade as a front for Haganah underground operations, including arms smuggling to the Haganah in Mandatory Palestine, directing European Jewish Holocaust survivors in emigration to Palestine (see Beriha), and executing Nazi officials and military officers. Zorea took part in all of these activities. Regarding emigration to Palestine, Zorea remarked:

We had a net over the whole of Europe, which was then about five million people of all nations and denominations who were moving from place to place, and we directed our streams toward Palestine.

To facilitate execution of Nazis, Jewish Brigade members would traverse post-war Europe in bands of three and four. Zorea explained:

We only eliminated those directly involved in the slaughter of Jews. At first we put a bullet through their heads. Then we strangled them. With our bare hands. We never said anything before we killed them. Not why or who we were. We just killed them like you kill a bug.

== IDF service ==
Dozens of former Jewish Brigade members were called upon to lead the Israel Defense Forces (IDF) in anticipation of the impending 1948 Arab-Israeli War. During the 1948 war, Zorea served as a battalion commander. Later, Zorea served on the General Staff as the head of the training department. He also served as commander of the IDF Officer School.

Zorea retired from the army in 1953, and he was later recommissioned in 1956. He went on to positions as Deputy Commander and later commander of the IDF Armored Corps, and Director of Operations. At the time, Zorea was considered a candidate for eventual appointment as Chief of General Staff, the highest position in the IDF.

In 1959, after the Night of the Ducks scandal that brought Israel to domestic and foreign crisis, Zorea was removed from his position as director of operations. He was reassigned as commander of Northern Command, succeeding Yitzhak Rabin, who in turn replaced Zorea as the new director of operations.

In 1962, Zorea retired from the IDF as a major-general. He participated in the Israeli capture of Adolf Eichmann, who stood trial and was later executed. Later on, during the 1967 Six-Day War, Zorea led his tank corps into the Sinai Peninsula to capture Sharm el-Sheikh from Egyptian forces. In the 1980s, Zorea was involved in the investigation of the Bus 300 affair, wherein some Israeli soldiers were suspected of summarily executing two captured Palestinian bus hijackers.

== Political activity ==
Zorea remained active in service of the State of Israel well after retirement from the military. From 1973 to 1974, Zorea served as Soldiers' Ombudsman. From 1976 to 1977, he served as director of the Israel Lands Authority. While originally a member of the left-wing Mapam Party, Zorea joined with Professor Yigael Yadin in 1976 to form Democratic Movement for Change, a centrist party formed by an alliance of former members of the Alignment and Likud parties. One of the party's stated goals was to introduce a national constitution into Israeli Law.

Zorea was elected to the Knesset in the 1977 elections in which Dash won 15 seats (making it the third largest in the Knesset), and the party joined Menachem Begin's coalition government. While serving in the Knesset, Zorea became a member of the House Committee, the Finance Committee, and the Foreign Affairs & Defense Committee. However, the party began to disintegrate and Zorea resigned from the Knesset in 1978, less than a year after entering it. In 1984 he headed a committee of inquiry into the Bus 300 Affair.

== Personal life ==
Zorea was married to Naomi Weinstock, a sister of Shulamith Shahar. They had six children and adopted a seventh child who was a Yemenite Jewish immigrant. Two of their sons were killed in action while serving in the IDF. Their son Yonatan, a fighter pilot in the Israeli Air Force, was killed over the Golan Heights during the Six-Day War, and their son Yohanan, an armored battalion operations officer, was killed in combat on the Golan Heights during the Yom Kippur War. Their eldest son Giora was the commander of Sayeret Matkal and the Israeli Intelligence Corps.

Zorea was a founder of kibbutz Ma'agan Michael and lived there. He was a member of the Israeli Scouts Movement. He died of throat cancer in 1995 at the age of 72.
