= Miriam Ben-Peretz =

Israeli professor (1927–2020)

- מרים בן פרץ
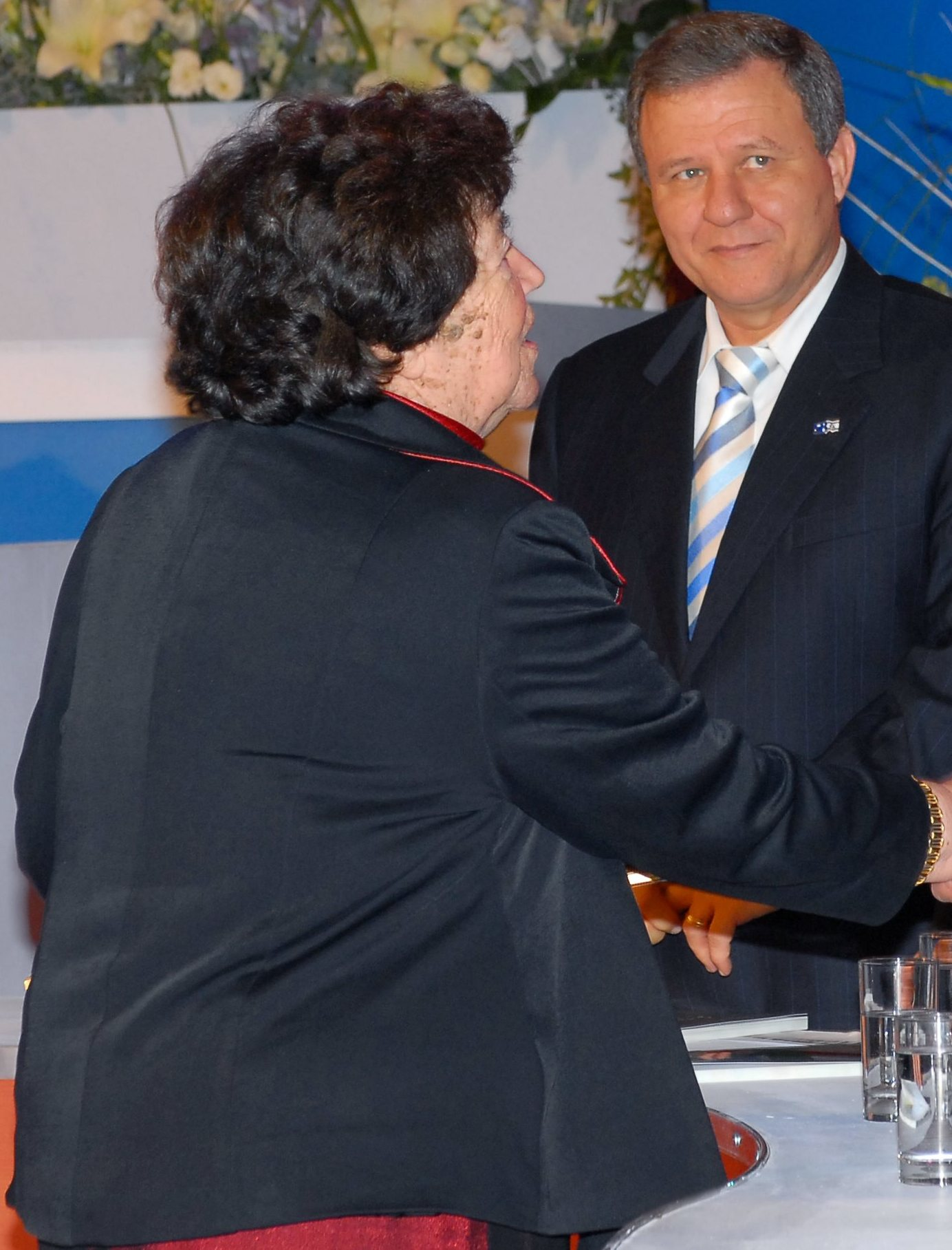
- Born: 1 April 1927 (age 99); Breslau, Germany
- Education: Hebrew University (B.S., 1958); Hebrew University (Ph.D., 1977)
- Awards: Israel Prize (2006)

Miriam Ben-Peretz (Hebrew: מרים בן פרץ; born April 1, 1927 - July 15, 2020) is an Israeli academician specializing in education. Ben-Peretz is Professor Emeritus of Education at the University of Haifa and is a 2006 winner of the Israel Prize in the field of education. She is former Dean of the School of Education at the University of Haifa, and past President of Tel-Hai Academic College. In 1997 Ben-Peretz was awarded the Lifetime Achievement Award by the American Educational Research Association.

== Early life and education ==
Ben-Peretz was born to Israel Abraham and Else Ester Rabin in Breslau, Germany. She moved to Israel in 1935, and graduated from the Hebrew Reali School in Haifa. She married Joseph Koffler in 1947 who, as a young husband, departed with the Lamed Heh, never to return. She married Moshe Ben-Peretz in 1949. After moving to Israel, she received her Bachelor of Science with distinction from 1958, a Master of Science with distinction in 1969, and Doctor of Philosophy in 1977, all from Hebrew University in Jerusalem.

== Career ==
Ben-Peretz has held a variety of roles in academia and education. She was at first a high school biology teacher. She was an Instructor at University Haifa, Israel from 1964 to 1975, and progressed through roles as senior lecturer, associate professor, and then professor as of 1990. She has also held several international assignments, including visiting professor at the University of Toronto, University of Alberta, University of Oslo, University of Mainz, Stanford University, and Michigan State University.

She served as chair of the department of teacher education at University Haifa from 1978 to 1985, and dean of the School of Education from 1988 to 1993. She was president of Tel-Hai College from 1994 to 1996 and head of the Center for Jewish Education at University Haifa.

Her lifetime achievement award from AERA was based in part on her leadership in the creation of a clearinghouse for educational professional development in Israel that serves as an international model.

== Israel Prize ==
In 2006 Ben-Peretz received the Israel Prize. The judges, in their deliberation, noted that she is a "leading authority" in the areas of teaching, curriculum design, teacher education and professional development, whose contributions to the field had impact not only in Israel but internationally. The Israel Prize (Hebrew: פרס ישראל) is an award handed out by the State of Israel and is generally regarded as the state's highest honor. It is presented annually, on Israeli Independence Day, in a state ceremony in Jerusalem, in the presence of the President, the Prime Minister, the Speaker of the Knesset (Israel's legislature), and the Supreme Court President. The prize was set up in 1953 at the initiative of the Minister of Education Ben-Zion Dinor.
