= Fahoum Fahoum =

Arab-Israeli peace activist

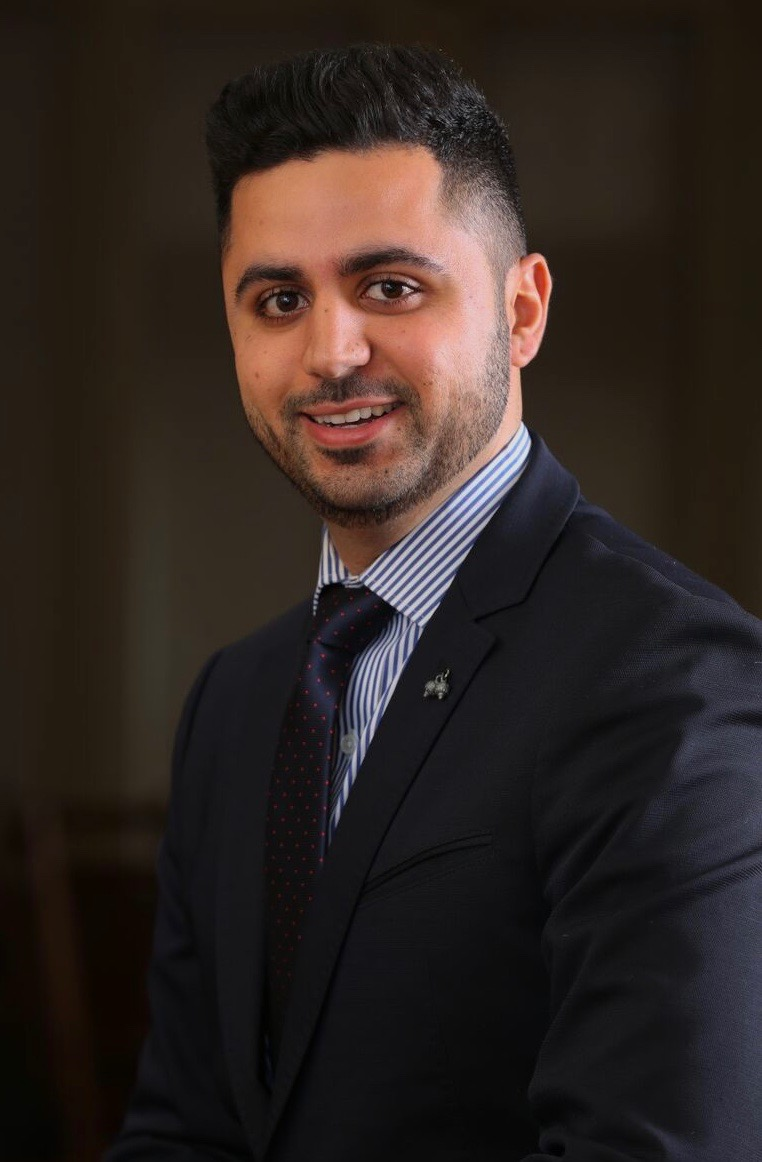
Fahoum Fahoum

Fahoum Fahoum (Arabic: فاهوم فاهوم, Hebrew: פאהום פאהום) is a Palestinian citizen of Israel and peace activist from Haifa. Fahoum promoted peace building initiatives through sport, receiving two congressional awards, one of which from Congresswoman Shelley Berkley in 2001. Fahoum represented the national junior tennis team in European and world championships, and followed by competing in collegiate tennis.

== Education ==
He graduated high school in 2009 from the Hebrew Reali School in Haifa, majoring in economics and psychology, and received his Bachelor of Arts in Public Relations from Quinnipiac University in Hamden, CT in May 2014. Fahoum received his Masters in Negotiation and Conflict Resolution from Columbia University in 2016. His research focused on the use of sport as a means to advance positive inter-group relations. He later published his findings and personal testimony in the Wall Street Journal.

== Athletic career ==
Growing up in Haifa, Fahoum played tennis at the Israel Tennis Center. When he was 12, Fahoum was training at the Wingate Institute south of Netanya. Fahoum competed on a national and international level, including some of the highest stages of junior tennis; he represented the national team at the Junior Davis Cup, Les Petits As and the Orange Bowl tournaments. He played tennis at the Old Dominion University between 2009 and 2012. In 2012 he transferred to Quinnipiac University.
