= Yosi Ben-Dov =

Israeli headmaster

- יוסי בן-דב
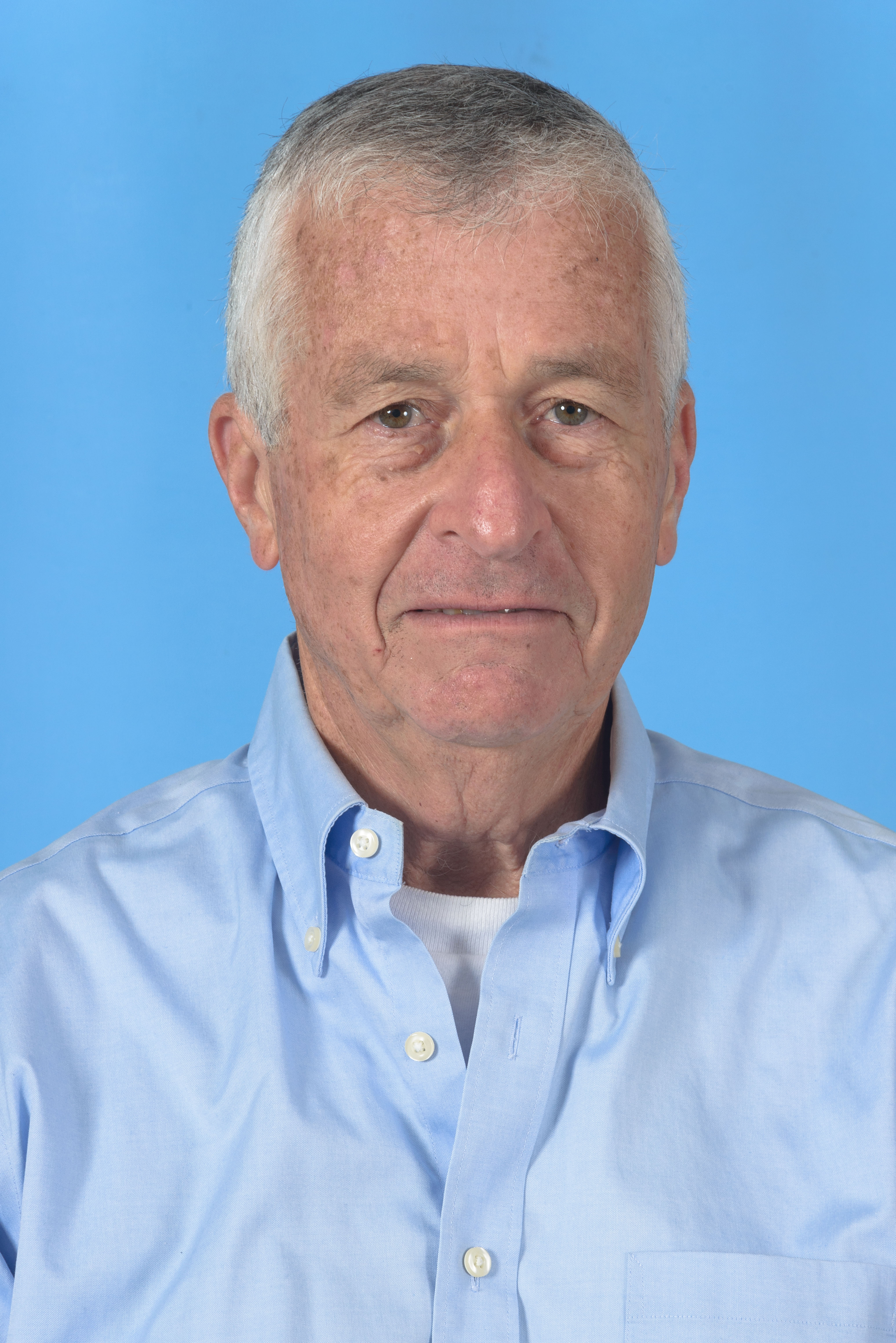
- Born: 9 November 1950 (age 75); Haifa, Israel
- Education: PhD University of California, Berkeley, 1977; BSc Hebrew University of Jerusalem, 1974; The Hebrew Reali School
- Spouse: Nitza Ben-Dov
- Scientific career
- Workplaces: The Hebrew University; Michigan State University; The Wharton School of the University of Pennsylvania
- Thesis: Optimal Testing Procedures for Coherent Systems
- Academic advisors: Richard Barlow

Yosi Ben-Dov (Hebrew: יוסי בן-דב) is an Israeli educator, manager and university lecturer.

== Biography ==
Ben-Dov was born in Haifa, Israel in 1950. He studied at The Hebrew Reali School from 1956 to 1968, and was active at the Israel Boy and Girl Scouts Federation (Tzofim) youth movement. He served the army at a "Nahal" unit, establishing kibbutz and Israeli settlement Mevo Hama at the southern part of the Golan Heights.

=== Academic life ===
Ben-Dov did his undergraduate studies at the Hebrew University of Jerusalem in Mathematics, Statistics and Economics. He later joined the PhD program at the Industrial Engineering and Operations Research (IEOR) department of the University of California, Berkeley, where he studied from 1973 to 1977, receiving a Ph.D. in Operations Research in 1977. His thesis, Optimal Testing Procedures for Coherent Systems, was written under the supervision of Prof. Richard E. Barlow. Later Ben-Dov taught at Michigan State University, at the Hebrew University of Jerusalem and at the Wharton School of the University of Pennsylvania.

=== Professional career ===
In 1986 Ben-Dov started working on Wall Street at Prudential Securities as the managing director of the Financial Strategies Group. In 1991 he was the Director of the Rappaport Institute near the Rambam Hospital and in 1995 he joined Amdocs as a Senior Vice President in charge of the Haifa branch in Israel.

In 1999 Ben-Dov became the CEO of Schema, a Wireless Optimization company which was later acquired by TEOCO, and in 2008 became the CEO of Time To Know, an education technology company that provided a holistic service to the K–12 classroom, which included a Digital Teaching Platform together with interactive core curriculum.

Ben-Dov became the principal and managing director of The Hebrew Reali School in Haifa at the beginning of 2014. During his tenure he has been involved in a funding dispute with the education ministry. On September 1, 2017, a new building was inaugurated at the Ahuza branch of the Reali School, donated by the Heichal Eliyahu organization. The building has classrooms, an auditorium and a center for Jewish-Israeli culture. In October 2018, makerspaces were inaugurated at the school thanks to a contribution by Dr. Miriam Adelson, who attended the real school from first to twelfth grade, and her husband Sheldon Adelson. In the Corona year (2021-2020) the Reali School excelled in managing distance learning by adopting “hybrid learning” conducted in all school classrooms using quality cameras that captured classroom lessons and large TV screens that allowed teachers to follow and share the class with students at home. During that year, the traditional Memorial Day ceremony, which includes all 4,200 students of the school each year, as well as many thousands of graduates, was broadcast live for the first time. In September 2021, two more kindergartens were opened in the "Realigan" chain, bringing the number of kindergartens in the chain to eight.

=== Personal life ===
Ben-Dov is married to Prof. Nitza Ben-Dov, the 2021 recipient of the prestigious Israel Prize for Literary Criticism. They have three children: Merav, Michal and Jacob. They live in Haifa, Israel.

== Publications ==
- Ben-Dov, Yosi (1980). "Optimal reliability design of k-out-of-n systems subject to two kinds of failure". Journal of the Operational Research Society. 31 (8): 743–748. doi:10.1057/jors.1980.137. S2CID 62526234.
- Ben-Dov, Yosi (1981). "Optimal testing procedures for special structures of coherent systems". Management Science. 27 (12): 1410–1420. doi:10.1287/mnsc.27.12.1410.
- Ben-Dov, Yosi (1981). "A branch and bound algorithm for minimizing the expected cost of testing coherent systems". European Journal of Operational Research. 7 (3): 284–289. doi:10.1016/0377-2217(81)90350-7.
- Shilony, Yuval; Ben-Dov, Yosi (1981). "Power and importance in a theory of lobbying". Behavioral Science. 27 (1): 69–76. doi:10.1002/bs.3830270107.
- Assaf, David; Ben-Dov, Yosi; Krieger, Abba M. (1986). "Optimal design of systems subject to two types of error". Operations Research. 34 (4): 550–553. doi:10.1287/opre.34.4.550.
- Ben-Dov, Yosi; Hayre, Lakhbir; Pica, Vincent (1992). "Mortgage valuation models at Prudential Securities". Interfaces. 22 (1): 55–71. doi:10.1287/inte.22.1.55.
