= Hava Lazarus-Yafeh =

Israeli Islamic Studies scholar, educator

Hava Lazarus–Yafeh
- חוה לצרוס-יפה
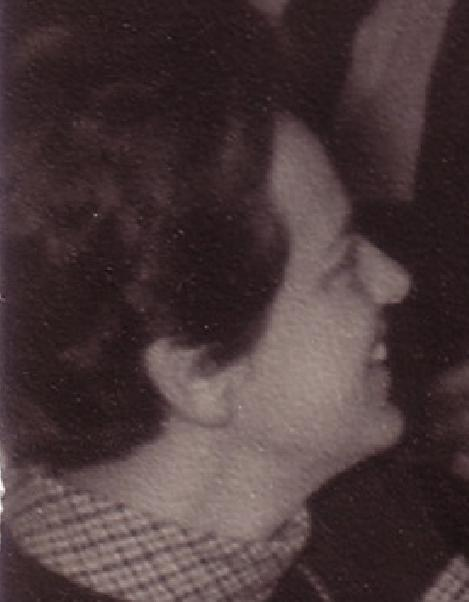
- Born: Hava Lazarus; May 6, 1930; Wiesbaden, Province of Hesse-Nassau, Weimar Republic
- Died: September 6, 1998 (aged 68); Jerusalem, Israel
- Burial place: Mount of Olives Jewish Cemetery
- Education: Hebrew University of Jerusalem
- Occupations: Orientalist, scholar, editor, educator
- Spouse: Immanuel Yafeh
- Father: Paul Lazarus (Rabbi)
- Awards: Israel Prize (1993)

Hava Lazarus–Yafeh (Hebrew: חוה לצרוס-יפה; 1930–1998) was a German-born Israeli Orientalist, scholar, editor, and educator. She known for her work in medieval and modern Islamic Studies and interfaith relations. Lazarus–Yafeh was a professor and a head of the Department for Islamic Civilization at the Hebrew University of Jerusalem. She won the Israel Prize in history in 1993.

== Biography ==
Hava Lazarus was born on May 6, 1930, in Wiesbaden, Province of Hesse-Nassau, Weimar Republic (present-day Germany) to a Jewish family. Her mother was Jadwiga Walfisz, a teacher; and her father was a noted German Rabbi Paul Lazarus (Rabbi). In November 1938, the Wiesbaden Synagogue, where her father had recently retired from, was destroyed on Kristallnacht. In February 1939, the Lazarus family emigrated to Mandatory Palestine. She attended Hebrew Reali School in Haifa. In 1954 she married teacher Immanuel Yafeh.

Lazarus–Yafeh graduated in 1950 from Gordon College of Education (formerly Haifa Teachers' College). She completed her BA degree in 1953, and MA degree in 1958 at the Hebrew University of Jerusalem. Her Ph.D. was completed in 1966 under the supervision of David Hartwig Baneth, the title of her Ph.D. dissertation was "The Literary Character of Al-Ghazzali's Writings: Studies in the Language of Al-Ghazzali".

She started teaching at the Hebrew University of Jerusalem in 1962, while she was a student. She was a post-doctoral fellow and visiting researcher at Harvard University in Cambridge, Massachusetts from 1965 to 1966. She served as the head of the Department for Islamic Civilization at Hebrew University of Jerusalem from 1968 to 1971.

She died on September 6, 1998, in Jerusalem.

== Publications ==
=== Books ===
- Lazarus-Yafeh, Hava (1965). The Literary Character of Al-Ghazzali's Writings: Studies in the Language of Al-Ghazzali (dissertation). Hebrew University of Jerusalem. OCLC 19137767.
- Lazarus-Yafeh, Hava (1981). Some Religious Aspects of Islam. Numen Book Series. Vol. 42. Brill. doi:10.1163/9789004378605. ISBN 978-90-04-06329-7.
- Lazarus-Yafeh, Hava (1992). Intertwined Worlds: Medieval Islam and Bible Criticism. Princeton University Press. ISBN 9780691073989.

=== Articles and chapters ===
- Lazarus-Yafeh, Hava (January 1966). "Some Neglected Aspects of Medieval Muslim Polemics against Christianity". The Harvard Theological Review. 89 (1). Cambridge University Press: 61–84. doi:10.1017/S0017816000031813. JSTOR 1509996. S2CID 162692324.
- Lazarus-Yafeh, Hava (January 1988). "Reviewed Work: Between Muslim and Jew: The Problem of Symbiosis under Early Islam by Steven M. Wasserstrom". Journal of the American Oriental Society. 118 (1): 97–98. doi:10.2307/606318. JSTOR 606318.

=== As editor ===
- Lazarus-Yafeh, Hava; Cohen, Mark R.; Somekh, Sasson; Griffth, Sidney H., eds. (1999). The Majlis: Interreligious Encounters in Medieval Islam. Wiesbaden, Germany: Otto Harrassowitz Verlag. ISBN 9783447040419.
