= Night of the Ducks =

1959 civilian fiasco in Israel

The Night of the Ducks (Hebrew: ליל הברווזים) was the civilian fiasco by the Israel Defense Forces (IDF) that occurred on April 1, 1959.

Traditionally, Israel conducted regular call-up exercises for its reserve troops by public radio. Units were given code words, which, if broadcast over the radio, meant that the troops were to assemble at predetermined meeting points. Though intended for emergency use, exercises were conducted to ensure that the troops arrived at their appointed places within a reasonable amount of time. Because of the tense situation along the country's borders, drills were announced publicly well in advance, and people expecting to be called up waited at home for the announcements to be made.

By the late 1950s, however, tensions had been increasing along Israel's frontiers, not least because of the perceived threat posed by the political unification of the country's two major adversaries, Egypt and Syria, as the United Arab Republic on January 31, 1958. As a result, it was decided by the IDF's General Staff to test the readiness of its reserve troops under actual emergency conditions. A call-up exercise would be conducted, but unlike previous exercises, there would be no prior announcement and no warning given.

On April 1, a popular radio program on Kol Israel was interrupted by a message requesting listeners to stay close to their radios and wait for an important announcement. At 9:00 PM, Kol Israel's main radio program opened with an announcement of a general call-up of the reserves, and all reservists whose units were announced were requested to report to their bases the following day. The message was concluded with three military code words, which signaled units to report at their predetermined meeting points. The message was delivered in nine languages.

Intended to simulate genuine emergency conditions, the call-up announcement threw the country into a panic. People believed that the call-up was in response to a genuine emergency, and that the country was under attack. In the following hours, Israelis spread rumors and guesses, and checked their personal ammunition supply. In the Knesset, members received the news during a vote on the state budget, and quickly abandoned the proceedings and ran to their cars to listen to the radio.

Less than a quarter of an hour after the broadcast, radio programs from all over the world began announcing that Israel was mobilizing its army. Urgent messages were sent to foreign reporters in Israel, most of whom were attending a festival at Tel Aviv's Cultural Center celebrating a state visit to Israel by Queen Elisabeth of Belgium. IDF Chief of Staff Haim Laskov and Chief of Reserves Meir Zorea were also attending. Israeli Prime Minister David Ben-Gurion had been entertaining Queen Elisabeth when the crisis began.

Similarly, the neighboring Arab states, which monitored Israeli radio, believed that Israel was preparing to launch a surprise attack on them, and began to ready their own troops. Syria began moving troops to the Israeli border to prepare for an IDF attack. It took considerable efforts by the government to calm the civilian population, and international efforts to mollify the neighboring states and convince them that Israel was not preparing for war.

At 11:00 PM, Kol Israel finally announced that the call-up had been just an exercise, but people in Israel and abroad began forming conspiracy theories. For example, Soviet media claimed that the mobilization was possibly "to divert the workers' attention and to allow the government to insert into the defense clause of the budget IL420 million, more than the previous year".

In the following days, the local press responded bitterly to the event, referring to it as the "Night of the Ducks", since one of the call-up codes repeated on the radio was "Waterfowl", which in Hebrew translates as "water ducks". An official Commission of Inquiry was organized to investigate the decisions leading up to the event. Although the Chief of Staff, Haim Laskov, was absolved, two leading generals, Major General Meir Zorea, who served as Chief of Reserves, and Major General Yehoshafat Harkabi, who served as Chief of Military Intelligence, were forced to step down.

According to Israeli military historian Yoav Gelber, Laskov told him years later that the call-ups were in fact intended as a trap. Egyptian reconnaissance planes flew night missions over Israel at the time, photographing the target areas and withdrawing before the Israeli Air Force had mobilized to intercept them. As a result, the Israeli Air Force's commander, Ezer Weizman, decided to set up an ambush. A reserve call-up would be announced to draw in Egyptian aircraft that would be shot down by waiting Israeli fighters. However, the Egyptian aircraft never came.
