= David Shahar =

Israeli writer (1926-1997)

- דוד שחר
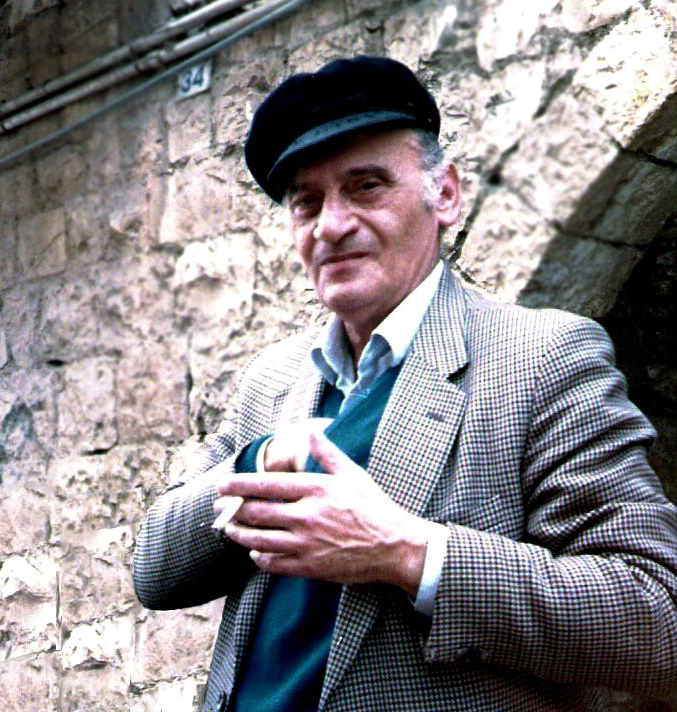
- Born: David Shahar; 17 June 1926; Jerusalem, Mandatory Palestine
- Died: 2 April 1997 (aged 70); Paris
- Resting place: Mount of Olives Jewish Cemetery
- Occupation: writer
- Spouse: Shulamith Weinstock
- Writing career
- Language: Hebrew
- Genres: Novels, Short stories
- Notable work: Heichal HaKelim HaShevurim (The Palace of Shattered Vessels)
- Notable awards: Agnon Prize (1973), Prix Médicis Etranger (1981)

David Shahar (Hebrew: דוד שחר; 1926-1997) was an Israeli fiction writer, translator, and editor best known for his depiction of old Jerusalem in the multi-volume historical saga The Palace of Shattered Vessels (1968–94).

== Life and work ==
He was born in Jerusalem in June 1926, to a pious ultra-orthodox Jewish family that had lived in the city for several generations. His ancestors arrived in Jerusalem in the 19th century, from Hungary on his father's side and the Russian Empire on his mother's side. According to family stories, his father's side was descended from Jews expelled from Spain in 1492.

Shahar studied at the Hebrew University in Jerusalem. He was involved with the Irgun Tzvai Leumi and the Canaanite movement, and identified as an Orthodox Jewish, ultranationalist, right-wing writer.

"[Shahar's] depiction of Jerusalem during the British Mandate period . . . projects a sociocultural world that does not embody any historically defined ideological position in the context of the debate around and within Zionism. . . . His mimetic enterprise may be characterized as the personal recreation of an alternative sociocultural world whose demise he elegizes."

— Michal Peled Ginsburg and Moshe Ron, Shattered vessels: memory, identity, and creation in the work of David Shahar, x

Shahar's series of novels The Palace of Shattered Vessels is recognized by many as his masterpiece, considered a realist depiction of life in pre-State Jerusalem. Regarded as an Israeli version of Proust by French and some Israeli critics, he won the Prix Medicis Etranger and the title of Commander in the Ordre des Arts et des Lettres. He also won Israeli literary awards such as the Bialik Prize, the Agnon Prize and the Prime Minister's Prize for Hebrew Literary Works.

He had two children with the medieval historian Shulamith Shahar, one of them was the Israelian sinologist, Meir Shahar. He died in Paris in 1997. Poet and chemist Avner Treinin spoke at his funeral when Shahar was buried on the Mount of Olives.

== Works ==
=== Short story collections ===
- Concerning Dreams (1955) [Al Ha-Chalomot]
- Caesar (1960) [Keisar]
- The Fortune Teller (1966) [Magid Ha-Atidot]
- The Death of the Little God (1970) [Moto Shel Ha-Elohim Ha-Katan]
- The Popeʹs Moustache (1971) [Sfamo Shel Ha-Apifyor]

=== Novels ===
- Moon of Honey and Gold (1959) [Yerach Ha-Dvash Ve-Ha-Zahav]
- Riki’s Secret (1960) [Sodo Shel Riki: Harpatkotav Shel Riki Maoz]
- Summer in the Street of the Prophets [The Palace of Shattered Vessels, vol. 1] (1969) [Kayitz Be-Derech Ha-Neviʹim]
- A Voyage to Ur of the Chaldees [The Palace of Shattered Vessels, vol. 2] (1971) [Ha-Masa Le-Ur Kasdim]
- The Day of the Countess [The Palace of Shattered Vessels, vol. 3] (1976) [Yom Ha-Rozenet]
- His Majestyʹs Agent (1979) [Sochen Hod Malchuto]
- Nin-Gal [The Palace of Shattered Vessels, vol. 4] (1983) [Ningal; Nin-Gal]
- Day of the Ghosts [The Palace of Shattered Vessels, vol. 5] (1986) [Yom Ha-Refaʹim]
- A Tammuz Nightʹs Dream [The Palace of Shattered Vessels, vol. 6] (1988) [Chalom Leil Tammuz]
- Nights of Lutetia [The Palace of Shattered Vessels] (1991) [Leilot Lutetzia]
- On Candles and Winds [The Palace of Shattered Vessels, vol. 7] (1994) [Al Ha-Ner Ve-Al Ha-Ruach]
- To the Mount of Olives (posthumously published fragment) (1998)

=== Translations into Hebrew ===
- Selected Scandinavian Stories (1953) [Mivḥar Ha-Sipur ha-Skandinavi]
- Selected Japanese Stories edited by Donald Keene (1957) [Mivḥar Ha-Sipur Ha-Yapani]
- Napoleon's Letters edited by J. M. Thompson (196-?) [Mikhteve Napoleon]
- Zen Wisdom (1971) [Hokhmat Zen]
- The Power and the Glory by Graham Greene (1991) [Ha-Oz Veha-Tiferet]

=== Books in English translation ===
- News from Jerusalem: Stories, trans. Dalya Bilu, et al. (Boston: Houghton Mifflin, 1973)
- The Palace of Shattered Vessels, trans. Dalya Bilu (Boston: Houghton Mifflin, 1975) [vol. 1, Summer in the Street of the Prophets]
- His Majesty's Agent, trans. Dalya Bilu (New York: Harcourt Brace Jovanovich, 1980)
- The Palace of Shattered Vessels: Summer in the Street of the Prophets; and, A Voyage to Ur of the Chaldees, trans. Dalya Bilu (New York: Weidenfeld & Nicolson, 1988) [vols. 1 and 2]
