= Yehoshafat Harkabi =

Academic and IDF intelligence commander

- יהושפט הרכבי
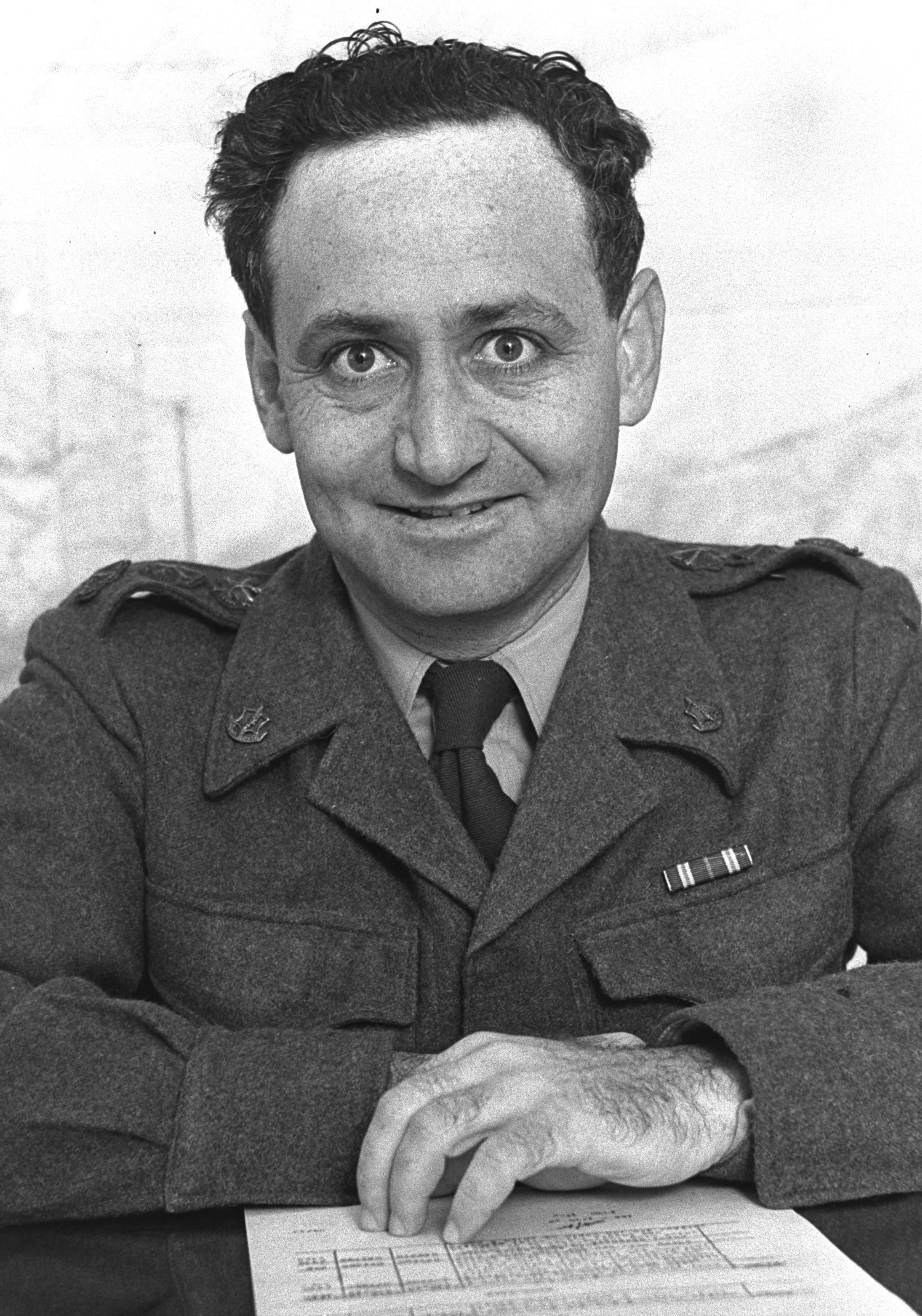
- Born: 21 September 1921; Haifa, Mandatory Palestine
- Died: 26 August 1994 (aged 72); Jerusalem, Israel
- Resting place: Mount Herzl
- Education: Harvard University
- Known for: Chief of Israeli Military Intelligence
- Awards: Israel Prize

Yehoshafat Harkabi (Hebrew: יהושפט הרכבי; 21 September 1921 – 26 August 1994) was chief of Israeli military intelligence from 1955 until 1959 and afterwards a professor of International Relations and Middle East Studies at the Hebrew University of Jerusalem.

== Biography ==
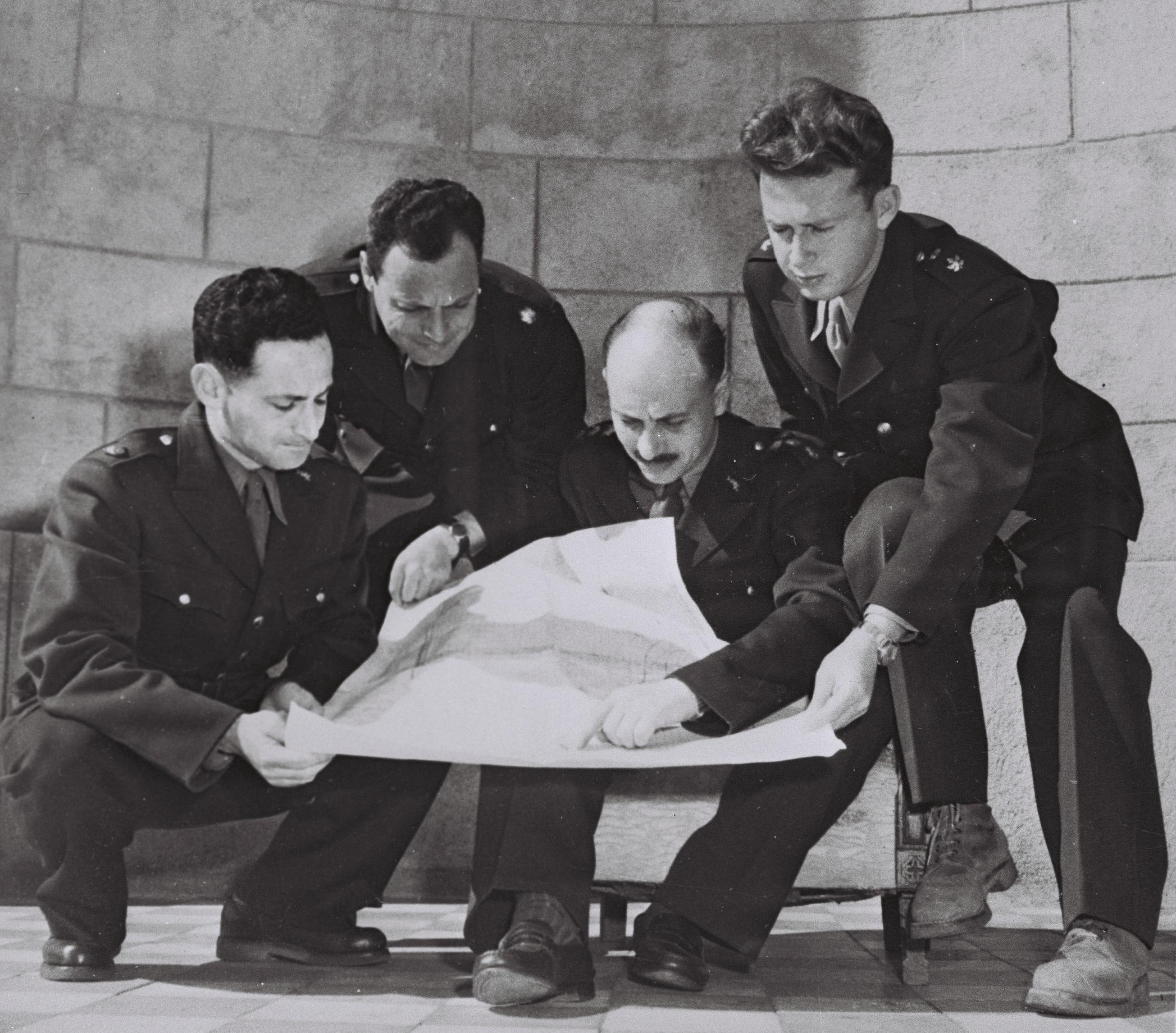
The Israeli delegation to the 1949 Armistice Agreements talks. Left to right: Commanders Yehoshafat Harkabi, Aryeh Simon, Yigael Yadin, and Yitzhak Rabin (1949)

Harkabi was born in Haifa to a Jewish family. He studied at the Hebrew Reali School. After graduating high school, he began studying philosophy and Middle Eastern Studies at the Hebrew University of Jerusalem. He studied the Arabic language and Arab culture out of a belief that the Yishuv must integrate with the wider region. He left his studies in 1939 to join the Haganah, joining the Haganah unit at kibbutz Hanita. In 1943, he enlisted in the British Army and fought in World War II, serving in the Palestine Regiment and then the Jewish Brigade. After the war, he resumed his studies at the Hebrew University and in 1947 participated in the Jewish Agency's first diplomats' course, which was taught by Walter Eytan. During the 1948 Arab-Israeli War, he served in the Israel Defense Forces as a company commander in the Etzioni Brigade. During the first truce of the war, he was appointed to serve as a liaison officer. He met King Abdullah I of Jordan four times during the war. His younger brother Meir was killed in action while fighting in the war. After the war, Harkabi served on the Israeli delegation to the negotiations over the 1949 Armistice Agreements in Rhodes.

Harkabi had a good command of Arabic, a deep knowledge of Arab civilization and history, and a solid understanding of Islam. He developed from an uncompromising hardliner to supporter of a Palestinian state who recognized the PLO as a negotiations partner. In his most well-known work Israel's Fateful Hour, Harkabi described himself as a "Machiavellian dove" intent on searching "for a policy by which Israel can get the best possible settlement of the conflict in the Middle East" (1988, p. xx) - a policy that would include a Zionism "of quality and not of acreage" (p. 225).

Harkabi was forced to resign as chief of Military Intelligence as a consequence of the 1959 Night of the Ducks.

Following his military career, Harkabi served as a visiting professor at Princeton University and guest scholar at the Brookings Institution. He was the Maurice Hexter professor and director of the Leonard Davis Institute of International Relations and Middle East Studies at Hebrew University of Jerusalem. He would earn an MPA from Harvard University in 1962.

== Awards ==
In 1993, Harkabi was awarded the Israel Prize, for political science.

== Published works ==
- Harkabi, Y. (1974). Arab Attitudes to Israel. Transaction Publishers. ISBN 0-85303-157-6
- Harkabi, Y. (1975). Palestinians and Israel. Transaction Publishers. ISBN 0-87855-172-7
- Harkabi, Y. (1977). Arab Strategies and Israel's Response. Free Press. ISBN 0-02-913760-8
- Harkabi, Y. (1978). Three Concepts of Arab Strategy. Anti-Defamation League of B'nai B'rith. ISBN B0006WY3PU
- Harkabi, Y. (1979). Palestinian Covenant and Its Meaning. Frank Cass Publishers. ISBN 0-85303-206-8
- Harkabi, Y. (1981). The Palestinian National Covenant (1968): An Israeli Commentary. ISBN B0007J3GFA
- Harkabi, Y. (1982). The Bar Kokhba Syndrome: Risk and Realism in International Relations. New York, NY, Rossel Books. ISBN 0-940646-01-3
- Harkabi, Y. (1985). Al Fatah's Doctrine. In The Israel-Arab Reader: A Documentary History of the Middle East Conflict. T. W. Laqueur and B. Rubin (Eds.). New York, NY, Penguin Books. ISBN 0-87196-873-8
- Harkabi, Y. (1988). Israel's Fateful Decisions. I.B. Tauris. ISBN 1-85043-094-2
- Harkabi, Y. (1989). Israel's Fateful Hour. HarperCollins. ISBN 0-06-091613-3 (Chapter 5: Nationalistic Judaism)
- Harkabi, Y. (1992). The Arab-Israeli Conflict on the Threshold of Negotiations. Center of International Studies, Princeton University. ISBN 99924-0-953-3

== See also ==
- List of Israel Prize recipients
