= Arthur Biram =

German–Israeli philosopher, philologist, and educator (1878–1967)

Arthur Yitzhak Biram
- ארתור בירם
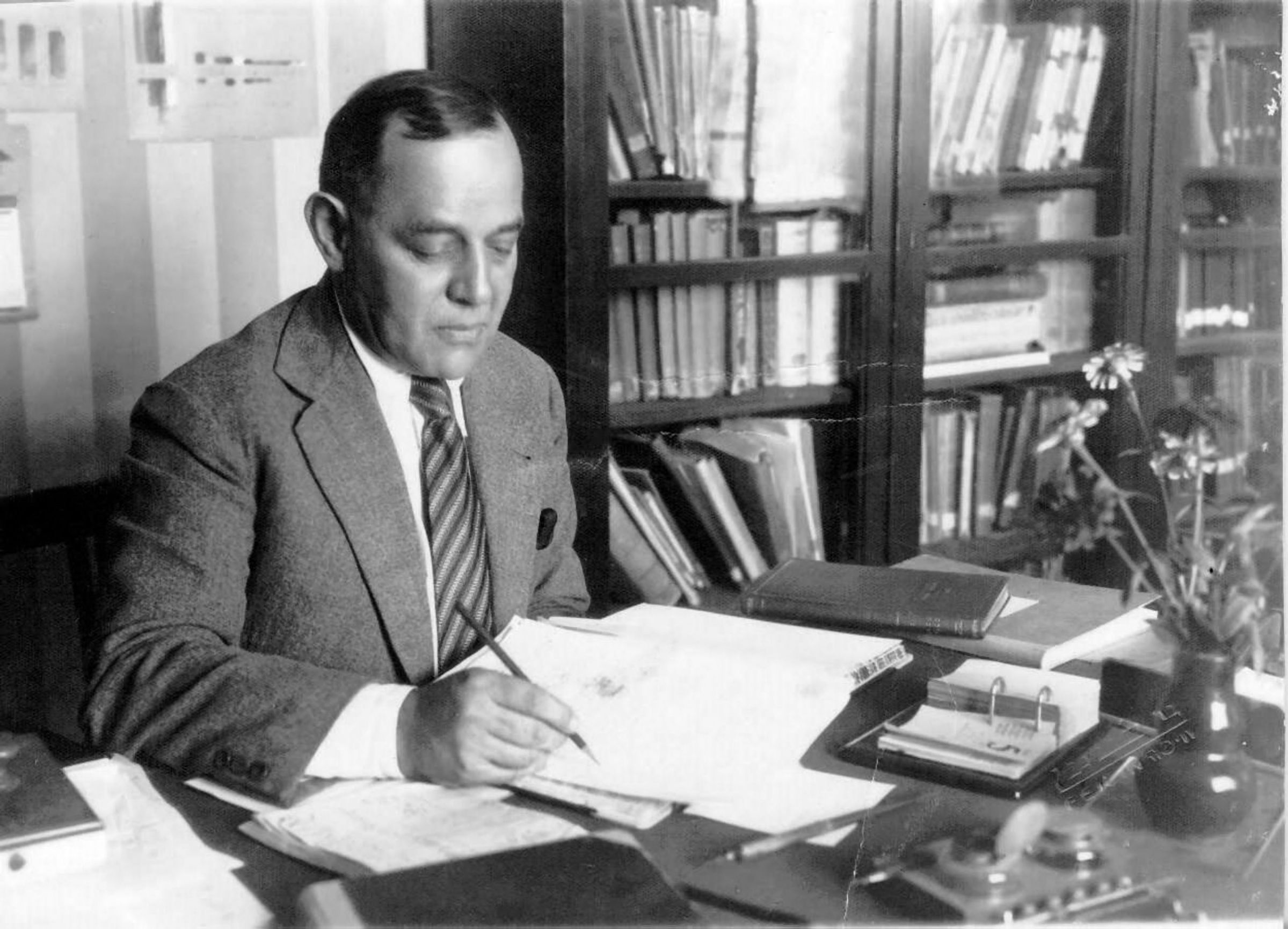
- Arthur Biram, 1928
- Born: August 13, 1878; Bischofswerda, Saxony, German Empire
- Died: June 5, 1967 (aged 88); Haifa, Israel
- Spouse: Hannah Tomeshevsky
- Children: 2 sons
- Awards: Israel Prize for education (1954)

Academic background
- Education: University of Berlin, University of Leipzig

Academic work
- Notable works: Founder of the Reali School in Haifa

Arthur Yitzhak Biram (Hebrew: ארתור בירם; August 13, 1878 – June 5, 1967) was a German-born Israeli philosopher, philologist, and educator. He was the founder of the Reali School in Haifa.

== Biography ==
Arthur Biram was born in Bischofswerda in Saxony and attended school in Hirschberg, Silesia. He studied languages, including Arabic, at University of Berlin and at University of Leipzig and earned a doctorate (Dr. phil.) at the University of Leipzig in 1902, on the philosophy of Abu-Rasid al-Nisaburi. In 1904 he graduated from the rabbinical program at Hochschule für die Wissenschaft des Judentums, and began to teach language and literature at the Berlinisches Gymnasium zum Grauen Kloster.

Biram was one of the founders of the Bar-Kochba club and a member of the German liberal religious stream 'Ezra', which recognized the importance of high school education. In 1913, he settled in Ottoman Palestine.

Biram married Hannah Tomeshevsky, with whom he had two sons. His son Aharon died in an accident while on reserve duty, and Binyamin, an engineer at the Dead Sea Works, was killed by a land mine.

== Pedagogic career ==
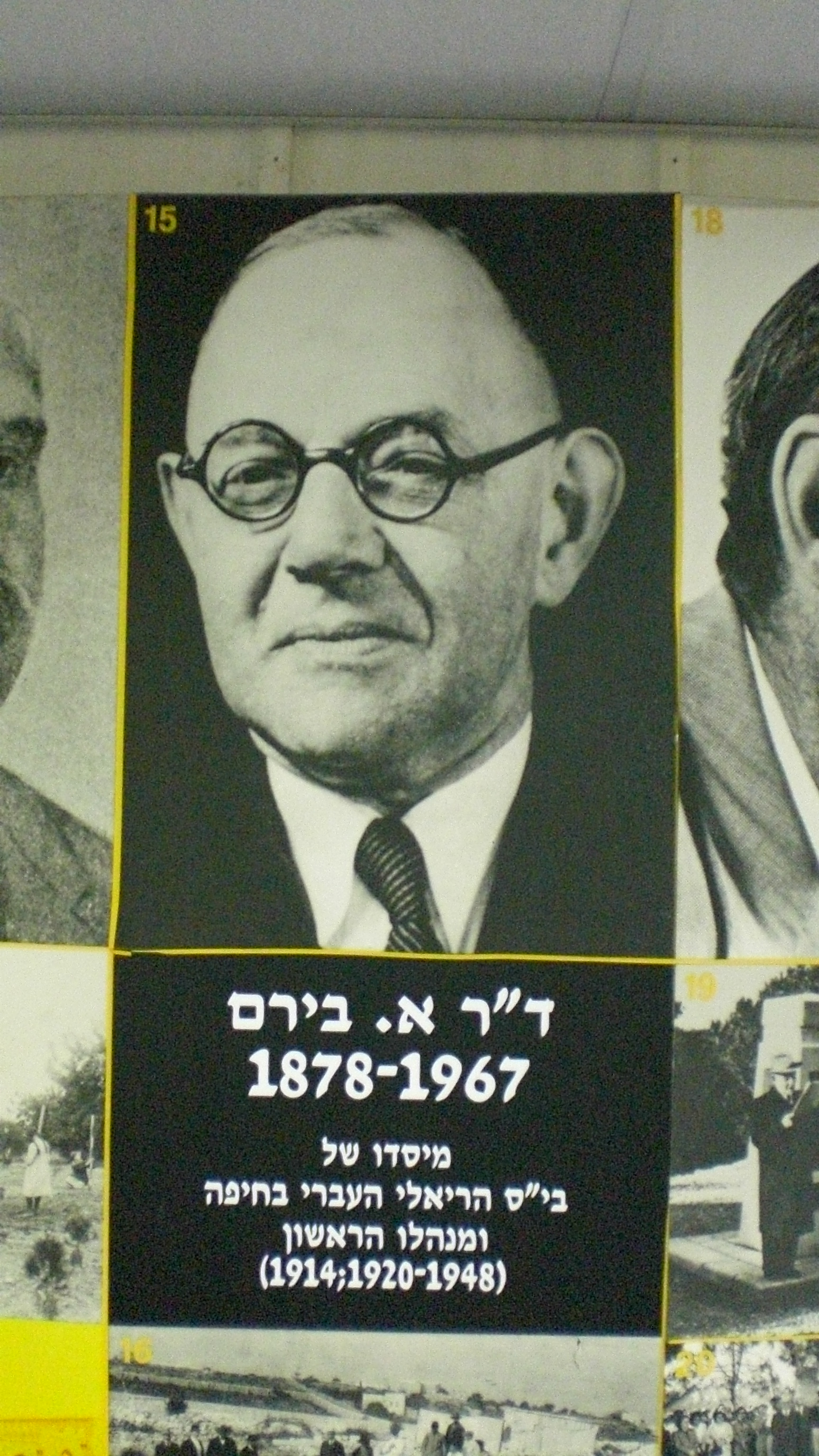
Arthur Biram

Biram founded the Hebrew Reali School in Haifa in 1913 and was appointed its first principal. When World War I broke out, Biram was drafted by the German army and stationed in Afula. In 1919, he returned to school.

As part of Biram's philosophy of education, in 1937 he implemented compulsory Hagam training for girls in the Hebrew Reali School in Haifa, laying the foundation for recruitment of women in the Haganah, and later the Israel Defense Forces.

In 1948, he resigned his post as principal, and on his 75th birthday, he authored a collection of essays on the Bible. Altogether, he wrote about 50 publications in Hebrew, German, English, and Arabic. Biram died in Haifa in 1967.

== Awards and recognition ==
In 1954, he was awarded the Israel Prize for education.

== See also ==
- List of Israel Prize recipients
