= Shulamith Shahar =

Israeli historian (1928–2025)

- שולמית שחר
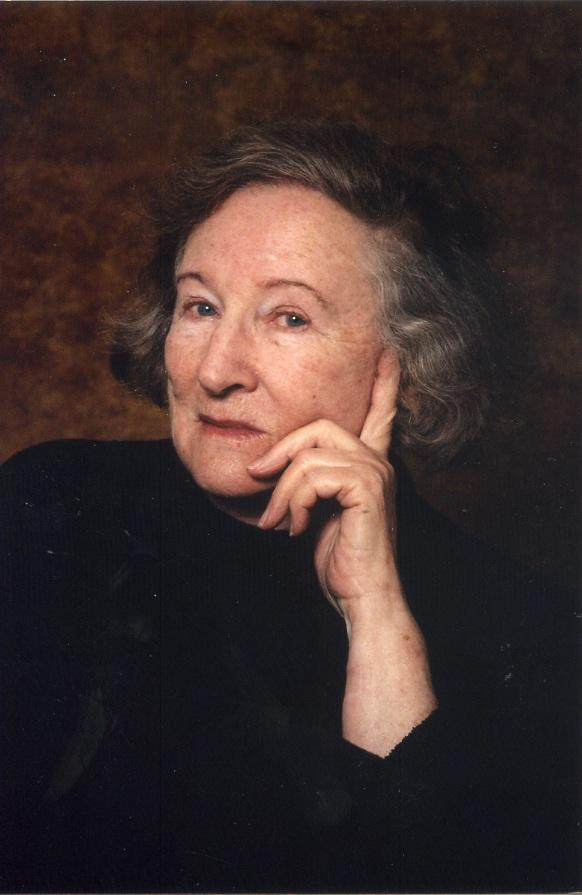
- Shulamith Shahar
- Born: 2 November 1928; Riga, Latvia
- Died: 9 January 2025 (aged 96); Israel
- Occupations: Historian, academic
- Known for: Fourth Estate: A History of Women in the Middle Ages
- Awards: Israel Prize (2003)

Shulamith Shahar (Hebrew: שולמית שחר; 2 November 1928 – 9 January 2025) was an Israeli historian. Shahar's 1981 study Fourth Estate: A History of Women in the Middle Ages was the first to specifically examine the role of women in the medieval period. The book is used as a text for gender studies and medieval history classes. This, and her subsequent books, have been published in both Hebrew and English. She wrote historical articles in these languages as well as French and translated three books from Latin to Hebrew.

== Life and career ==
Shulamith Shahar was born in Latvia on 2 November 1928, the youngest of three daughters of industrialist Moshe Weinstock and his wife Deborah. In 1933, the family emigrated to Mandate Palestine, moving to Haifa. At the time, Shahar spoke only Russian. Her middle sister, Dina, died in the early 1940s during a German massacre of Jews outside Riga. In high school, Shahar served in the Haganah, a defence force, where she was in charge of an arms depot. After graduating, she attended Hebrew University of Jerusalem, where she soon earned her bachelor's degree in history. At age 19, Shahar married Yitzhak Cohen. They had one child, Evyatar, and divorced when he was two. Shahar then returned to Jerusalem to pursue a master's degree. To support herself, Shahar taught at a high school.

In 1954, Shahar met writer David Shahar at a Purim Party. They lived together for two years before marrying. The couple had two children, a boy and a girl. The day after the birth of their daughter, Shulamith's son Evyatar was killed in an army training accident.

After her second marriage, Shulamith Shahar continued her education, and received a scholarship to the Sorbonne. She wrote her doctoral dissertation while living in Paris. On her return to Israel, Shahar became a professor at Tel Aviv University, eventually becoming department head. She retired at age 64 to pursue the career she had always wanted: social work. Shahar was chairperson of a non-profit association which manages a home for battered wives in Jerusalem.

David Shahar died in 1997. For the last few years of his life, he divided his time between Israel and Paris; Shulamith Shahar remained in Israel, in the home they shared for decades. She died on 9 January 2025, at the age of 96.

== Academic career ==
In 1981, Shahar published a groundbreaking study, Fourth Estate: A History of Women in the Middle Ages. The study was published in book form in 1983, and subsequently translated into English. "The first historical work that dealt with history and way of life of women in an era that was always told from a male perspective", Fourth Estate is often used in gender studies and medieval history courses. Her work has made Shahar a feminist role model, although she claimed to be uninterested in the theory of feminism. In an interview, Shahar explained: "I always preferred to study things that interest me personally. To produce good writing one needs genuine emotion, and there can be no such emotion if the writer does not identify deeply with the subject of the writing."

Shahar's second book, Childhood and the Middle Ages, was published in 1990 and released in both English and Hebrew. It was translated into German in 1991. According to Shahar, her research disproved the previously popular notion that medieval infant mortality rates caused parents of the time to love their children less than modern parents do. Her third book, Growing Old in the Middle Ages: Winter Clothes Us in Shadow and Pain (1995) was also published in Hebrew and English. Both have proved very popular in Israel. She also published dozens of articles in Hebrew, French, and English.

In addition to her original works, Shahar translated The Letters of Abelard and Heloise into Hebrew from Latin. She also translated into Hebrew two twelfth-century autobiographies, one by a Catholic monk and one by a Jew who converted to Christianity.

== Awards ==
In 2003, Shahar was awarded the Israel Prize, for general history.

== See also ==
- List of Israel Prize recipients
