= Hebrew Reali School =

Coordinates: 32°47′25.07″N 34°59′28.27″E

Hebrew Reali School of Haifa
- בית הספר הריאלי העברי בחיפה
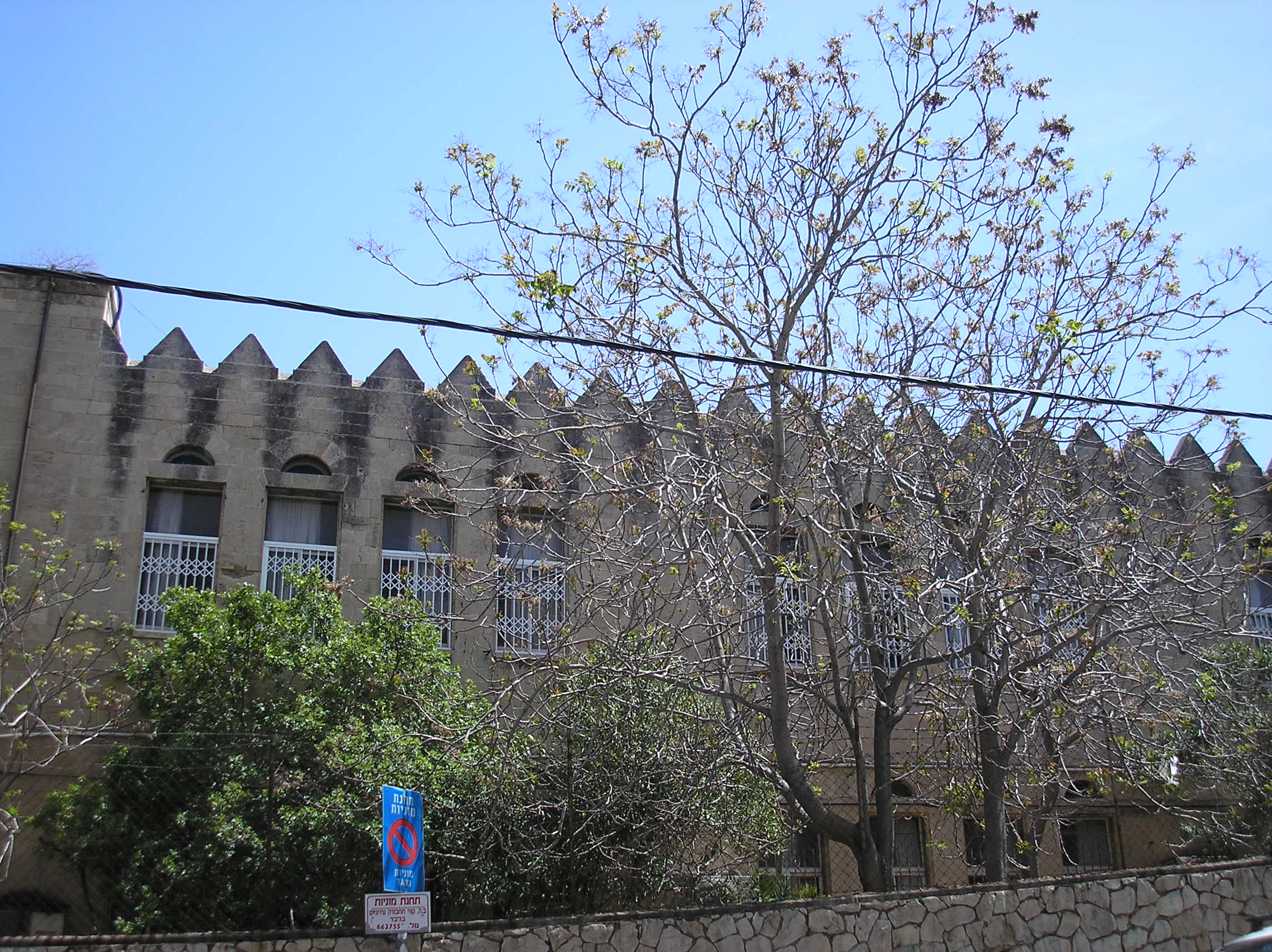

Location
- Hertzel 16; Haifa 3312103; Israel

Information
- Type: Private
- Motto: Hebrew: הצנע לכת (Walk Humbly)
- Established: November 1913
- Founder: Arthur Biram
- Principal: Yosi Ben-Dov
- Staff: 650
- Grades: pre-pre-K - 12
- Gender: Coeducational
- Enrollment: 4,500
- Tuition: Varies
- Website: Official Website

The Hebrew Reali School of Haifa (Hebrew: בֵּית־הַסֵּפֶר הָרֵיאָלִי הָעִבְרִי בְחֵיפָה, romanized: Bet ha-sefer ha-Reali ha‘Ivri be-Ḥeifa), located in Haifa, Israel, is one of the country's oldest private schools.

== History ==
The Reali school was established by Arthur Biram on behalf of EZRA, a German Jewish organization, and in close connection with the Technion in 1913, before the outbreak of World War I. The historical building near the old Technion was designed by German-Jewish architect Alexander Baerwald.

The fundamental values of the school are Zionism, humanism, tolerance and democracy. At the time, the Yishuv, or pre-state Jewish community in Acre Sanjak, was engaged in a debate over the language of instruction in the country's Jewish schools. When it was decided that the sciences would be taught in German, Biram responded by founding the Hebrew Reali School. The first branch of the school was opened in the Hadar neighborhood of Haifa. In 1923, the school moved into a building on the old campus of the Technion which had formerly been used as a British military hospital. During that period the school founded a Scouts troop, the 'Carmel Wanderers' (Hebrew: מְשׁוֹטְטֵי כַרְמֶל; Meshotetei Carmel), and in 1924 the school opened a humanities major, in addition to the previously offered science major. At the very same year the schools motto was determined: "And Walk Humbly" (Hebrew: וְהַצְנֵ֥עַ לֶ֖כֶת; vehatzna‘ lechet) (Micha, 6:8). This motto expresses the school's aspirations in the realm of education.

Between the years 1940-1948, given World War II and the strive towards establishing the country, the students took classes in shifts and the graduates joined the 'service year' (Hebrew: שְׁנַת שֵׁרוּת; shnat sherut).

In January 2014 Ron Kitrey retired and Dr. Yosi Ben-Dov replaced him as the school's headmaster.

== Branches ==
Today the school has seven branches: 8 kindergartens; 3 elementary schools named after their neighbourhoods: Yesod Hadar; Yesod Ahuza and Yesod Merkaz; 3 middle schools: Tichon Hadar; Tichon Ahuza; Tichon Merkaz; and one high school: Beit Biram. In 1953, a military boarding school was established in proximity to Beit Biram.

In September 2008, the school opened its latest branch, the "Reali-gan" (kindergarten). The kindergarten advocates ecological education: Recycling, energy saving and nature protection.

In 2017 the military boarding school (Hebrew: הַפְּנִימִיָּה הַצְּבָאִית לְפִקּוּד; HaPnimiya haTzva’it leFikud) became an integrated part of the school.

== Notable alumni ==
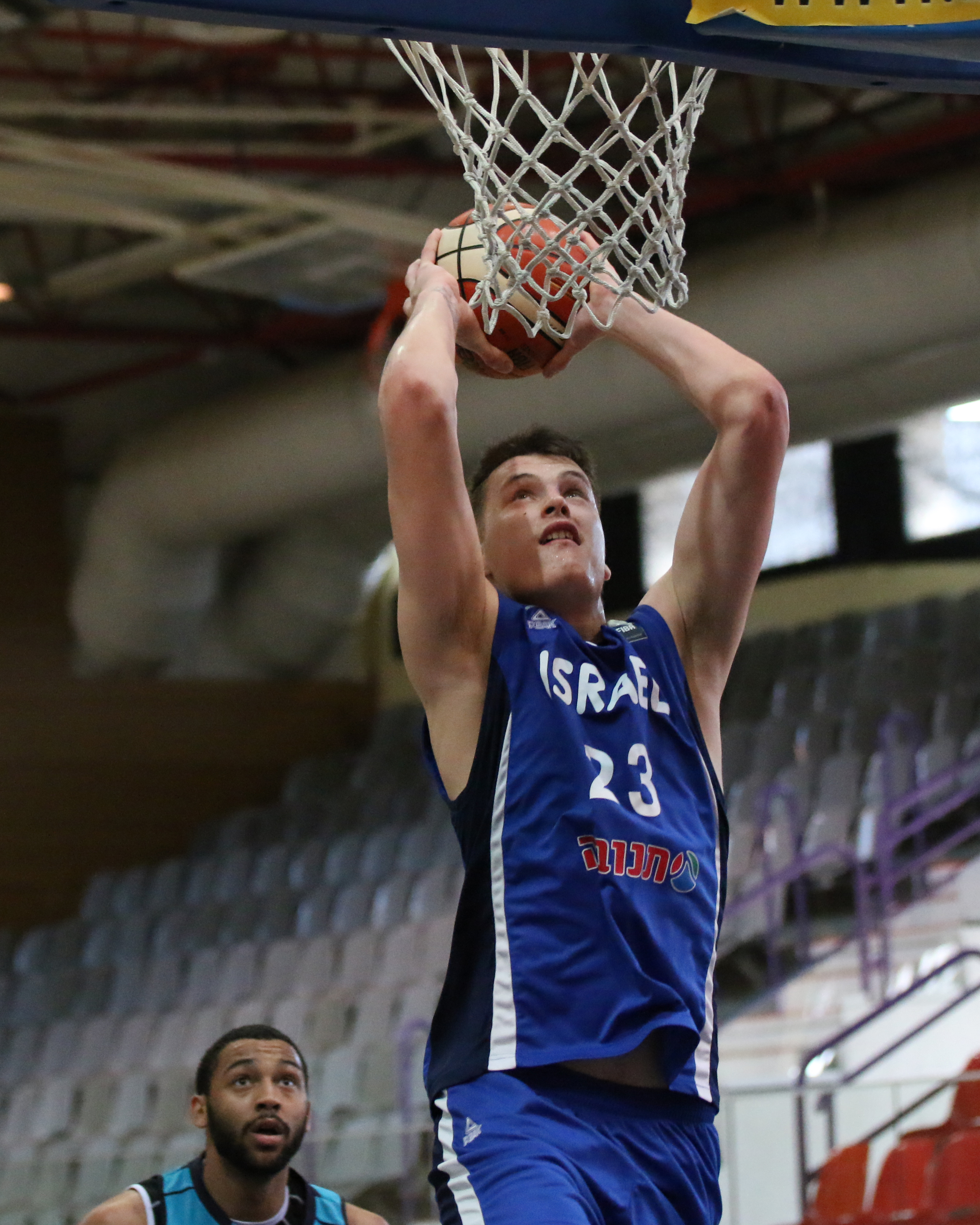
Daniel Koperberg

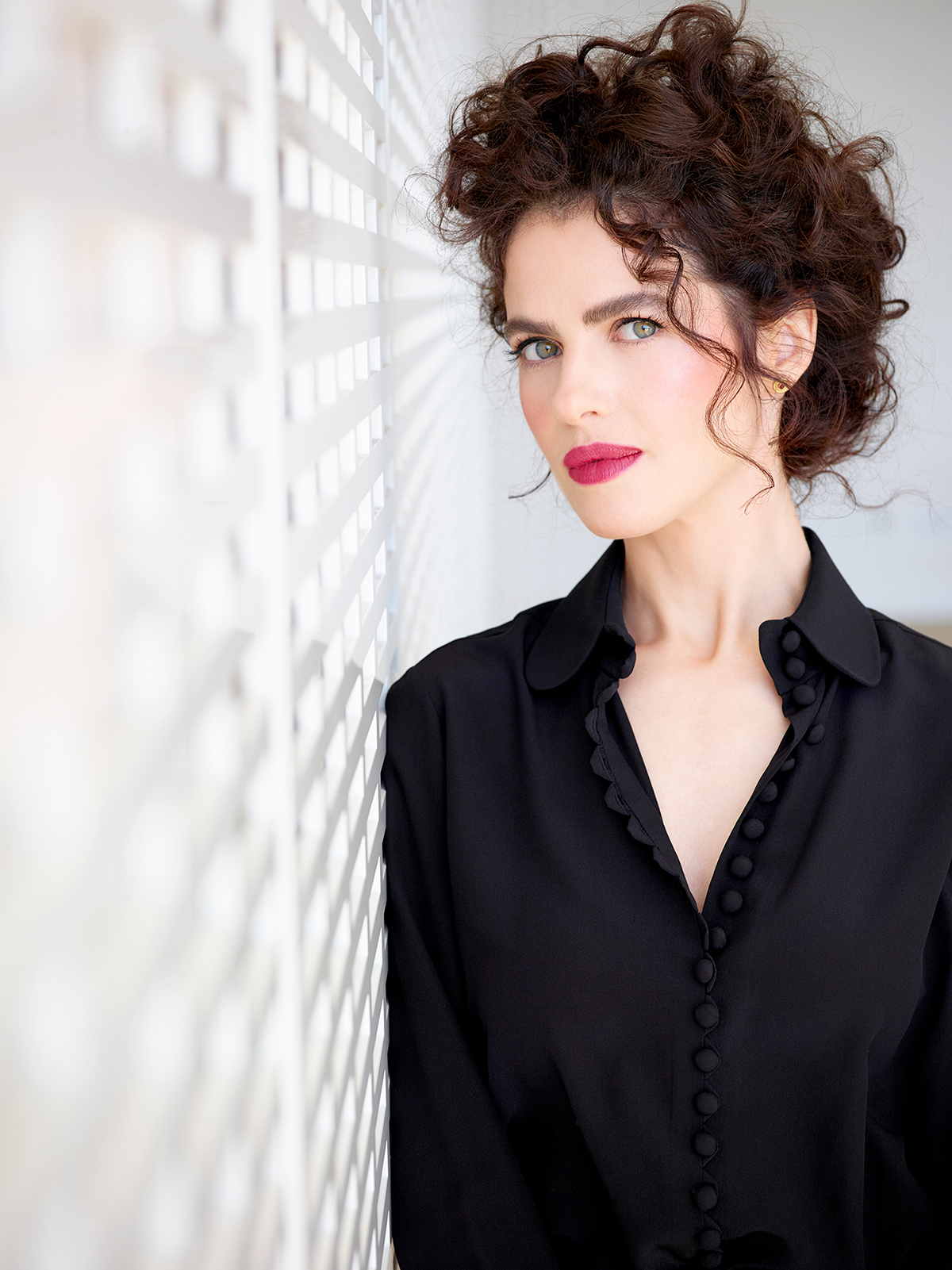
Neri Oxman

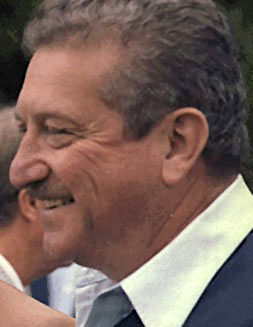
Ezer Weizman

- Amir Aczel (1950–2015), mathematician, professor and author of popular books on science and mathematics
- Rachel Adato (born 1947), gynaecologist, lawyer, and politician who served as a member of the Knesset
- Miriam Adelson (born 1945), medical research scientist and philanthropist
- Azaria Alon
- Noga Alon
- Ruth Amiran
- Galila Ron-Feder Amit (born 1949), children's author
- Yosi Ben-Dov
- Miriam Ben-Peretz
- Yoav Benjamini
- Shlomo Bentin
- Avraham Biran
- Lior Suchard, Israeli mentalist
- Miron Bleiberg, Israeli-Australian football manager
- Shimshon Brokman (born 1957), Olympic sailor
- Michael Bruno, economist
- Gil Cohen, Olympic sailor
- Yitzhak Danziger (1916–77), sculptor
- Yaakov Dori (1899-1973), first Chief of Staff of the Israel Defense Forces, President of the Technion – Israel Institute of Technology
- Yehezkel Dror
- Amir Drori
- Aryeh Dvoretzky
- Esther Ita Feldman (1909-1999)
- Fahoum Fahoum
- Amir Gal-Or
- Ruth Gavison
- Amos Gitai
- Mooky Greidinger
- Dahlia Greidinger
- Emil Grunzweig
- Yehoshafat Harkabi
- Daniel Koperberg (born 1997), basketball player
- Haim Laskov (1919–83), Chief of Staff of the Israel Defense Forces
- Hava Lazarus-Yafeh (1930–998), Orientalist, educator
- Zafra Lerman (Jacobi), chemist, educator, and humanitarian
- Amnon Lipkin-Shahak (1944-2012), Chief of Staff of the Israel Defense Forces and politician
- Uriel Lubrani (1926–2018), diplomat, military official, and national security advisor
- Ehud Manor (1941–2005), songwriter, translator, and radio and TV personality
- Amihai Mazar
- Amram Mitzna
- Bezalel Narkiss
- Neri Oxman (born 1976), American-Israeli designer and professor known for art that combines design, biology, computing, and materials engineering
- Ilan Pappé
- Michael O. Rabin (1931–2026) , one of the founders of computer science in Israel and a Turing Award laureate
- Asya Rolls
- Herbert Salzman (1916–1990), American businessman and US Ambassador to the Organisation for Economic Co-operation and Development
- Roy Schwartz Tichon, social entrepreneur
- Aviem Sella
- Shulamith Shahar
- Abraham Silberschatz, computer scientist
- Eli Upfal
- Matan Vilnai
- Zev Vilnay
- Yochanan Vollach (born 1945), footballer
- Ezer Weizman (1924–2005), 7th President of Israel, Commander of the Israeli Air Force, and Minister of Defense
- Avi Wigderson
- David Witzthum
- Aharon Yadlin (1926–2022), educator and politician
