= Daniel Landau =

Israeli entrepreneur, artist, and researcher (born 1973)

Daniel Landau דניאל לנדאו
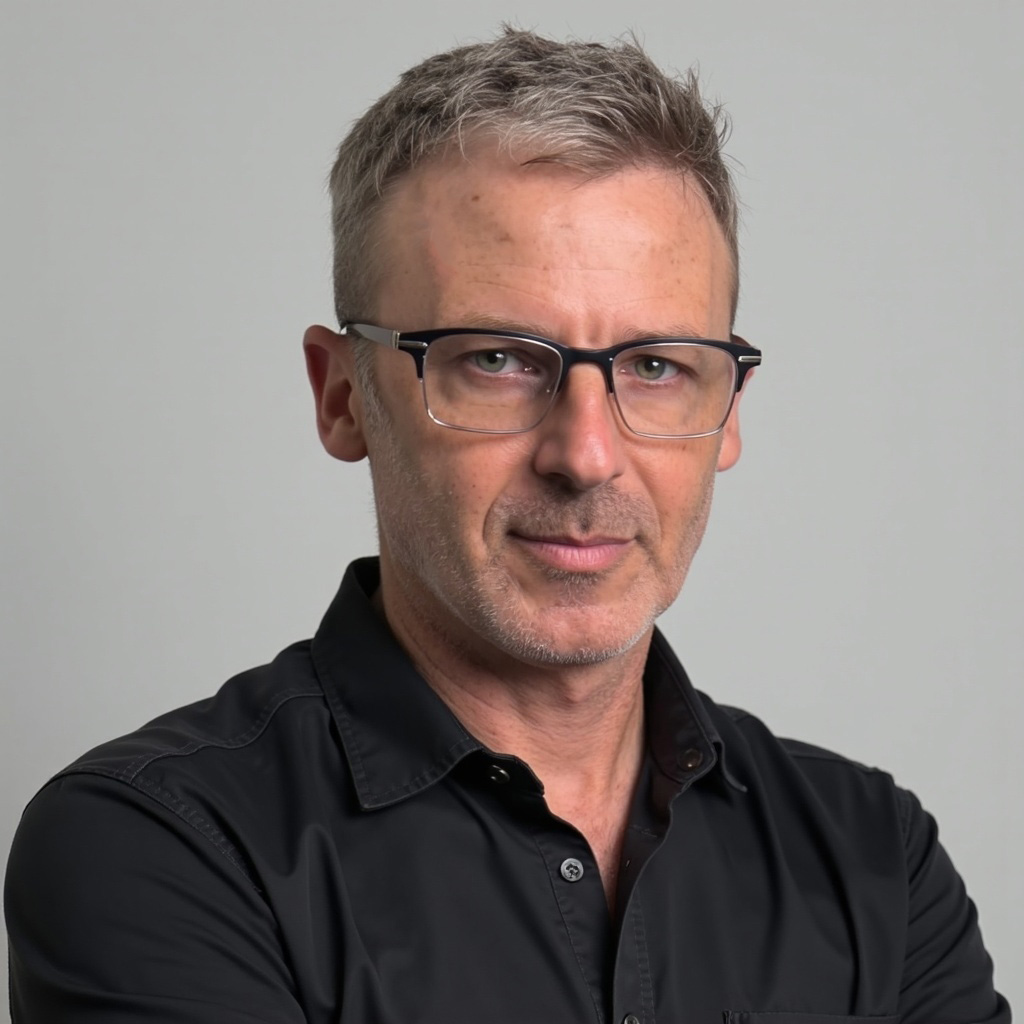
- Landau in 2025
- Born: 1 March 1973 (age 53); Jerusalem, Israel
- Known for: Media art; video art
- Movement: Israeli art
- Website: daniel-landau.com

Cave study – Tel Aviv Museum, 2015

Daniel Landau (Hebrew: דניאל לנדאו; born 1 March 1973) is an Israeli artist, researcher, and entrepreneur specializing in media, virtual reality, and AI. He is the founder and CEO of AVRIS, a learning technology company. He has presented his work at museums, festivals, and conferences worldwide.

== Biography ==
Landau grew up in Jerusalem, Israel. In 1996, he relocated to the Netherlands to pursue his bachelor's and master's degrees at the Royal Conservatory of the Hague, where he specialized in Electronic music sonology. During his studies, he developed interactive systems that process sound and image in real time and created new digital tools for virtual artistic works.

=== Art career ===
Since 1996, Landau has worked as a media artist, exploring the use and development of technology in performance and interactive installations. His works often feature encounters between technology and the human body, video installations, and projection-based performances.

While studying at the royal conservatory, Landau composed music for Dutch contemporary ensembles, including Nieuw Ensemble, Orkest de Volharding, and Slagwerkgroep Den Haag. His compositions have been performed at various European music festivals, including the Gaudeamus International Music Festival in the Netherlands and the Spring Festival at the Paris Opera House, in France.

In 2001, Landau and Isak Goldschneider founded the BZAZ Foundation, an art collective dedicated to media performances. Their works have been exhibited in Germany, Hungary, England, Belgium, Mexico, Spain, and Israel.

In 2008, Landau created the performance "One Dimensional Man", a British-Israeli production inspired by Herbert Marcuse's book of the same name. Using technology developed for the show, the actor-dancers appeared as living projections onstage, with video images mapped onto their faces. The show premiered at the Suzanne Dellal Center in Tel Aviv.

Following "One Dimensional Man", Landau was invited by the Digital Art Center in Holon to create a new work for the "Weizmann Demonstration" event, an evening of art performances held in Weizmann Square in 2010. His work "Reside 1.1: They're Not Nice" was based on documentary video footage and inspired by a meeting with activist Reuven Abergel, one of the founders of the Israeli Black Panther movement. This piece was the first in the "Reside" series (2010–2012), which explored the relationship between immigrant communities and the societies they joined, combining performance, video, and documentary materials.

=== Academic career ===
Landau is a lecturer and a media researcher. Between 2013 and 2015, he served as head of the Media Studies Department at the Faculty of Arts – Midrasha, Beit Berl College. Since 2015, he has been a senior research fellow at the Advanced Reality Laboratory of Reichman University in Herzliya. In 2016, he began his doctoral studies at the Media Lab of Aalto University in Helsinki, Finland. In 2017, he taught in the Department of Media and Design at UCLA, US.

Landau has participated as a guest lecturer at numerous international conferences, festivals, and universities, including Stanford University, the California Institute of Technology, and the University of San Diego, in the US; Shenzhen Fair, China; RIXC Festival, Latvia; B3 Festival Biennale of the Moving Image in Frankfurt, Germany; Haifa International Film Festival, Israel; and the National Library of Technology in Prague, Czechia.

=== Technological entrepreneurship ===
In addition, Landau has been involved in technological entrepreneurship. In 2014, he co-founded "oh-man, oh-machine" with Carmel Weissman, a digital platform for hosting international conferences, workshops, and research groups.

In 2021, he founded AVRIS and currently serves as its CEO. The company develops digital learning platforms incorporating virtual reality and AI technologies.

=== Personal life ===
Landau is married to Michal Oppenheim Landau, a musician and vocal instructor. The couple has three children, and they live in Tel Aviv. His older sister, Sigalit Landau, is also an artist.

== Selected exhibitions and presentations ==
- 2001 – Scratch / 8-minute video / Mexico, the Netherlands
- 2003 – Grid City / 45-minute show / Premiere at the Bath International Music Festival / England
- 2003 – Planeta Kennel / 10-minute video / Sitges Film Festival, Spain
- 2004 – Channel Shabab / 70-minute show / The Netherlands, Hungary, Germany
- 2007 – Ana Shahid | Ensemble, Objects & Computer | Opéra Bastille, Paris
- 2009 – One-Dimensional Man / 62-minute show / Suzanne Dellal Center for Dance and Theater
- 2010 – From Canyons to Stars / video triptych and orchestra / 110 minutes / Hamburg
- 2010 – Not Very Nice People / 22-minute installation / The Israeli Digital Art Center, Holon
- 2011 – Reside 1.1: Jessie Cohen / 65-minute show / premiere at Kaserne Basel, Switzerland
- 2011 – Reside 1.2: King Faisal 57 / 20-minute installation / Loving Art, Tel Aviv, Yehuda HaYamit
- 2012 – The Nature of Things / 4-minute video / the Israel Museum, Jerusalem, Ron Arad installation
- 2012 – Not Very Nice People / 8-minute video / Maison européenne de la photographie, Paris
- 2012 – Reside 1.4: Mount Zion–Darfur / 30-minute installation / Loving Art, Tel Aviv
- 2013 – Make a Wish / site-specific light installation, Habima Square, Tel Aviv
- 2014 – Open Skies / 5-minute video / Circle One, Berlin
- 2014 – Eye Drum / 6-minute video / The Israel Museum, Jerusalem
- 2014 – HeLa / Curator of a group exhibition at Hayarkon 19 – Oh Man Oh Machine project
- 2015 – Cave Study / video installation 360, Tel Aviv Museum: Isu Tori Game / video installation, Nakanojo Biennale, Japan
- 2015 – I Will Be Right Back / 55-minute video installation for a dance show, in collaboration with Iris Erez
- 2016 – The Perfect Post-Human / Video installation, London Roundhouse
- 2016 – Time Body Experiment / Performative experiment, PrintScreen Festival
- 2016 – Time Motion Study / Video installation 360, in collaboration with Arkadi Zaides, The James Gallery, New York
- 2017 – Self-Study_01 | VR performance | B3 Film Festival, Frankfurt
- 2018 – Visitors | media installation | Israel Museum, Jerusalem
- 2019 – Self-Study_02 | Open Lab performance | CCA, Tel Aviv
- 2020 – Wind Over Water: Reflective Light Installation. Artefact, Tel Aviv Municipality
- 2021 – I Am Sitting in a Room / performance / Acco Festival
