= Kochavi Shemesh =

Mizrahi activist (1944–2019)

- כוכבי שמש
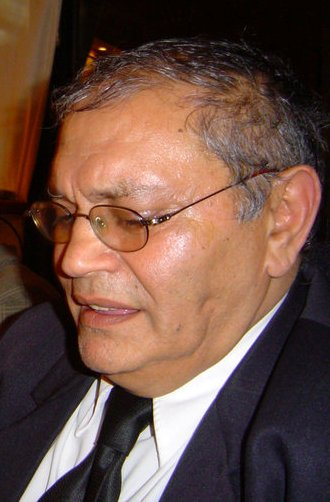
- Born: 10 January 1944; Baghdad, Kingdom of Iraq
- Died: 13 May 2019 (aged 75)
- Citizenship: Israel
- Education: University of Manchester
- Occupations: Activist, lawyer

Kochavi Shemesh (sometimes spelled "Kohavi", Hebrew: כוכבי שמש; 10 January 1944 – 13 May 2019) was a lawyer, leftist activist, and one of the leaders of the Israeli Black Panthers and the editor of its main publication Ha'panter Ha'shachor (Hebrew: הפנתר השחור, lit. 'The Black Panther'). He also helped form the Israeli political party Hadash, which formed as a merger between the Black Panthers, the Israeli Communist Party, and other leftist organizations.

== Biography ==
=== Early life ===
Shemesh was born in Baghdad, Iraq in the Rabbi Meir Bal HaNess Jewish Hospital in January 1944. His family moved to Israel in July 1950, and he grew up in Musrara, Jerusalem, a neighborhood predominantly populated by recent Mizrahi and Sephardi immigrants. He did not receive any formal secular education as a child, dropping out before he even completed first grade. However, he did study in ultra orthodox schools until the age of 14. For most of his life, he worked as a taxi driver and restaurant worker.

In the 1960s, Shemesh founded and edited a daily community newspaper, which he operated illegally without a permit, publishing sports and Sephardi human interest stories. After its seventh issue was published, he was arrested and sentenced to either pay a fine or serve a three-week prison sentence, and chose on the basis of principle to serve the sentence in prison.

=== Activity with the Black Panthers ===
In 1971, friends of Shemesh introduced him to the members of the then-recently founded Israeli Black Panthers, who were themselves inspired by the American Black Panther Party. Shemesh joined the organization immediately, and would soon become its primary ideologue and the editor of its publications from 1971 until 1977, when those duties were taken over by Charlie Biton and Saadia Marciano. Shemesh, Biton, and Marciano together comprised the leadership of the Black Panthers.

Shemesh participated in all of the Black Panthers' operations and demonstrations. In August 1971, after the police violently broke up a Black Panther demonstration in Zion Square, he was arrested alongside several of his comrades on suspicion of having violated the terms of demonstration permits that they had received. In January 1972, he participated in a demonstration against the World Zionist Congress, arguing that the Congress was partial to exclusively to the interests of Zionist Jews of European origins and that the organization "does not speak for all the Jews of the world" as it claimed. Later that year, he participated in one of the Black Panthers' most famous actions nicknamed "Operation Milk", where they stole milk bottles from the relatively wealthy neighborhood of Rehavia and distributed them to the poor living in the slums of Jerusalem, writing on the bottles "For the children of the slums who do not have the milk that they need in the morning, while elsewhere cats and dogs live in abundance". In the summer of 1973, Shemesh participated in a delegation to 10th World Festival of Youth and Students organized by the Israeli Communist Party, meeting Angela Davis as well as the leaders of the Palestine Liberation Organization and several Eastern Bloc countries.

In the run up to the 1973 Israeli legislative election, Shemesh opposed a list sponsored by the Black Panthers and headed by Shalom Cohen, instead running unsuccessfully on his own platform with Adi Malcah. In the following elections in 1977, Shemesh and Charlie Biton engaged in talks with the Israeli Communist Party, at the time known by the acronym "Rakah" (Hebrew: רק״ח), merging the Black Panthers and Rakah into Hadash (The Democratic Front for Peace and Equality).

=== Later life ===
In the 1990s, following the dissolution of the Soviet Union, Shemesh advocated against accepting the mass immigration of Soviet Jews until Israel addressed the impoverished and dispossessed within its own borders. Shemesh participated in charitable aid organizations, co-founding Zoharim village, the first drug addiction recovery center in Israel. As a result of his experiences working on that project, Shemesh alongside other Black Panthers began a campaign to demand general amnesty for prison inmates.

Despite not having completed elementary school, Shemesh attended law school and became an attorney in 2003. Soon afterward, he joined the Association for Civil Rights in Israel.

In 2007, Shemesh and Biton started a new social movement to further the interests of Mizrahi Jews, immigrants from the Soviet Union and Ethiopian immigrants.

Shemesh died on May 13, 2019, survived by his wife, Rachel Ashur Shemesh, and three children.

== Views and legacy ==
Throughout his life, Shemesh promoted the rights of Mizrahi Jews and Palestinians, as well as other marginalized groups around the world. He was quoted in 1973 as saying that "[Mizrahi's] strongest bond is with the poor and oppressed in the Middle East", and that the Black Panthers' goals were to "[seek] an alliance with the Arabs and forming an economic bloc to counter the influences of both US and the USSR." Shemesh was critical of the Israeli government, condemning its treatment of Palestinians and supporting cession of Israeli territory for the establishment of a separate Palestinian State. Shemesh met with leaders of the PLO and expressed solidarity with their cause, stating that "there will be no equality for Mizrahim for as long as there is occupation".

Although many of Shemesh's political views were unpopular in Israel, he inspired a generation of Mizrahi activists in the country.

== See also ==
- Anti-Zionism
- Matzpen
- Mizrahi Jews in Israel
- Reuven Abergel
