= Charlie Biton =

Israeli social activist and politician (1947–2024)

- צ'רלי ביטון
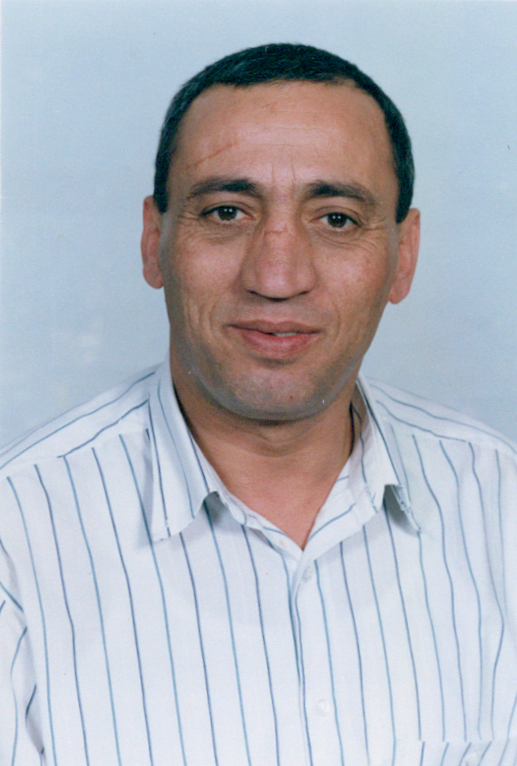

Faction represented in the Knesset
- 1977–1990: Hadash
- 1990–1992: Black Panthers

Personal details
- Born: 11 April 1947 Casablanca, Morocco
- Died: 24 February 2024 (aged 76)

Charlie-Shalom Biton (Hebrew: צ'רלי-שלום ביטון; 11 April 1947 – 24 February 2024) was a Moroccan-Israeli social activist and politician who served as a member of the Knesset for Hadash and the Black Panthers between 1977 and 1992.

== Biography ==
Charlie Biton was born in Casablanca, Morocco, one of six children. His family immigrated to Israel in 1949 when he was two years old. He grew up in the Musrara neighbourhood of Jerusalem and attended an ORT vocational school. In early 1971 he was one of the founders of the Israeli Black Panthers movement, along with Sa'adia Marciano, Reuven Abergel and Eli Avichzer. He was arrested after the organisation protested outside Jerusalem's City Hall in March that year. In 1974 he was sentenced to seven months in prison for assaulting a police officer. He went into hiding to avoid his sentence, and was later pardoned after lobbying from Ratz MK Shulamit Aloni and the Sephardi Chief Rabbi Ovadia Yosef.

The Black Panthers contested the 1973 Knesset elections with Biton seventh on the party's list, but missed out on a seat as they were 0.15% below the electoral threshold. However, after the Black Panthers became aligned with Hadash, Biton was elected to the Knesset on the Hadash list in 1977. Three years later he was the first serving MK to publicly meet Palestine Liberation Organisation leader Yasser Arafat. He was re-elected in 1981, 1984 and 1988. On 25 December 1990, he left Hadash to establish his own faction. The faction's name was not initially approved by the House Committee, but on 1 January 1991 it was named Black Panthers. In the 1992 Knesset elections he headed a list named Hatikva, but it won only 2,053 votes (0.1%), well below the 1.5% electoral threshold, and Biton lost his seat.

Biton's health deteriorated after a neck operation in 2021 led to a blood vessel bursting. He died on 24 February 2024, at the age of 76, and was buried in Givat Shaul cemetery.

== See also ==
- Kochavi Shemesh, another leader of the Blank Panthers
