= Saadia Marciano =

Israeli politician (1950–2007)

- סעדיה מרציאנו

Faction represented in the Knesset
- 1980: Left Camp of Israel
- 1980–1981: Unity Party

Personal details
- Born: 1 May 1950 Oujda, Morocco
- Died: 21 December 2007 (aged 57)

Saadia Marciano (Hebrew: סעדיה מרציאנו; 1 May 1950 – 21 December 2007) was a Moroccan-Israeli social activist and politician, and founder of the Israeli Black Panthers protest movement.

== Biography ==
Born in Oujda, Morocco in 1950, Marciano's family immigrated to Israel before his first birthday, where he grew up in the Musrara neighborhood of Jerusalem. He was inspired by the example of the Black Panthers to organise a national movement to liberate Mizrahi Jews, and founded the Israeli Black Panthers in 1971. The organisation's name was attributed to Marciano by Kochavi Shemesh, who claimed that it was chosen to frighten Israeli Prime Minister Golda Meir.

In 1972, Marciano was part of a Black Panthers group who moved milk bottles from middle-class neighbourhoods to poor ones. During a demonstration, he was given a black eye by a police officer, and this brought him to national attention. The group collapsed the following year, but Marciano continued to campaign for equality, and also set up a drug rehabilitation centre.

The Israeli Black Panthers joined the Left Camp of Israel party prior to the 1977 elections, and Marciano received a top five spot on their list. The party won two seats in the Knesset, and Marciano was one of five people to hold one, on a rotation basis. He entered the Knesset in May 1980, but in November he left the party and sat as an independent MK, before forming the Equality in Israel - Panthers party. After being joined by Mordechai Elgrably, the party changed its name to the Unity Party. However, the party failed to cross the 1% electoral threshold in the 1981 elections and Marciano was therefore not re-elected.

A relative of Marciano, Yoram Marciano, was also a member of the Knesset.

== See also ==
- Charlie Biton
- Kochavi Shemesh
- Reuven Abergel
