= Kirya Ne'emana =

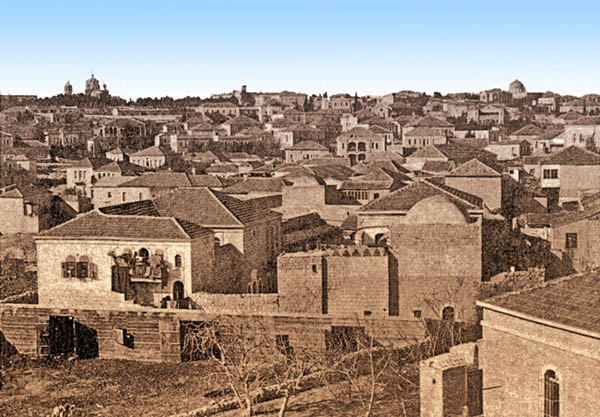
Kirya Ne'emana in 1925

Kirya Ne'emana (Hebrew: קִרְיָה נֶאֱמָנָה, "Faithful City"), commonly known as Batei Nissan Bak (Hebrew: בתי ניסן בק, "Nissan Beck Houses") was a historical Hasidic Jewish neighborhood established opposite Damascus Gate in the New City of Jerusalem in 1875. In the 1880s and 1890s it was joined by additional housing for Syrian, Iraqi, Persian, Georgian, and Caucasian Jews. Most of the residents fled the area during the 1929 Palestine riots and their houses were occupied by Christians and Muslims. In the 2000s a handful of Jewish families reclaimed houses in the neighborhood.

== Etymology ==
The name Kirya Ne'emana comes from Isaiah 1:26:

And I will restore your judges as at the first, and your counselors as at the beginning; afterwards you will be called the city of righteousness, the faithful city.

== History ==
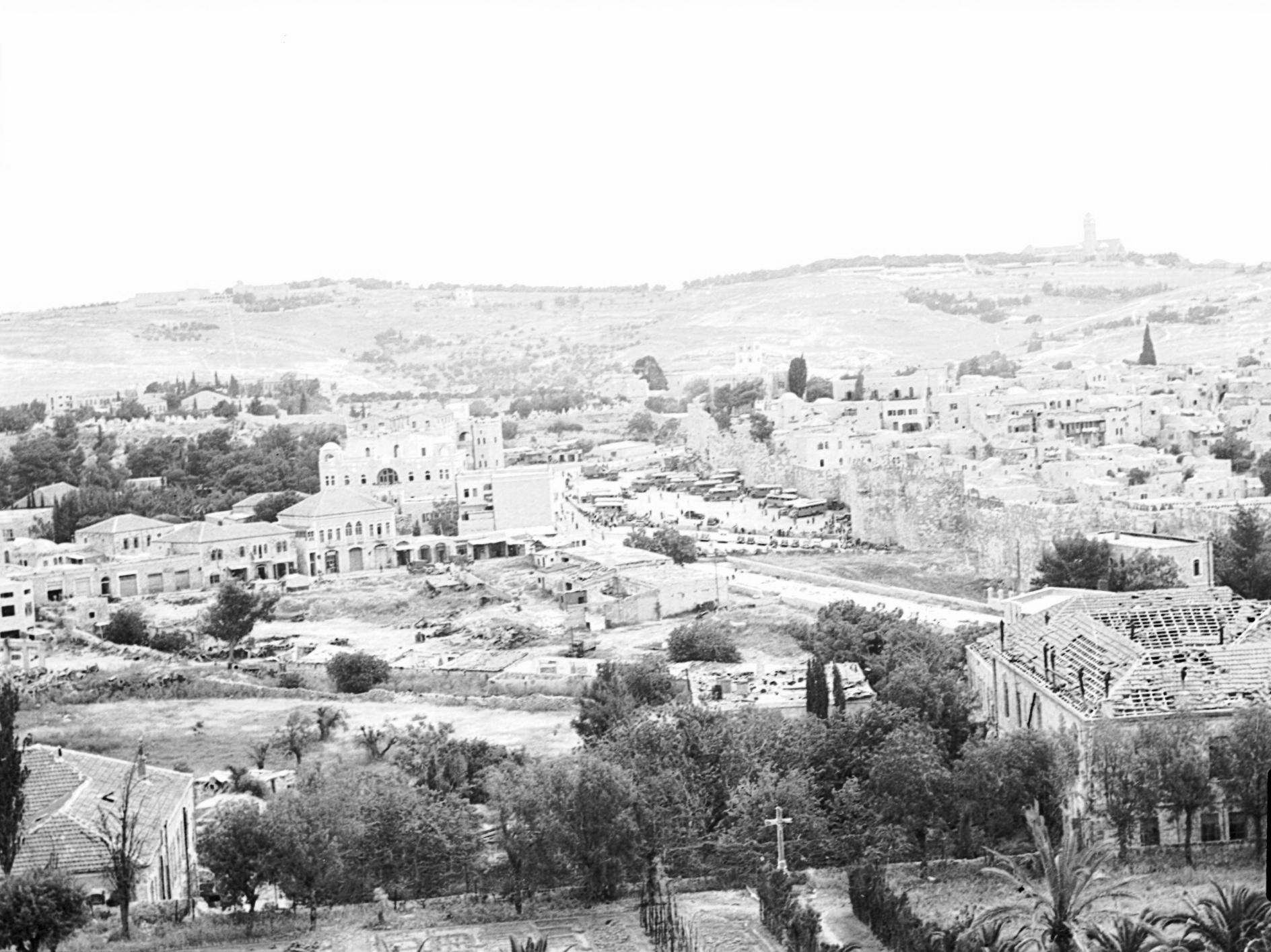
View of former neighborhood of Kirya Ne'emana (left) circa 1950

Kirya Ne'emana was one of the first nine Jewish neighborhoods established outside the Walls of Jerusalem, and one of the six Jewish neighborhoods founded in the 1870s. Kirya Ne'emana was located opposite Damascus Gate along the road to Damascus. The British Mandatory government renamed this road Street of the Prophets in the early 1920s. The neighborhood was established in 1875, the same year as the Beit Ya'akov neighborhood on Jaffa Road. The land was purchased by Nissan Beck, leader of the Hasidic community in Jerusalem, and Rabbi Shmuel Mordechai Warshavsky, under the auspices of Kollel Volhin. The developers wished to honor philanthropist Moses Montefiore and his wife Judith by calling the neighborhood Ohalei Moshe VeYehudit (Tents of Moses and Judith) and its main street, Montefiore Street. For a while, the neighborhood was called Ir Tzedek (Hebrew: עיר צדק, "City of Righteousness", also from the verse in Isaiah 1:26). However, all these names fell out of use and the neighborhood was popularly known as Batei Nissan Bak ("Nissan Beck Houses").

The homes of Kirya Ne'emana were built between 1878 and 1893. Though the developers had procured a sizable piece of land, only 30 of the planned 60 houses were constructed due to lack of financing. The remainder of the land was apportioned to several other groups: Syrian Jews, Iraqi Jews, and Persian Jews. The Persian Jews, who worked in the construction trade, built their own homes, which were generally small and shabby. In the 1890s another neighborhood, Eshel Avraham, was erected next to Kirya Ne'emana for Georgian and Causasian Jews. One hundred homes and a synagogue were initially built in Eshel Avraham, which grew to include five synagogues. The proximity of these Jewish neighborhoods to the Walls of Jerusalem lent a sense of security to Jews walking from Mea Shearim to the Western Wall.

In 1884 the cornerstone was laid for Kirya Ne'emana's sole Hasidic synagogue, Ohalei Yaakov, donated by a wealthy London Jew.

Kirya Ne'emana attracted many prominent Hasidim as residents – including Nissan Beck himself. However, Beck was forced to sell his house to pay off debts and he returned to the Old City to live in a rented flat, where he died in 1890.

By 1897 Kirya Ne'emana and its adjacent neighborhoods numbered 120 homes. A 1916 survey reported a total of 297 homes and 812 residents.

== Evacuation ==
Kirya Ne'emana was hard hit during the Arab riots of 1929. Nineteen residents were killed and buried in a mass grave on the Mount of Olives. Burglaries were rife, homes were destroyed, and three of the area's synagogues were burned. Virtually all the Jewish residents fled the area, save for a handful of Sephardi Jews, and their houses were occupied by Christians and Muslims.

During the 1948 war, the remaining Jews left the area. As a result of the 1949 Armistice Agreement, the border between West and East Jerusalem divided the Jewish homes of Musrara from the now Arab homes of Kirya Ne'emana. The area fell under Israeli control in the Six-Day War but the houses remained Arab-owned. Some of the original buildings, and others that were constructed by Arabs, are located between Nos. 2 to 20 Street of the Prophets. These buildings house workshops, bakeries, and two pilgrim hostels.

In 2001 an organization called Hachomot Hashalem (Hebrew: החומות השלם, "The Complete Walls") began quietly negotiating for Jewish reacquisition of residences in the former neighborhoods of Kirya Ne'emana and Eshel Avraham. By 2004 four families of Jewish settlers had arrived in the area. In 2009 Arutz 7 reported that six Jewish families had reclaimed homes in Kirya Ne'emana.
