= Black Panthers (Israel) =

Protest movement

Black Panthers Hebrew: הפנתרים השחורים
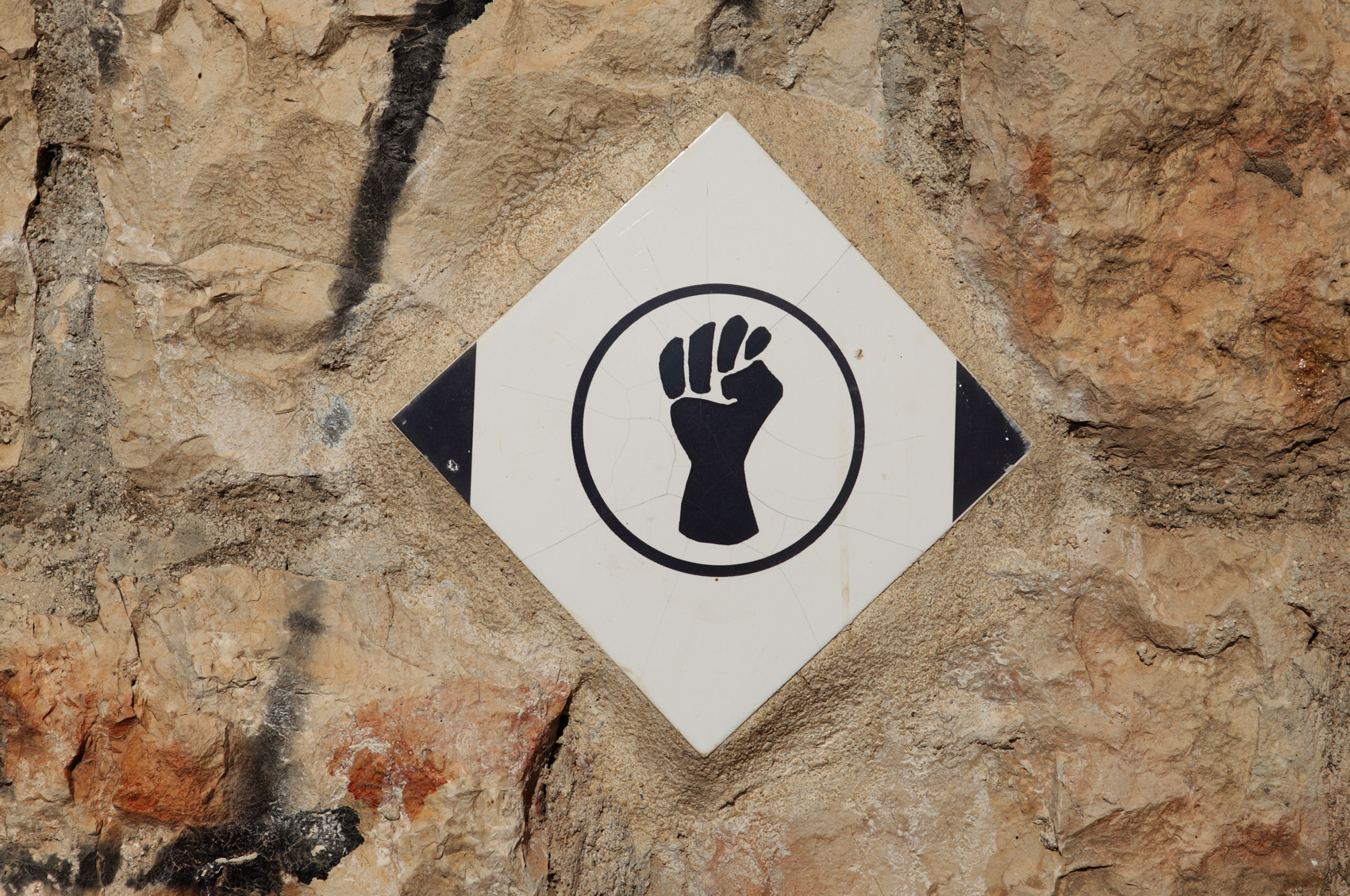
- Founded: 1971
- Merged into: Hadash, Left Camp of Israel
- Ideology: Sephardic and Mizrahi interests Social justice Marxism; Socialism
- Political position: Left-wing
- Most MKs: 1 (1977–1992)
- Fewest MKs: 1 (1977–1992)

Election symbol
- ז

The Black Panthers (Hebrew: הפנתרים השחורים, romanized: HaPanterim HaShchorim) were an Israeli protest movement established by second-generation Jewish immigrants from North Africa, the Arab world, and other parts of the Middle East. The movement was among the earliest in the State of Israel to advocate for the rights and interests of Sephardi and Mizrahi Jews. Its members were influenced by the African American Black Panther Party and used the same name. The group is sometimes referred to as the Israeli Black Panthers to distinguish it from the American organization.

== History ==
In early 1971, the movement was founded by young Maghrebi Jews in the Musrara neighborhood of West Jerusalem, in response to Ashkenazi patterns of discrimination against Mizrahi Jews and Sephardic Jews that had been present throughout the history of the State of Israel.

The movement's founders protested the Ashkenazi establishment's neglect of Mizrahi and Sephardi social issues. The original group consisted of ten members, all children of Moroccan Jews who had settled in Israel. The movement's founders were approximately 18 to 20 years old; most had left school before completing primary education and had spent time in juvenile delinquent institutions. The founders were influenced by the Community Work Division of the Jerusalem Municipality, which introduced them to the mass media as a means of expressing their demands for change. Additional influences included anti-Zionist high school and university students.

The Black Panthers asserted that discrimination against Mizrahi and Sephardi Jews was evident in the differing treatment they perceived from the Ashkenazi establishment toward immigrants from the Soviet Union. Unlike most other Mizrahi organizations in Israel, which were primarily religious, such as Shas, the Black Panthers maintained a secular Jewish orientation.

Originally a wealthy Palestinian neighborhood, Musrara had been depopulated during the Nakba, when its Palestinian residents either fled or were expelled through extraordinary violence imposed on them by Israeli settlers and were not permitted to return. Their homes were subsequently allocated to Jewish immigrants from West Asian and North African countries. Located along the border between Israel and the West Bank, Musrara became a neglected area, with parts designated as a no-man’s land and marked by minefields. Following the 1967 Six-Day War and the Israeli annexation of East Jerusalem, the neighborhood became centrally located within a unified Jerusalem under Israeli administration. The Israeli government developed plans to redevelop the area with high-rise housing intended for Soviet immigrants, a process that would have involved the displacement of the existing Maghrebi-Jewish residents.

Prominent early members of the Israeli Black Panthers movement included Charlie Biton, Saadia Marciano, Roni Orovitz, Meir Levi, Kochavi Shemesh, and Reuven Abergel. The movement gained public attention and presented itself as an advocate for Mizrahi Jews.

=== Protest activities ===
In early 1971, the formation of the Israeli Black Panthers movement was publicized. Around this time, reports emerged that some of the movement’s leaders had criminal records. Authorities expressed concern that unrest similar to the 1959 Wadi Salib riots could recur. Prior to the movement’s first organized demonstration, activist Shimshon Vigodar produced and distributed leaflets in the Musrara neighborhood with three members of Matzpen, a leftist anti-Zionist group. While distributing the materials, they were detained by police. Vigodar later noted that unlike the treatment of Matzpen activists, members of the Black Panthers were arrested prior to demonstrations without specific charges.

In March 1971, the Israel Police denied the Black Panthers a permit to demonstrate, citing the criminal records of some members. Several individuals were arrested to prevent the protest from taking place. Authorities stated that funding would be allocated to address socioeconomic issues in Jerusalem neighborhoods. Despite the denial, the Black Panthers proceeded with an unauthorized demonstration on March 2, 1971, in front of Jerusalem City Hall, to protest poverty, economic inequality, and ethnic discrimination within Israeli Jewish society. The group circulated a leaflet calling for action against class and ethnic discrimination and for the release of the detained organizers. Approximately 200 to 300 people participated, primarily students and intellectuals, rather than residents of Musrara. The protest attracted additional attention in part due to its unauthorized status.

The movement gained public and media visibility and began developing a base of support. On May 18, 1971, the Black Panthers organized a mass demonstration known as "The Night of the Panthers," with an estimated 5,000 to 7,000 participants protesting against discrimination toward Mizrahi Jews. The protest began in Davidka Square and proceeded toward Zion Square, resulting in seven hours of clashes between demonstrators and police. Protesters called for renaming the square to Kikar Yehadut HaMizrah (Mizrahi Jewry Square). This protest was also held without a permit.

Historian Oz Frankel describes the police response during the protest, noting the use by the police of water cannons that sprayed water dyed green, which contributed to panic among the crowd. More than 100 individuals were arrested, including many bystanders, and reports of police brutality were recorded. Arrests continued into the following day. Late in the evening, demonstrators threw three Molotov cocktails. The use of incendiary devices marked a shift in the movement's tactics and contributed to heightened concern among law enforcement and government officials.

Prior to the May protest, on April 13, 1971, representatives of the Black Panthers met with Prime Minister Golda Meir, who characterized them as "not nice people". She regarded the leaders as lawbreakers and declined to formally recognize the group as a legitimate social movement. Following the May 18 protest, the government increased pressure on the Panthers to join the Alliance of Moroccan Immigrants, an establishment-aligned organization. According to historian Oz Frankel, the Panthers temporarily agreed in order to secure the release of jailed members.

The protest and its aftermath prompted the government to engage more seriously with the movement's demands. A public committee was formed to examine claims of discrimination. The committee’s findings acknowledged the existence of ethnic and socioeconomic disparities in Israeli society. In response, government funding for social services and welfare was increased. However, the 1973 Yom Kippur War shifted national priorities toward defense spending, limiting the long-term impact of these policy changes.

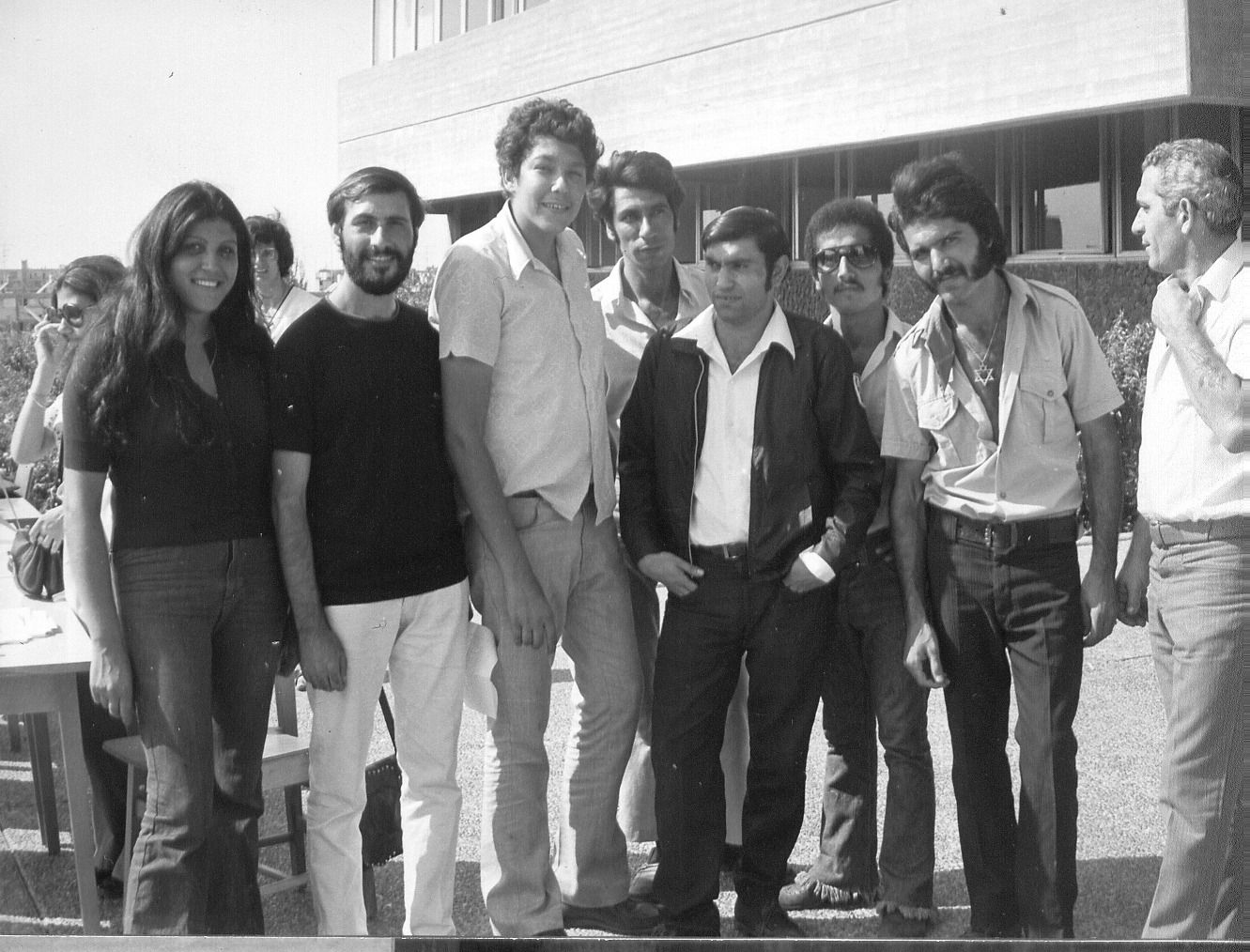
The Black Panther Party at Tel Aviv University in 1972. From left to right: Tova Gohar, Yigal Bin-Nun, Sami Gohr, Felix Zagron, Kochavi Shemesh, Yitzhak Cohen, Amram Cohen and Yaakov Elbaz

Despite initial momentum, the Black Panthers faced challenges in expanding into a nationwide grassroots movement. Internal disagreements and limited organizational capacity hindered their efforts. Between March and August 1971, the group held additional demonstrations. Their base of support remained strongest in Musrara, and included neighborhood youth as well as some intellectuals and left-wing student groups. Key figures such as Charlie Biton and Reuven Abergel played central roles in the organization, which retained elements of a neighborhood-based structure.

The movement made connections with members of the Knesset, the Histadrut labor federation, and the Jewish Agency for Israel. However, the scale of public and governmental engagement with the Black Panthers quickly declined as the group struggled to mobilize broader sections of the population.

=== Electoral politics ===
The Panthers eventually moved into electoral politics, but without success, at least in part because of internal disputes and struggles. In the 1973 Knesset elections the party won 13,332 votes (0.9%), just short of the 1% threshold. For the 1977 elections Charlie Biton ran on the Hadash list. He was re-elected three times, before leaving Hadash to establish the Black Panthers as an independent Knesset faction in 1990.

Some of the movement’s leaders later joined other political parties, including the Tami and Shas parties, which advocated for Mizrahi interests. The Black Panthers played a significant role in raising awareness of what became known as the "Mizrahi question," contributing to political discourse in the 1970s and 1980s. Their activism influenced the rise of the right-wing Likud party during that period, which gained electoral support among Mizrahi voters. Over subsequent decades, Mizrahi Jews became increasingly integrated into Israel’s political, cultural, military, and economic sectors. According to journalist Asaf Elia-Shalev, the efforts of Mizrahi activists helped empower a generation of Mizrahi artists and scholars, encouraging the expression of cultural identity through music, literature, and dance. Mizrahi culture has since become a prominent component of mainstream Israeli society.

=== Israeli government infiltration ===
In 2007, the Israel State Archives released documents revealing that Ya’akov Elbaz, a prominent figure in the Black Panthers, had been a police informant. Elbaz, who was approximately 40 years old at the time and known for involvement in organized crime, joined the group shortly after its first protest. He was reportedly recruited by the police to monitor the organization’s activities. According to detective Avraham Turgiman, "The police were worried that the Panthers would use violence like the U.S. Black Panthers, so they wanted to be informed on their activities". Elbaz was allegedly paid by the police, and authorities overlooked his activities related to pimping.

Elbaz contributed financially to the movement and strongly advocated for violence. He was eventually elected president of the organization. Kochavi Shemesh, a member of the Panthers, stated that Elbaz “was one of the leaders who promoted violent struggle, provided Molotov cocktails, and was a provocateur on behalf of the police". Charlie Biton later said: “I now know that Elbaz was planted by the police in the organization to try to make it look more radical".

Internal documents released from the State Archives, including newsletters and reports, suggest that Elbaz regularly provided information on the group’s activities. It is likely that the police had additional informants within the organization. The presence of informers contributed to internal mistrust and discord, affecting the group’s cohesion and operational effectiveness.

== The name "Black Panther" ==
The Israeli Black Panthers adopted their name from the United States Black Panther Party, as did groups in the United Kingdom, West Indies, West Africa, and South Asia. These groups shared experiences shaped by migration and employed grassroots strategies and interethnic cooperation to address perceived racial and social inequalities. In Israel, the name was proposed by one of the party's founders, Sa'adia Marciano.

There are two accounts regarding how the Israeli group chose its name. One suggests that Marciano or fellow founder Charlie Biton encountered American activist Angela Davis, who had ties to the U.S. Black Panther Party, and that this interaction influenced the naming and ideological orientation of the Israeli group. Another account claims that a neighborhood social worker remarked that the group resembled the U.S. Black Panthers, prompting them to adopt the name.

Marciano, known for organizing against police profiling, is said to have suggested forming a Black Panther Party in Israel during a 1970 meeting with local activists. He aimed for the group to reflect the organizational style and militancy associated with the U.S. Black Panther Party. The choice of name was also considered a strategic move to attract media attention, which it did.

The group believed that using the name would resonate with Ashkenazi Jews in Israel and abroad, many of whom were familiar with Black American history due to U.S. cultural influence. They anticipated that the provocative name would help sustain the group’s visibility, in contrast to earlier, less-recognized Eastern activist organizations. While initially possessing limited knowledge of the U.S. Black Panthers, the Israeli group broadly identified with their message and drew inspiration for their protest activities. They were familiar with elements of African-American history and renamed their neighborhood of Musrara as "Harlem/Musrara" in symbolic alignment.

The Israeli Black Panthers identified with Black Americans in their experiences of discrimination and marginalization. They viewed Israeli society as divided by ethnic and class lines, and rejected the idea that assimilation was a viable solution to their concerns.

== Commemoration ==
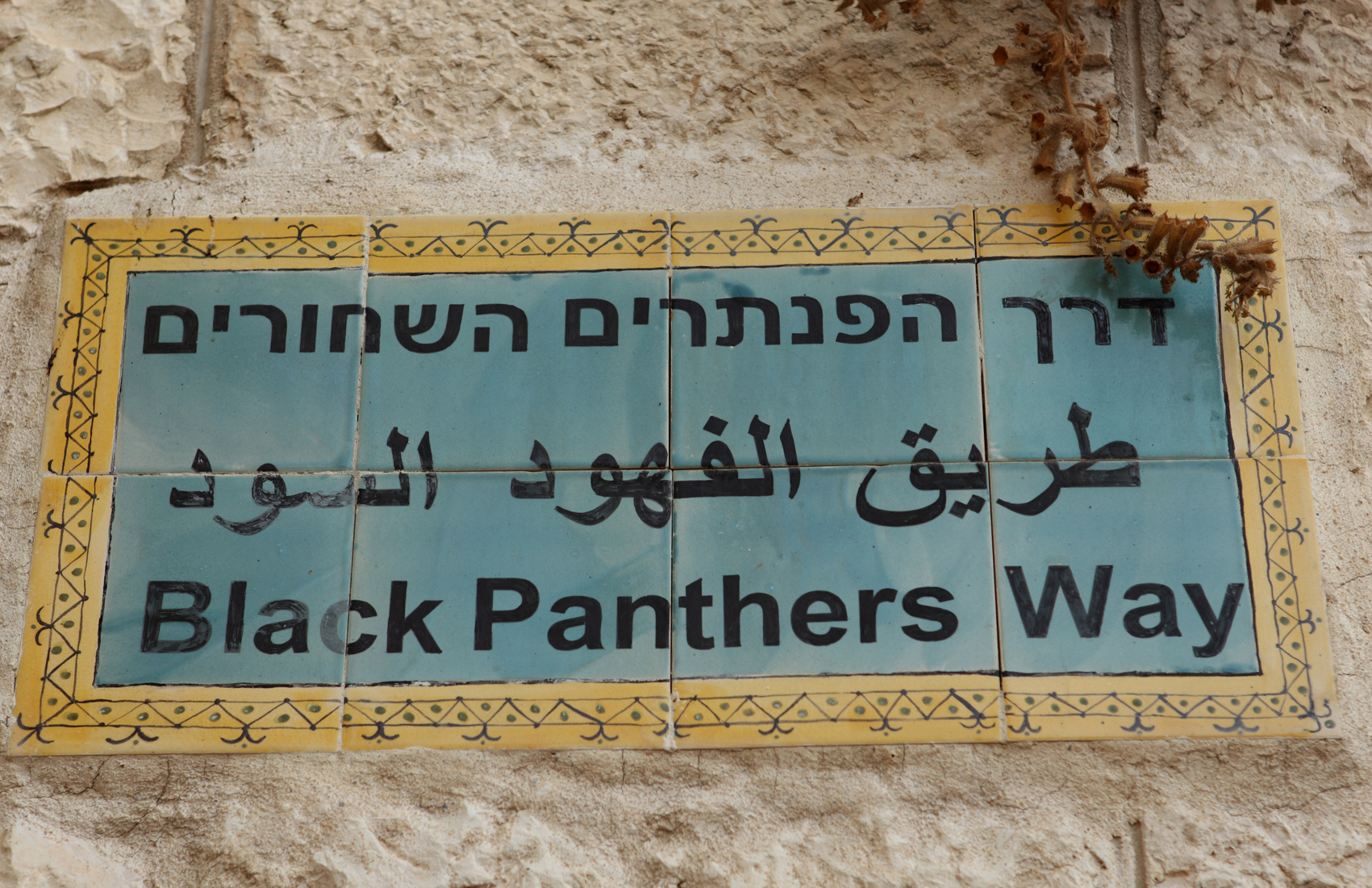
Black Panthers Way in Jerusalem

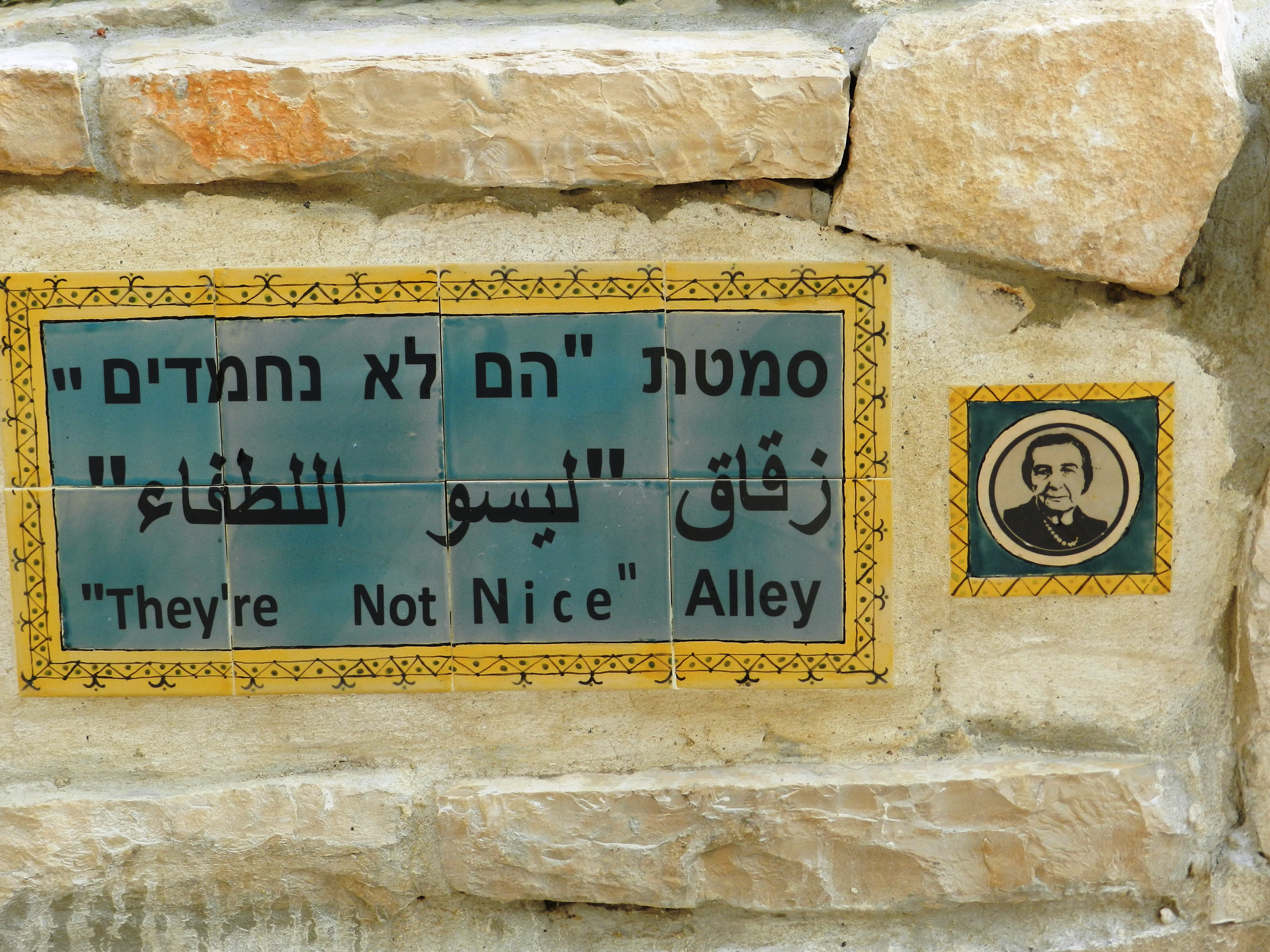
"They're Not Nice" Alley in Jerusalem

In the late 1990s and early 2000s, a movement known as the Russian Panthers was established in Israel, referencing the Black Panther Party, after attacks against Russian-speaking immigrants.

In 2011, a group of activists named two paths in the Musrara neighborhood of Jerusalem "Black Panthers Way" and "They're Not Nice Alley." The latter name references a remark made by former Prime Minister Golda Meir about the Israeli Black Panthers.

== See also ==
- Wadi Salib riots
- Equality in Israel – Panthers
