= Reuven Abergel =

Moroccan-Israeli activist

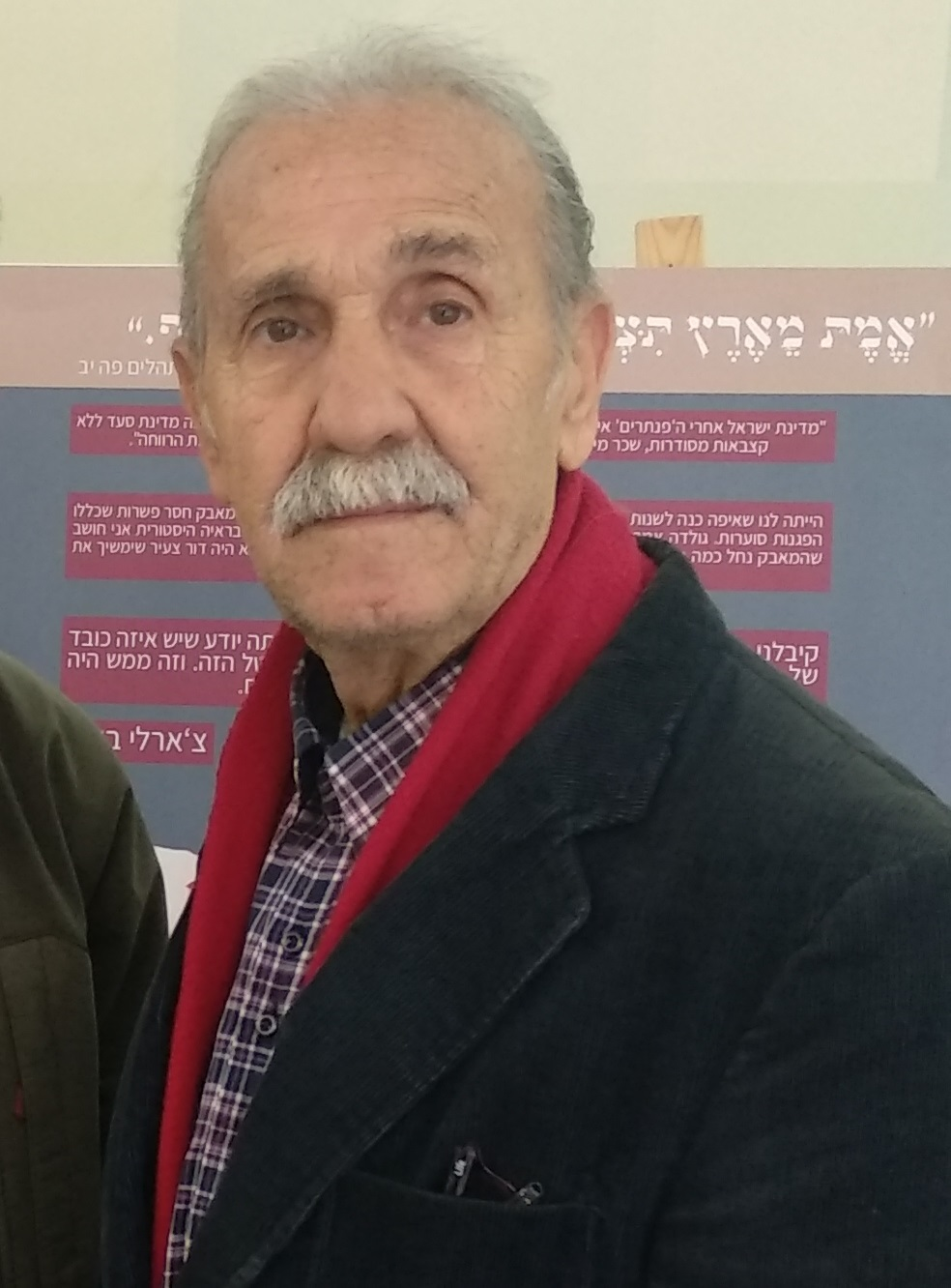
Reuven Abergel

Reuven Abergel (Hebrew: ראובן אברג'ל, Arabic: رَؤوبين أبيرجل; born 26 December 1943) is a Moroccan-Israeli social and political activist and a co-founder and former leader of the Israeli Black Panthers.

== Biography ==
Reuven Abergel was born in 1943 in Rabat, Morocco, the fourth of eight children. He immigrated to Israel with his parents and seven siblings in 1950. The family was sent to the immigrant tent camp in Pardes Hana. Later they moved to Musrara, a former Palestinian neighborhood in Jerusalem whose residents were forced to abandon their homes following the 1948 war.

== Political activism ==
In response to the Wadi Salib riots in Haifa, Abergel began to distribute leaflets around his neighborhood. He co-founded the Israeli Black Panthers following the arrest of his friends. He became a leader of the movement and his home became its headquarters. He was present at the group's meeting with then-Prime Minister Golda Meir. Since then Abergel has been active in the struggle for social justice and peace in Israel/Palestine as a member of various groups and movements. He currently serves on the board of the Mizrahi Democratic Rainbow Coalition and was elected to the leadership of Tarabut ("connection"), a joint Jewish-Palestinian political party for peace and equality in Israel.

== See also ==
- Charlie Biton
- Kochavi Shemesh
- Saadia Marciano
