= Wadi Salib riots =

1959 street demonstrations in Haifa, Israel

The Wadi Salib riots were a series of street demonstrations and acts of vandalism in the Wadi Salib neighborhood of Haifa, Israel, in 1959. They were sparked by the shooting of a Moroccan Jewish immigrant by police officers. Demonstrators accused the police of ethnic discrimination against Mizrahi Jews.

Israeli scholar Oren Yiftachel characterizes the riots as "the first wave of Mizrahi protest outside the [development] towns."

== History ==
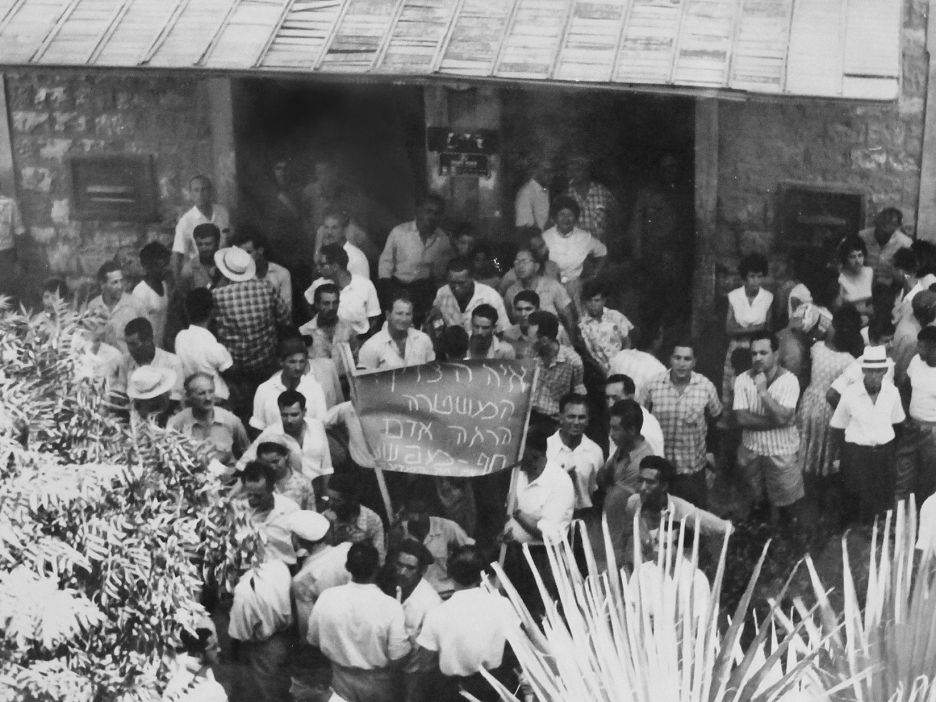
Wadi Salib residents demonstrating in front of a Haifa police station after the shooting of Yaakov Elkarif

On July 9, 1959, police confronted a Wadi Salib resident, Yaakov Elkarif, who was drunk and disturbing the peace. When he began behaving erratically and hurling empty bottles at the police sent to arrest him, he was shot and seriously wounded. Residents surrounded the police vehicle and dragged an officer out of it. He was released only after shots were fired in the air.

Conflicting testimonies arose from the event. One witness claimed Elkarif provoked the officer through threats. Another witness offered that Elkarif, perceived as a stereotypical Moroccan immigrant—i.e., violent and hot-tempered—was shot for his lack of standing in society. Lastly, another witness claimed that the officer fired with the intention of calming the situation, which resulted in Elkarif's accidental shooting.

After false rumors circulated that he had died, several hundred Wadi Salib residents marched to Hadar HaCarmel, a predominantly Ashkenazi district, smashing shop windows and setting cars on fire. Back in Wadi Salib, the angry demonstrators targeted the headquarters of Mapai [Labor Party] and the Histadrut (the Israeli congress of trade unions). The police tried to disperse the demonstrators by force, leaving 13 police and 2 demonstrators wounded. 34 demonstrators were arrested.

On July 11, riots broke out elsewhere in Israel, particularly in large communities of Maghrebi immigrants, like Tiberias, Beersheba, and Migdal HaEmek. It was claimed the riots were not completely spontaneous, and that a local movement, Likud Yotsei Tsfon Africa (Union of North African Immigrants) was involved in planning some of them. David Ben-Haroush, one of the movement's founders, was sent to prison. Ben-Haroush ran for the next Knesset elections while incarcerated, on the Union's list, though he failed to cross the electoral threshold.

Shay Hazkani sees the struggle of Moroccan Jews against Ashkenazi racism in Israel that led to the Wadi Salib riots as an extension of the anti-colonial struggle they had been engaged in against France in Morocco.

== Ashkenazi-Mizrahi relations ==
Discrimination against Mizrahim is believed to have been one of the main catalysts of the riot. This event marked the initial recognition of ethnic discrimination among Israeli Jews. Prior the creation of the State of Israel in 1948, the term “Mizrahim“ was not commonly used, but entered the Jewish lexicon as a term used broadly to refer to Jews of Middle Eastern and North African ancestry. The Mizrahim were viewed as passive recipients, whereas the Ashkenazim actively contributed to the creation of the Zionist vision of a Jewish-national community in Israel.

The Wadi Salib riots still resonate in Israeli society as a symptom of the social malaise that led to clashes between Mizrahi and Ashkenazi Jews.

== Legacy ==
In 1959, Jewish Israeli author Leah Goldberg's children's short story and poem Room for Rent was reprinted as a book reportedly due to its message on tolerance and as a reaction to the Wadi Salib Riots.

In 1979, Amos Gitai produced a film on the subject—Me'urot Wadi Salib ["the events of Wadi Salib"]. The Wadi Salib riots have been discussed in many scholarly articles.
