= Musrara =

Neighborhood in Jerusalem, Israel

Coordinates: 31°46′57″N 35°13′32″E

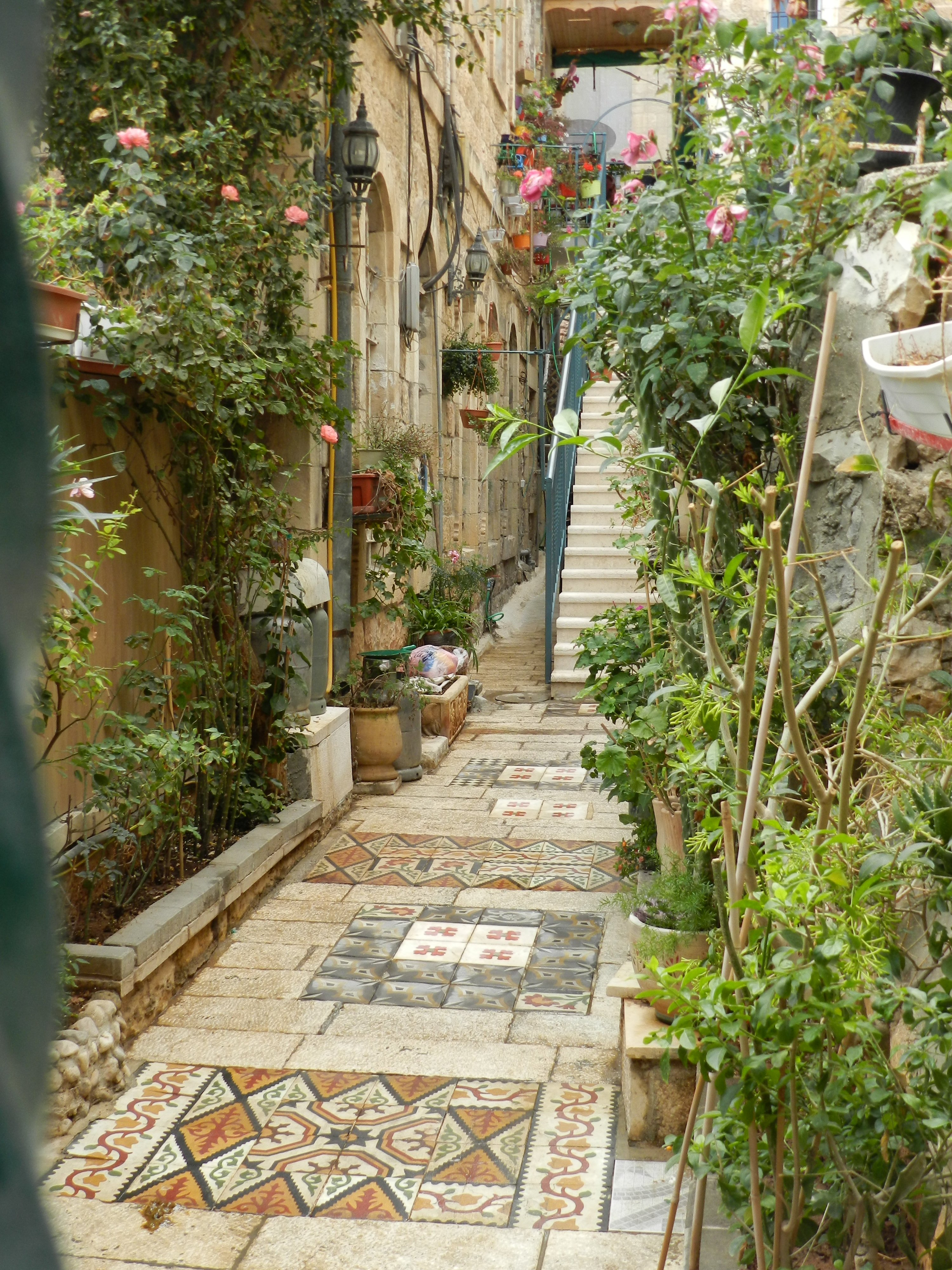
Home in Musrara

Musrara (Arabic: مصرارة, Hebrew: מוסררה, also known by its Hebrew name, Morasha, מורשה) is a formerly Ottoman neighborhood in what is now West Jerusalem. It is bordered by the Israeli neighborhoods of Mea Shearim and Beit Yisrael to the north, by the Russian Compound and Kikar Safra to the west, and by Mamilla mall to the south, and the Old City to the east.

== History ==
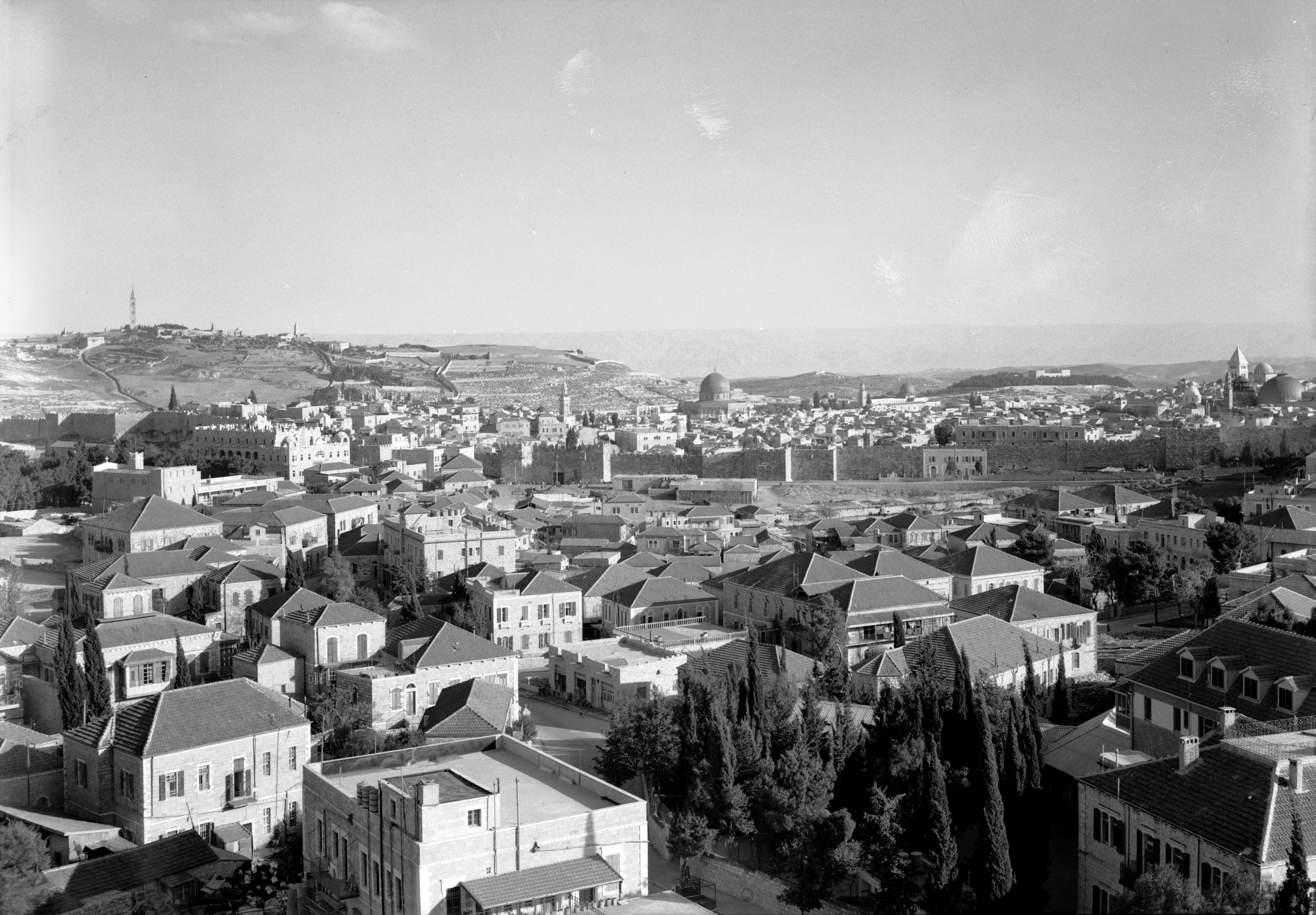
Musrara, 1934-1939

Musrara was founded by upper class Arab Christians residents during the late 19th century, as a part of the "departure from the walls", during which people began living outside the Old City of Jerusalem.

During the 1947–1949 Palestine war, the Arab residents fled during the fighting or were expelled as part of the larger 1948 Palestinian expulsion and flight and not permitted to return to their homes. Musrara remained on the Israeli side of the border between Israel and Jordan.

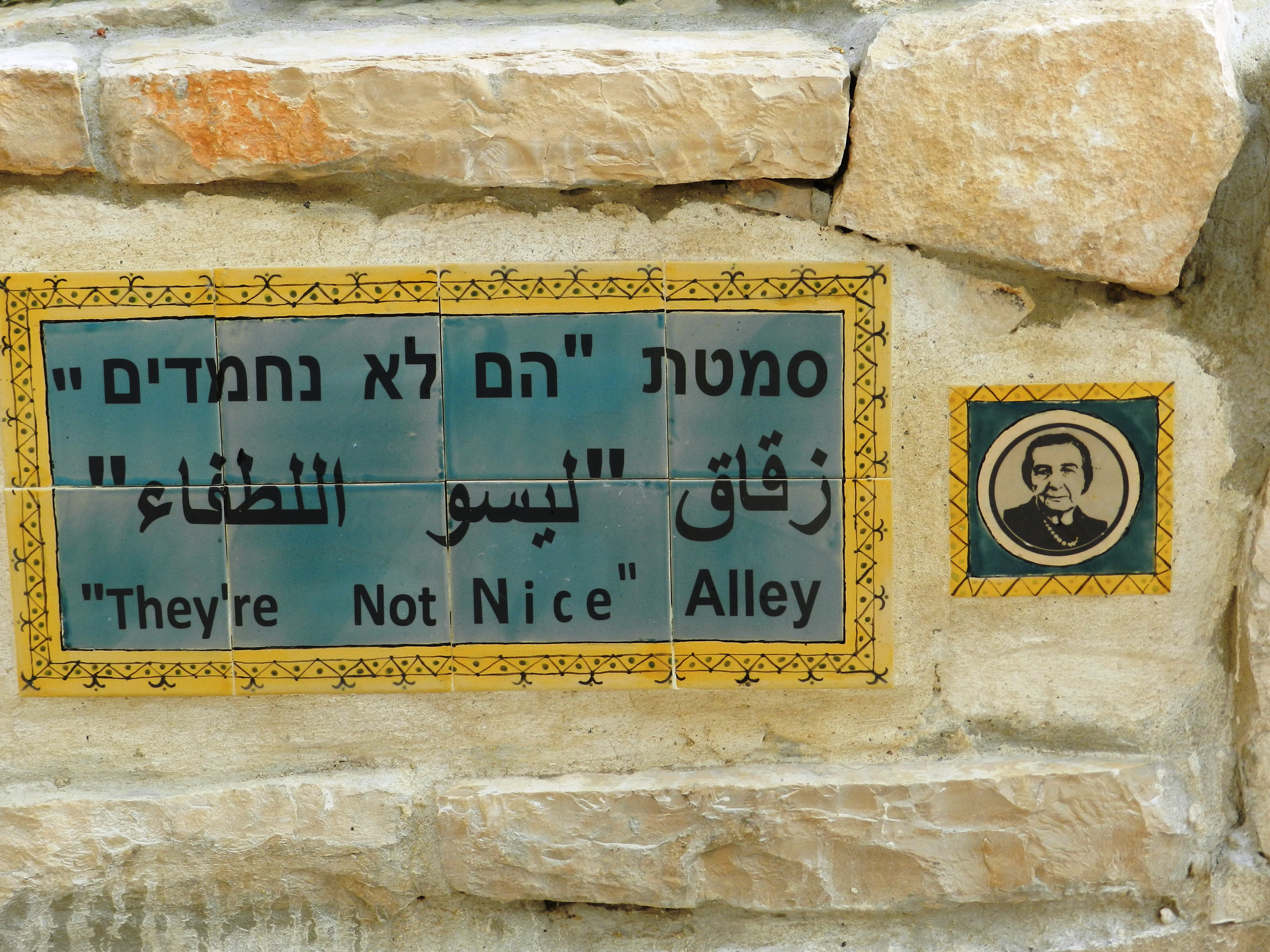
"They're not nice" alley, Musrara

During the early days of Israeli statehood, there was an extreme shortage of housing for the thousands of Jewish immigrants who flooded to Jerusalem. As a result, the Ministry of Housing decided to populate the Palestinian houses with new immigrants from North African countries.

In 1971, young, second-generation Mizrahi Jews from the neighborhood founded the Israeli Black Panthers, a protest movement against the perceived injustice and discrimination by the government against them. The rage quickly spread from Musrara to all areas inhabited by poor Mizrahi Jews, and eventually evolved into a political movement.

Musrara's strategic location between the Haredi and religious neighborhoods to the north and the secular neighborhoods to the west has contributed to its diverse population. Over the last decade some have advocated to prevent the neighborhood from becoming more Hareidi, a process which has since slowed considerably.

Today, Musrara is home to about 4,500 people.

== Architecture ==
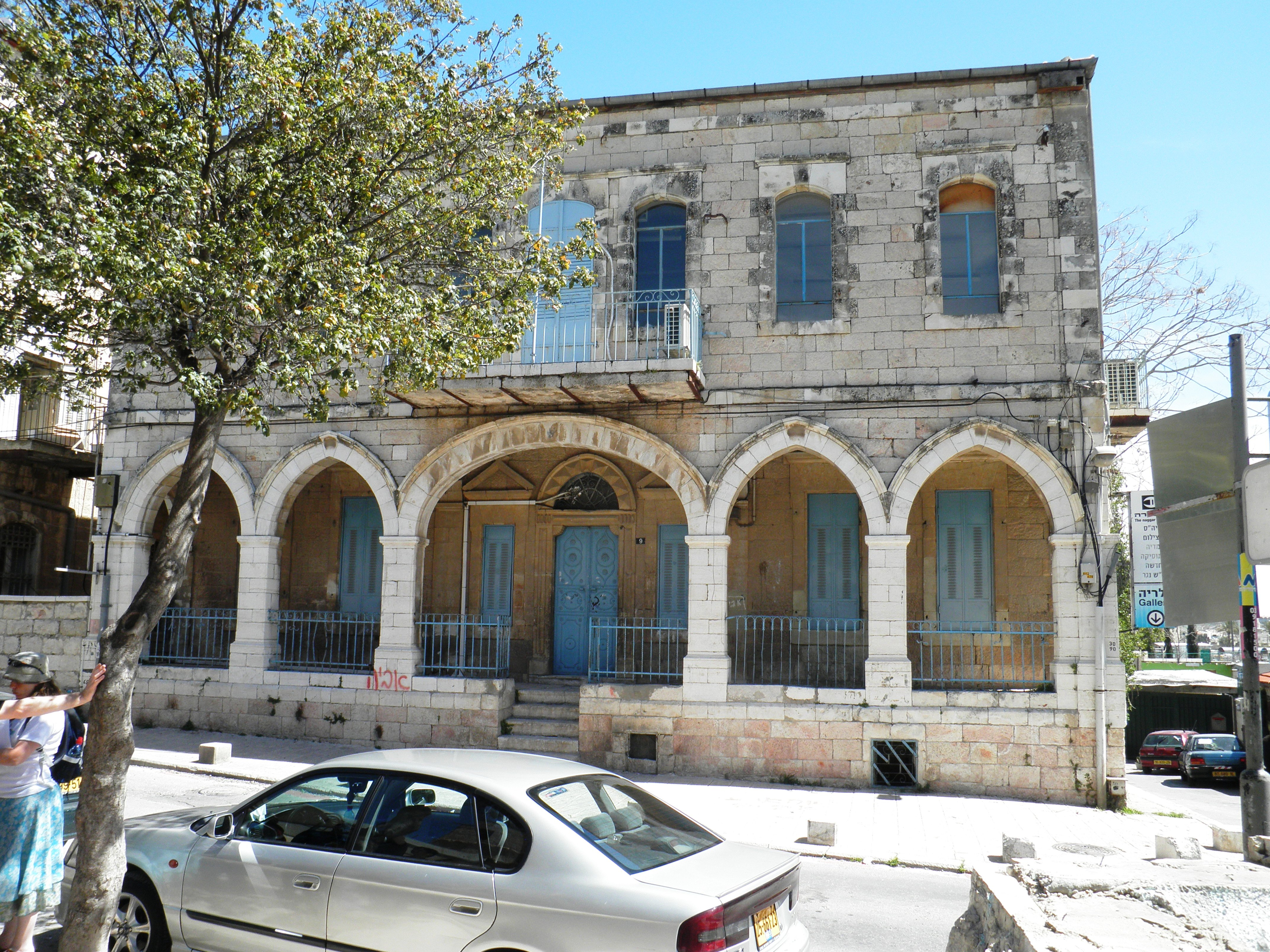
Architecture in Musrara

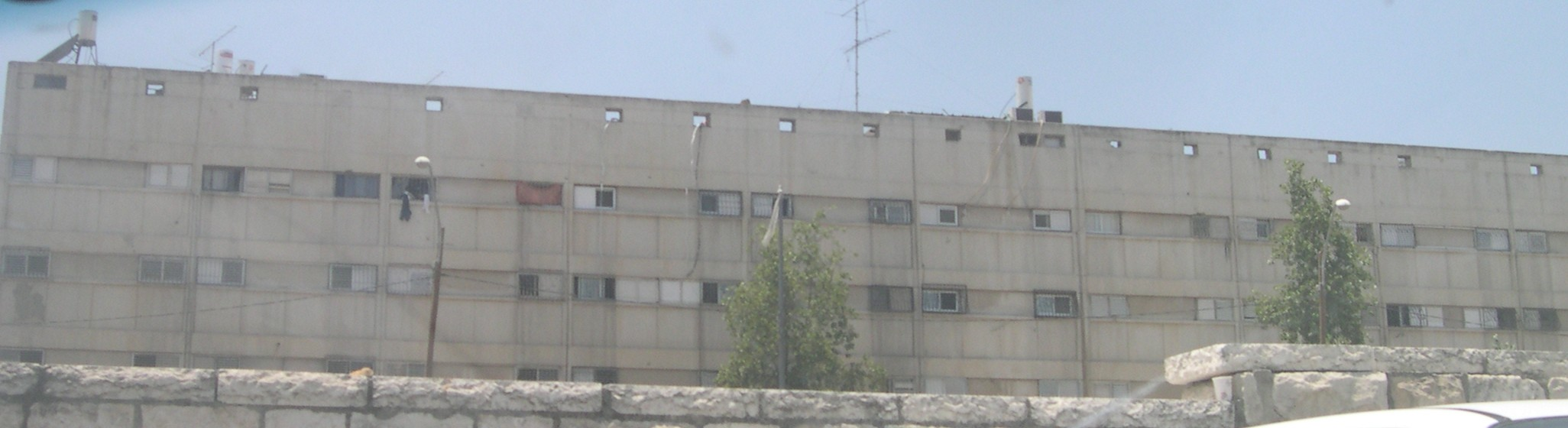
Tenement housing built to accommodate the influx of new immigrants in the early years of Israeli statehood

Musrara's built environment is a living testimony to its diversity – and that of Jerusalem in general – over the past 130 years. Examples of the various styles of architecture popular during this period can be found there. They can be divided into three general periods:

The first phase was the Arab phase, in which large, luxurious mansions were built by wealthy Arabs attempting to escape the overcrowding in the Old City during the late 19th century. These houses have grand entrances, beautiful masonry and shingled roofs.

The second phase began with the War of Independence. In the ensuing upheaval and unsettled conditions that arose along the unpeaceful new border with Jordan, houses were abandoned and new residents struggled. The neighborhood scene was one of unemployment, poverty and neglect. Conditions contributed to the rise of the Israeli Black Panther movement among new olim (Jewish immigrants) from North Africa. This phase lasted through the 1970s.

The third period, beginning in the 1980s, saw increased activity as a result of a Jerusalem Municipality program to improve the neighborhood's appearance. Development regulations were adopted that were intended to restore the neighborhood's former glory. Renovations were subsequently completed in the style of the historic Arab structures. In many buildings, though, a clear line can be seen between lower floors, built in the historic Arab style, and upper storeys built in the unadorned functional style of modern multistorey buildings. These lines reflect the decisions of real estate developers who, in the interest of cost savings, did not want to maintain the more expensive style of traditional facades on upper levels.

== Art and culture ==
Musrara is now a center of the arts, home to the Naggar Multidisciplinary School of Art and Society also known as "Musrara", the Eastern Music Center, the Jerusalem Municipality's art center, and Polis - the Jerusalem Institute of Languages and Humanities.

Since 2009, the "Muslala" group, composed of artists, creators and residents of the neighborhood, has been developing art routes: different artist are invited to create site-specific interventions in the neighborhood public space, and the public is invited to follow in their steps, using maps that are distributed for free. The group also started the Musrara community garden.

A floor mosaic found in the quarter is displayed at the Mardigian Museum of Armenian Art and Culture.

Ma'aleh School of Television, Film and the Arts is located in Musrara.

== Notable residents ==
- Sirhan Sirhan, assassin of Senator Robert F. Kennedy
- Reuven Abergel, one of the founders of the Israeli Black Panthers

== See also ==
- Expansion of Jerusalem in the 19th century
- Kirya Ne'emana, a Jewish neighbourhood within Musrara quarter
