= List of Israelis =

Flag of Israel ( דגל ישראל )

Location of Israel

Lists of Israelis

By ethnicity
Israeli Jews:
Ethiopian Jews

Arab citizens of Israel:
Arab Muslims, Druze, Arab Christians

Various:
Circassians
By descent
Afghan, Algerian, American, Argentine, Armenian, Australian, Austrian

Belarusian, Belgian, Bosnian, Brazilian, British, Bulgarian

Canadian, Chilean, Chinese, Croatian, Czech

Danish, Dutch

Egyptian, Estonian, Ethiopian

Finnish, French

Georgian, German, Greek, Guatemalan

Hungarian

Indian, Iranian, Iraqi, Irish, Italian

Kazakhstani

Latvian, Libyan, Lithuanian

Mexican, Moldovan, Moroccan, Nigerian

Polish

Romanian, Russian

Serbian, Slovak, South African, Sudanese, Swedish, Swiss, Syrian

Tunisian, Turkish

Ukrainian, Uzbekistani

Yemeni
By place of residence

This is a list of notable Israelis. Israelis (Hebrew: ישראלים Yiśraʾelim) are the citizens or permanent residents of the State of Israel. The largest ethnic groups in Israel are Jews (75%), followed by Arabs (20%) and other minorities (5%).

== Academics ==
=== Archaeology ===
- Israel Finkelstein (born 1949)
- Amihai Mazar (born 1942)
- Benjamin Mazar (1906–1995)
- Eilat Mazar (1956–2021)
- Yigael Yadin (1917–1984)

=== Biology and medicine ===
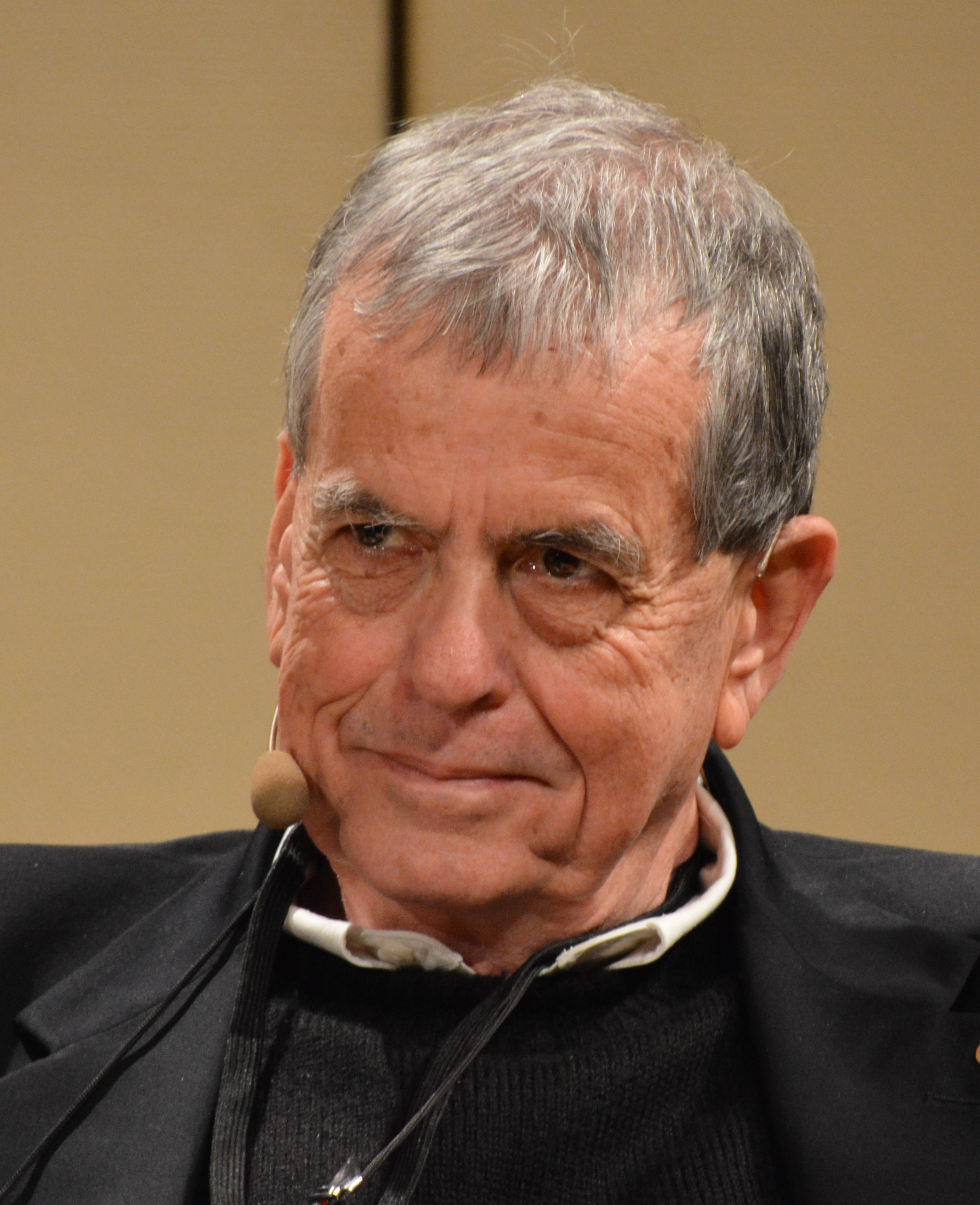
Nobel Prize winner Aaron Ciechanover

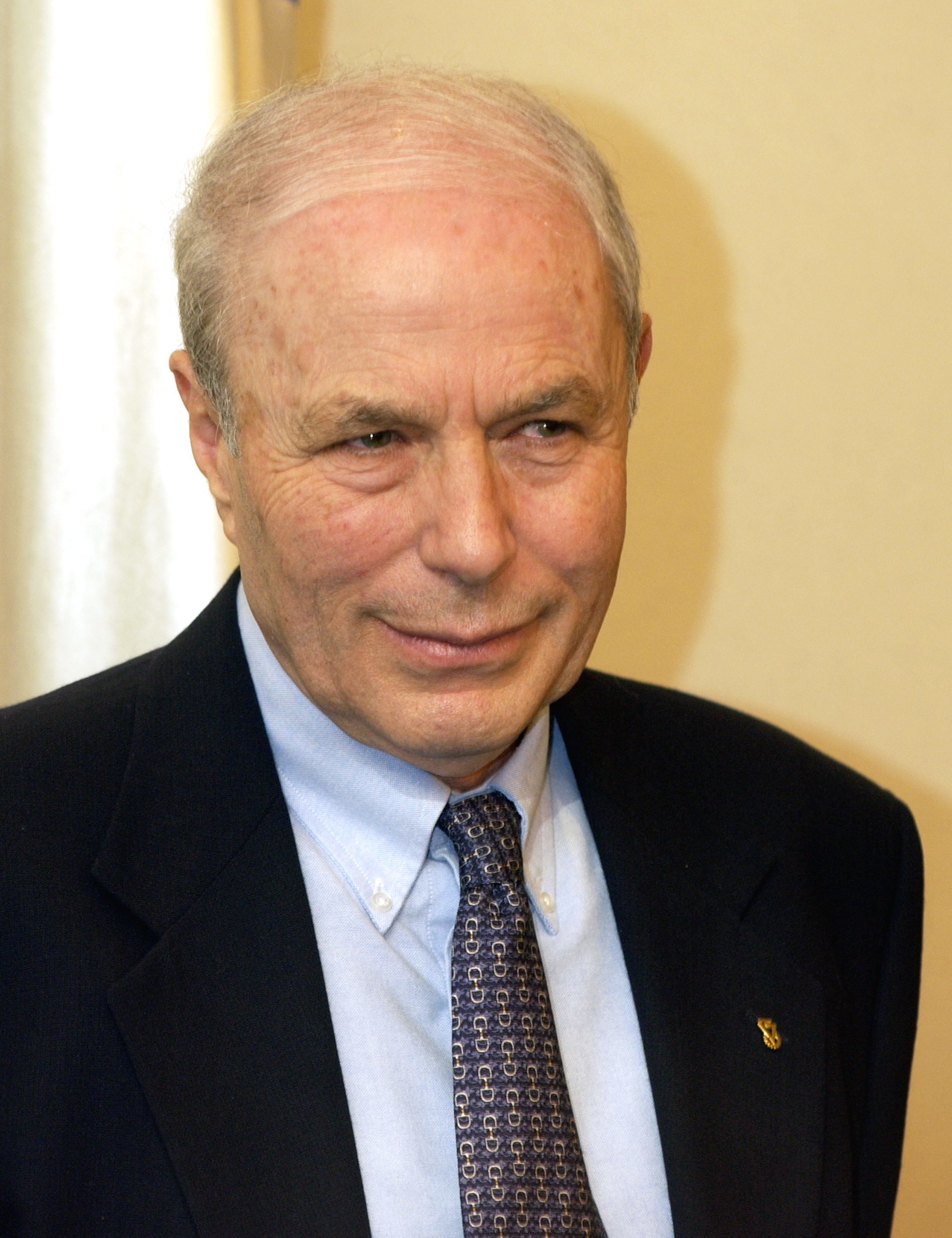
Nobel Prize winner Avram Hershko

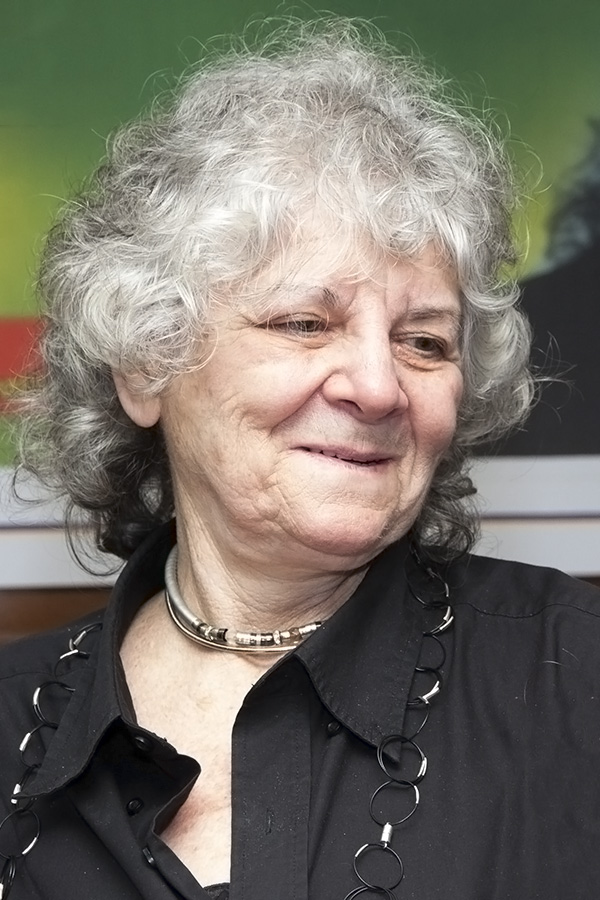
Nobel Prize winner Ada Yonath

- Aaron Valero – Professor of Medicine, founder of Faculty of Medicine at the Technion, director of government hospital
- Aaron Ciechanover and Avram Hershko – ubiquitin system; Lasker Award (2000), Nobel Prize in Chemistry (2004)
- Moshe Feldenkrais (1904–1984) – invented Feldenkrais Method used in movement therapy
- Hossam Haick – inventor of an electric nose for diagnosis of cancer
- Israel Hanukoglu – structures of cytoskeletal keratins, NADP binding proteins, steroidogenic enzymes, Epithelial Sodium Channels (ENaC)
- Gavriel Iddan – inventor of capsule endoscopy
- Danny Ionescu – aquatic microbial ecologist
- Benjamin Kahn – marine biologist, defender of the Red Sea reef
- Alexander Levitzki – cancer research; Wolf Prize in Medicine (2005)
- Yadin Dudai – memory research
- Gideon Mer – scientist, malaria control
- Saul Merin – ophthalmologist, author of Inherited Eye Diseases
- Raphael Mechoulam – chemist, discoverer of tetrahydrocannabinol and anandamide
- Leo Sachs – blood cell research; Wolf Prize in Medicine (1980)
- Asya Rolls – psychoneuroimmunologist
- Michael Sela and Ruth Arnon – developed Copaxone; Wolf Prize in Medicine (1998)
- Michal Schwartz – neuroimmunology of age-related neurological disease
- Rahel Straus (1880–1963) – German-Jewish medical doctor and feminist
- Joel Sussman – 3D structure of acetylcholinesterase, Elkeles Prize for Research in Medicine (2005)
- Meir Wilchek – affinity chromatography; Wolf Prize in Medicine (1987)
- Ada Yonath – structure of ribosome, Nobel Prize in Chemistry (2009)
- Amotz Zahavi – Handicap Principle
- Abraham Zangen – psycholobiology

=== Computing and mathematics ===
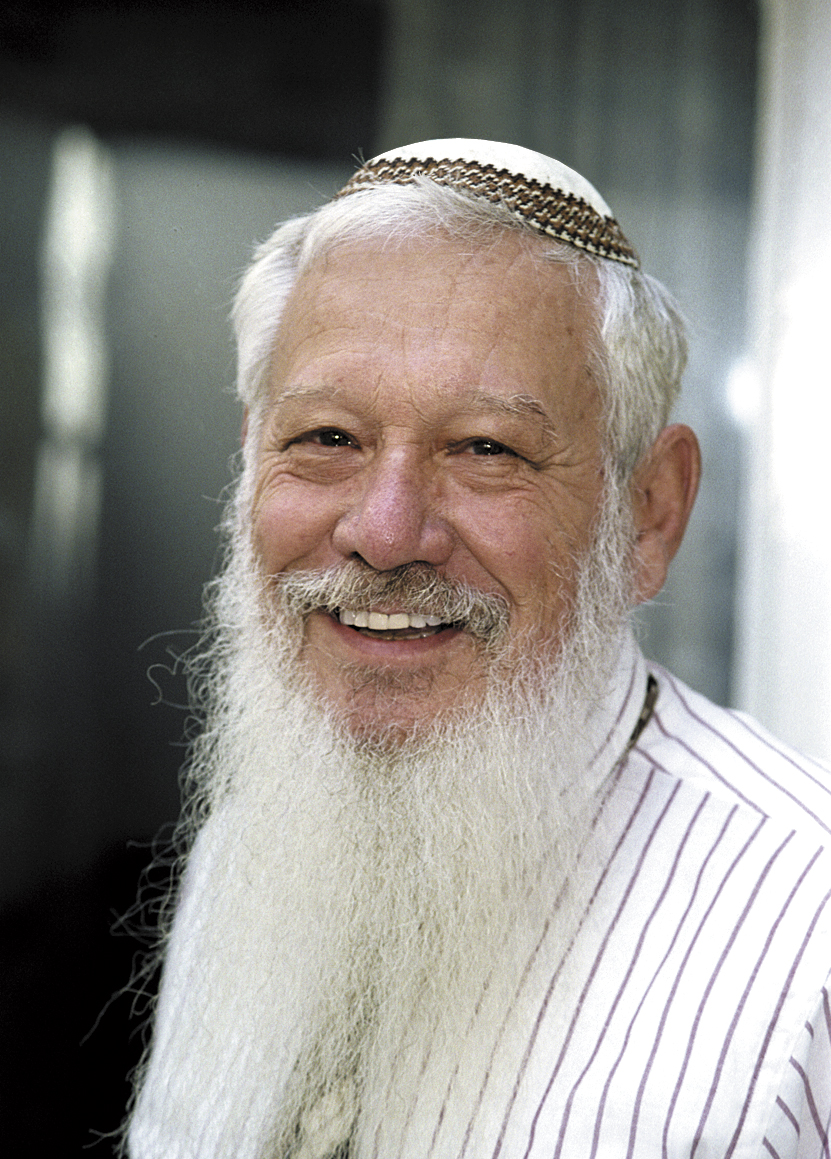
Nobel Prize winner Robert Aumann

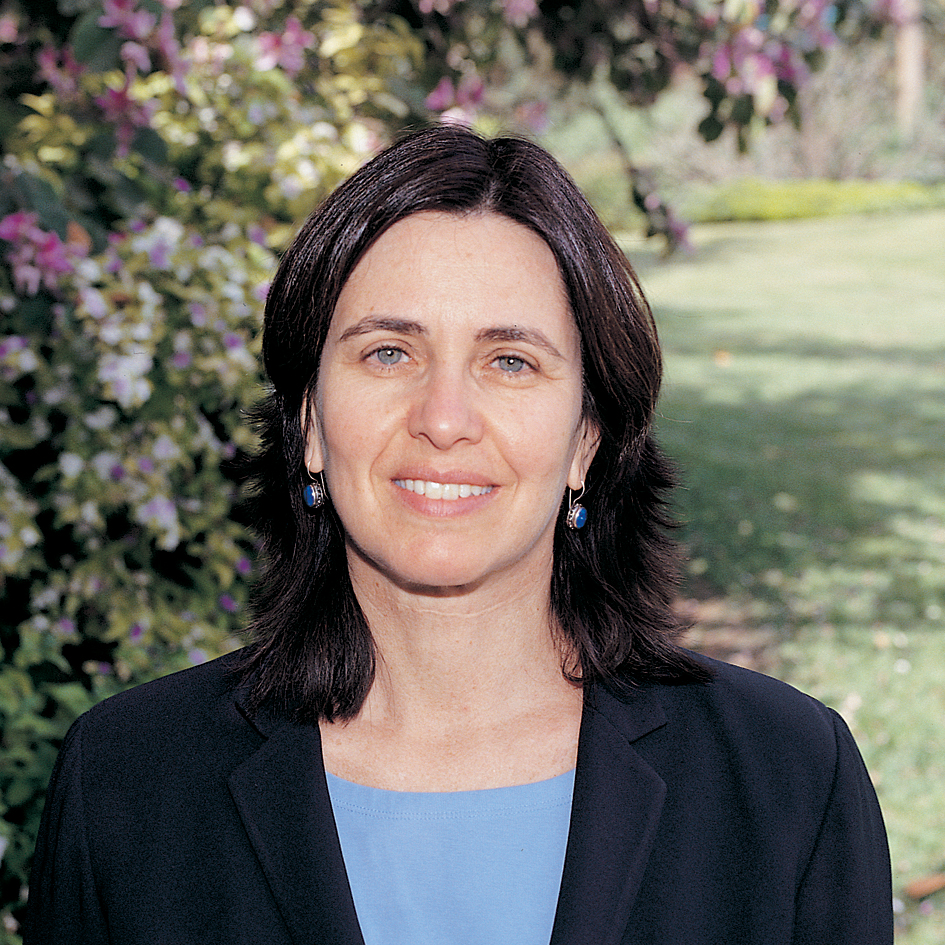
Shafi Goldwasser

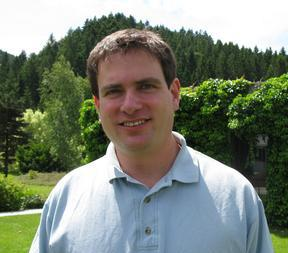
Elon Lindenstrauss

- Ron Aharoni – mathematician
- Noga Alon – mathematician, computer scientist, winner of the Gödel Prize (2005)
- Shimshon Amitsur – mathematician ring theory abstract algebra
- Robert Aumann – mathematician game theory; Nobel Memorial Prize in Economic Sciences (2005)
- Amir Ban and Shay Bushinsky – programmers of Junior (chess)
- Yehoshua Bar-Hillel – machine translation
- Joseph Bernstein – mathematician
- Eli Biham – differential cryptanalysis
- Yair Censor – mathematician
- Aryeh Dvoretzky – mathematician, eighth president of the Weizmann Institute of Science
- Uriel Feige – computer scientist, winner of the Gödel Prize (2001)
- Abraham Fraenkel – ZF set theory
- Hillel Furstenberg – mathematician; Wolf Prize in Mathematics (2006/7)
- Shafi Goldwasser – computer scientist, winner of the Gödel Prize (1993 and 2001)
- David Harel – computer science; Israel Prize (2004)
- Gad M. Landau – computer scientist
- Abraham Lempel and Jacob Ziv – LZW compression; IEEE Richard W. Hamming Medal (2007 and 1995)
- Joram Lindenstrauss – mathematician Johnson–Lindenstrauss lemma
- Elon Lindenstrauss – mathematician
- Michel Loève – probabilist
- Joel Moses – MIT provost and writer of Macsyma
- Yoram Moses – computer scientist, winner of the Gödel Prize (1997)
- Judea Pearl – artificial intelligence, philosophy of action; Turing Award (2011)
- Ilya Piatetski-Shapiro – representation theory; Wolf Prize in Mathematics (1990)
- Amir Pnueli – temporal logic; Turing Award (1996)
- Michael O. Rabin – nondeterminism, primality testing; Turing Award (1976)
- Shmuel Safra – computer scientist, winner of the Gödel Prize (2001)
- Nir Shavit – computer scientist, winner of the Gödel Prize (2004)
- Adi Shamir – RSA encryption, differential cryptanalysis; Turing Award (2002)
- Saharon Shelah – logic; Wolf Prize in Mathematics (2001)
- Ehud Shapiro – Concurrent Prolog, DNA computing pioneer
- Moshe Y. Vardi – computer scientist, winner of the Gödel Prize (2000)
- Avi Wigderson – randomized algorithms; Nevanlinna Prize (1994)
- Doron Zeilberger – combinatorics

=== Journalists ===
- Suleiman Maswadeh
- Ilana Dayan
- Ehud Yaari
- Dan Margalit
- Ze'ev Schiff
- Ayala Hasson
- Amit Segal
- Yonit Levi
- Yaakov Bardugo

=== Engineering ===
- Yaakov Bar-Shalom (born 1941) – electrical engineer
- David Faiman (born 1944) – solar engineer and director of the National Solar Energy Center
- Yoram Koren (born 1938)– mechanical engineer
- Liviu Librescu (1930–2007) – Professor of Engineering Science and Mechanics at Virginia Tech, killed in the Virginia Tech massacre
- Hagit Messer Yaron (born 1953) – electrical engineer
- Moshe Zakai (1926–2015) – electrical engineer
- Jacob Ziv (1931–2023) – electrical engineer

=== Humanities ===
- Aharon Dolgopolsky – linguist: Nostratic
- Moshe Goshen-Gottstein – Biblical scholar
- Elias Khoury – law
- Nina Pinto-Abecasis – linguist and folklorist
- Hans Jakob Polotsky – linguist
- Chaim Rabin – Biblical scholar
- Alice Shalvi – English literature, educator
- Gershon Shaked – Hebrew literature
- Shemaryahu Talmon – Biblical scholar
- Emanuel Tov – Biblical scholar
- Ghil'ad Zuckermann – linguist, revivalist

=== Philosophy ===
- Martin Buber (1878–1965)
- Yeshayahu Leibowitz (1903–1994)
- Avishai Margalit (born 1939)
- Joseph Raz (1939–2022)
- Gershom Scholem (1897–1982)

=== Physics and chemistry ===
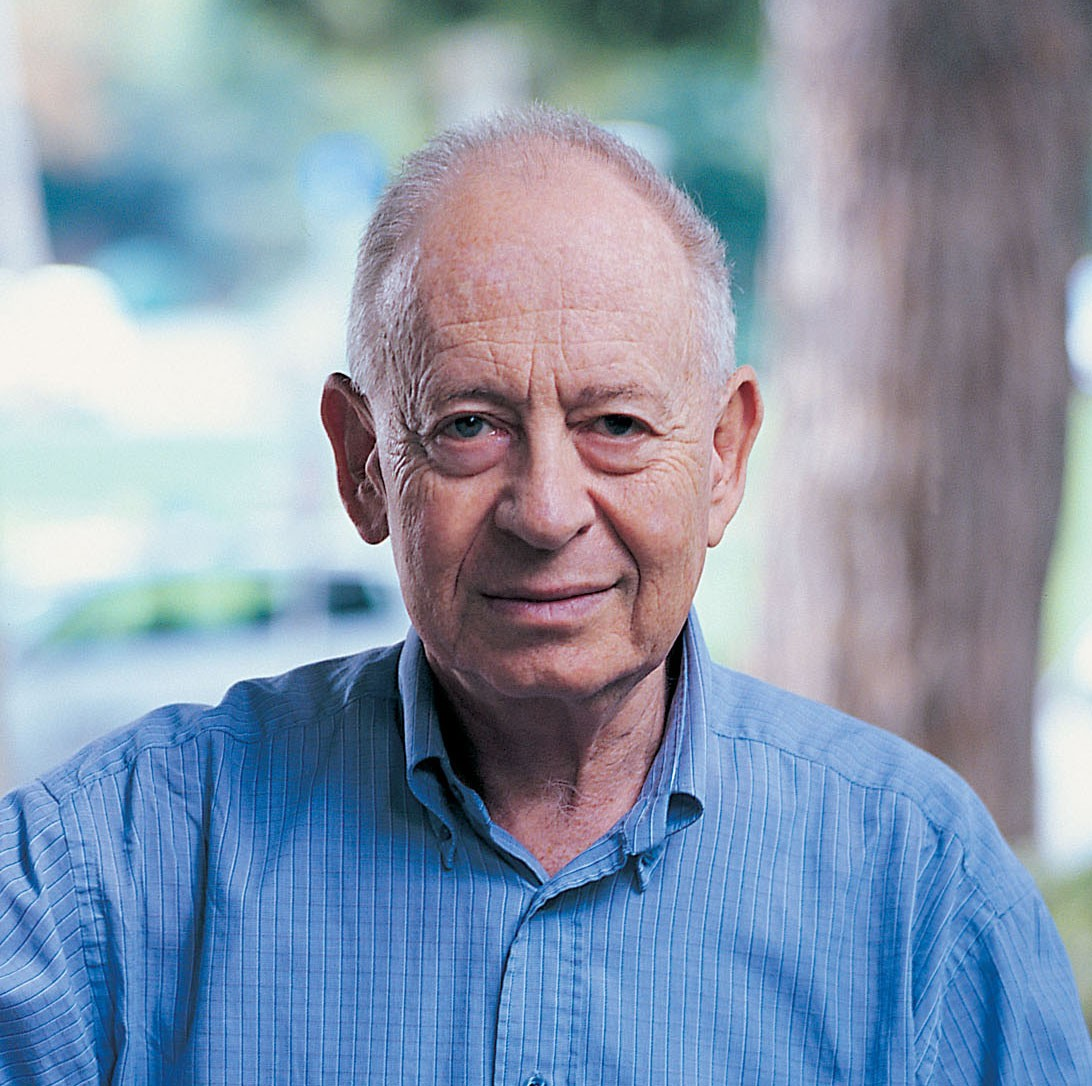
Josef Imry

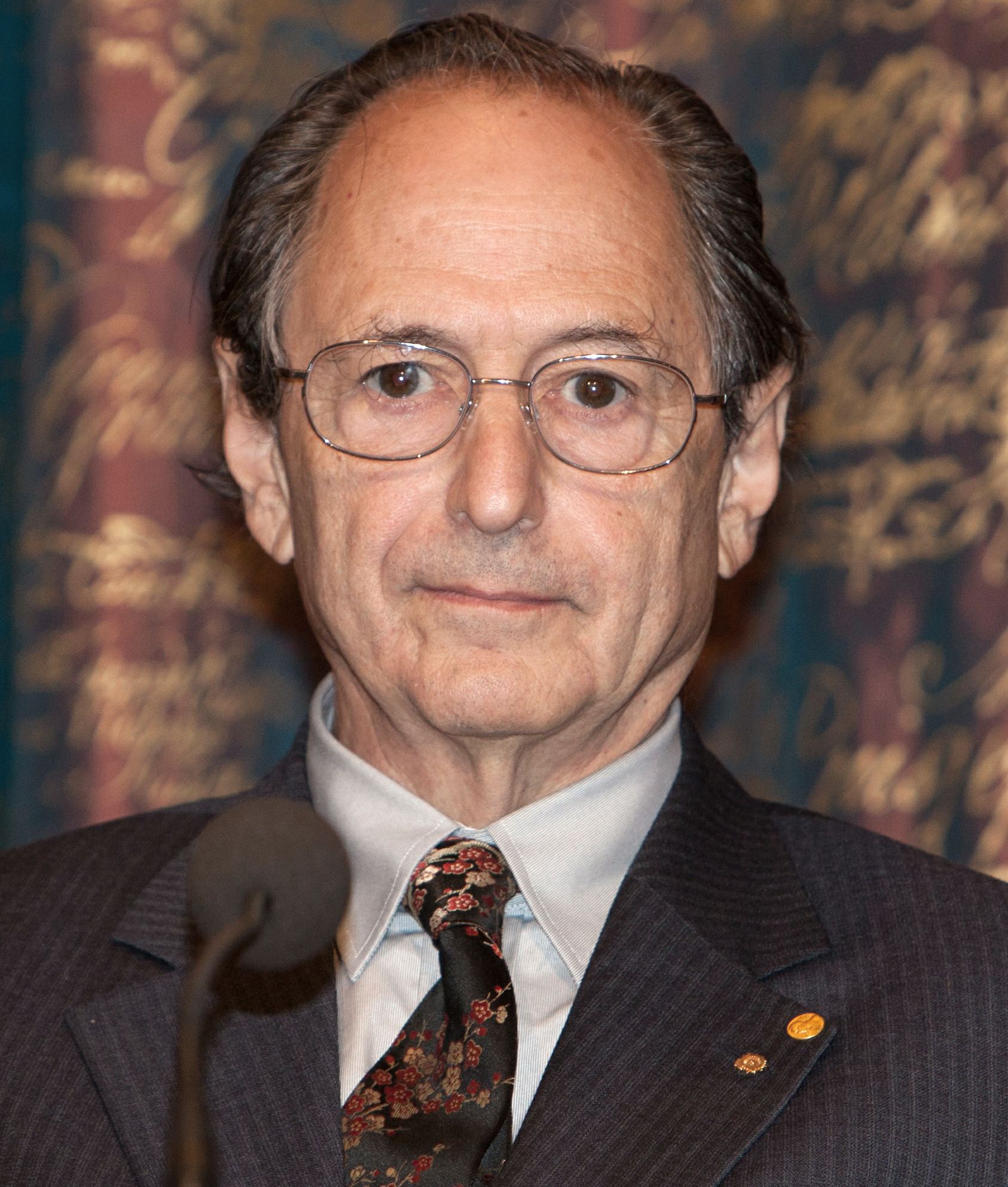
Nobel Prize winner Michael Levitt

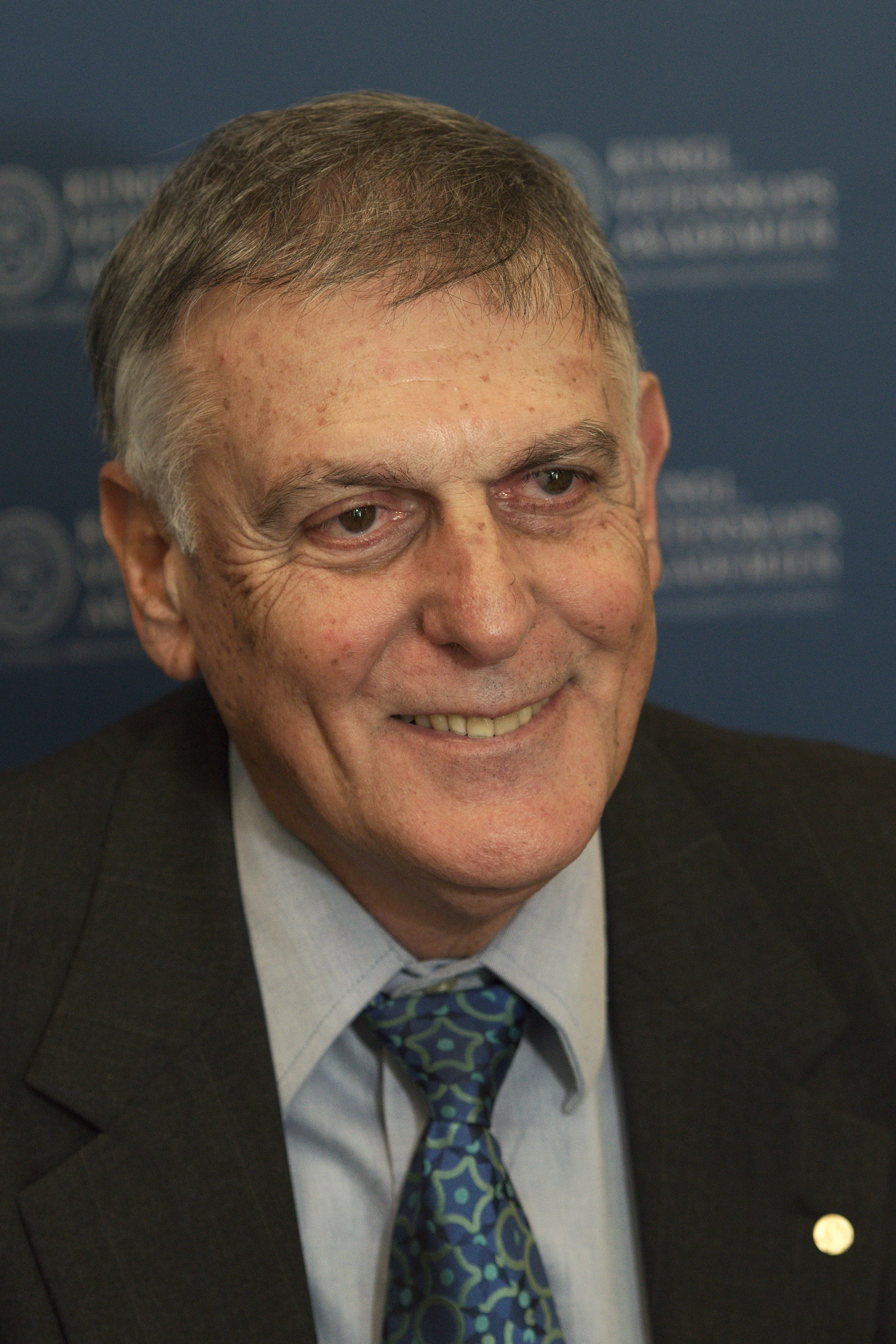
Nobel Prize winner Dan Shechtman

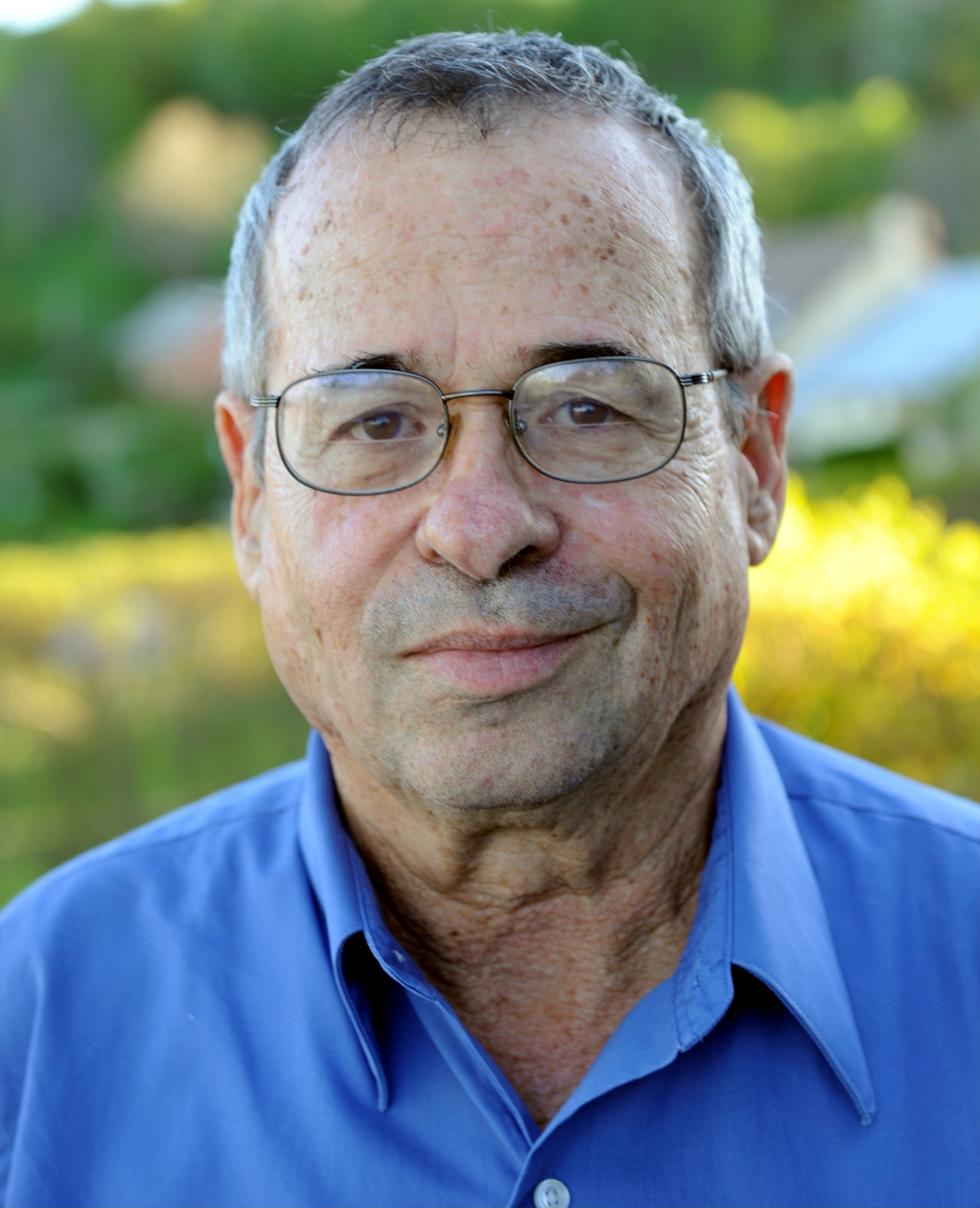
Nobel Prize winner Arieh Warshel

- Yakir Aharonov – Aharonov–Bohm effect; Wolf Prize in Physics (1998)
- Uri Banin – chemist
- Amiram Barkai – biochemist
- Jacob Bekenstein – black hole thermodynamics; Wolf Prize in Physics (2012)
- David Deutsch – quantum computing pioneer; Paul Dirac Prize (1998)
- Joshua Jortner and Rafi Levine – molecular energy; Wolf Prize in Chemistry (1988)
- Josef Imry – physicist
- Aaron Katzir – physical chemistry
- Ephraim Katzir – immobilized enzymes; Japan Prize (1985); fourth president of Israel List of presidents of Israel
- Michael Levitt – Nobel Prize in Chemistry (2011)
- Zvi Lipkin – physicist
- Dan T. Major – professor of chemistry
- Boris Mavashev – seismologist
- Mordehai Milgrom – Modified Newtonian Dynamics (MOND)
- Yuval Ne'eman – the "Eightfold way"
- Asher Peres – quantum theory
- Giulio Racah – spectroscopy
- Nathan Rosen – EPR paradox
- Nathan Seiberg – string theory
- Dan Shechtman – quasicrystals; Wolf Prize in Physics (1999), Nobel Prize in Chemistry (2013)
- Igal Talmi – nuclear physics
- Tsippy Tamiri – chemistry
- Reshef Tenne – discovered inorganic fullerenes and non-carbon nanotubes
- Arieh Warshel – Nobel Prize in Chemistry (2013)
- Chaim Weizmann – acetone production

=== Social sciences ===
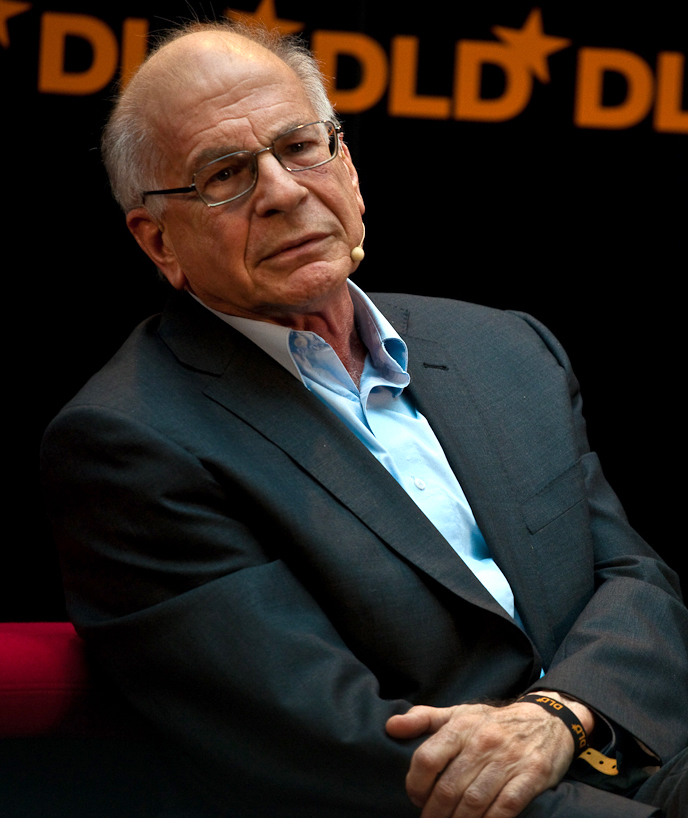
Nobel Prize winner Daniel Kahneman

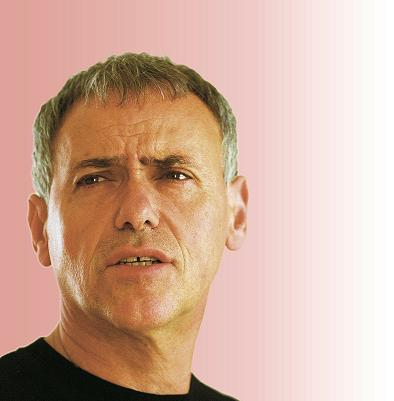
Ariel Rubinstein

- Yehuda Bauer – Holocaust historian
- Daniel Elazar – political scientist
- Esther Farbstein – historian
- Ayelet Frish – strategic consultant
- Haim Ginott – psychologist: child psychology
- Eliyahu Goldratt – business consultant: theory of constraints
- Louis Guttman – sociologist
- Yuval Noah Harari – historian and author who wrote best selling book Sapiens: A Brief History of Humankind
- Michael Harris – public policy scholar and university administrator
- Elhanan Helpman – economist: international trade
- Daniel Kahneman – behavioural scientist: prospect theory; Nobel Memorial Prize in Economic Sciences (2002)
- Smadar Lavie – anthropologist
- Benny Morris – historian
- Erich Neumann – analytical psychologist: development, consciousness
- Nurit Peled-Elhanan – educator
- Renee Rabinowitz – psychologist and lawyer
- Sheizaf Rafaeli – management, information, communication
- Anat Rafaeli – organisational behaviour
- Ariel Rubinstein – economist
- Moshe Sharon – historian
- Avi Shlaim – historian
- Abraham Solomonick – semiotician, linguist
- Amos Tversky – behavioral scientist: prospect theory with Daniel Kahneman
- Hanan Yoran – historian

== Activists ==
- Uri Avnery – peace activist, Gush Shalom
- Yael Dayan – writer, politician, activist
- Esther Eillam – feminist activist
- Uzi Even – gay rights activist
- Yehuda Glick – activist for Jewish rights at the Temple Mount
- Shula Keshet – Mizrahi feminist, activist and artist
- Hagar Rublev (1954–2000) – peace activist
- Uri Savir – peace negotiator, Peres Center for Peace
- Israel Shahak – political activist
- Natan Sharansky – Soviet-era human rights activist
- Ronny Edry and Michal Tamir – originators of the Israel-Loves-Iran peace movement and its offshoots

== Architects ==
- Michael Arad
- Ram Karmi
- Richard Kauffmann
- David Kroyanker
- David Resnick
- Moshe Safdie
- Arieh Sharon

== Athletes ==
=== Association football (soccer) ===
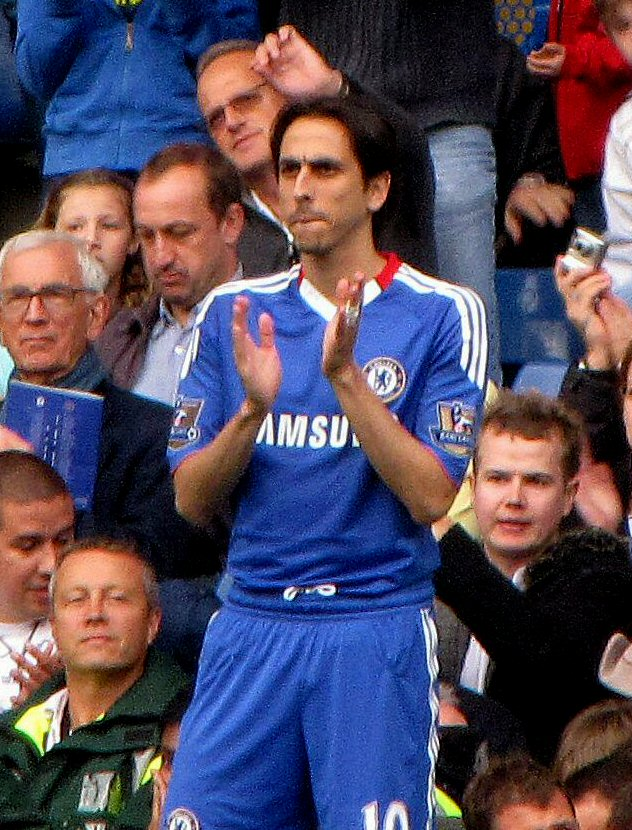
Yossi Benayoun

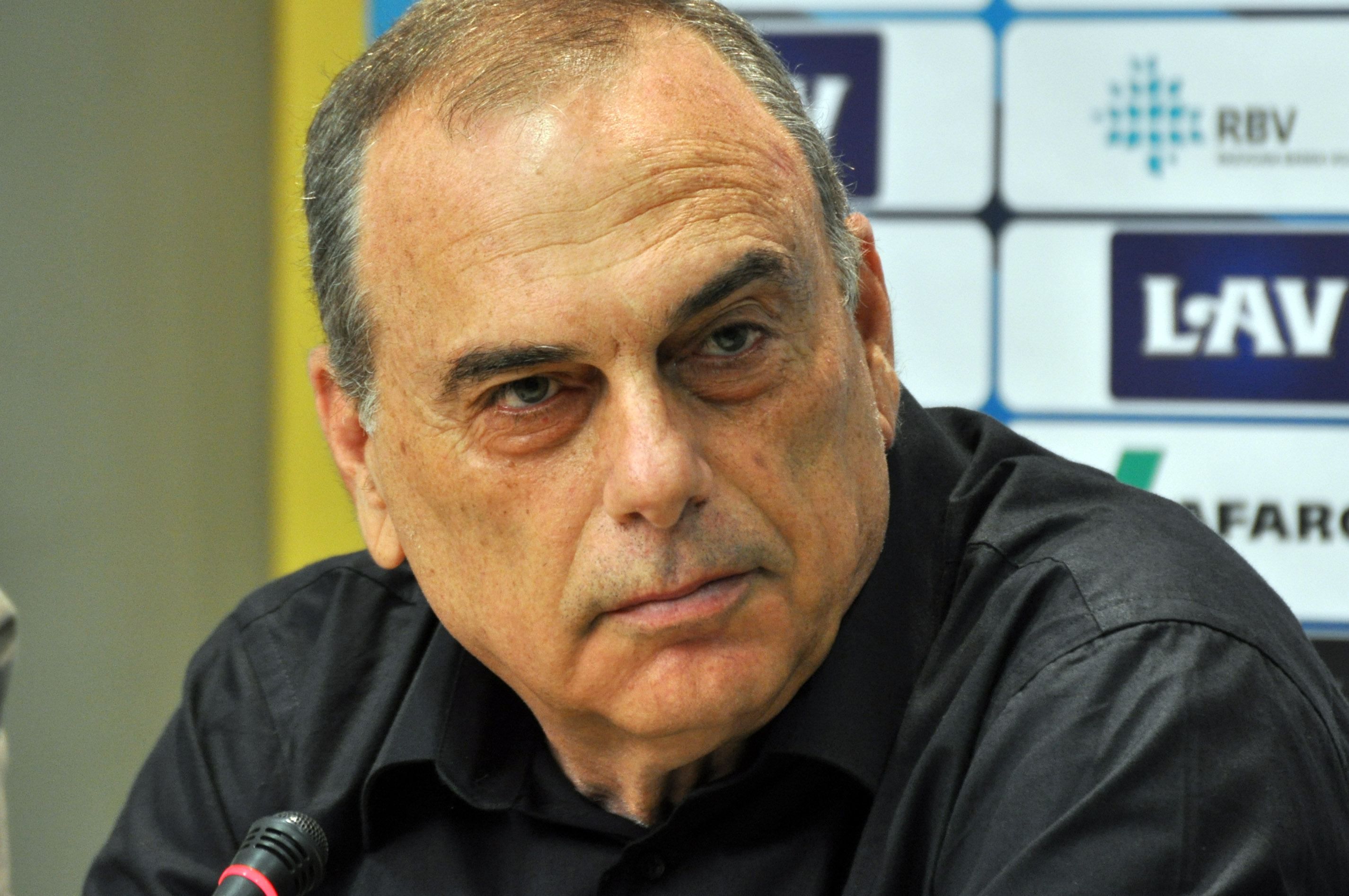
Avram Grant

- Avram Grant – Israeli head coach and manager (Chelsea F.C. and Israel national team)
- Eyal Ben Ami – midfielder various clubs, national team
- Yaniv Ben-Nissan – midfielder
- Dudu Aouate – goalkeeper (RCD Mallorca, national team)
- Jonathan Assous – defensive midfielder (Hapoel Petah Tikva), of French origin
- Gai Assulin – winger/attacking midfielder (Manchester City, national team)
- Ronen Badash – midfielder
- Pini Balili – striker (Bnei Yehuda Tel Aviv, Israel national team)
- Nir Bitton – midfielder, (Celtic, Maccabi Tel Aviv, SC Ashdod, Israel national team
- Yossi Benayoun – attacking midfielder, (Israel national team captain, as well as the national most capped footballer) Hapoel Be'er Sheva, Maccabi Haifa, Racing Santander, West Ham United, Liverpool, Chelsea
- Gil Cain – defender, Hapoel Azor
- David "Dedi" Ben Dayan – left defender (Hapoel Tel Aviv, national team)
- Tal Ben Haim – center back/right back, Maccabi Tel Aviv, Bolton Wanderers, Chelsea, West Ham United
- Daniel Brailovski – midfielder (Argentina, Uruguay, and Israel national teams)
- Roberto Colautti – Argentine born-striker
- Tomer Chencinski – goaltender (Vaasan Palloseura)
- Avi Cohen – defender, Liverpool and national team
- Tamir Cohen – midfielder (Bolton Wanderers and national team)
- Mu'nas Dabbur – Israeli-arab professional footballer
- Yigal Frid – FIFA-listed referee
- Rami Gershon – centre back / left back
- Tvrtko Kale – Croatia/Israel, goalkeeper (Hapoel Haifa)
- Oscar Gloukh - Attacking Midfielder / Winger for Ajax
- Yaniv Katan – forward/winger (Maccabi Haifa, national team)
- Abraham Klein – FIFA-listed referee
- Eli Ohana – won UEFA Cup Winners' Cup and Bravo Award (most outstanding young player in Europe); national team; manager
- Haim Revivo – attacking/side midfielder (Israel national team), Maccabi Haifa, Celta de Vigo, Fenerbahçe, Galatasaray
- Ronnie Rosenthal – left winger/striker (Israel national team), Maccabi Haifa, Liverpool, Tottenham, Watford
- Ben Sahar – striker/winger (Hapoel Tel Aviv, national team)
- Mordechai Spiegler – striker (Israel national team), manager
- Idan Tal – midfielder (Beitar Jerusalem FC and Israel national team)
- Salim Tuama – soccer player playing for Hapoel Tel Aviv who has in the past played for Standard Liège, Maccabi Petah Tikva, Kayserispor, AEL and the youth club Gadna Tel Aviv Yehuda.
- Rifaat Turk – Team Israel Olympic midfielder
- Yochanan Vollach – defender (Israel national team); current president of Maccabi Haifa
- Pini Zahavi – UK-based super-agent
- Itzik Zohar – attacking midfielder (Israel national team), Maccabi Jaffa, Maccabi Tel Aviv, Royal Antwerp, Beitar Jerusalem, Crystal Palace, Maccabi Haifa, Maccabi Herzliya, Maccabi Netanya, F.C. Ashdod, Hapoel Nazareth Illit
- Eyal Berkovic – attacking midfielder (English Premier League clubs and Celtic F.C and Israel national team)
- Eran Zahavi – forward (PSV Eindhoven and Israel national team captain, as well as the national top goalscorer)
- Manor Solomon – winger/attacking midfielder (Tottenham Hotspur F.C., Leeds United AFC and Israel national team)

=== Basketball ===
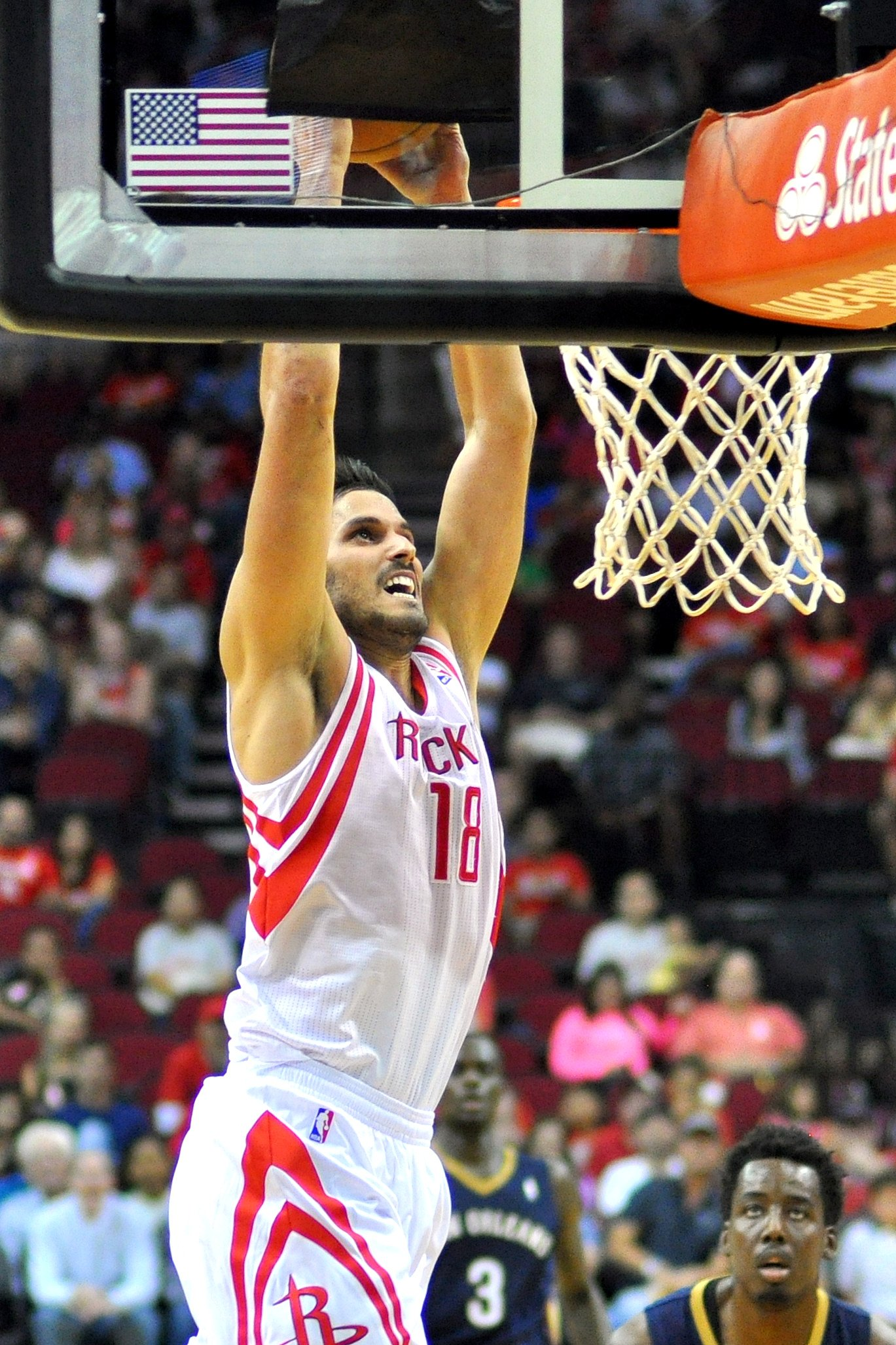
Omri Casspi

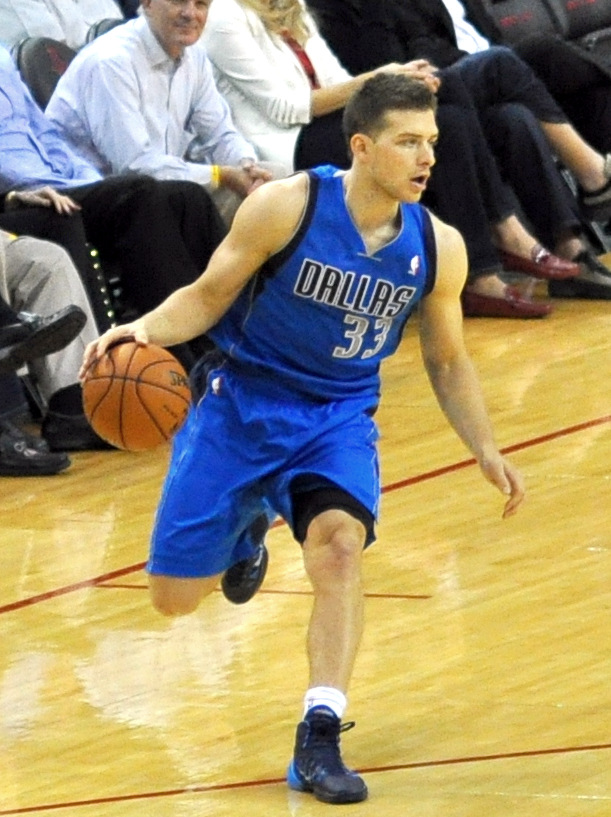
Gal Mekel

- Miki Berkovich – Maccabi Tel Aviv
- David Blu – (formerly "Bluthenthal"), EuroLeague 6' 7" forward (Maccabi Tel Aviv)
- Tal Brody – Euroleague 6' 2" shooting guard, Maccabi Tel Aviv
- Tal Burstein – Maccabi Tel Aviv
- Omri Casspi – 6' 9" small forward, drafted in 1st round of 2009 NBA draft (Golden State Warriors)
- Tanhum Cohen-Mintz – 6' 8" center; 2× Euroleague All-Star
- Shay Doron – WNBA 5' 9" guard, University of Maryland (New York Liberty)
- Lior Eliyahu – 6' 9" power forward, NBA draft 2006 (Orlando Magic; traded to Houston Rockets), but completed mandatory service in the Israel Defense Forces and played in the Euroleague (Maccabi Tel Aviv)
- Emanuel Sharp (born 2004), Israeli-American basketball player
- Tamir Goodman – US and Israel, 6' 3" shooting guard
- Yotam Halperin – 6' 5" guard, drafted in 2006 NBA draft by Seattle SuperSonics (Olympiacos)
- T. J. Leaf – NBA basketball player
- Barry Leibowitz (born 1945) – American-Israeli basketball player in the American Basketball Association and the Israeli Basketball Premier League
- Gal Mekel – NBA basketball player
- Yehoshua Rozin – basketball coach
- Ben Saraf (born 2006), basketball player
- Derrick Sharp – American-Israeli basketball player
- Amit Tamir – 6' 10" center/forward, University of California, PAOK Thessaloniki (Hapoel Jerusalem)

=== Bodybuilding ===
- Alana Shipp – American/Israeli IFBB professional bodybuilder

=== Boxing ===
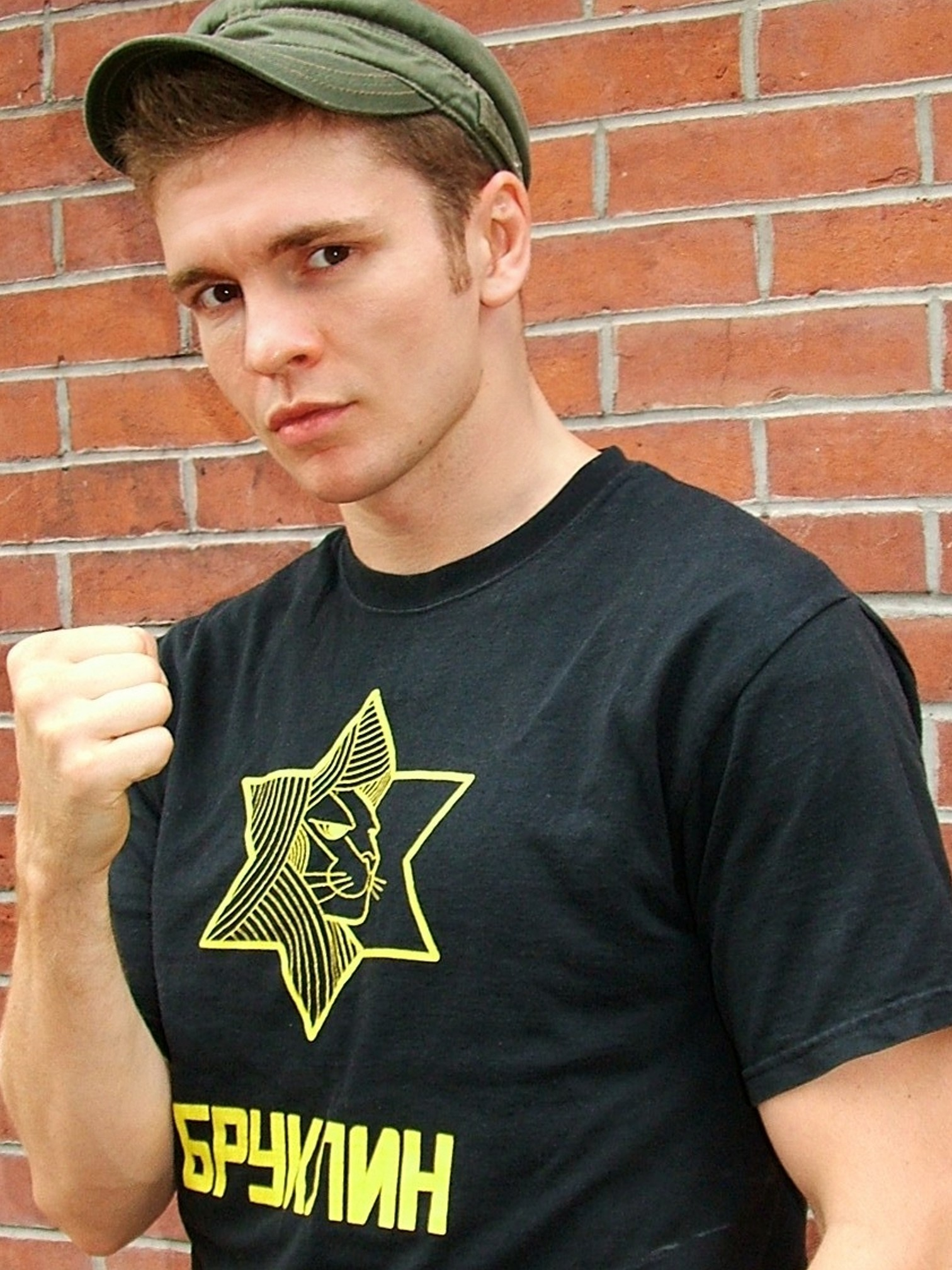
Yuri Foreman

- Salamo Arouch (The Ballet Dancer) – middleweight champion of Greece, lightweight, welterweight, middleweight. He survived the Holocaust by boxing (over 200 bouts) for the entertainment of Nazi officers in Auschwitz Concentration Camp. His story was portrayed in the 1989 film "Triumph of the Spirit"
- Hagar Finer – WIBF bantamweight champion
- Yuri Foreman – US middleweight and World Boxing Association super welterweight champion
- Roman Greenberg – ("The Lion from Zion"), International Boxing Organization's Intercontinental heavyweight champion
- Pavlo Ishchenko – two-time European Amateur Boxing Championships medalist, and European Games medalist
- Yulia Sachkov – world champion kickboxer

=== Cycling ===
- Mikhail Iakovlev (born 2000) – Olympic cyclist

=== Fencing ===
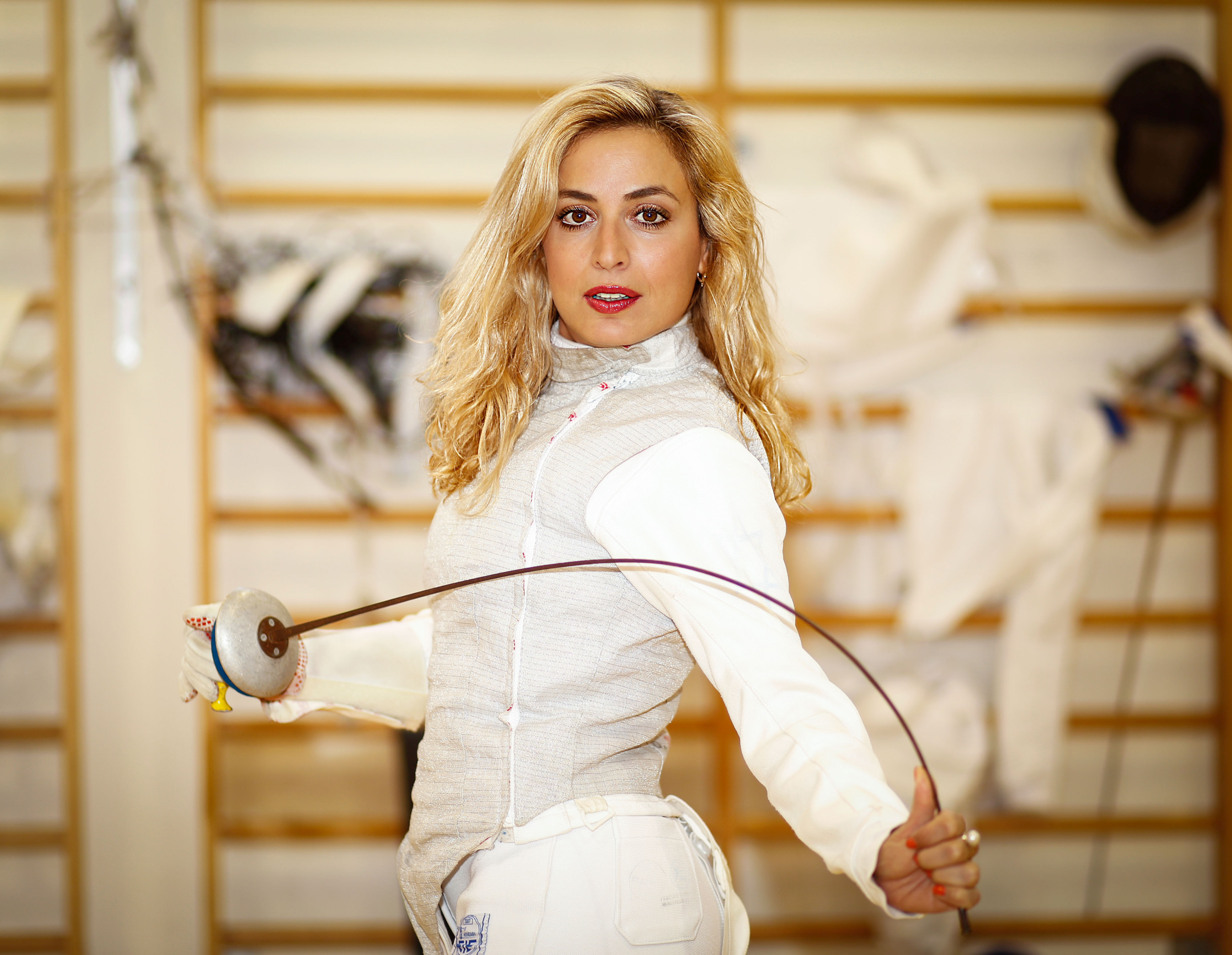
Delila Hatuel

- Boaz Ellis (born 1981) – foil, 5-time Israeli champion
- Yuval Freilich (born 1995) – épée, 2019 European Épée Champion
- Lydia Hatoel-Zuckerman (born 1963) – foil, 6-time Israeli champion
- Delila Hatuel (born 1980) – Olympic foil fencer
- Noam Mills (born 1986) – épée, junior female world champion, four-time Israeli champion
- Ayelet Ohayon (born 1974) – foil, European champion
- Tomer Or (born 1978) – foil, junior world champion
- Andre Spitzer (1945–1972) – one of 11 athletes and coaches taken hostage and subsequently killed by terrorists in the Munich massacre

=== Figure skating ===
- Alexei Beletski – ice dancer, Olympian
- Oleksii Bychenko – figure skater, Olympian, European silver medallist 2016
- Galit Chait – ice dancer, World Championship bronze 2002
- Natalia Gudina – figure skater, Olympian
- Tamar Katz – figure skater
- Lionel Rumi – ice dancer
- Sergei Sakhnovsky – ice dancer, World Championship Bronze medal 2002
- Daniel Samohin – figure skater, Olympian, 2016 World Junior Champion
- Michael Shmerkin – figure skater
- Alexandra Zaretski – ice dancer, Olympian
- Roman Zaretski – ice dancer, Olympian

=== Golf ===
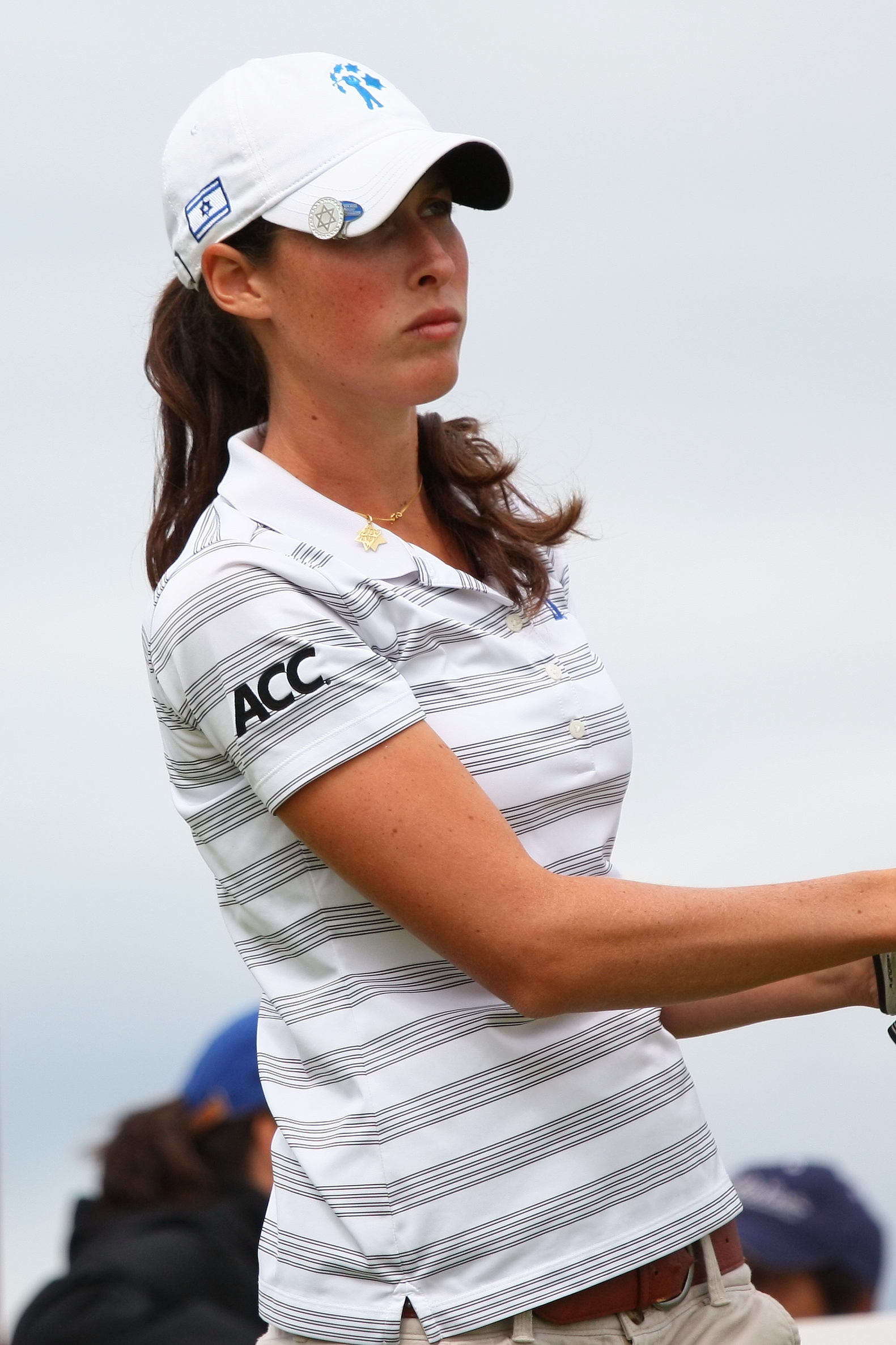
Laetitia Beck

- Laetitia Beck – golfer

=== Gymnastics ===
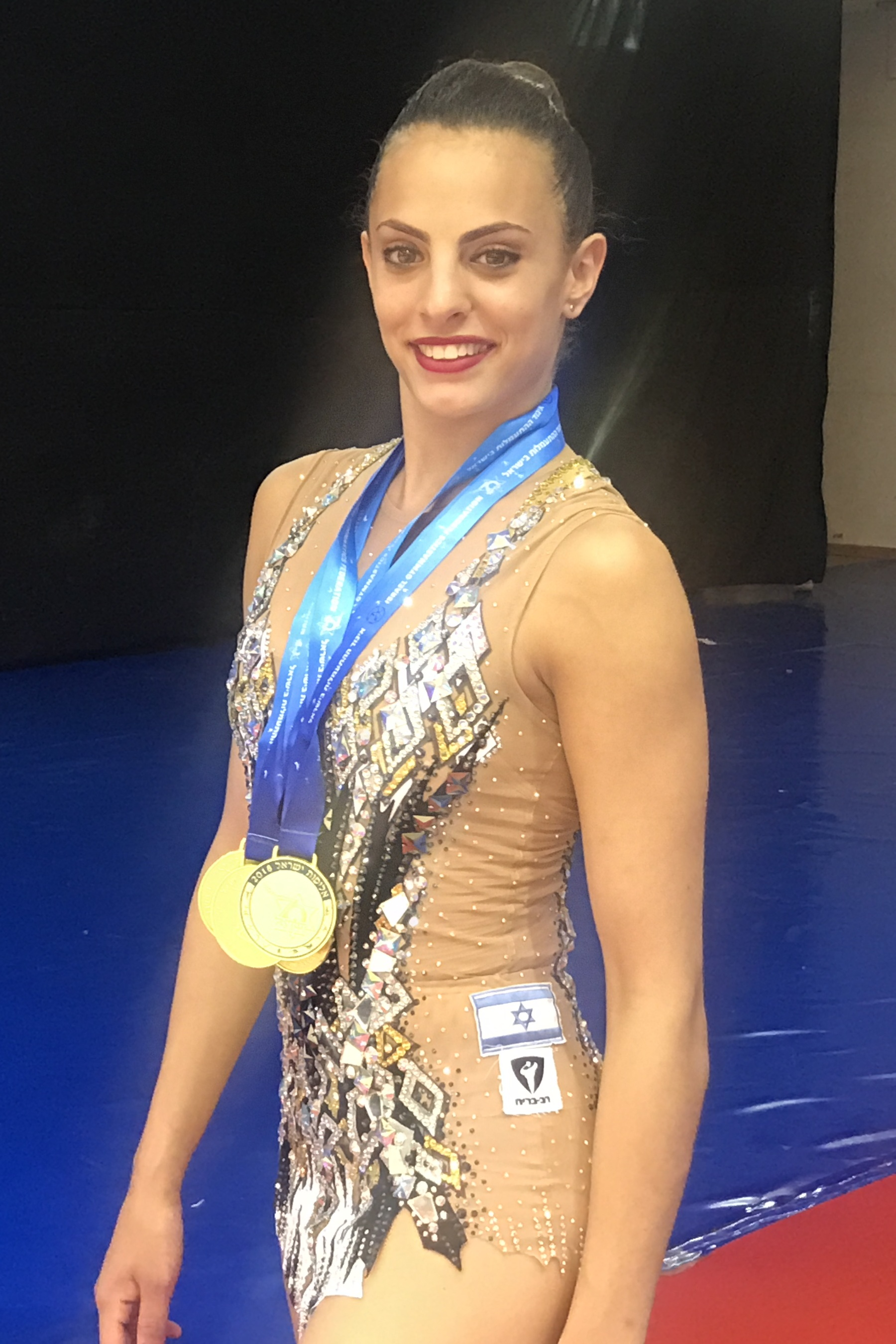
Linoy Ashram

- Alexander Shatilov – World bronze (artistic gymnast; floor exercise)
- Artem Dolgopyat – artistic gymnast (Olympic gold: 2020)
- Linoy Ashram – rhythmic gymnast (Olympic gold: 2020)
- Neta Rivkin – rhythmic gymnast
- Nicol Zelikman – rhythmic gymnast

=== Judo ===
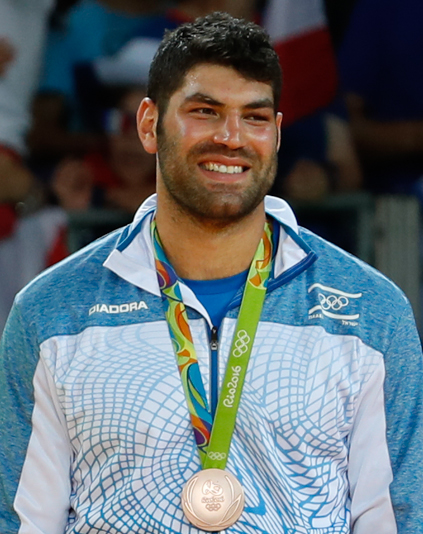
Or Sasson

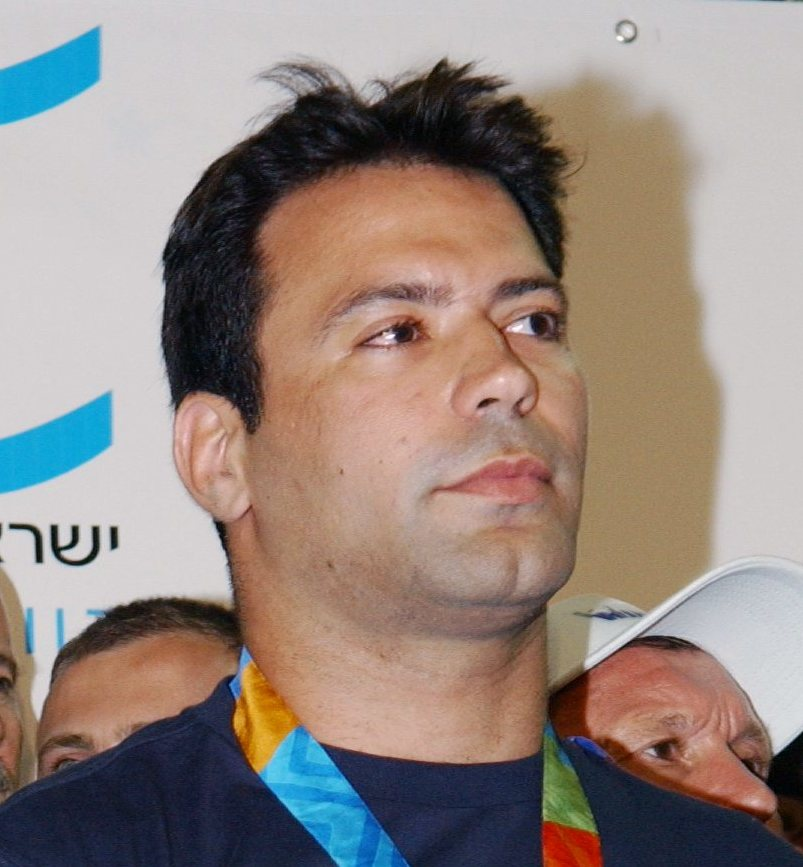
Ariel Ze'evi

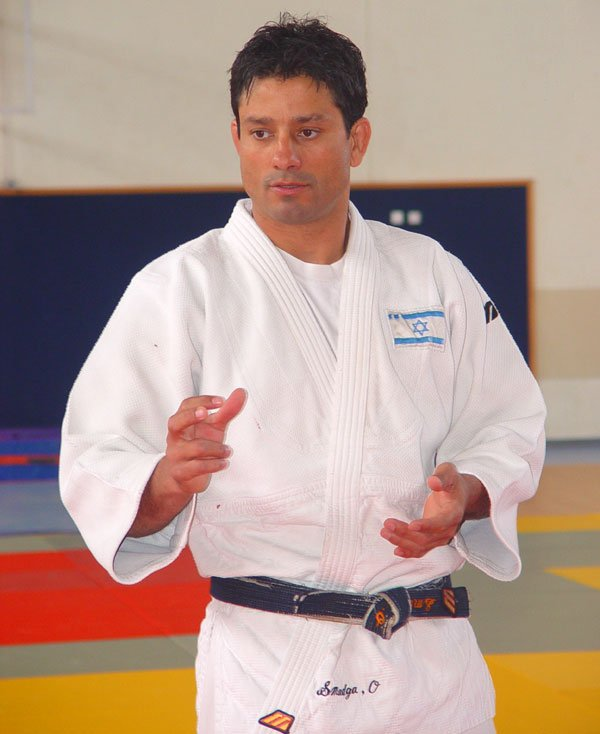
Oren Smadja

- Yael Arad – judoka (Olympic silver: 1992, European champion: 1993, world silver: 1993). first Israeli Olympic medalist; light-middleweight
- Yarden Gerbi – judoka (Olympic bronze: 2016)
- Andrian Kordon – European Championship bronze; heavyweight
- Daniela Krukower – Israeli/Argentine judoka, World Champion (under 63 kg)
- Timna Nelson-Levy (born 1994) – judoka (Olympic bronze: 2020), European champion
- Yoel Razvozov – two-time European Championship silver; lightweight
- Or Sasson – judoka (Olympic bronze: 2016)
- Oren Smadja – judoka (Olympic bronze: 1992; lightweight)
- Ehud Vaks – judoka (half-lightweight)
- Gal Yekutiel – European championship bronze
- Ariel Ze'evi – judoka (European champion: 2000, 2003, 2004; Olympic bronze: 2004; 100 kg)

=== Motor racing ===
- Alon Day – former NASCAR Euro Series racing driver
- Chanoch Nissany – former racing driver and Formula One test driver
- Roy Nissany – FIA Formula 2 racing driver
- Ido Cohen – FIA Formula 3 racing driver
- Alon Gabbay – Porsche Carrera Cup Germany racing driver

=== Sailing ===
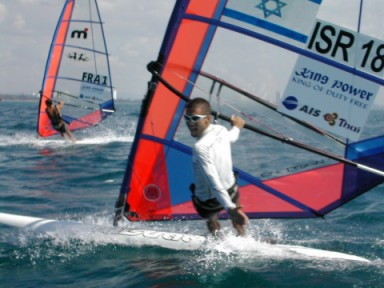
Gal Fridman

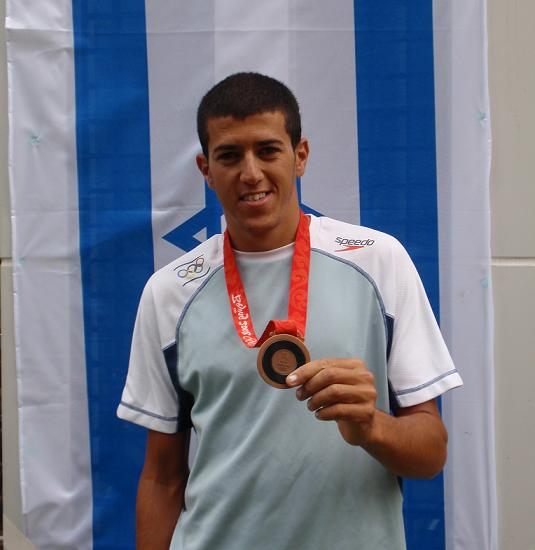
Shahar Tzuberi

- Zefania Carmel – yachtsman, world champion (420 class)
- Gal Fridman – windsurfer (Olympic gold: 2004 (Israel's first gold medalist), bronze: 1996 (Mistral class); world champion: 2002)
- Shai Kakon (born 2002) – Olympic sailor
- Sharon Kantor (born 2003) – world champion windsurfer
- Lee Korzits – windsurfer (two-time Olympian and four-time world champion).
- Lydia Lazarov – yachting world champion (420 class)
- Nimrod Mashiah – windsurfer; World Championship silver, ranked # 1 in world
- Tom Reuveny (born 2000) – Olympic champion windsurfing sailor
- Katy Spychakov – windsurfer; World Championship silver
- Shahar Tzuberi – windsurfer, Olympic bronze (RS:X discipline); 2009 and 2010 European Windsurf champion

=== Surfing ===
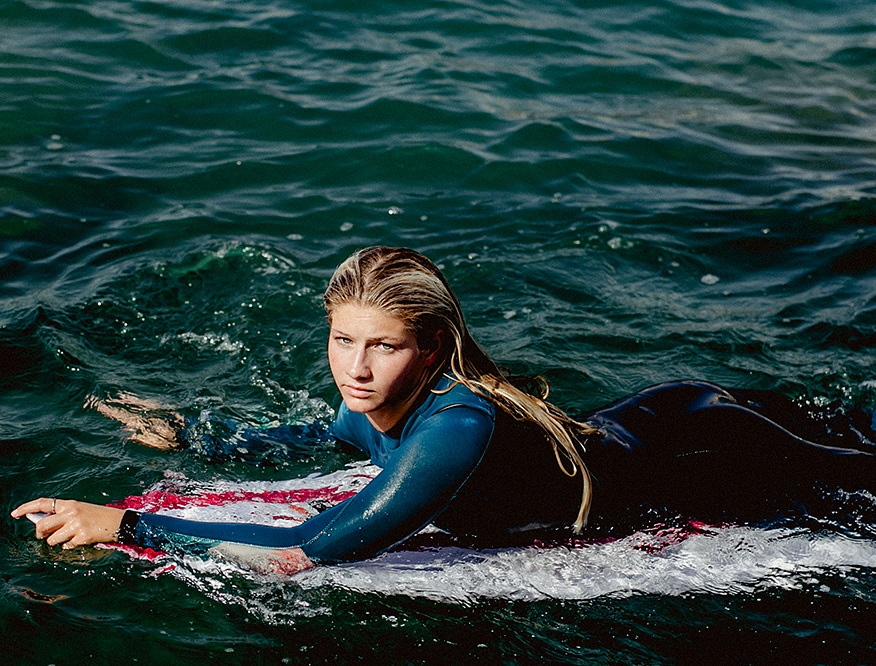
Anat Lelior

- Anat Lelior – female surfer who competed for Israel at the 2020 Olympic Games

=== Swimming ===
- Vadim Alexeev – swimmer, breaststroke
- Adi Bichman – 400-m and 800-m freestyle, 400-m medley
- Yoav Bruck – 50-m freestyle and 100-m freestyle
- Anastasia Gorbenko (born 2003) – backstroke, breaststroke, and freestyle
- Eran Groumi – 100 and 200 m backstroke, 100-m butterfly
- Michael "Miki" Halika – 200-m butterfly, 200- and 400-m individual medley
- Judith Haspel – (born "Judith Deutsch"), of Austrian origin, held every Austrian women's middle and long-distance freestyle record in 1935; refused to represent Austria in 1936 Summer Olympics along with Ruth Langer and Lucie Goldner, protesting Hitler, stating, "We do not boycott Olympia, but Berlin".
- Marc Hinawi – record holder in the European Games
- Amit Ivry – Maccabiah and Israeli records in Women's 100 m butterfly, Israeli record in Women's 200 m Individual Medley, bronze medal in 100 m butterfly at the European Swimming Championships.
- Dan Kutler – of US origin; 100-m butterfly, 4×100-m medley relay
- Keren Leibovitch – Paralympic swimmer, 4× gold medal winner, 100m backstroke, 50m and 100m freestyle, 200m individual medley
- Tal Stricker – 100- and 200-m breaststroke, 4×100-m medley relay
- Eithan Urbach – backstroke swimmer, European championship silver and bronze; 100-m backstroke

=== Table tennis ===
- Marina Kravchenko – table tennis player, Soviet and Israel national teams
- Angelica Rozeanu – (Adelstin), of Romanian origin, 17-time world table tennis champion, ITTFHoF

=== Taekwondo ===
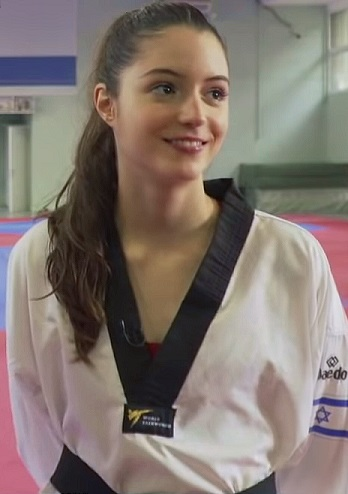
Avishag Semberg

- Avishag Semberg – taekwondo female athlete (Olympic bronze: 2020)

=== Tennis ===
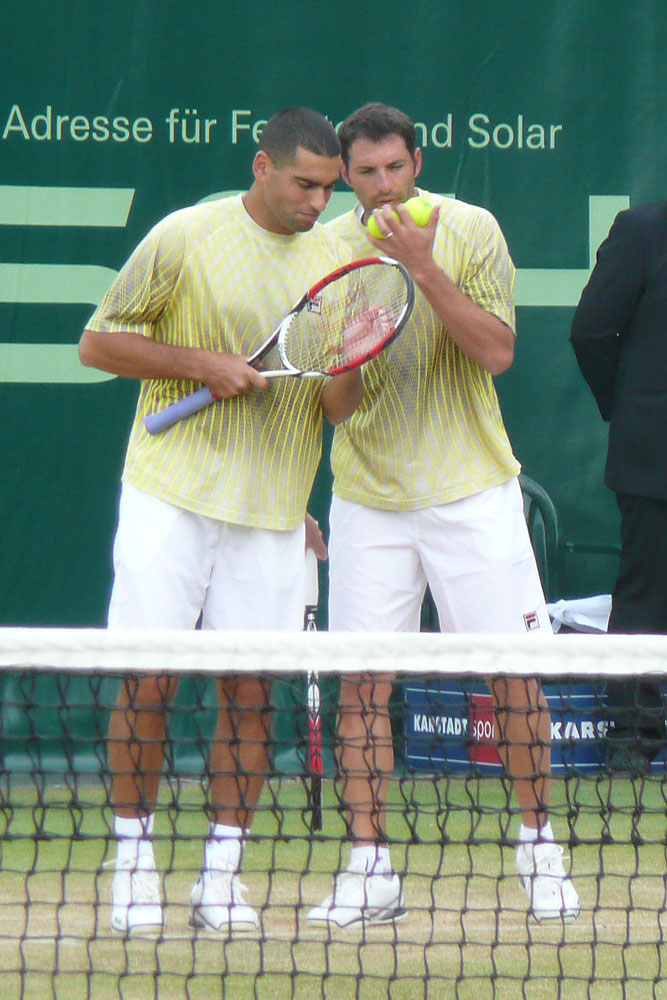
Andy Ram and Jonathan Erlich

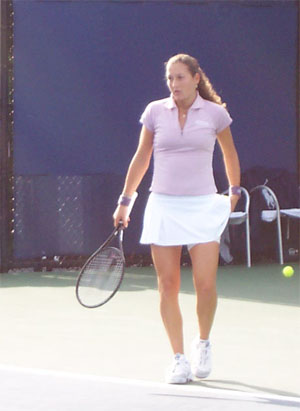
Shahar Pe'er

- Noam Behr
- Ilana Berger
- Gilad Bloom
- Jonathan Erlich – 6 doubles titles, 6 doubles finals; won 2008 Australian Open Men's Doubles (w/Andy Ram), highest world doubles ranking # 5
- Shlomo Glickstein – highest world singles ranking # 22, highest world doubles ranking # 28
- Julia Glushko
- Amir Hadad
- Harel Levy – highest world singles ranking # 30
- Evgenia Linetskaya
- Amos Mansdorf – highest world singles ranking # 18
- Tzipora Obziler
- Noam Okun
- Yshai Oliel
- Shahar Pe'er – (3 WTA career titles), highest world singles ranking # 11, highest world doubles ranking # 14
- Keren Shlomo – (3 ITF career titles)
- Shahar Perkiss
- Andy Ram – 6 doubles titles, 6 doubles finals, 1 mixed double title (won 2006 Wimbledon Mixed Doubles (w/Vera Zvonareva), 2007 French Open Mixed Doubles (w/Nathalie Dechy), 2008 Australian Open Men's Doubles (w/Jonathan Erlich), highest world doubles ranking # 5
- Eyal Ran
- Guy Sasson (born 1980), Paralympic wheelchair tennis player; multiple-time Grand Slam champion
- Dudi Sela – highest world singles ranking # 29
- Anna Smashnova – (12 WTA career titles), highest world singles ranking # 15

=== Track and field ===
- Alex Averbukh – pole vaulter (European champion: 2002, 2006)
- Ayele Seteng – long-distance runner, was the oldest track and field athlete competing at the 2004 Olympics and 2008 Olympics.
- Danielle Frenkel – high jump champion
- Hanna Knyazyeva-Minenko – triple jumper and long jumper; participated in 2012 Summer Olympics
- Shaul Ladany – world-record-holding racewalker, Bergen-Belsen survivor, Munich Massacre survivor, professor of industrial engineering
- Lonah Chemtai Salpeter – Kenyan-Israeli Olympic marathon runner
- Esther Roth-Shachamarov – track and field, hurdler and sprinter (5 Asian Game golds)

=== Other ===
- 1972 Olympic team – see Munich Massacre
- David Mark Berger – weightlifter originally from US, Maccabiah champion (middleweight); killed in the Munich Massacre
- Max Birbraer – ice hockey player drafted by NHL team (New Jersey Devils)
- Nili Block (born 1995) – world champion kickboxer and Muay Thai fighter
- Noam Dar – Israeli-born Scottish wrestler
- Oren Eizenman – ice hockey player, Israel national team; Connecticut Whale)
- Eli Elezra – professional poker player
- Boris Gelfand, Emil Sutovsky, Ilya Smirin – chess Grandmasters (~2700 peak Elo rating)
- Bar Greenzaid – indoor skydiving athlete, singer and model
- Baruch Hagai – wheelchair athlete (multiple paralympic golds)
- Michael Kolganov – sprint canoer/kayak paddler, world champion, Olympic bronze 2000 (K-1 500-meter)
- Dean Kremer (born 1996) – Israeli-American Major League Baseball pitcher
- Imi Lichtenfeld – Hungarian-born Israeli martial artist, developer of Krav Maga
- Ido Pariente – mixed martial artist
- Eliezer Sherbatov (born 1991) – Israeli-Canadian ice hockey player
- Shachar Sagiv (born 1994) – Olympic triathlete
- Chagai Zamir – four-time Paralympic Games champion
- Misha Zilberman (born 1989) – Olympic badminton player

== Chefs ==
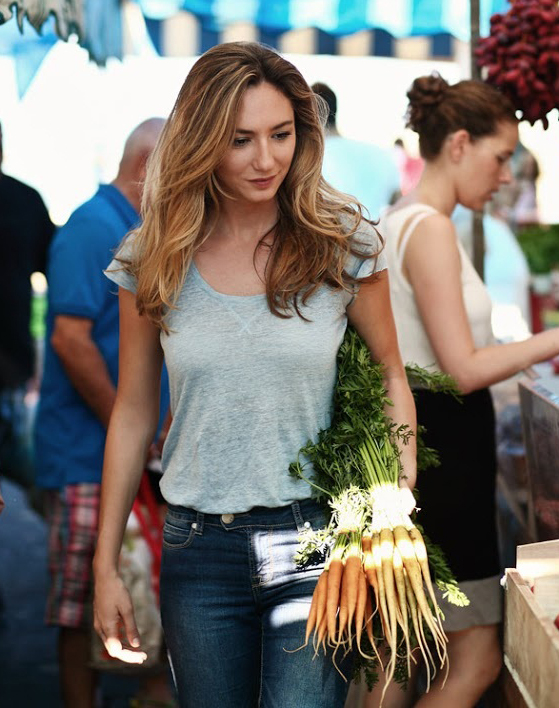
Michal Ansky

- Yisrael Aharoni – chef and restaurateur and reality television judge
- Michal Ansky – female chef and reality television judge
- Jamie Geller – American born-Israeli chef
- Erez Komarovsky – first artisanal bread baker in Israel and reality television judge
- Yotam Ottolenghi – Israeli-British chef
- Moshik Roth – chef with two Michelin stars and reality television judge
- Assaf Granit – chef with one Michelin star and reality television judge

== Entertainment ==
=== Artists ===
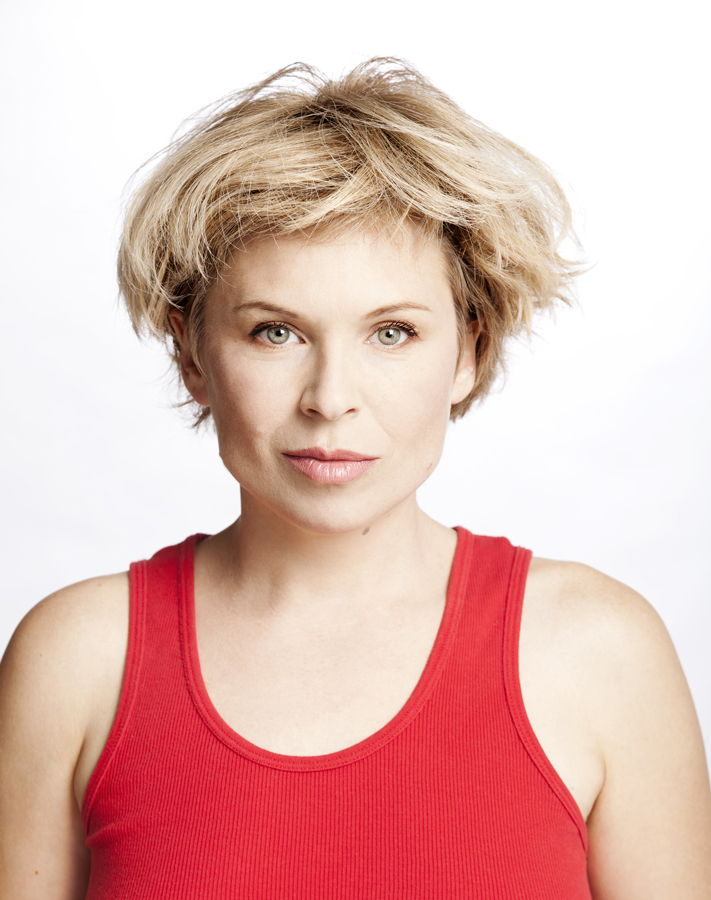
Sigalit Landau

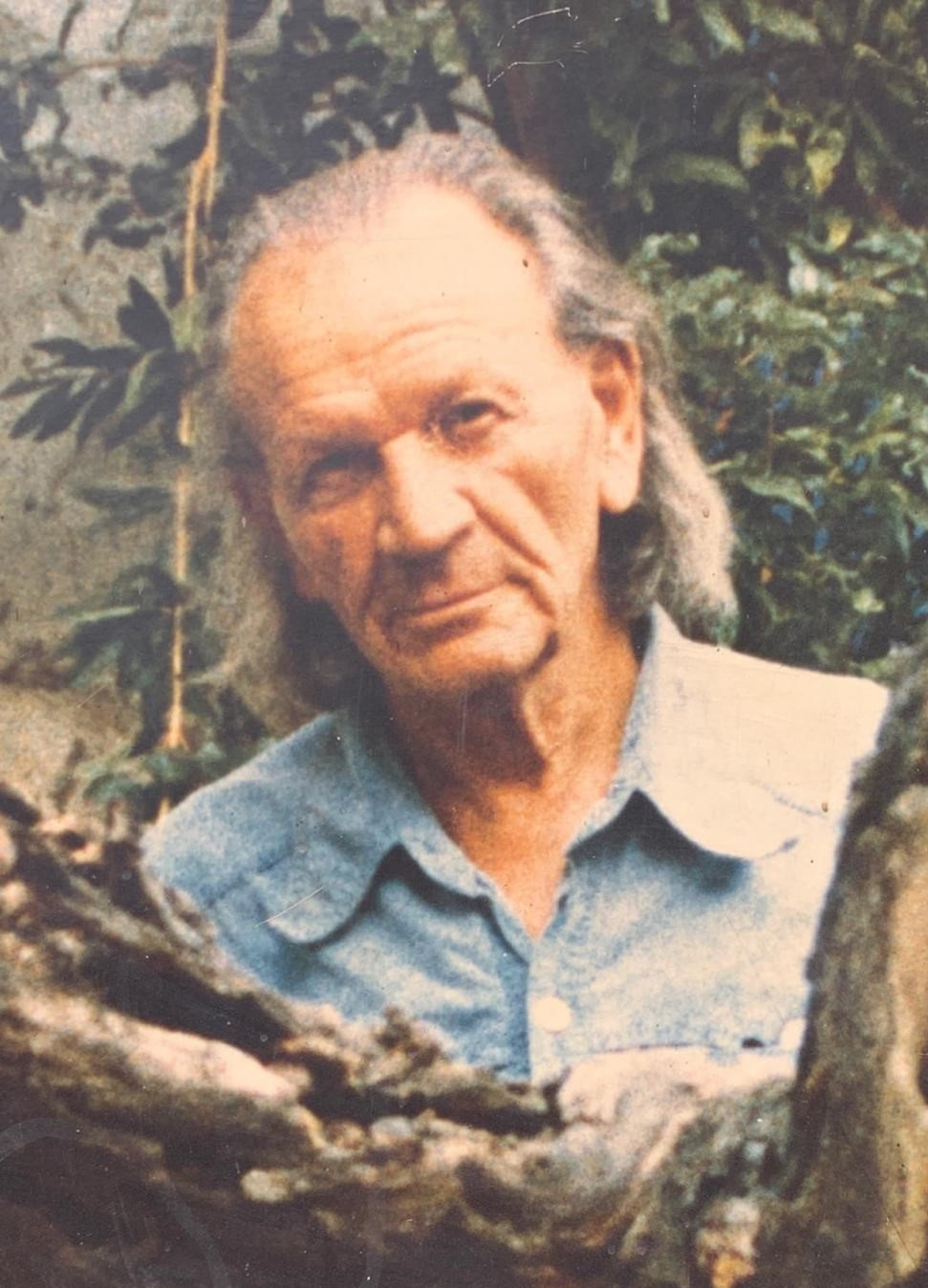
- Yitzhak Frenkel, École de Paris painter and sculptor
  Yaacov Agam – kinetic artist
- Ron Arad – designer
- Mordecai Ardon – painter
- David Ascalon – sculptor and synagogue designer
- Maurice Ascalon – sculptor and industrial designer
- Isidor Ascheim – painter and printmaker
- Mordechai Avniel – painter and sculptor
- Yigal Azrouel – fashion designer
- Ralph Bakshi – animation (director)
- Eyal ben-Moshe (Eyal B) – animator and director
- Tuvia Beeri – printmaker
- Alexander Bogen – painter
- Rhea Carmi – painter
- Yitzhak Danziger – sculptor
- Alber Elbaz – fashion designer
- Ohad Elimelech – artist, director, editor, photographer, animator, lecturer and graphic designer
- Osnat Elkabir – dancer, artist and theatre direction
- Sharon Eyal – dancer, choreographer
- Gadi Fraiman – sculptor
- Yitzhak Frenkel Frenel – École de Paris painter and sculptor
- Gideon Gechtman – sculptor
- Moshe Gershuni – painter
- Dudu Geva – artist and comic-strip illustrator
- Pinhas Golan – sculptor
- Nachum Gutman – painter
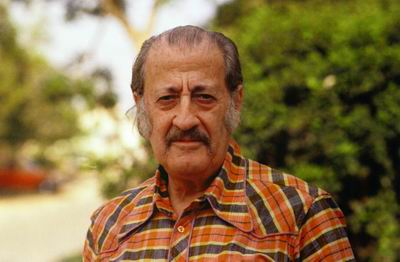
  Moshe Castel, volcanic ash artist
- Israel Hershberg – realist painter
- Shimshon Holzman – painter
- Leo Kahn – painter
- Shmuel Katz – illustrator
- Uri Katzenstein – visual artist
- Dani Karavan – sculptor
- Joseph Kossonogi – painter
- Elyasaf Kowner – video artist
- Sigalit Landau – video, installation, sculpture
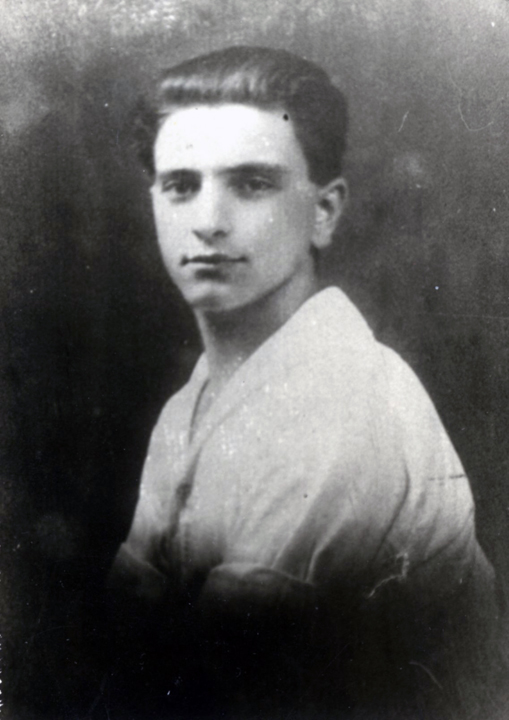
- Shimshon Holzman, water colourist
  Alex Levac – photographer
- Batia Lishansky – sculptor
- Ranan Lurie – political cartoonist
- Lea Nikel – painter
- Zvi Malnovitzer – painter
- Elyada Merioz – painter and art dealer
- Tamara Musakhanova – sculptor and ceramist
- Mushail Mushailov – painter
- Ilana Raviv – painter
- Leo Roth – painter
- Reuven Rubin – painter
- Mandy Sand – painter
- Hagit Shahal – painter
- David Tartakover – graphic designer
- Anna Ticho – painter
- Igael Tumarkin – sculptor
- Yemima Ergas Vroman – painter, sculptor, installation artist
- Sergey Zagraevsky – painter
- Moshe Ziffer – sculptor

=== Film, TV, radio, and stage ===
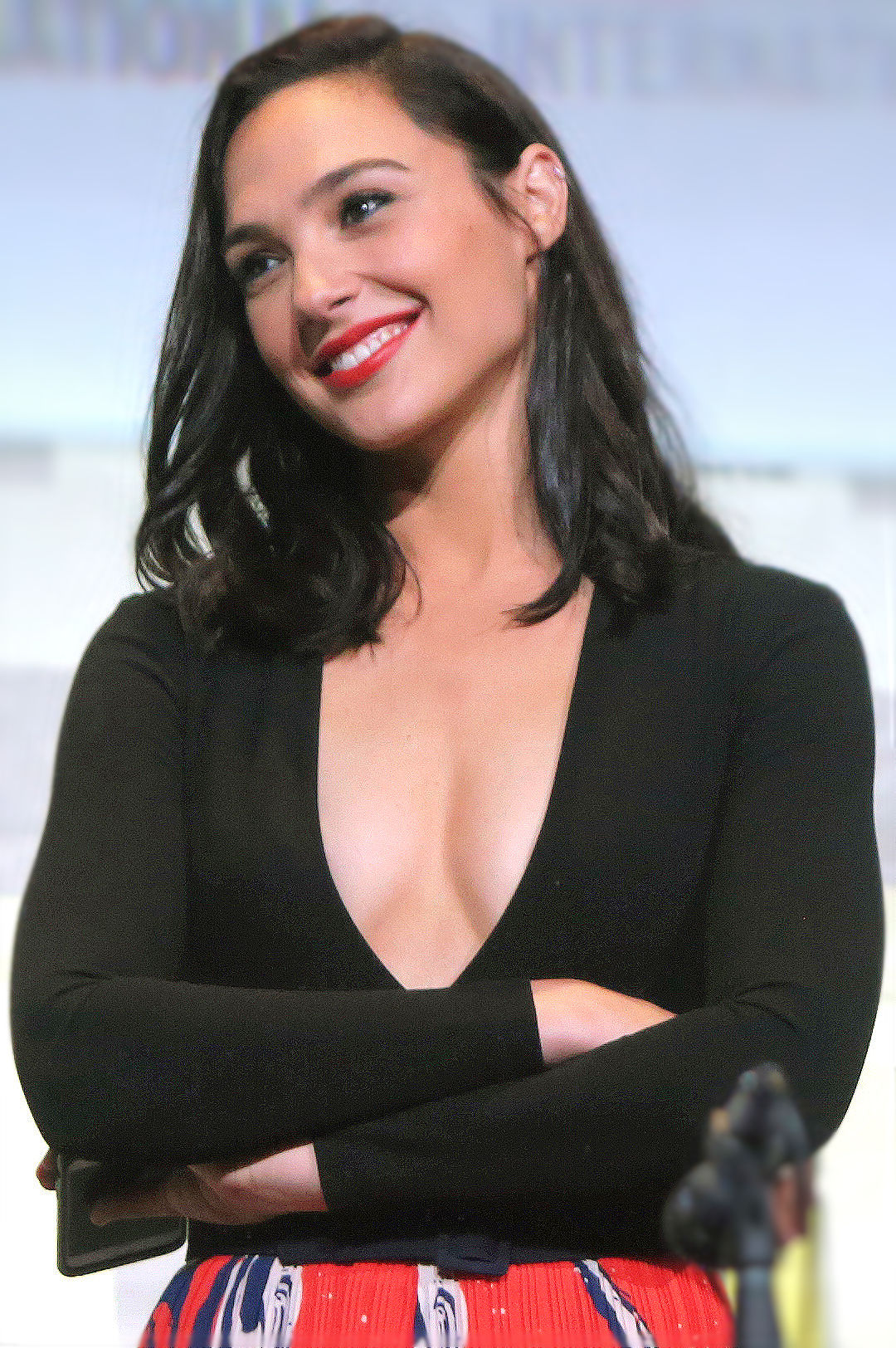
Gal Gadot

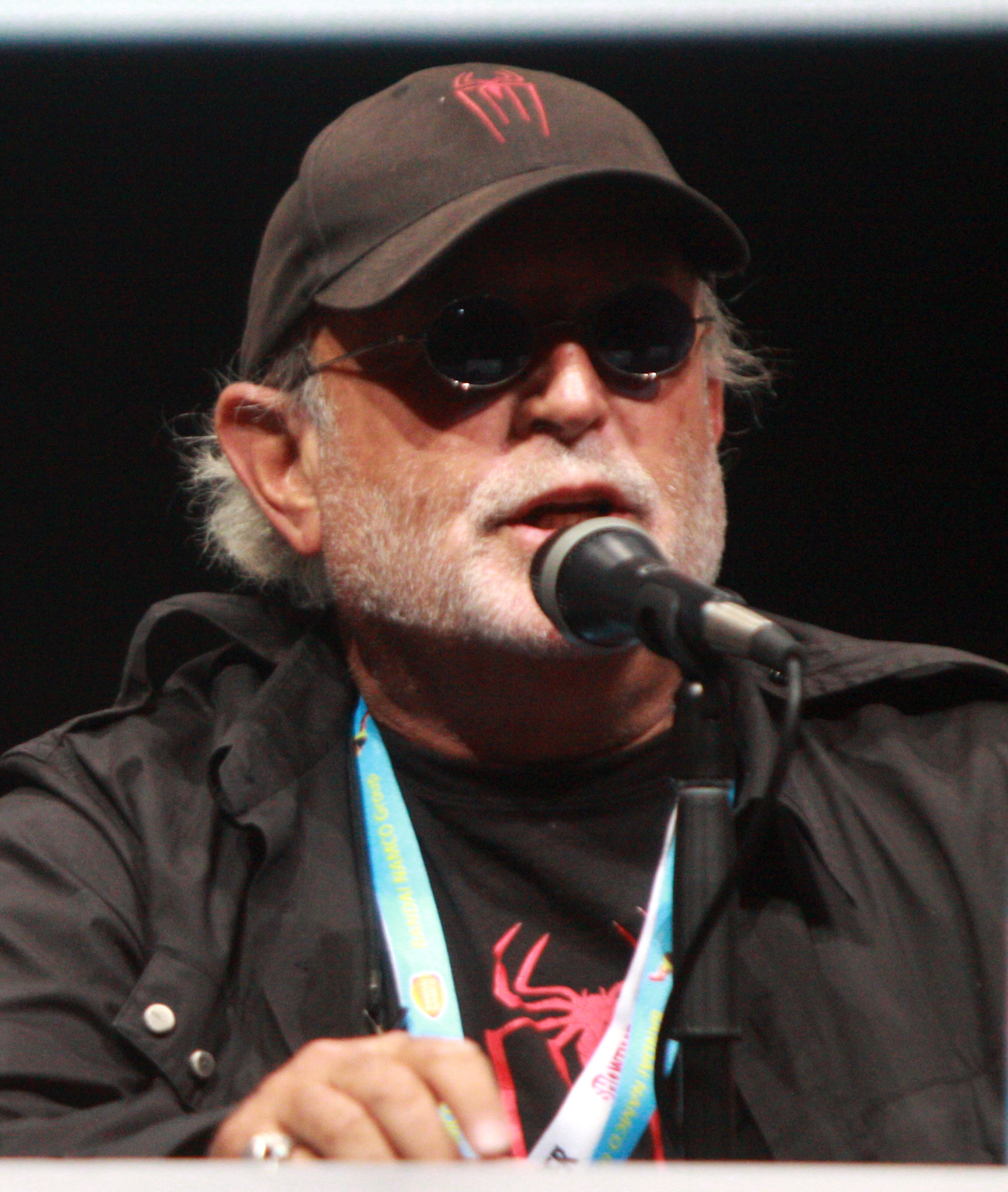
Avi Arad

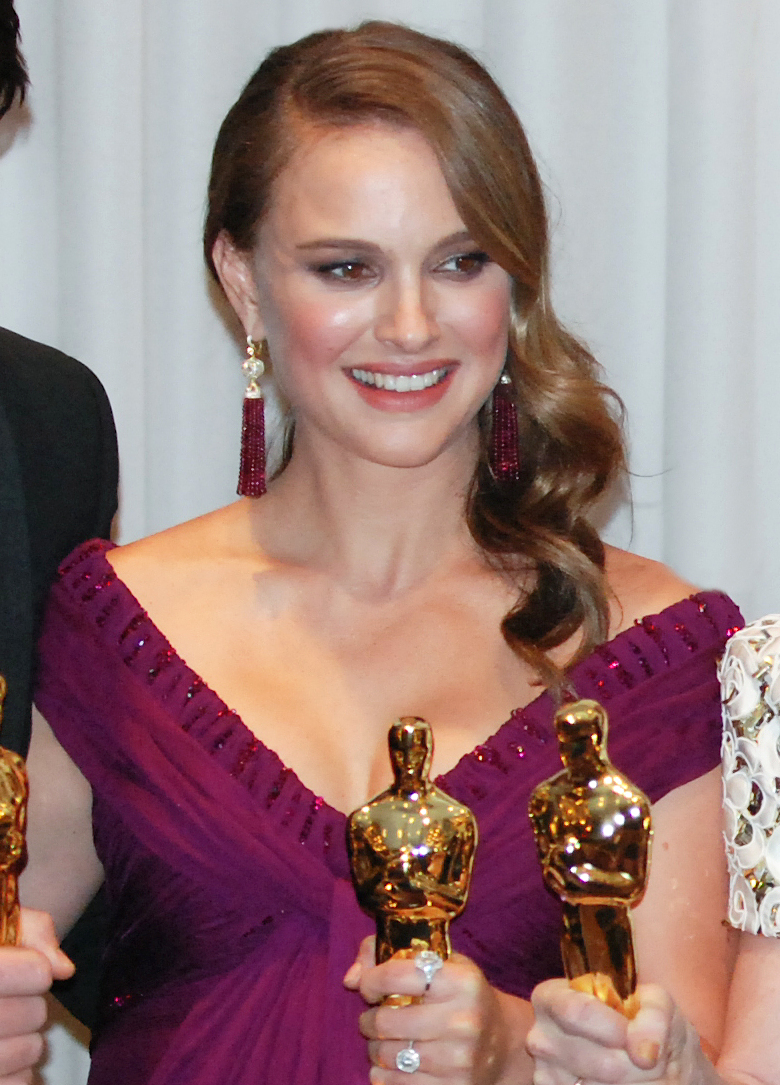
Natalie Portman

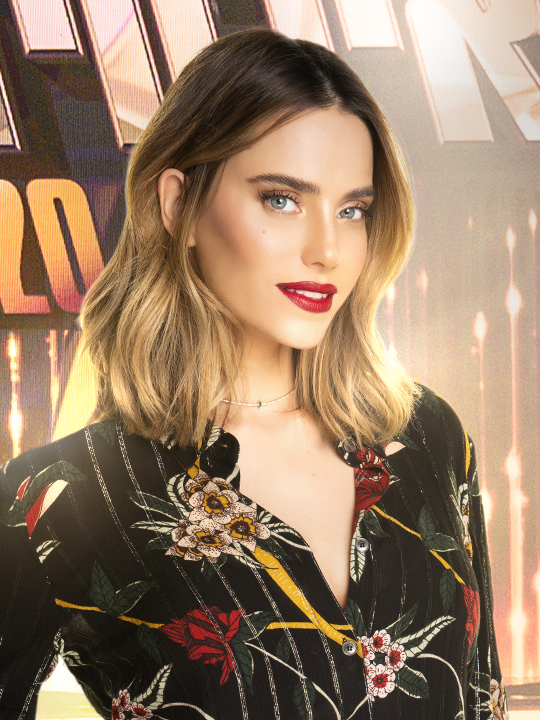
Rotem Sela

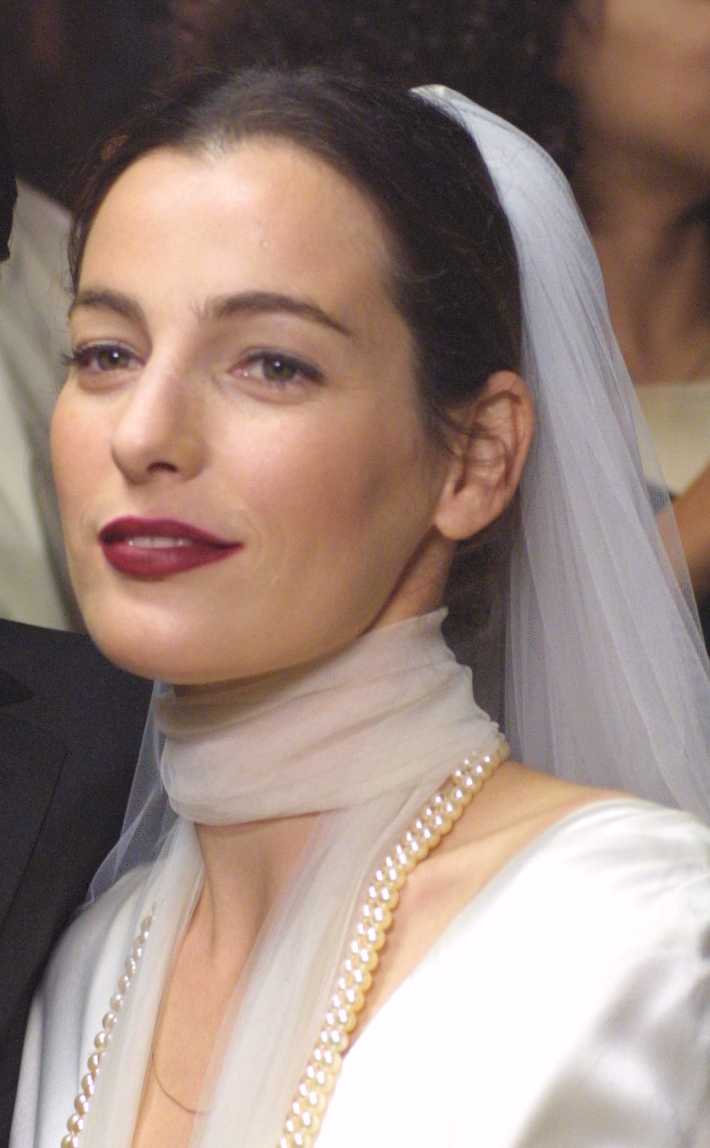
Ayelet Zurer

- Avital Abergel – film and TV actress
- Gila Almagor – actress
- Aviv Alush – actor
- Lior Ashkenazi – actor
- Yossi Atia – film director
- Yvan Attal – actor and director
- Mili Avital – actress
- Aki Avni – actor
- Orna Banai – actress
- Theodore Bikel – actor
- Eddie Carmel, born Oded Ha-Carmeili – actor, singer, and circus sideshow act
- Jason Danino-Holt – television presenter
- Ronit Elkabetz – actress
- David Faitelson – Mexican television sports commentator, born in Israel
- Oded Fehr – actor
- Eytan Fox – director
- Tal Friedman – actor and comedian
- Gal Gadot – actress and mode, Miss Israel 2004
- Uri Geller – TV personality, self-proclaimed psychic
- Amos Gitai – director
- Yasmeen Godder – choreographer and dancer
- Arnon Goldfinger – director
- Yael Grobglas – actress
- Shira Haas – actress
- Dana Ivgy – actress
- Michael Karpin – broadcast journalist and author
- Daphna Kastner – actress; married to actor Harvey Keitel
- Nisan Katz – producer and director
- Juliano Mer-Khamis – actor
- Hila Klein – YouTuber of h3h3productions
- Amos Kollek – director and writer
- Dover Kosashvili – director
- Hanna Laslo – actress
- Daliah Lavi – actress
- Inbar Lavi – actress
- Bar Paly – actress and model
- Jonah Lotan – actor
- Rod Lurie – director and film critic
- Arnon Milchan – producer
- Avi Arad – producer and founder of Marvel Studios
- Samuel Maoz – director
- Ohad Naharin – choreographer
- Eyal Podell – actor
- Orna Porat – actress
- Natalie Portman – actress
- Lior Raz – actor and screenwriter
- Ze'ev Revach – actor and comedian
- Agam Rudberg – actress and model
- Avner Strauss – musician
- Haim Saban – TV producer and co-founder of Saban Entertainment
- Elia Suleiman – director
- Alona Tal – actress
- Noa Tishby – actress and producer
- Chaim Topol – actor
- Raviv Ullman – actor
- Yaron London – journalist and television host
- Keren Yedaya – director
- Becky Griffin – television host and model
- Rotem Sela – television host, actress and model
- Ayelet Zurer – actress
- Odeya Rush – actress and model
- Tomer Capone – actor
- Nuseir Yassin – YouTube vlogger, founder of Nas Daily

=== Musicians ===
==== Classical composers ====
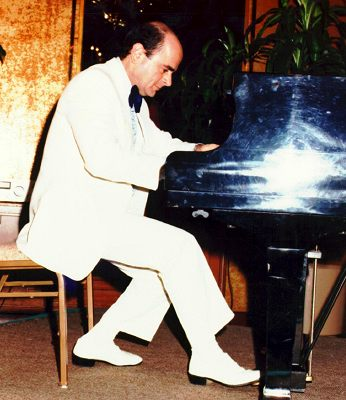
Rami Bar-Niv

- Rami Bar-Niv
- Ofer Ben-Amots
- Paul Ben-Haim
- Avner Dorman
- Dror Elimelech
- Andre Hajdu
- Gilad Hochman
- Mark Kopytman
- Matti Kovler
- Betty Olivero
- Shulamit Ran
- Leon Schidlowsky
- Noam Sheriff
- Gil Shohat
- Josef Tal
- Yitzhak Yedid

==== Classical musicians ====
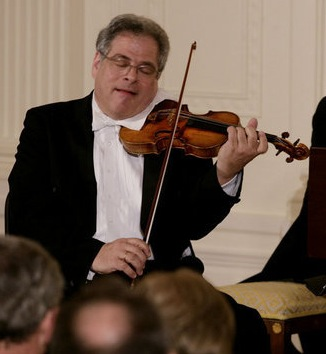
Itzhak Perlman

- Moshe Atzmon – conductor
- Daniel Barenboim – conductor and pianist
- Rami Bar-Niv – pianist and composer
- Bart Berman – pianist
- Gary Bertini – conductor
- Natan Brand – pianist
- Yefim Bronfman – pianist
- Giora Feidman – clarinetist
- Ivry Gitlis – violinist
- Matt Haimovitz – cellist
- Alice Herz-Sommer – pianist
- Ofra Harnoy – cellist
- Eliahu Inbal – conductor
- Sharon Kam – clarinetist
- Amir Katz – pianist
- Evgeny Kissin – pianist
- Yoel Levi – conductor
- Mischa Maisky – cellist
- Shlomo Mintz – violinist
- Itzhak Perlman – violinist
- Inbal Segev – cellist
- Gil Shaham – violinist
- Hagai Shaham – violinist
- Michael Shani – conductor
- Edna Stern – pianist
- Yoav Talmi – conductor
- Arie Vardi – pianist
- Maxim Vengerov – violinist, violist and conductor
- Ilana Vered – pianist
- Pinchas Zukerman – violinist

==== Popular musicians ====
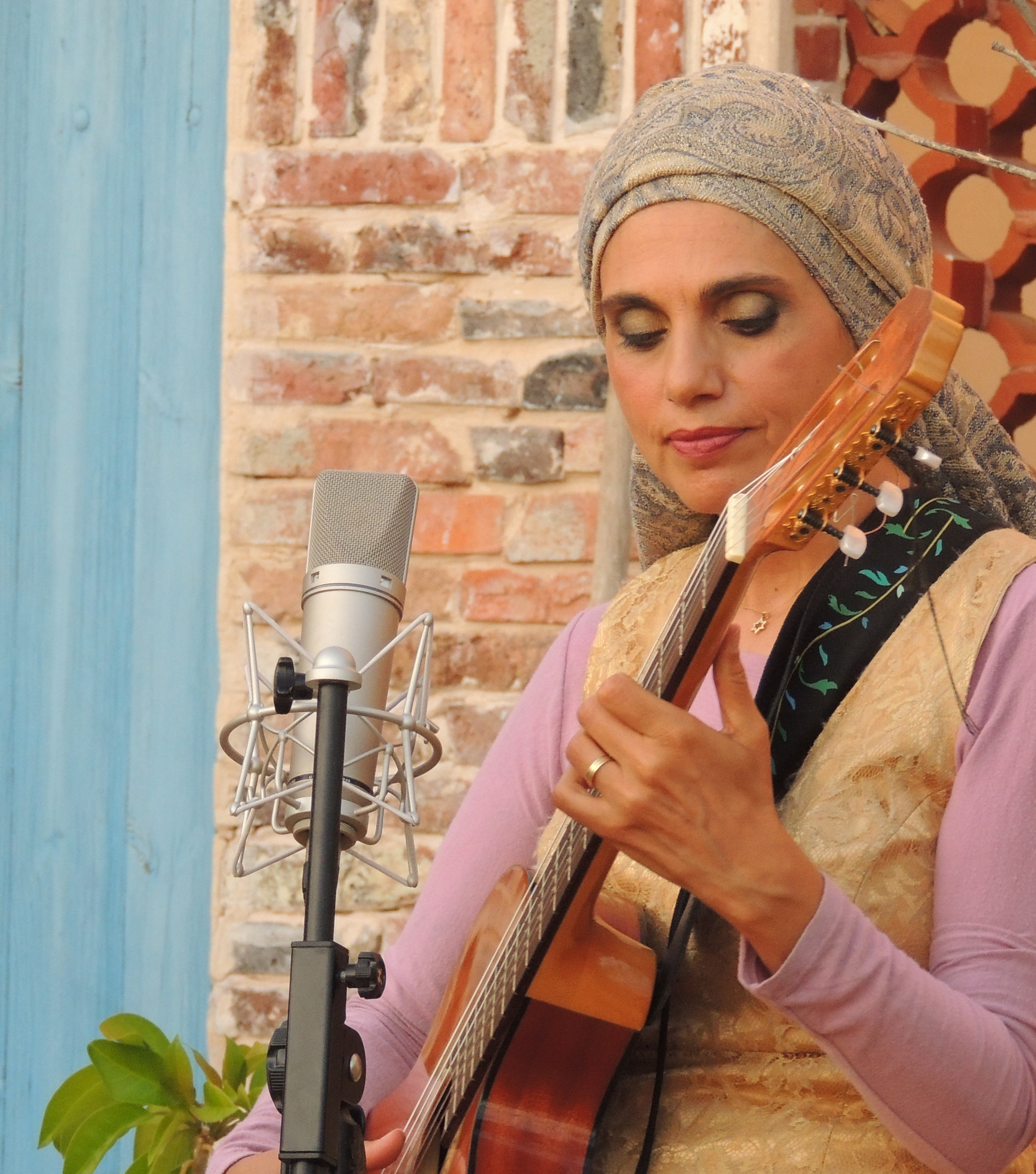
Etti Ankri

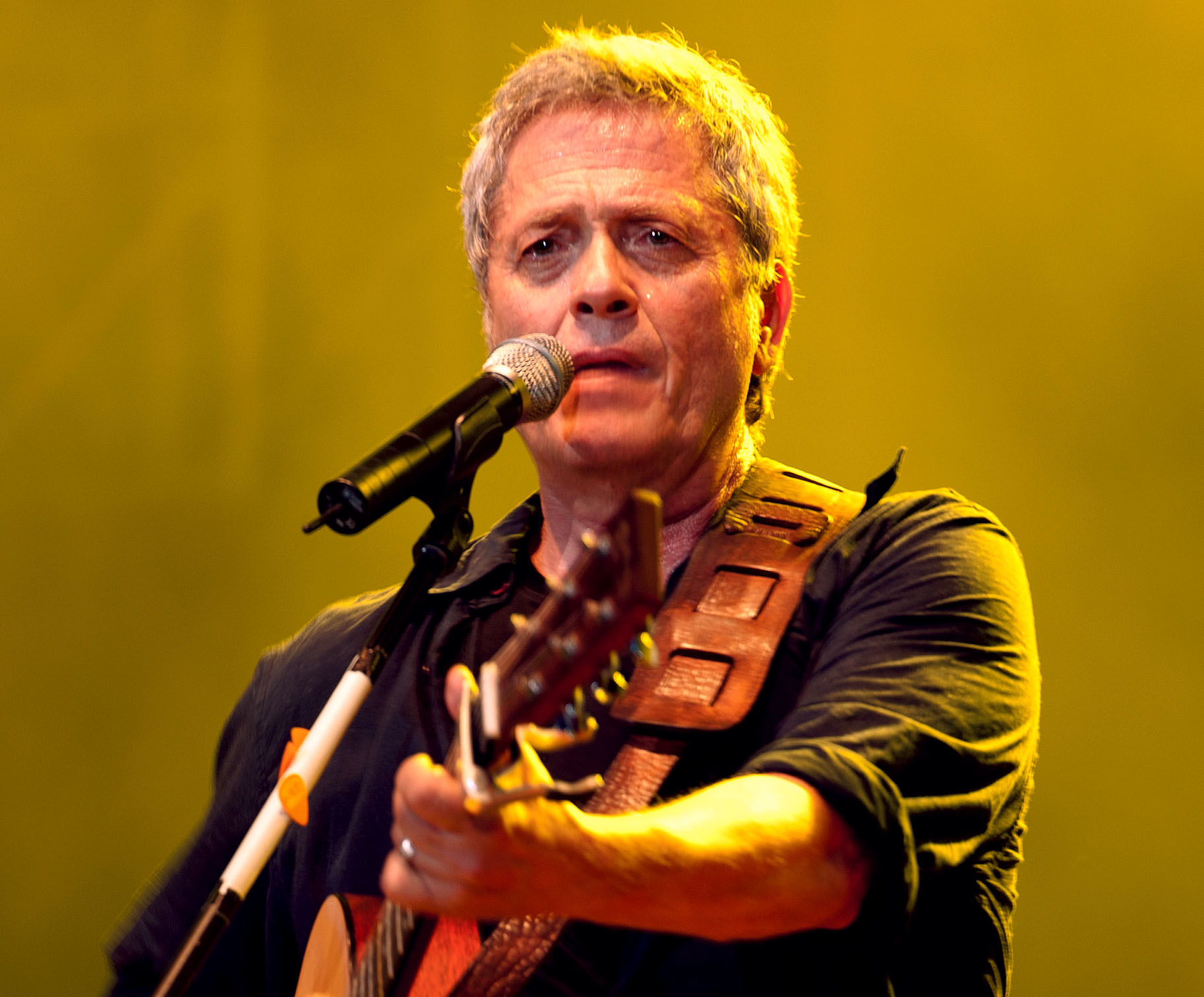
Shlomo Artzi

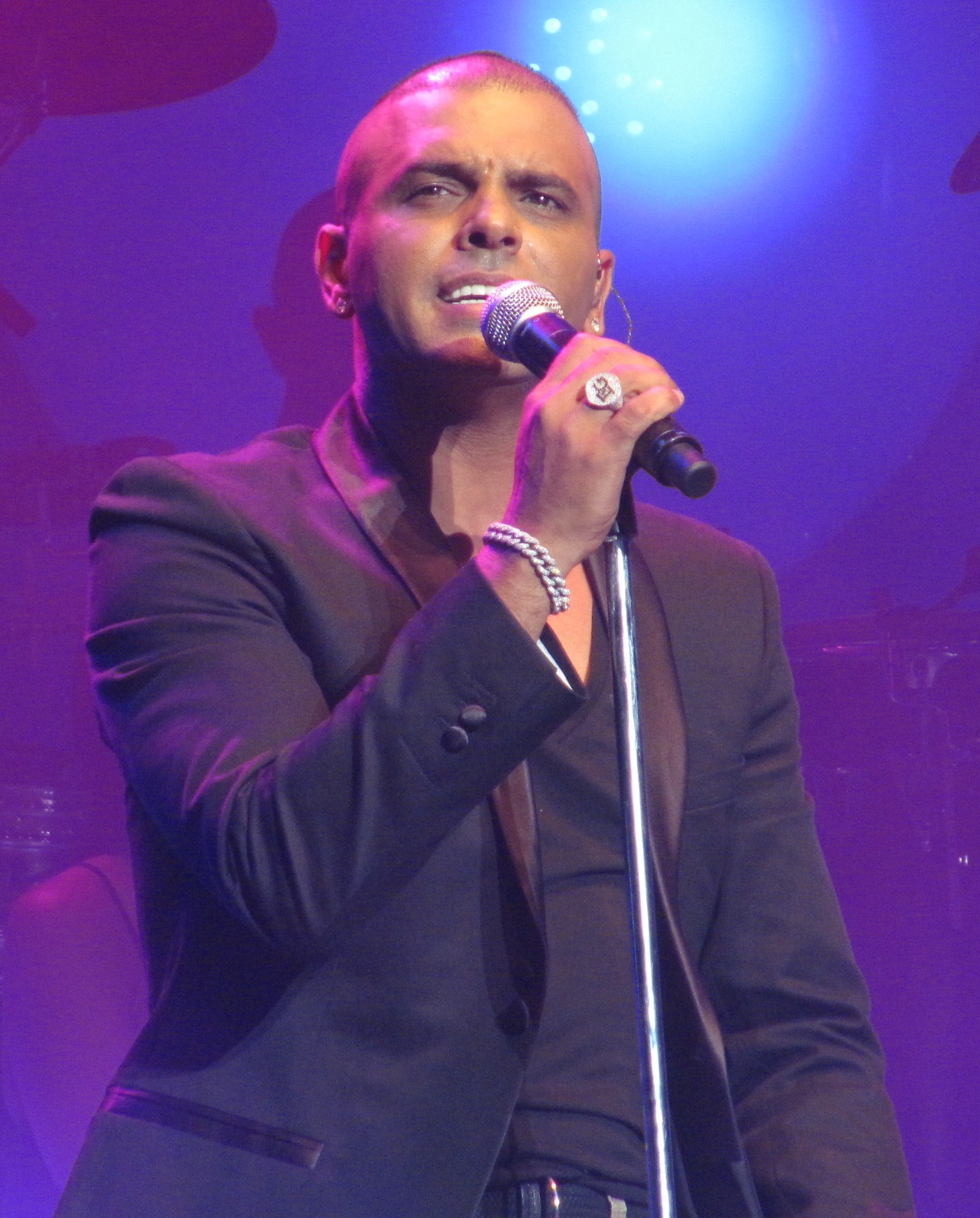
Eyal Golan

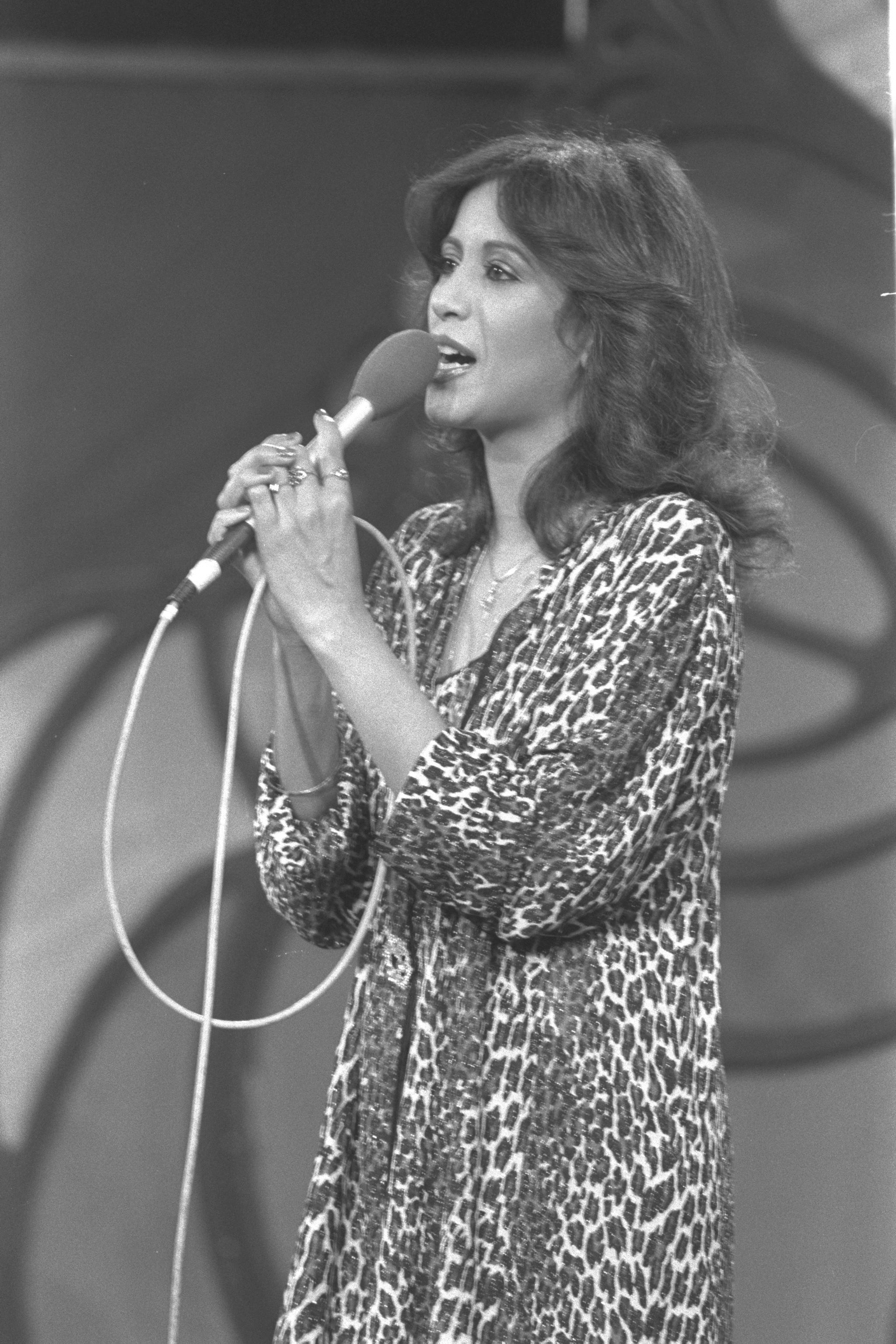
Ofra Haza

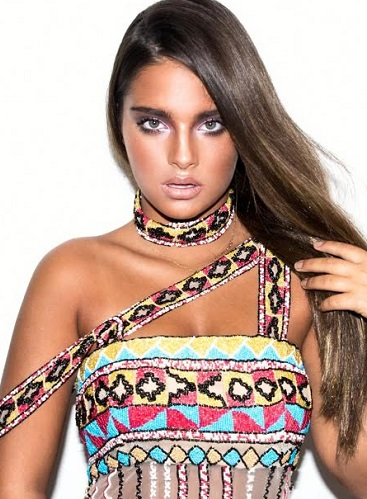
Noa Kirel

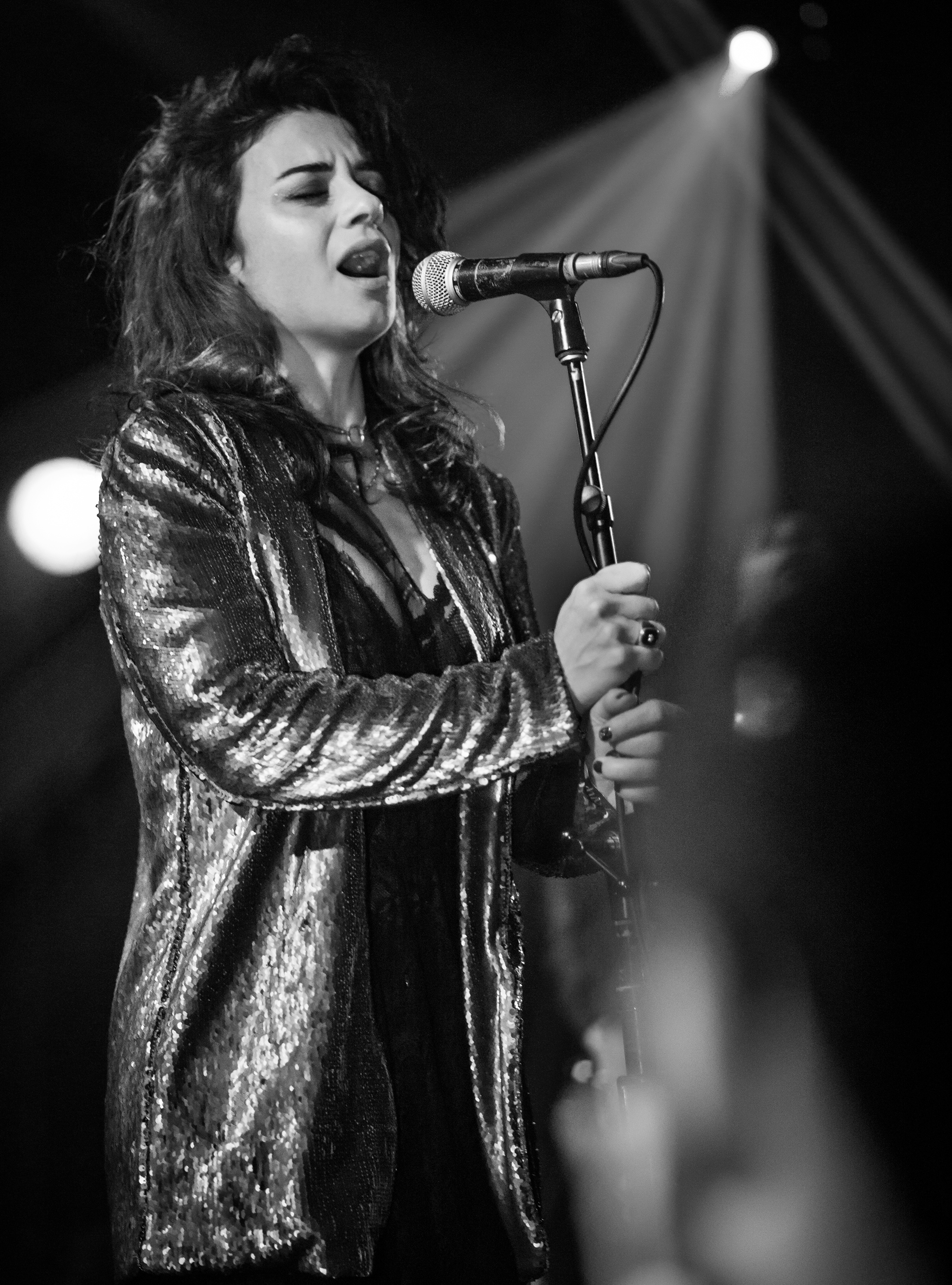
Ninet Tayeb

- Chava Alberstein – singer-songwriter
- Etti Ankri – singer-songwriter
- Yardena Arazi – singer and TV host
- Shlomo Artzi – singer-songwriter
- Ehud Banai – singer-songwriter
- Abatte Barihun – jazz saxophonist and composer
- Eef Barzelay – founder of Clem Snide
- Netta Barzilai – singer
- Miri Ben-Ari – jazz and hip hop violinist
- Mosh Ben-Ari – singer-songwriter
- Borgore – electronic dance music producer and DJ
- Mike Brant – French-language singer
- David Broza – singer-songwriter
- Matti Caspi – singer, multi-instrumentalist and composer
- Avishai Cohen – jazz bassist
- David D'Or – singer-songwriter
- Arkadi Duchin – singer-songwriter, musical producer
- Arik Einstein – singer, actor, writer
- Gad Elbaz – singer
- Ethnix – pop-rock band
- Rita Yahan-Farouz – singer, actress
- Uri Frost – rock guitarist, producer and director
- Aviv Geffen – singer-songwriter
- Eyal Golan – singer
- Gidi Gov – singer
- Dedi Graucher – Orthodox Jewish singer
- Shlomo Gronich – singer and composer
- Nadav Guedj – singer
- Sarit Hadad – Mizrahi singer
- Victoria Hanna – singer-songwriter
- Ofra Haza – singer
- Dana International – pop singer
- Ishtar – vocalist for Alabina
- Rami Kleinstein – singer-songwriter, composer
- Ehud Manor – songwriter and translator
- Amal Murkus – singer
- Infected Mushroom – musical duo
- Yael Naïm – solo singer/musician
- Ahinoam Nini (Noa) – singer
- Esther Ofarim – singer
- Yehuda Poliker – singer
- Ester Rada – singer
- Idan Raichel – Ethiopian and Israeli music
- Yoni Rechter – composer and arranger
- Ishai Ribo – singer-songwriter
- Berry Sakharof – singer
- Naomi Shemer – songwriter
- Gene Simmons (real name Chaim Weitz) – lead member of Kiss
- Hillel Slovak – original guitarist for Red Hot Chili Peppers
- Pe'er Tasi – singer-songwriter
- Ninet Tayeb – pop rock singer and actress
- Hagit Yaso – singer
- Rika Zaraï – singer
- Nir Zidkyahu – drummer, briefly in Genesis
- Zino and Tommy – popular duo, songs in US films
- Eden Ben Zaken – singer
- Noa Kirel – singer and actress
- Rucka Rucka Ali – rapper, YouTuber, parodist
- Temper City – band known for Hot 100 hit Self Aware

=== News anchors ===
- Yonit Levi
- Haim Yavin
- Miki Haimovich
- Ya'akov Eilon
- Yigal Ravid
- Ya'akov Ahimeir

=== Poets ===
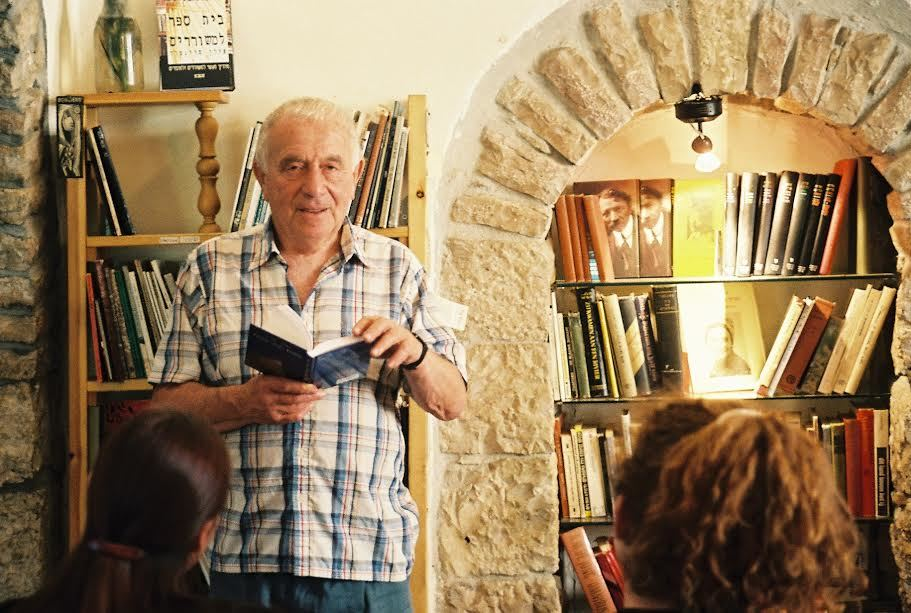
Yehuda Amichai

- Nathan Alterman
- Yehuda Amichai
- Sivan Beskin
- Erez Biton
- Leah Goldberg
- Uri Zvi Greenberg
- Vaan Nguyen
- Dahlia Ravikovich
- Naomi Shemer – songwriter and lyricist
- Avraham Shlonsky
- Avraham Stern
- Abraham Sutzkever
- Yona Wallach
- Nathan Zach
- Zelda

=== Writers ===
- Shmuel Yosef Agnon (Shmuel Yosef Halevi Czaczkes) – author, Nobel Prize in Literature (1966)
- Aharon Appelfeld – Prix Médicis étranger (2004)
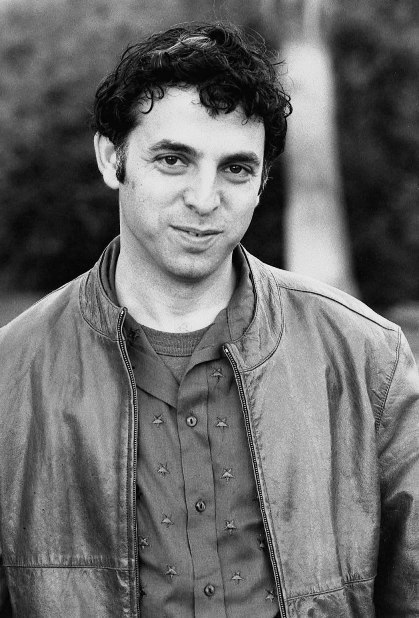
- Etgar Keret
  Yoni Ben-Menachem – journalist
- Ron Ben-Yishai – journalist
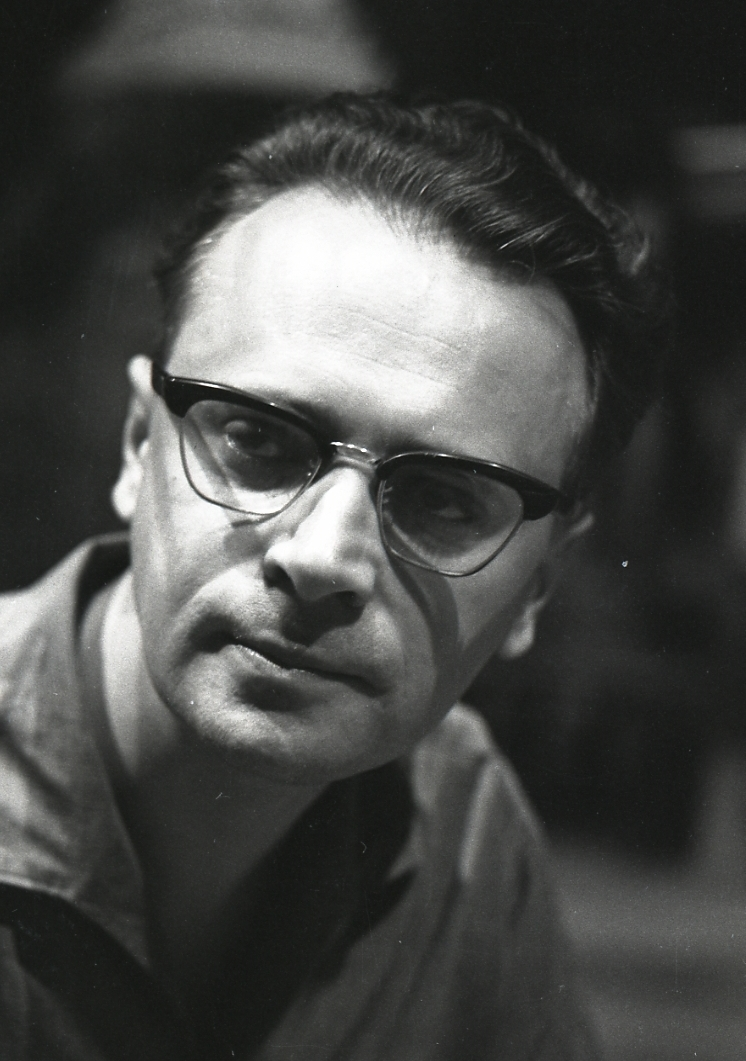
  Ephraim Kishon, author and satirist
- Nahum Benari – author and playwright
- Max Brod – author, composer and friend of Kafka
- Orly Castel-Bloom – author
- Yehonatan Geffen – author, poet and lyricist
- David Grossman – author
- Batya Gur – author
- Emile Habibi – author
- Amira Hass – journalist and author
- Shmuel Katz – author and journalist
- Etgar Keret – author
- Adi Keissar – poet
- Ephraim Kishon – satirist
- Hanoch Levin – playwright
- Julius Margolin – writer
- Aharon Megged – author
- Sami Michael – author
- Samir Naqqash – author
- Uri Orlev – author, Hans Christian Andersen Award (1996)
- Amos Oz (Amos Klausner) – author and journalist, Goethe Prize (2005)
- Ruchoma Shain – author
- Meir Shalev – author and journalist
- Zeruya Shalev – author
- Moshe Shamir – author, poet
- Mati Shemoelof – poet, editor and journalist
- Lilac Sigan – writer, journalist, and public speaker
- Mordechai Tsanin – journalist, writer
- Chaim Walder – Haredi children's writer
- A.B. Yehoshua – author
- Benny Ziffer – author, journalist and translator

== Entrepreneurs ==
=== Tech ===
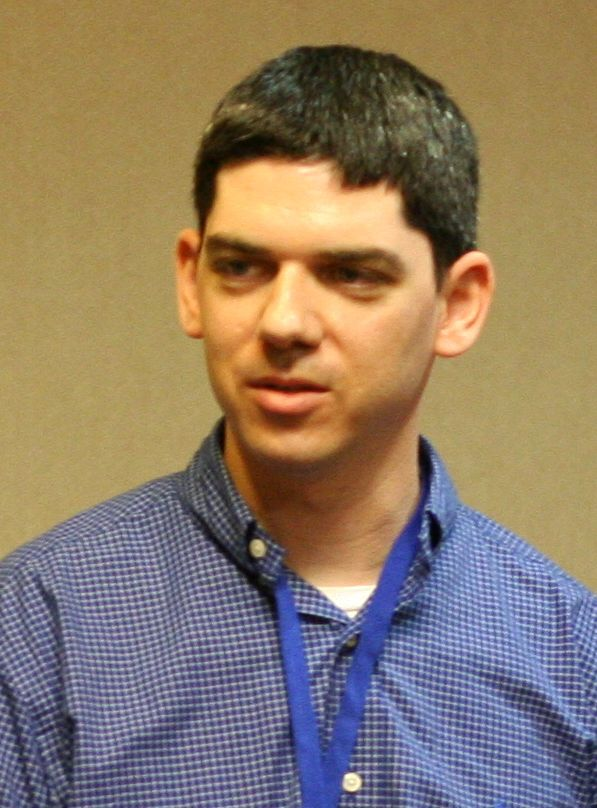
Andi Gutmans

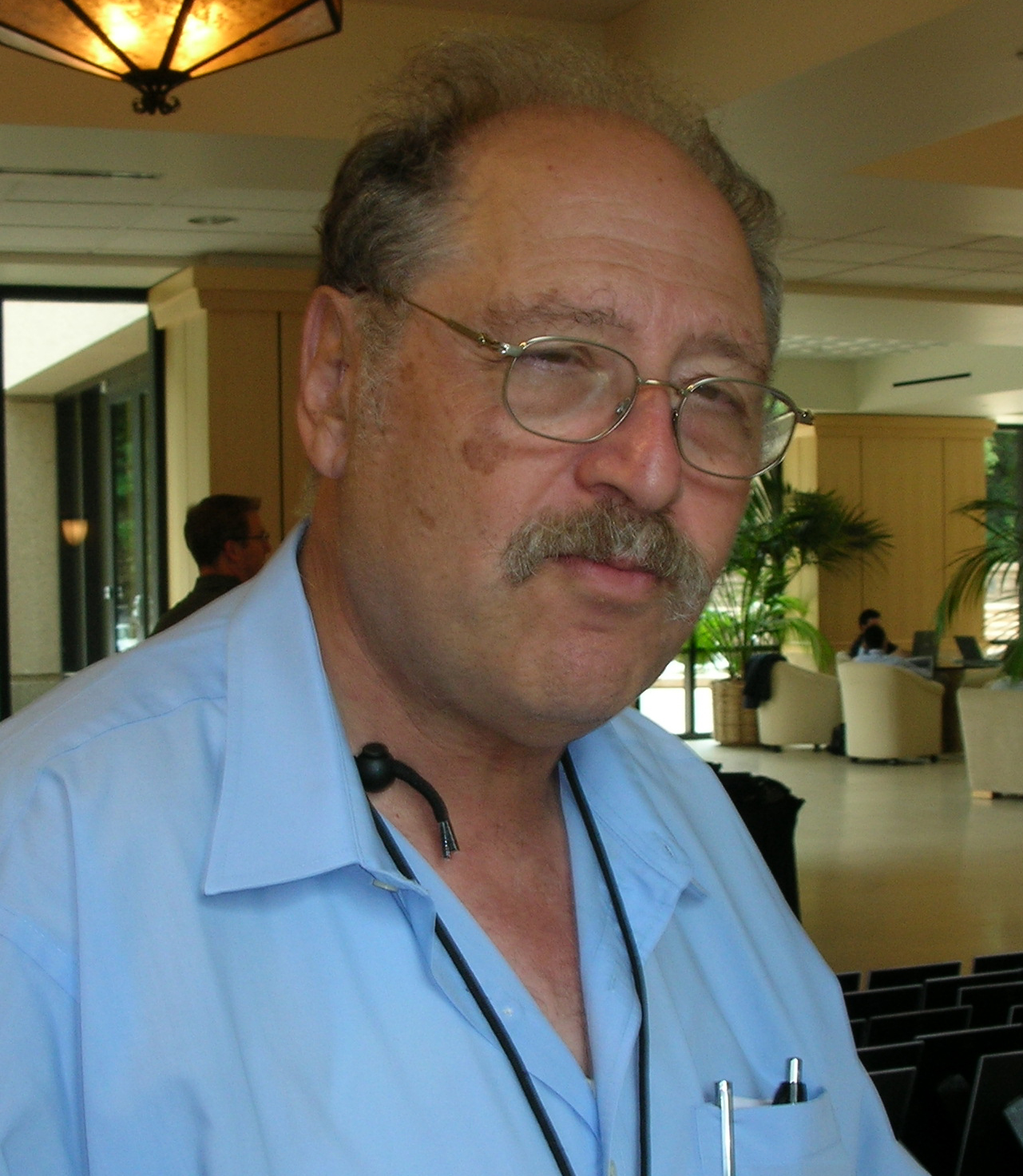
Yossi Vardi

- Beny Alagem – founder of Packard Bell
- Moshe Bar – founder of XenSource, Qumranet
- Safra Catz – president of Oracle
- Yossi Gross – recipient of almost 600 patents, founder of 27 medical technology companies in Israel and the Chief Technology Office officer of Rainbow Medical.
- Itzik Kotler – founder and CTO of SafeBreach, Information Security Specialist
- Daniel M. Lewin – founder of Akamai Technologies
- Shai Reshef – educational entrepreneur, founder and president of University of the People
- Bob Rosenschein – founder of GuruNet, Answers.com (Israeli-based)
- Gil Schwed – founder of Check Point
- Zeev Suraski and Andi Gutmans – founders of Zend Technologies (developers of PHP)
- Arik and Yossi Vardi, Yair Goldfinger, Sefi Vigiser and Amnon Amir – founders of Mirabilis (developers of ICQ)
- Zohar Zisapel – co-founder of the RAD Group
- Iftach Ian Amit – co-founder of BeeFence, prominent Hacker and Information Security Practitioner

=== Other ===
- Ted, Micky and Shari Arison – founder/owners of Carnival Corporation
- Shahar Botzer – venture capitalist
- Yossi Dina – pawnbroker
- Dan Gertler – diamond tycoon
- Alec Gores – Israeli-American businessman and investor.
- Eli Hurvitz – head of Teva Pharmaceuticals
- Lev Leviev – diamond tycoon
- Mordecai Meirowitz – inventor of the Mastermind board game
- Aviad Meitar
- Dorrit Moussaieff – Israeli-British businesswoman, entrepreneur, philanthropist and the First Lady of Iceland
- Sammy Ofer – shipping magnate
- Guy Oseary – head of Maverick Records, manager of Madonna
- Isaac Perlmutter – chairman and former CEO of Marvel Entertainment
- Itschak Shrem – investor
- Guy Spier – author and investor
- Beny Steinmetz – diamond tycoon
- Stef Wertheimer – industrialist

== Fashion models ==
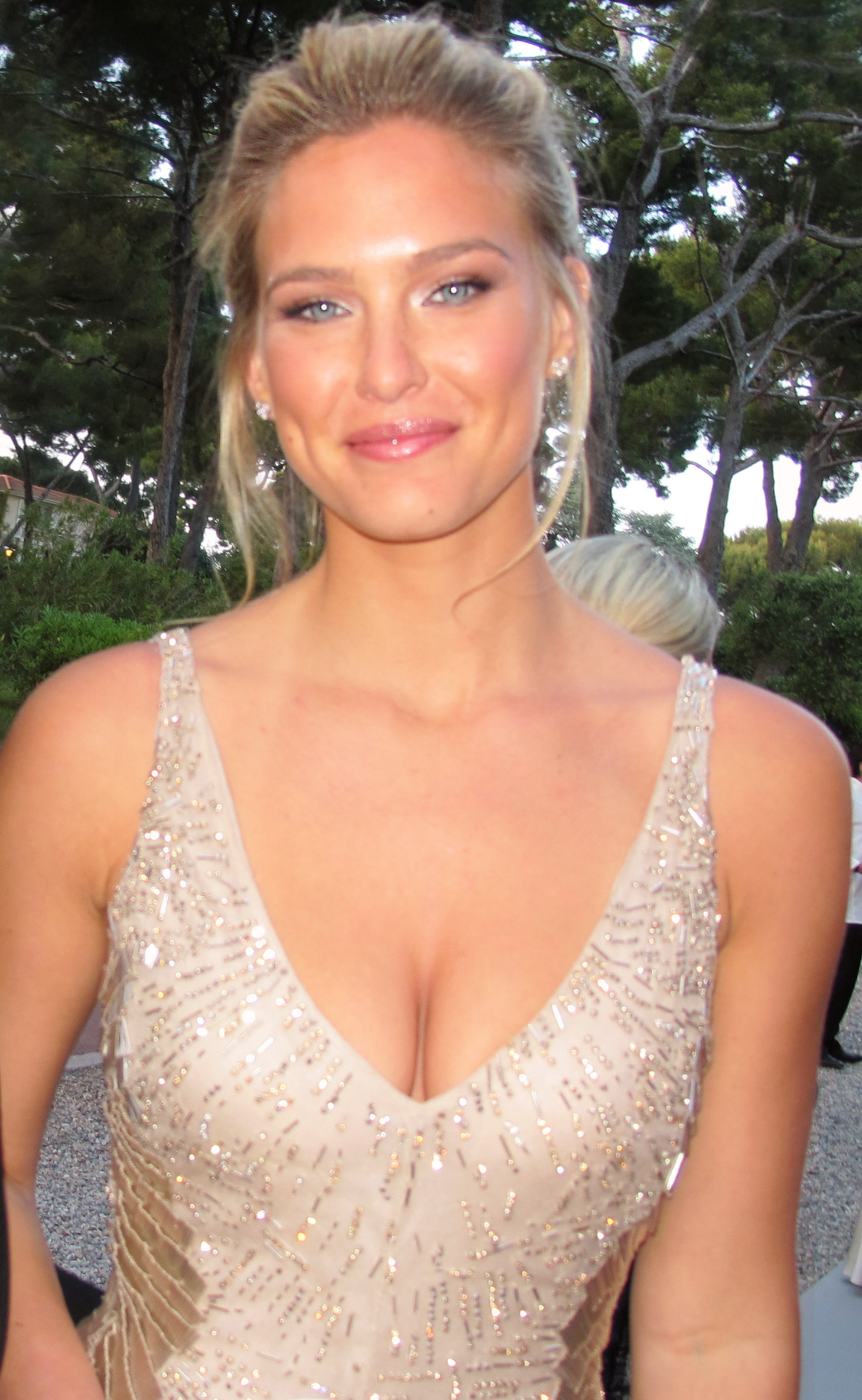
Bar Refaeli

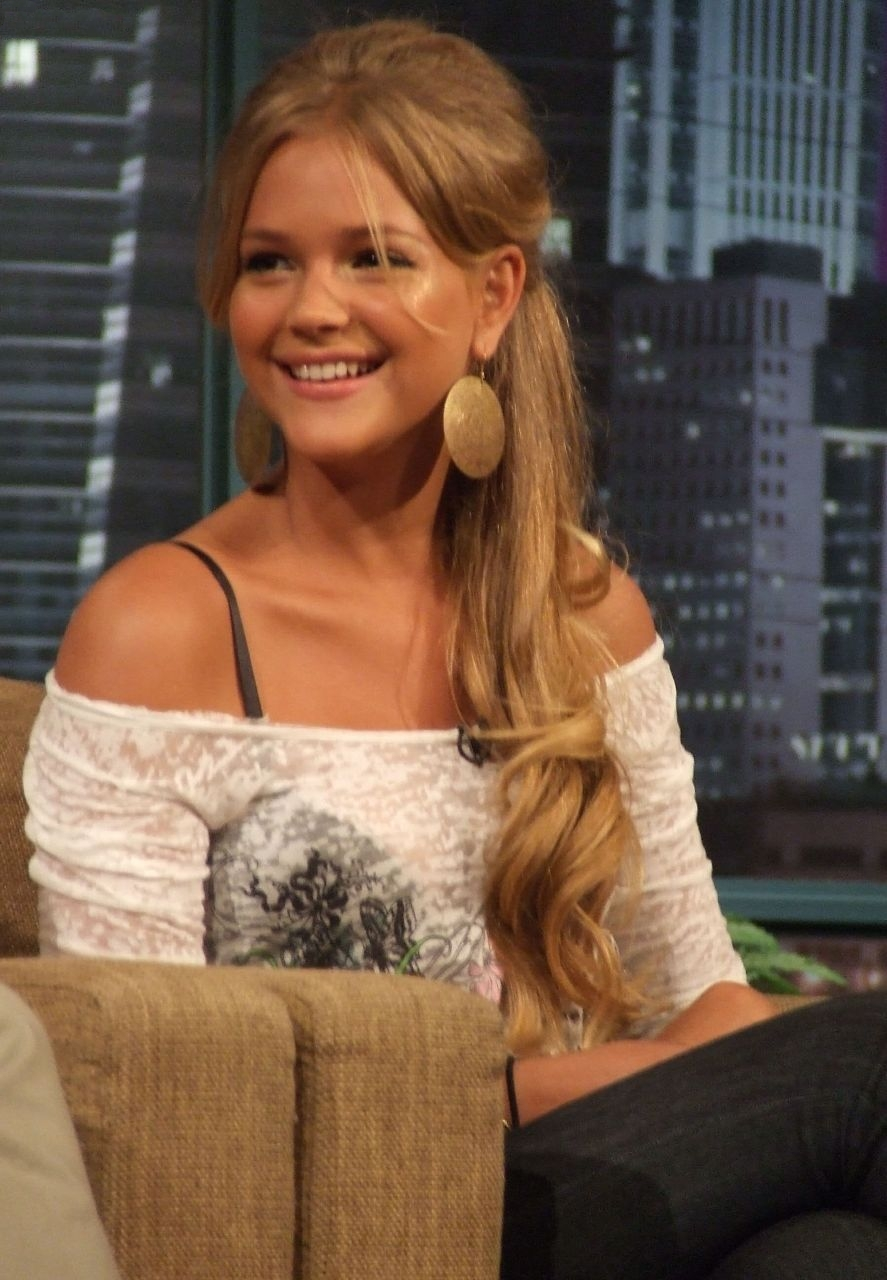
Esti Ginzburg

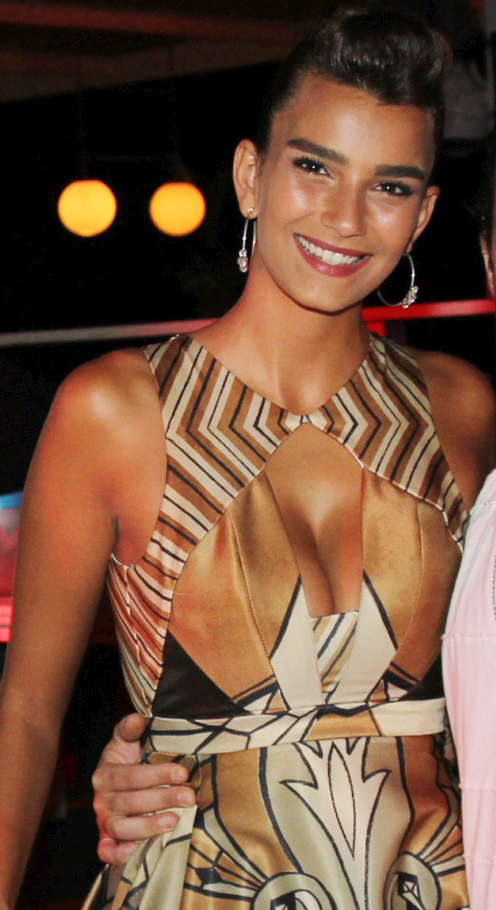
Shani Hazan

- Neta Alchimister (female)
- Moran Atias (female)
- Sendi Bar (female)
- Nina Brosh (female)
- Chava Mond (female)
- Pnina Rosenblum (female) – Knesset parliament member for Likud (2005–2006)
- Orly Levy-Abekasis (female) – Knesset parliament member for Likud (2009–) and minister (2020–2021)
- Noa Tishby (female)
- Tami Ben-Ami (female)
- Sharon Ganish (female)
- Maayan Keret (female)
- Michaela Bercu (female)
- Esti Ginzburg (female)
- Yael Shelbia (female)
- Shlomit Malka (female)
- Tahounia Rubel (female)
- Yityish Titi Aynaw (female) – Miss Israel 2013
- Shani Hazan (female) – Miss Israel 2012 at both Miss World 2012 and Miss International 2014
- Raz Meirman (male)
- Michael Lewis (male)
- Agam Rudberg (female)
- Bar Refaeli (female)
- Yael Goldman (female)
- Odeya Rush (female)
- Gal Gadot (female) – Miss Israel 2004
- Avigail Alfatov (female) – Na'art Israel (Miss Israel's runner-up) at Miss Universe 2015
- Miri Bohadana (female) – Na'art Israel (Miss Israel's runner-up)at Miss World 1995
- Anat Zamir (female) – Na'art Israel (Miss Israel's runner-up) at Miss World 1980
- Adi Himelbloy (female)
- Linor Abargil (female) – Miss Israel and Miss World 1998
- Rina Mor (female) – Miss Israel and Miss Universe 1976

== Military ==
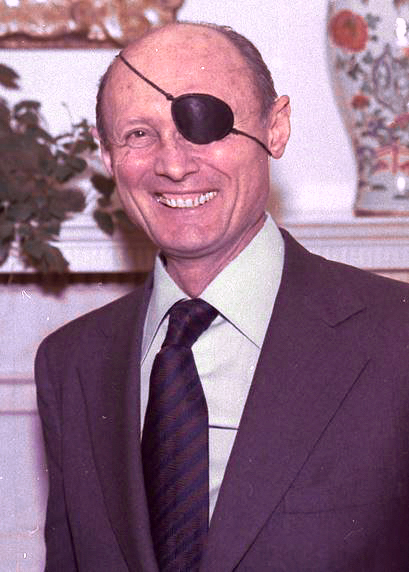
Moshe Dayan

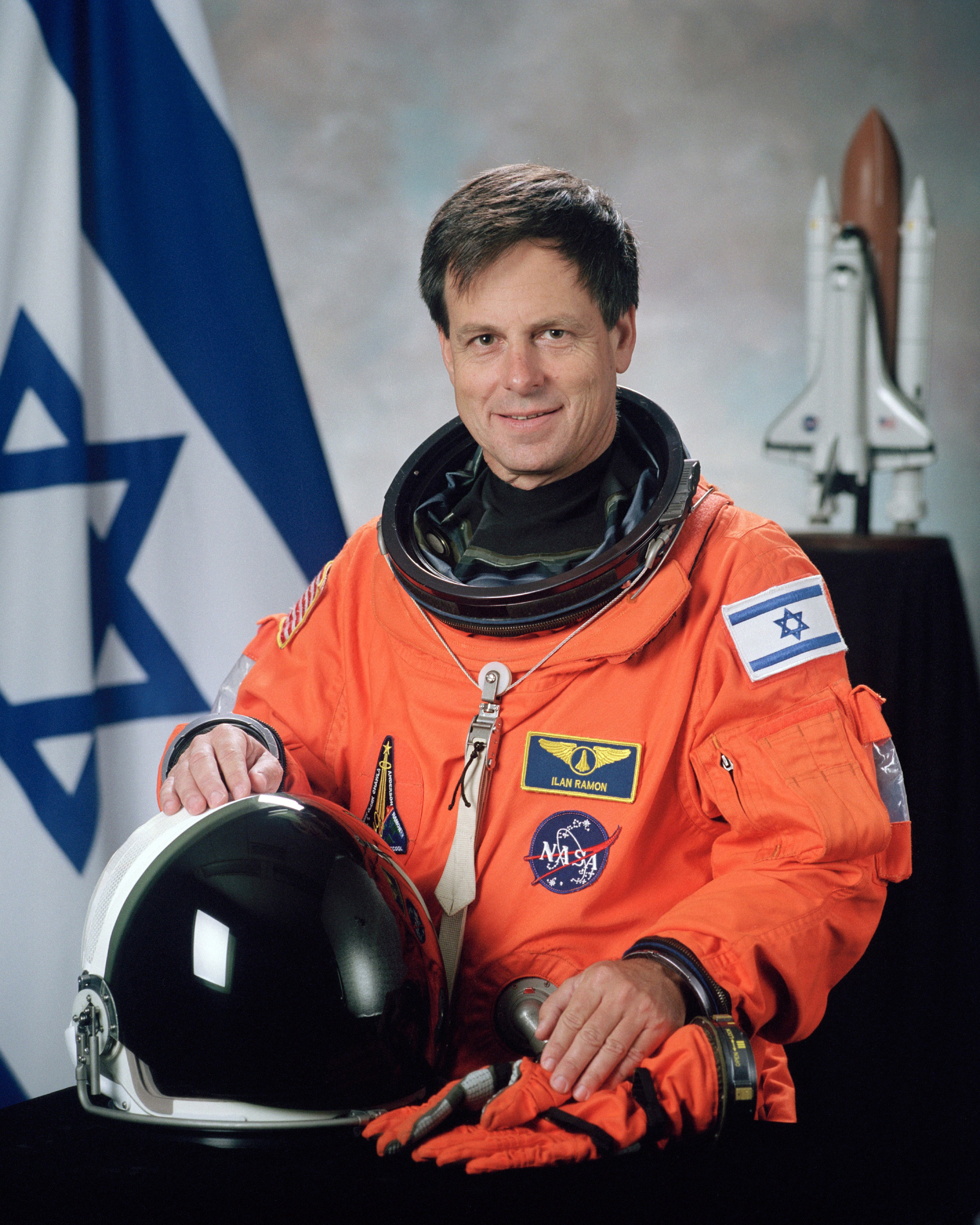
Ilan Ramon

- Ron Arad – MIA navigator
- Gabi Ashkenazi – Chief of the IDF General Staff
- Yohai Ben-Nun – sixth commander of the Israeli Navy
- Elihu Ben-Onn – Brigadier General, spokesman of the Israel Police
- Eli Cohen – spy
- Moshe Dayan – military leader
- Rafael Eitan – Chief of the IDF General Staff
- Gadi Eizenkot – Chief of the IDF General Staff
- David Elazar – Chief of the IDF General Staff
- Giora Epstein – combat pilot, modern-day "ace of aces"
- Hoshea Friedman – brigadier general in the IDF
- Uziel Gal – designer of the Uzi submachine gun
- Benny Gantz – Chief of the IDF General Staff
- Dan Halutz – Chief of the IDF General Staff
- Wolfgang Lotz – spy
- Tzvi Malkhin – Mossad agent, captured Adolf Eichmann
- Eli Marom – former commander of the Israeli Navy
- Yonatan Netanyahu – Sayeret Matkal commando, leader of Operation Entebbe
- Ilan Ramon – astronaut on Columbia flight STS-107
- Gilad Shalit – kidnapped soldier held in Gaza, released in 2011
- Yoel Strick – general
- Israel Tal – general, father of Merkava tank
- Ella Waweya - known as Captain Ella, highest-ranking Muslim Arab woman in the IDF
- Moshe Ya'alon – Chief of the IDF General Staff
- Yigael Yadin – Chief of the IDF General Staff

== Politicians ==
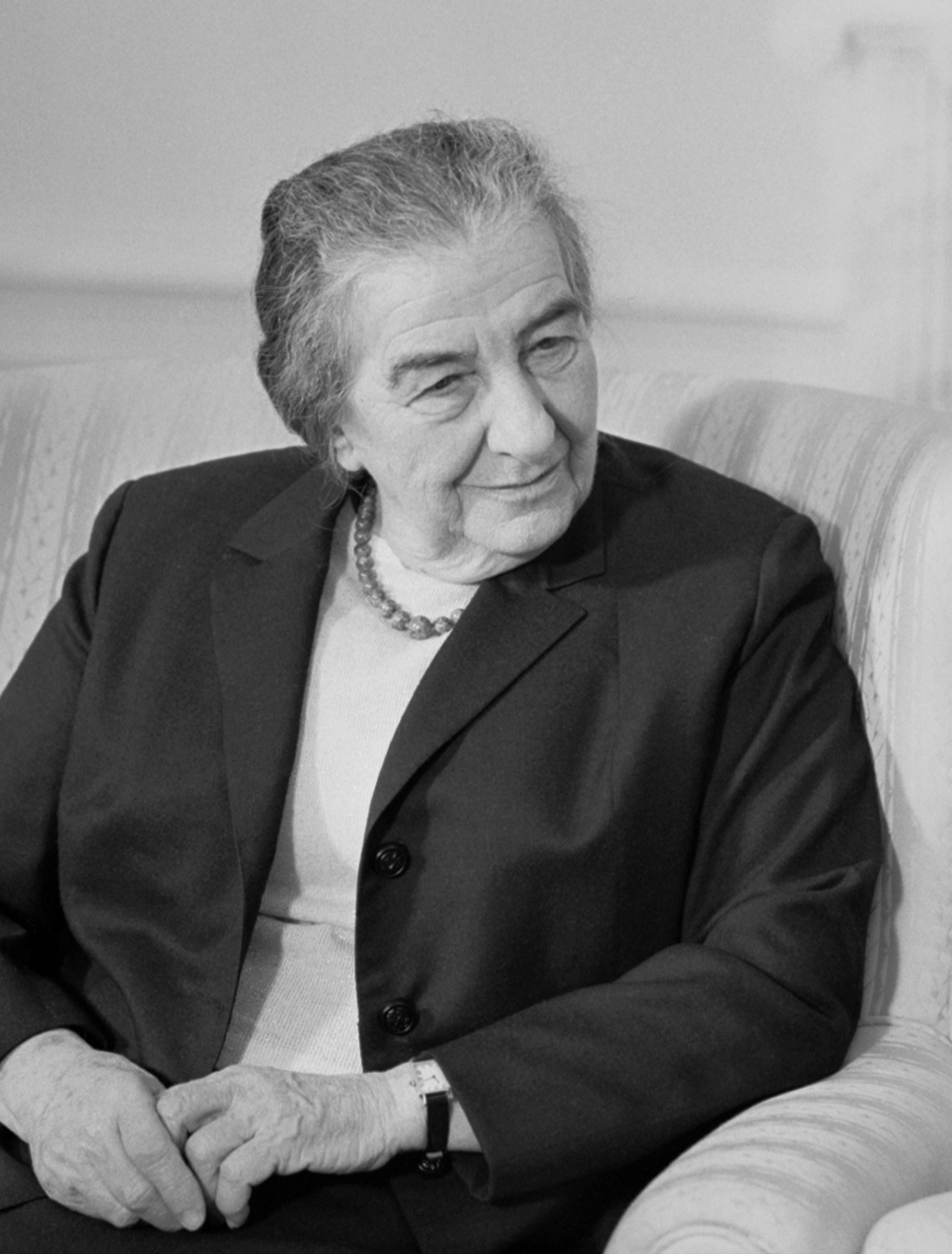
Golda Meir

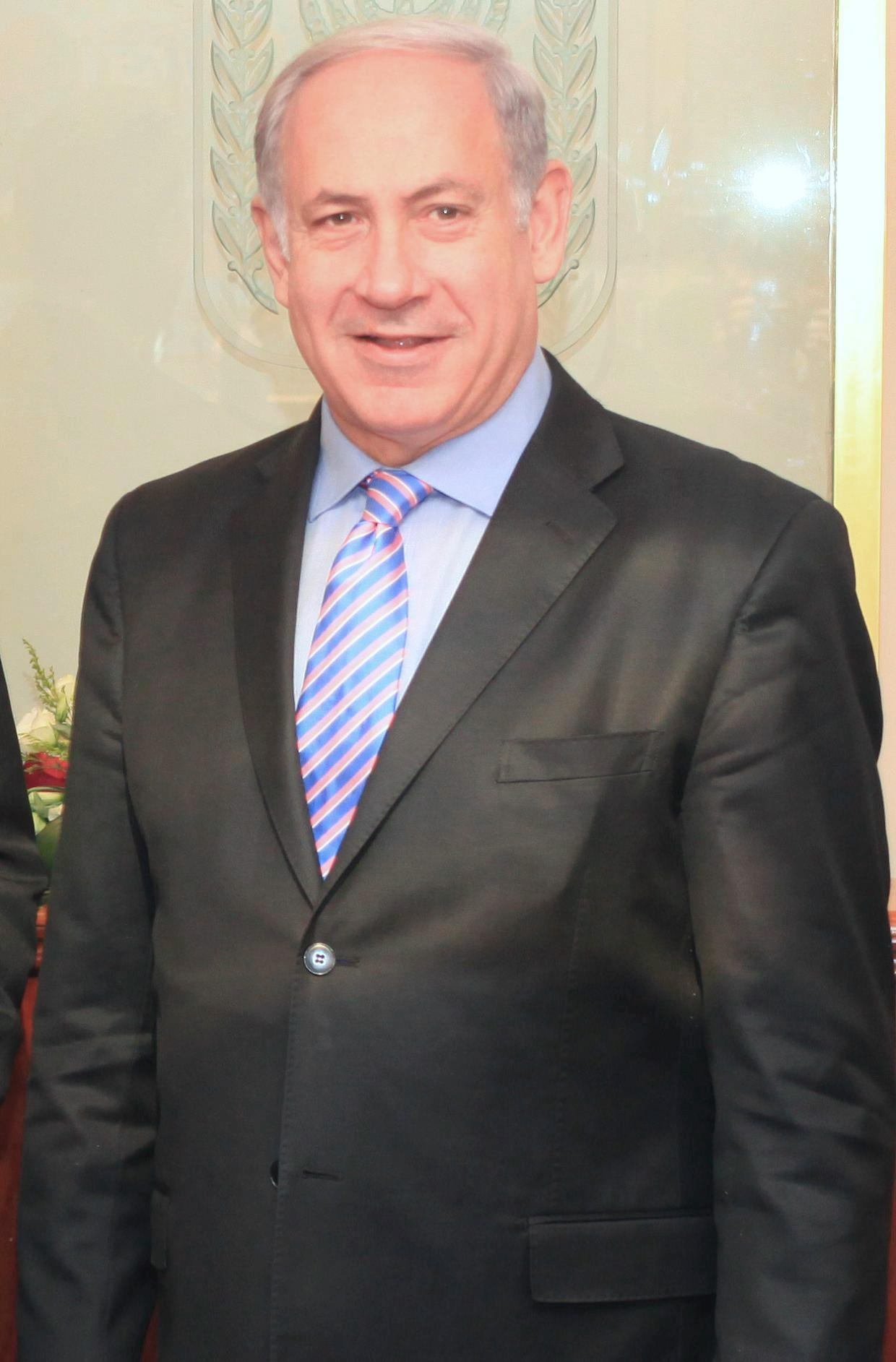
Benjamin Netanyahu

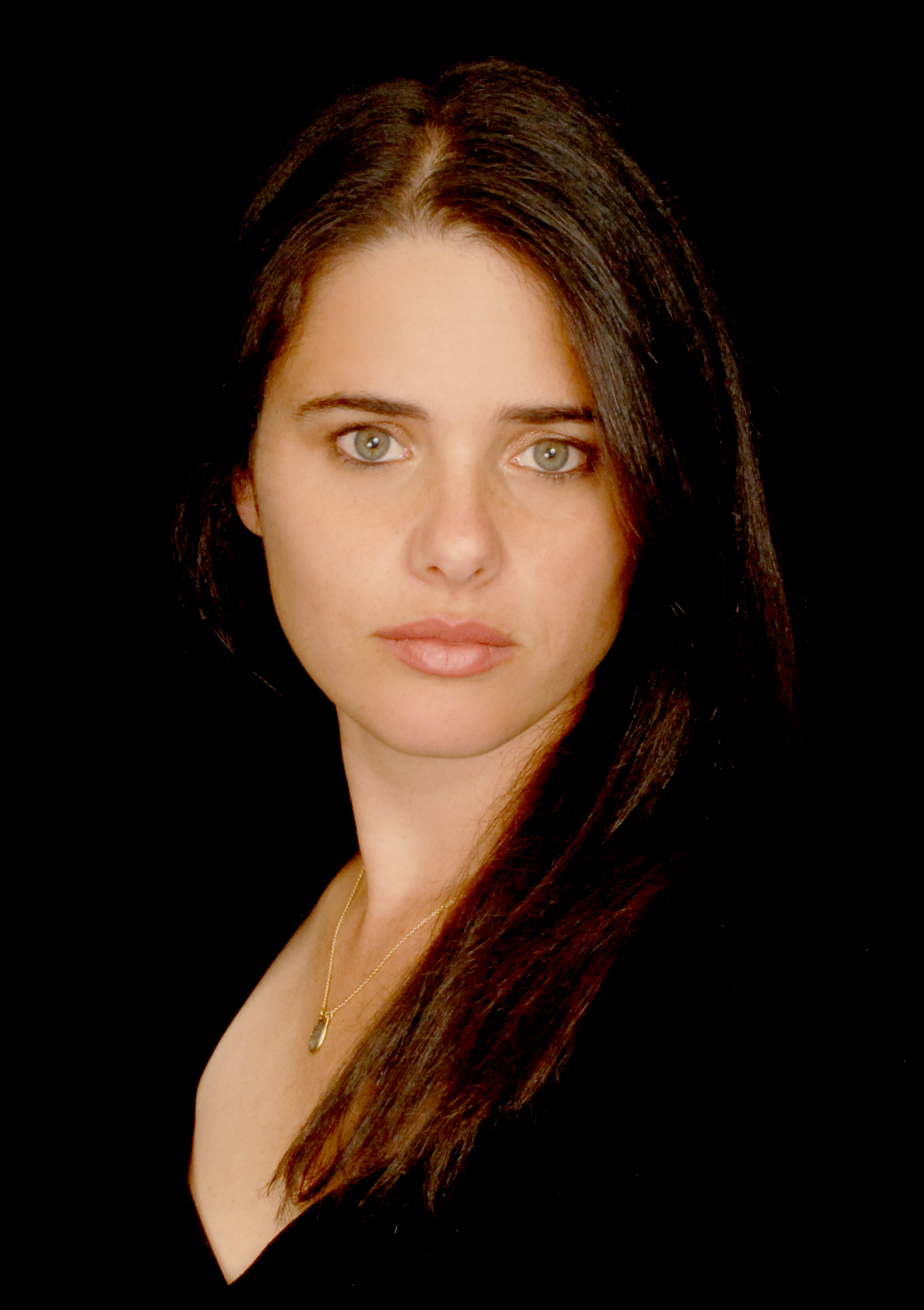
Ayelet Shaked

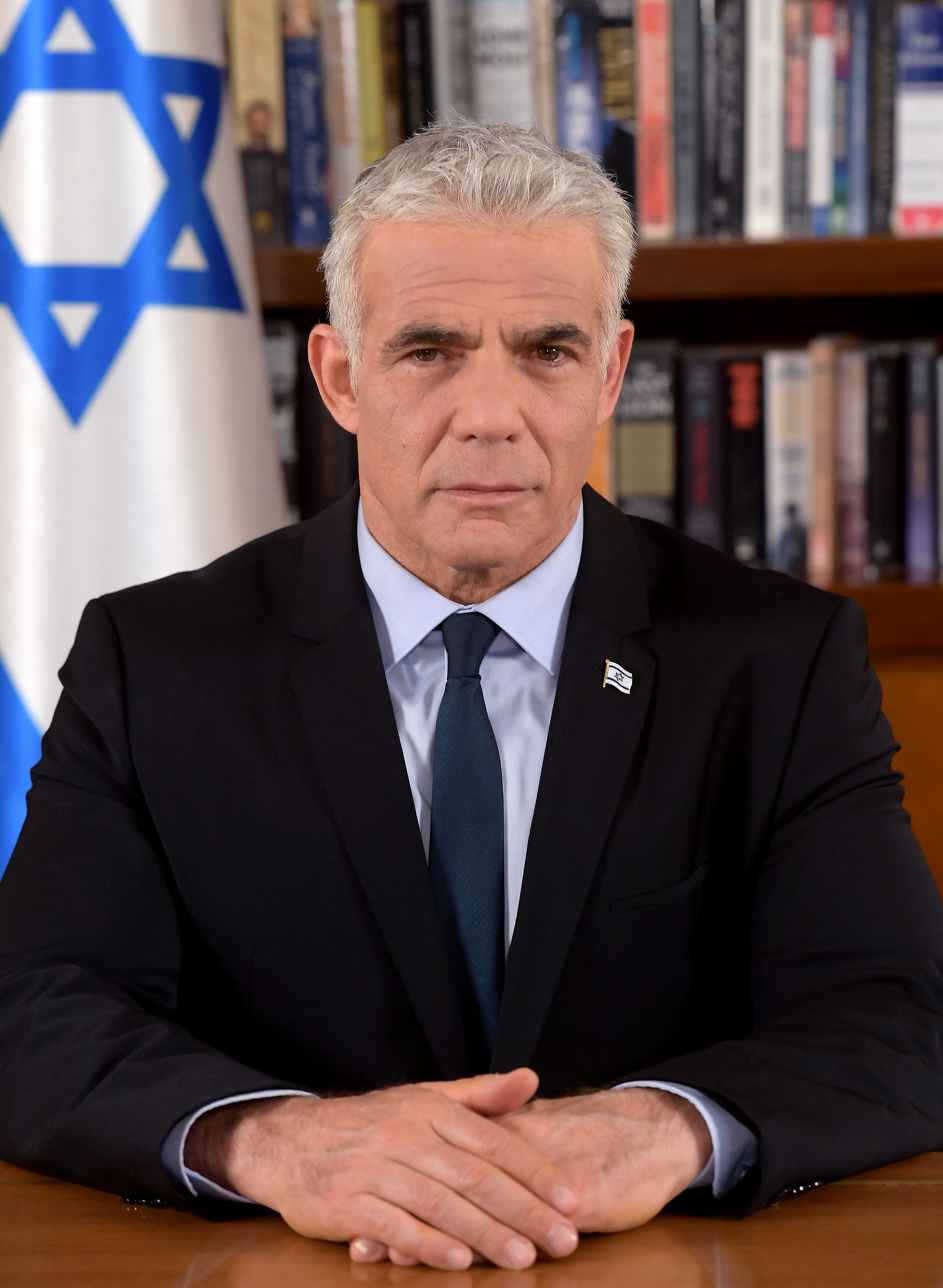
Yair Lapid

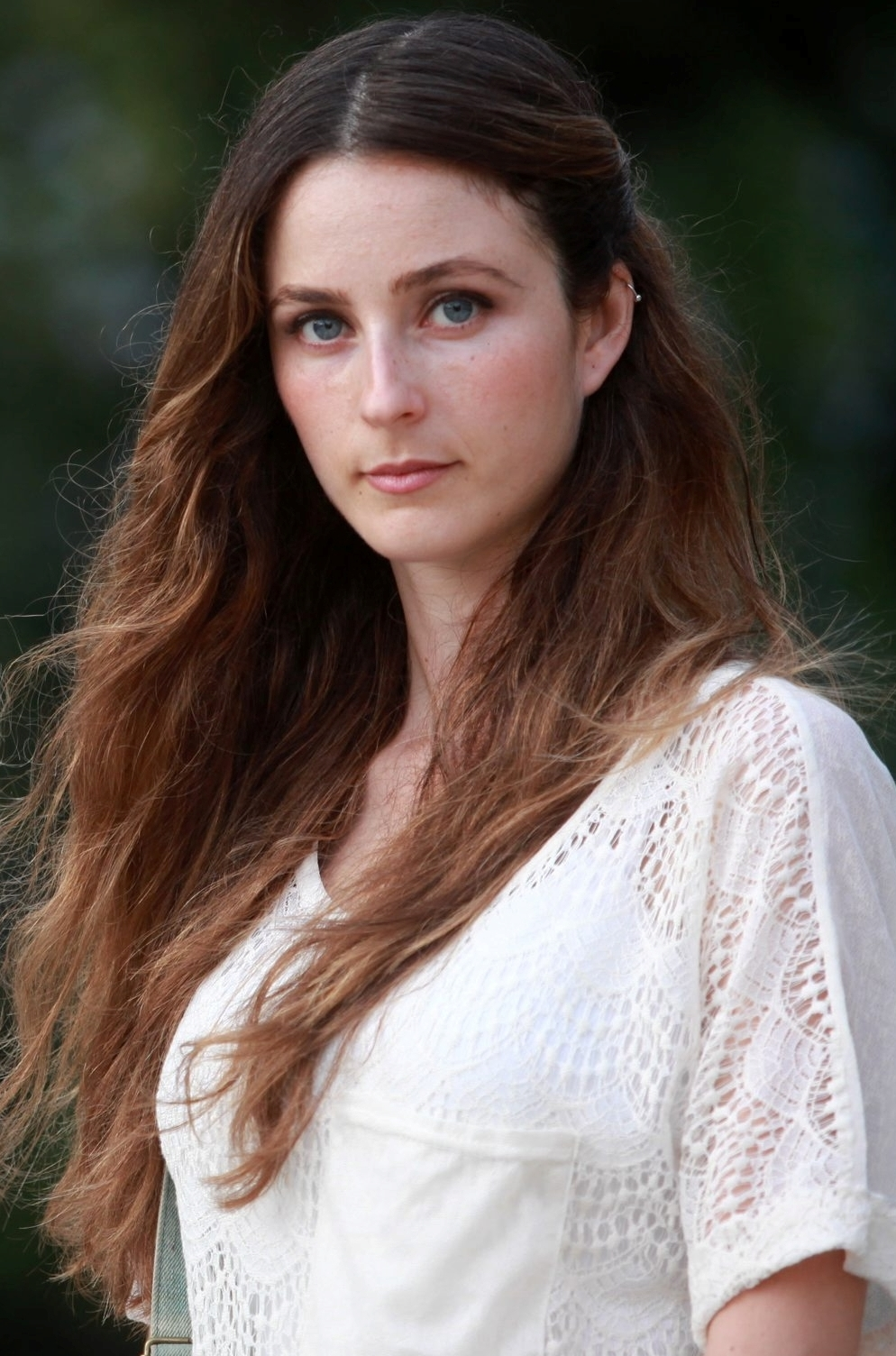
Meirav Cohen

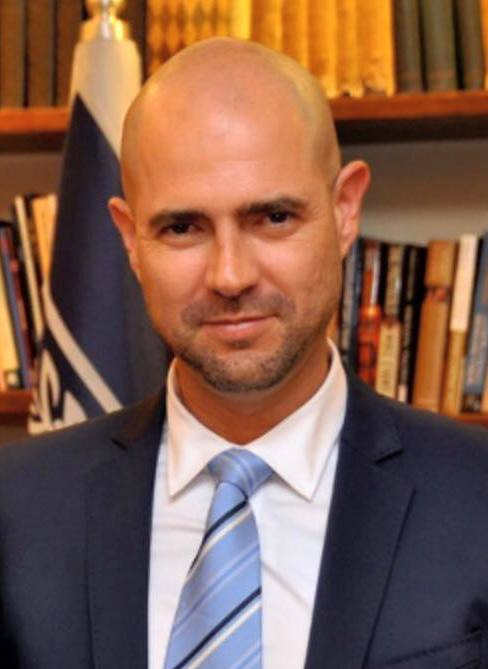
Amir Ohana

- Golda Meir – female prime minister of Israel (1969–74)
- Benjamin Netanyahu – prime minister of Israel (1996–99), (2009–); right-wing Likud party chairman
- Naftali Bennett – prime minister of Israel (2021–), leader of The Jewish Home party, minister of economy and minister of religious services (2013–present)
- Ehud Barak – prime minister of Israel (1999–2001)
- Menachem Begin – prime minister of Israel (1977–83); Nobel Peace Prize (1978)
- David Ben-Gurion – first Prime Minister of Israel (1948–54, 1955–63)
- Yitzhak Ben-Zvi – first elected/second president President of Israel (1952–63)
- Ehud Olmert – prime minister (2006–09); former mayor of Jerusalem
- Yossi Beilin – leader of the Meretz-Yachad party and peace negotiator
- Geula Cohen – politician, activist and "Israel Prize" recipient
- Abba Eban – diplomat and Foreign Affairs Minister of Israel (1966–74)
- Yuli-Yoel Edelstein – speaker of the Knesset
- Uzi Eilam – ex-director of Israel's Atomic Energy Commission
- Effie Eitam – former leader of the National Religious Party, now head of the Renewed Religious National Zionist party
- Levi Eshkol – prime minister of Israel (1963–69)
- Chaim Herzog – former president of Israel, first and only Irish-born Israeli President
- Moshe Katsav – president (2000–07), and convicted rapist
- Teddy Kollek – former mayor of Jerusalem
- Pnina Tamano-Shata – Current Member of Knesset for National Unity (Israel)
- Yair Lapid – leader of the Yesh Atid party, minister of finance (2013–March 2015) and minister of foreign affairs
- Yosef Lapid – former leader of the Shinui party
- Amir Ohana – first openly gay right-wing (Likud) member of the Knesset and former minister of justice
- Shimon Peres – President of Israel (2007–2014); prime minister of Israel (1984–86, 1995–96); Nobel Peace Prize (1994)
- Yitzhak Rabin – prime minister of Israel (1974–77, 1992–95); Nobel Peace Prize (1994) (assassinated November 1995)
- Reuven Rivlin – President of Israel
- Ayelet Shaked – Knesset parliament right-wing member (2013–) and minister (2015–)
- Yitzhak Shamir – prime minister of Israel (1983–84, 1986–92)
- Yisrael Yeshayahu Sharabi – former speaker of the Knesset
- Moshe Sharett – prime minister of Israel (1954–55)
- Ariel Sharon – prime minister of Israel (2001–06)
- Ahmad Tibi - Leader of the Ta'al party
- Chaim Weizmann – first President of Israel (1949–52)
- Ovadia Yosef – spiritual leader of the Shas party
- Rehavam Zeevi – founder of the Moledet party, Knesset parliament member and minister (assassinated by Palestinians in October 2001)
- Meirav Cohen – minister for social equality and Knesset parliament member (2019–)

== Religious figures ==
=== Haredi rabbis ===
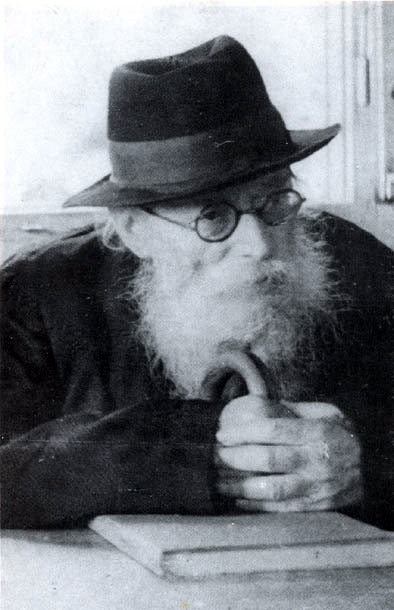
Avraham Yeshayeh Karelitz

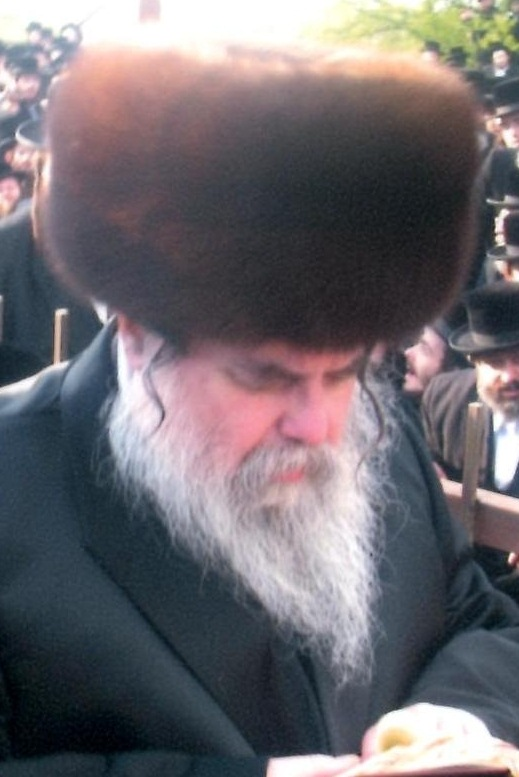
Yissachar Dov Rokeach

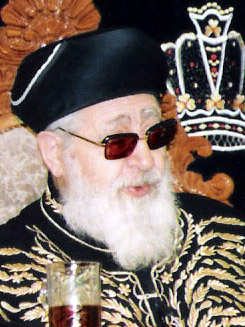
Ovadia Yosef

- Yaakov Aryeh Alter Gerrer – Rebbe
- Shlomo Zalman Auerbach
- Yaakov Blau
- Yisroel Moshe Dushinsky – Chief Rabbi of Jerusalem (Edah HaChareidis)
- Yosef Tzvi Dushinsky – Chief Rabbi of Jerusalem (Edah HaChareidis)
- Yosef Sholom Eliashiv
- Mordechai Eliyahu – Sephardi Chief Rabbi of Israel 1983–93, (1929–2010)
- Chaim Kanievsky
- Avraham Yeshayeh Karelitz, Chazon Ish – (1878–1953)
- Nissim Karelitz – Head Justice of Rabbinical Court of Bnei Brak
- Meir Kessler – Chief Rabbi of Modi'in Illit
- Zundel Kroizer – author of Ohr Hachamah
- Dov Landau – rosh yeshiva of Slabodka yeshiva of Bnei Brak
- Yissachar Dov Rokeach – the fifth Belzer rebbe
- Yitzchok Scheiner – rosh yeshiva of Kamenitz yeshiva of Jerusalem
- Elazar Menachem Shach, Rav Shach – (1899–2001)
- Moshe Shmuel Shapira – rosh yeshiva of Be'er Ya'akov
- Dovid Shmidel – Chairman of Asra Kadisha
- Yitzchok Tuvia Weiss – Chief Rabbi of Jerusalem (Edah HaChareidis)
- Amram Zaks – rosh yeshiva of the Slabodka yeshiva of Bnei Brak
- Ovadia Yosef

=== Reform rabbis ===
- Gilad Kariv

=== Religious-Zionist rabbis ===
- Shlomo Amar – Sephardic Chief Rabbi of Israel
- David Hartman
- Israel Meir Lau – Ashkenazic Chief Rabbi of Israel (1993–2003), Chief Rabbi of Netanya (1978–88), (1937–)
- Aharon Lichtenstein
- Yona Metzger – Ashkenazic Chief Rabbi of Israel
- Shlomo Riskin – Ashkenazic Chief Rabbi of Efrat

== Other ==
- Yigal Amir – assassin of left-wing prime minister Yitzhak Rabin
- Baruch Goldstein – murderer
- Ami Popper – murderer
- Eden-Nathan Zada – murderer
- Margalit Zinati – descendant of an ancient Jewish family from the Second Temple period

== See also ==
- List of Israeli Nobel laureates
- List of Israel Prize recipients
- List of people by nationality
- Politics of Israel, List of Knesset members
- Culture of Israel, Music of Israel
- Science and technology in Israel
- List of Hebrew language authors, poets and playwrights
- List of Israeli Arab Muslims
- List of Dutch Israelis
- List of Israeli Druze
- List of notable Ethiopian Jews in Israel
- List of people from Jerusalem
- List of people from Haifa

== Related links ==
- Presidents of Israel
- Prime Ministers of Israel
