= Amitabha (disambiguation) =

Amitabh or Amitabha or Amitav may refer to:

- Amitābha, an important Buddha in Buddhism
  - Amitābha Buddha from Hancui, a statue from Hancui, China, now in the British Museum
  - Amitabha Buddhist Centre, Singapore
- Amitav Acharya (born 1962), Indian-Canadian scholar and author
- Amitabh Aurora, Indian filmmaker
- Amitabh Bachchan (born 1942), Indian actor in Hindi cinema
- Amitabh Bagchi, Indian Maoist
- Amitabh Bajpai, Indian politician
- Amitav Banerji (born 1926), Indian judge
- Amitabh Bhattacharjee (born 1973), Indian actor
- Amitabh Bhattacharya, Indian lyricist
- Amitabha Bhattacharyya (1931–1992), Indian production engineer
- Amitabha Bose, Indian-American government official
- Amitabh Chandra, Indian economist
- Amitabha Chattopadhyay, Indian molecular biologist
- Amitabh Chaudhry (born 1964/65), Indian banker, CEO and MD of Axis Bank
- Amitabha Chowdhury, Indian journalist
- Amitabh Joshi (born 1965), Indian biologist
- Amitabh Mattoo, Indian academic
- Amitabh Mitra, Indian-South African poet
- Amitabha Ghosh (disambiguation)
- Amitabh Kant, Indian official
- Amitav Mallik, Indian technologist
- Amitabha Mukhopadhyay (born 1959), Indian biologist
- Amitabh Rajan, Indian banker
- Amitabh Shukla, Indian film editor
- Amitabh Singh, Indian space scientist
- Amitabha Singh, Indian cinematographer
- Amitabh Thakur, Indian politician
- Amitabh Varshney, Indian-American computer scientist
- Amitabha (bird), an Eocene fossil bird

== See also ==
- Amit (disambiguation), nickname from the Indian male given name
- Amida (disambiguation), Japanese transliteration
