= Amit =

Male given name of Indian or Hebrew origin

- Pronunciation: Amit
- Gender: Male; Female
- Language: Sanskrit, Hindi, Marathi, Hebrew, Bengali, Punjabi, Bhojpuri, Puyuma, Maithili

Origin
- Meaning: Limitless, friend

Amit is a Hindu and Jewish given name and a Jewish surname.

In Hindi, Amit (Hindi: अमित, means "infinite" or "boundless", Bengali: অমিত) originates from the Sanskrit word amita (अमित:), amita (अमित:) essentially is the negation of mita (मित), which means "to measure".

In Hebrew, Amit (Hebrew: עמית) means "friend", "colleague", "peer", or "member of the organization". It is among the most popular names given to Jewish boys in Israel.

== Given name ==
- Amit Behl (born 1955), Indian television actor
- Amit Singh Bakshi (1925–2024), Indian hockey player
- Amit Bhadana (born 1994), Indian comedy YouTuber
- Amit Sharma (disambiguation), multiple people
- Amit Chaudhuri (born 1962), Indian novelist, poet, essayist, literary critic, editor, singer and music composer
- Amit Kumar Dahiya (born 1993), Indian wrestler, 2020 Olympic Silver Medalist
- Amit Deshmukh (born 1976), Indian politician and minister in state Government of Maharashtra
- Amit Elor (born 2004), American freestyle wrestler, 2024 Olympic champion and 8x world champion
- Amit Farkash (born 1976), Canadian-born Israeli actress and singer
- Amit Gershon (born 1995), Israeli basketball player
- Amit Inbar (born 1972), Israeli Olympic competitive windsurfer, and kitesurfer
- Amit Ivry (born 1989), Israeli Olympic swimmer and national record holder
- Amit Kilam, drummer of Indian Ocean, a contemporary Indian fusion music band
- Amit Kulilay (born 1972), birth name of Taiwanese singer A-mei
- Amit Kumar (disambiguation), several people
- Amit Lang (born 1970), Israeli judoka
- Amit Madheshiya, Indian photographer and filmmaker
- Amit Mehta (born 1971), United States district judge
- Amit Mishra (born 1982), Indian cricketer
- Amit Mishra (singer) (born 1989), Indian singer and songwriter
- Amit Nimade (born 1976), Indian photographer
- Amit Patel, Indian-American cardiac surgeon
- Amit Pathak (born 1972), Indian cricketer
- Amit Rahav (born 1995), Israeli actor
- Amit Sebastian Paul (born 1983), member of the Swedish pop group A*Teens
- Amit Rai, Indian film director
- Amit Saar (1978–2026), Israeli intelligence officer
- Amit Sadh (born 1979), Indian actor
- Amit Sana (born 1983), India singer who finished second in the 2005 Indian Idol contest
- Amit Sarin, Indian television actor
- Amit Shah (born 1964), Indian politician and the current minister of Home affairs, Government of India
- Amit Sharma (cricketer) (born 1966), Indian cricketer
- Amit Shukla (born 1985), Kenyan male cricketer
- Amit Ben Shushan (born 1985), Israeli football player
- Amit Simhon (born 1989), Israeli basketball player
- Amit Singh (cricketer) (born 1981), Indian cricketer
- Amit Singhal (born 1968), senior vice president and software engineer at Google
- Amit Tamir (born 1979), Israeli basketball player
- Amit Trivedi (born 1979), Indian film music director and singer
- Amith Thenuka Vidanagamage (born 1973), Sri Lankan politician
- Amit Yadav (born 1989), Indian cricketer
- Amit Singh (scientist), Indian microbiologist
- Amitabh Bachchan (born 1942), Indian film actor, also known by his nickname Amit

== Surname ==
- Iftach Ian Amit, Israeli computer security professional
- Daniel Amit (1938–2007), Israeli physicist and pacifist
- Galila Ron-Feder Amit (born 1949), Israeli children's books author
- Meir Amit (1921–2009), Israeli politician and general
- Uri Amit (1934–2011), Israeli politician
- Yitzhak Amit (born 1958), judge on the Israeli Supreme Court

== See also ==
- Ameet
- Amita, feminine form
