= Amida =

Amida can mean :

== Places and jurisdictions ==
- Amida (Mesopotamia), now Diyarbakır, an ancient city in Asian Turkey; it is (nominal) seat of:
  - The Chaldean Catholic Archeparchy of Amida
  - The Latin titular Metropolitan see of Amida of the Romans
  - The Armenian Catholic titular see Amida of the Armenians
  - The Syrian Catholic (Antiochian Rite) titular Metropolitan see Amida of the Syriacs
- Mount Amida, mountain in Saeki-ku, Hiroshima, Japan

== Other ==
- Amida Butsu, Amitābha Buddha in Japanese
- Amida (beetle), a beetle genus
- Amida, a ladder climbing puzzle video game

== See also ==
- Amitabha (disambiguation)
- Amidah, the central prayer of Jewish worship
- Amidakuji, a way of drawing lots
- Aëtius of Amida, 6th century medical writer
