= Amit (disambiguation) =

Amit is a Hindu and Jewish given name and a Jewish surname.

Amit may also refer to:

- AMIT, an American Jewish Zionist volunteer organization
- Amit (album), album by Taiwanese recording artist A-Mei

== See also ==
- Ammit
- Ameet
- Amita
