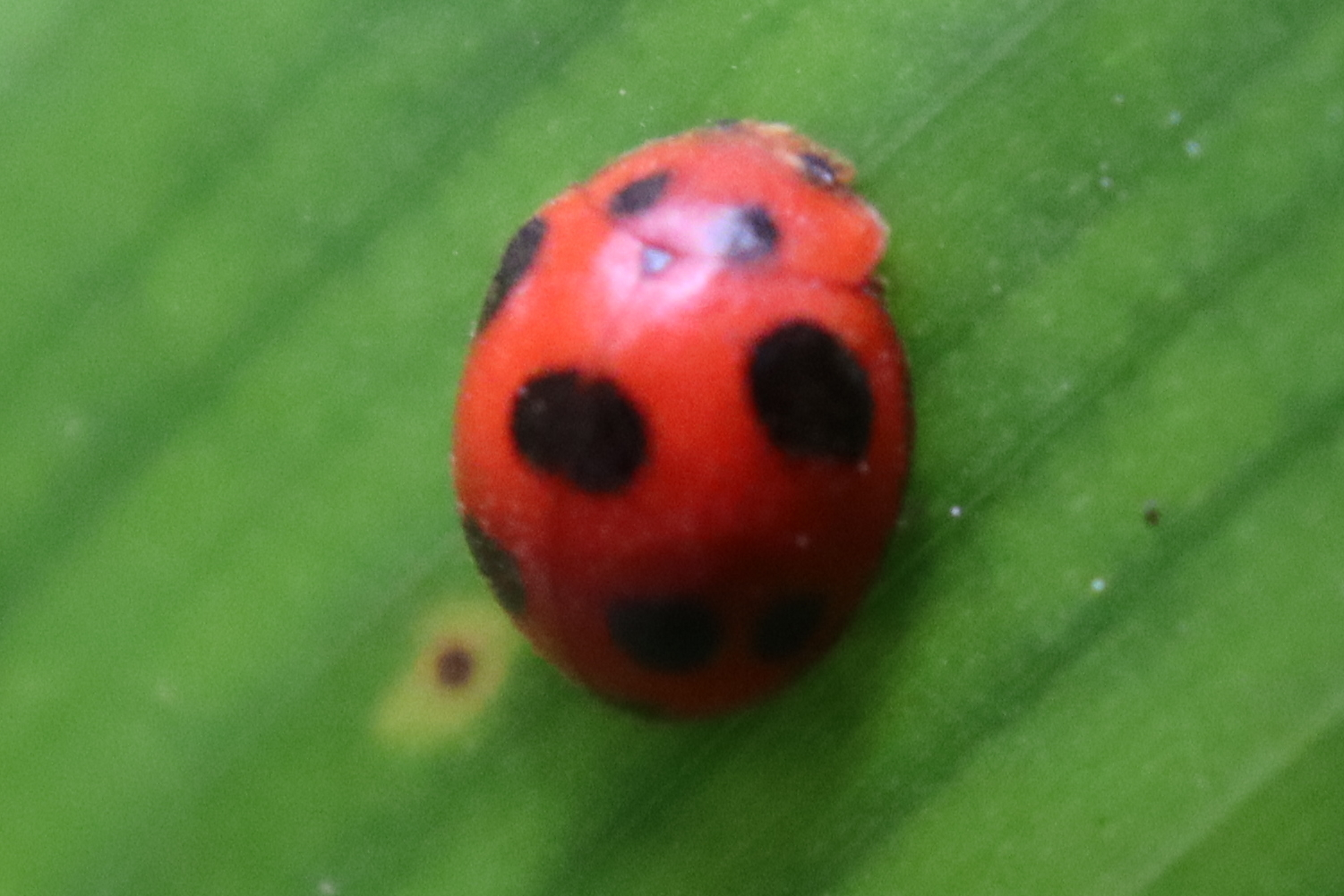
- Exoplectra miniata

Scientific classification
- Kingdom: Animalia
- Phylum: Arthropoda
- Clade: Pancrustacea
- Class: Insecta
- Order: Coleoptera
- Suborder: Polyphaga
- Infraorder: Cucujiformia
- Family: Coccinellidae
- Tribe: Coccidulini
- Genus: Exoplectra; Chevrolat in Dejean, 1837

= Exoplectra =

Genus of beetles

Exoplectra is a genus of lady beetles in the family Coccinellidae.

== Species ==
These species belong to the genus Exoplectra:

- Exoplectra aenea Fabricius, 1801
- Exoplectra amazonica
- Exoplectra angularis Mulsant, 1850
- Exoplectra angustifrons
- Exoplectra batesii
- Exoplectra bimaculata
- Exoplectra brasiliensis
- Exoplectra bruchi
- Exoplectra calcarata (Germar, 1824)
- Exoplectra coccinea (Fabricius, 1801)
- Exoplectra columba
- Exoplectra companyoi
- Exoplectra consentanea
- Exoplectra cruentipes
- Exoplectra drakei
- Exoplectra dubia
- Exoplectra fastidiosa
- Exoplectra ferruginea
- Exoplectra fryii Crotch, 1874
- Exoplectra fulgurata
- Exoplectra funebris
- Exoplectra gorhami
- Exoplectra heydeni
- Exoplectra impotens
- Exoplectra luciae Churata & Basílio, 2026
- Exoplectra metallescens
- Exoplectra miniata Germar, 1824
- Exoplectra misahualli
- Exoplectra ruberrima
- Exoplectra rubicunda Mulsant, 1850
- Exoplectra santaremae
- Exoplectra schaefferi Gordon, 1985 (Schaeffer's lady beetle)
- Exoplectra spatularis
- Exoplectra stevensi
- Exoplectra subaenescens
- tibialis

== Selected former species ==
- Exoplectra irregularis
