= Zenoria patula =

Scientific classification
- Kingdom: Animalia
- Phylum: Arthropoda
- Clade: Pancrustacea
- Class: Insecta
- Order: Coleoptera
- Suborder: Polyphaga
- Infraorder: Cucujiformia
- Family: Coccinellidae
- Genus: Zenoria
- Species: Z. patula

Binomial name
- Zenoria patula Gordon, 1971

Species of beetle

Zenoria patula is a species of beetle of the family Coccinellidae. It is found in Brazil.

== Description ==
Adults reach a length of about 3.90 mm. Adults are very similar to Zenoria serva, but the black area on the pronotum does not extend to the posterolateral angles.
