= Zenoria annularis =

Scientific classification
- Kingdom: Animalia
- Phylum: Arthropoda
- Clade: Pancrustacea
- Class: Insecta
- Order: Coleoptera
- Suborder: Polyphaga
- Infraorder: Cucujiformia
- Family: Coccinellidae
- Genus: Zenoria
- Species: Z. annularis

Binomial name
- Zenoria annularis Gordon, 1971

Species of beetle

Zenoria annularis is a species of beetle of the family Coccinellidae. It is found in Brazil.

== Description ==
Adults reach a length of about 3.40–3.55 mm. Adults are similar to Zenoria crotchi, but the metallic green spot on the elytral disc is slightly larger.
