= Zenoria delicatula =

Scientific classification
- Kingdom: Animalia
- Phylum: Arthropoda
- Clade: Pancrustacea
- Class: Insecta
- Order: Coleoptera
- Suborder: Polyphaga
- Infraorder: Cucujiformia
- Family: Coccinellidae
- Genus: Zenoria
- Species: Z. delicatula

Binomial name
- Zenoria delicatula Weise, 1911

Species of beetle

Zenoria delicatula is a species of beetle of the family Coccinellidae. It is found in Brazil.

== Description ==
Adults reach a length of about 4 mm. Adults are similar to Zenoria discoidalis.
