= Amitabha Ghosh =

Amitabha Ghosh may refer to:

- Amitabha Ghosh (planetary geologist), Indian planetary geologist
- Amitabha Ghosh (academic, born 1941), Indian researcher, administrator and educator
- Amitav Ghosh (born 1956), Indian writer
- Amitav Ghosh (banker) (1930–2020), Indian banker
