= Zenoria rodolioides =

Scientific classification
- Kingdom: Animalia
- Phylum: Arthropoda
- Clade: Pancrustacea
- Class: Insecta
- Order: Coleoptera
- Suborder: Polyphaga
- Infraorder: Cucujiformia
- Family: Coccinellidae
- Genus: Zenoria
- Species: Z. rodolioides

Binomial name
- Zenoria rodolioides Crotch, 1874

Species of beetle

Zenoria rodolioides is a species of beetle of the family Coccinellidae. It is found in Brazil.

== Description ==
Adults reach a length of about 4.05 mm. Adults are yellowish red, while the pronotum, head and legs are yellow. The pronotum and elytron are covered with greyish white hairs.
