= Zenoria circumcincta =

Scientific classification
- Kingdom: Animalia
- Phylum: Arthropoda
- Clade: Pancrustacea
- Class: Insecta
- Order: Coleoptera
- Suborder: Polyphaga
- Infraorder: Cucujiformia
- Family: Coccinellidae
- Genus: Zenoria
- Species: Z. circumcincta

Binomial name
- Zenoria circumcincta Gordon, 1971

Species of beetle

Zenoria circumcincta is a species of beetle of the family Coccinellidae. It is found in Brazil.

== Description ==
Adults reach a length of about 3.45 mm. Adults are pale yellow. The elytron has a large black spot and a large yellowish red spot. The pronotum has some yellowish white hairs, while the elytron is covered with them.
