= SafeBreach =

- Type: Private
- Industry: Cybersecurity
- Founded: 2014; 12 years ago in Tel Aviv, Israel
- Founder: Guy Bejerano; Itzik Kotler
- Headquarters: Sunnyvale, CA
- Area served: Worldwide
- Key people: Guy Bejerano (CEO); Itzik Kotler (CTO)
- Website: safebreach.com

SafeBreach is a cybersecurity company that develops breach and attack simulation (BAS) and continuous security validation platform. It is based in Sunnyvale, California. It was founded in 2014 in Tel Aviv, Israel.

== History ==
SafeBreach was founded in September 2014 by Guy Bejerano and Itzik Kotler in Tel Aviv. Prior to founding the company, Bejerano had worked as a chief information security officer and Kotler had spent time in the Israel Defense Force's technology unit as a hacker.

In July 2015, SafeBreach raised $4 million in seed funding from an investor group led by angel investor, Shlomo Kramer, and Sequoia Capital.

In July 2016, SafeBreach raised an additional $15 million in Series A funding from existing investors along with participation from Hewlett-Packard Enterprise, Deutsche Telekom, and Maverick Ventures. In May 2018, SafeBreach raised $15 million in Series B funding led by Draper Nexus (later known as DNX Ventures), with participation from PayPal and existing investors Sequoia Capital, Deutsche Telekom Capital Partners and HPE Pathfinder.

In April 2020, SafeBreach raised an additional $19 million in Series C funding from six investors. It is funded by Sequoia Capital, Hewlett-Packard, Deutsche Telekom Capital Partners and others.

In November 2021, SafeBreach received $53.5 million in a Series D funding round led by Sonae IM and Israel Growth Partners (IGP).

== Products ==
SafeBreach has developed a platform that simulates hacker breach methods, running continuous "war games" to identify breach scenarios across network systems. The platform simulates hacker breach methods such as brute force, exploits, and malware. Using a library of hacker breach methods called the "Hacker's Playbook," SafeBreach develops potential breach scenarios specific to a client's environment and runs simulations to identify whether or not the security defenses that are in place can defend itself. There are thousands of different possible breach scenarios depending on a client's unique network setup.
