= Zenoria =

Scientific classification
- Kingdom: Animalia
- Phylum: Arthropoda
- Clade: Pancrustacea
- Class: Insecta
- Order: Coleoptera
- Suborder: Polyphaga
- Infraorder: Cucujiformia
- Family: Coccinellidae
- Subfamily: Coccinellinae
- Tribe: Ortaliini
- Genus: Zenoria; Mulsant, 1850

Genus of beetles

Zenoria is a genus of beetles in the family Coccinellidae.

== Species ==
- Zenoria annularis
- Zenoria carbo
- Zenoria carinata
- Zenoria circumcincta
- Zenoria crotchi
- Zenoria delicatula
- Zenoria discoidalis
- Zenoria dozieri
- Zenoria emarginata
- Zenoria flavicollis
- Zenoria formosa
- Zenoria gordoni
- Zenoria irregularis
- Zenoria lativerpa
- Zenoria limitrophi
- Zenoria linteolata
- Zenoria luciae
- Zenoria major
- Zenoria miroi
- Zenoria nigra
- Zenoria nigricollis
- Zenoria pallida
- Zenoria paprzyckii
- Zenoria patula
- Zenoria pilosula
- Zenoria purpurea
- Zenoria ratzeburgi
- Zenoria revestita
- Zenoria roberti
- Zenoria rodolioides
- Zenoria schwarzi
- Zenoria serva
- Zenoria similaris
- Zenoria stellaris
- Zenoria subcostalis
- Zenoria sylvatica
- Zenoria tricolor
- Zenoria variabilis
- Zenoria westerduijni
