= Zenoria tricolor =

Scientific classification
- Kingdom: Animalia
- Phylum: Arthropoda
- Clade: Pancrustacea
- Class: Insecta
- Order: Coleoptera
- Suborder: Polyphaga
- Infraorder: Cucujiformia
- Family: Coccinellidae
- Genus: Zenoria
- Species: Z. tricolor

Binomial name
- Zenoria tricolor Nunenmacher, 1944

Species of beetle

Zenoria tricolor is a species of beetle of the family Coccinellidae. It is found in Peru.

== Description ==
Adults reach a length of about 2.90–3 mm. Adults are pale yellow. There is a black median projection on the pronotum and the elytron has a large black spot and a small circular brick-red spot in the centre of the black spot. The pronotum has some yellowish white hairs, while the elytron is covered with them.
