= Zenoria major =

Scientific classification
- Kingdom: Animalia
- Phylum: Arthropoda
- Clade: Pancrustacea
- Class: Insecta
- Order: Coleoptera
- Suborder: Polyphaga
- Infraorder: Cucujiformia
- Family: Coccinellidae
- Genus: Zenoria
- Species: Z. major

Binomial name
- Zenoria major Crotch, 1874

Species of beetle

Zenoria major is a species of beetle of the family Coccinellidae. It is found in Brazil.

== Description ==
Adults reach a length of about 4.30–4.75 mm. Adults are pale yellow, while the anterior margin of the pronotum is black and the elytron is dark metallic green. Both the pronotum and elytron are covered with greyish white hairs.
