= Zenoria nigra =

Scientific classification
- Kingdom: Animalia
- Phylum: Arthropoda
- Clade: Pancrustacea
- Class: Insecta
- Order: Coleoptera
- Suborder: Polyphaga
- Infraorder: Cucujiformia
- Family: Coccinellidae
- Genus: Zenoria
- Species: Z. nigra

Binomial name
- Zenoria nigra Gordon, 1971

Species of beetle

Zenoria nigra is a species of beetle of the family Coccinellidae. It is found in Panama.

== Description ==
Adults reach a length of about 3.28–3.32 mm. Adults are black with a yellow head. The pronotum is yellow with a black basal median area. The discal area of the elytron is shiny black without hairs. Both the pronotum and the remainder of the elytron are covered with greyish white hairs.
