= Zenoria carinata =

Scientific classification
- Kingdom: Animalia
- Phylum: Arthropoda
- Clade: Pancrustacea
- Class: Insecta
- Order: Coleoptera
- Suborder: Polyphaga
- Infraorder: Cucujiformia
- Family: Coccinellidae
- Genus: Zenoria
- Species: Z. carinata

Binomial name
- Zenoria carinata Gordon, 1971

Species of beetle

Zenoria carinata is a species of beetle of the family Coccinellidae. It is found in Suriname.

== Description ==
Adults reach a length of about 4 mm. Adults are black, while the anterior margin of the pronotum is yellow and the elytron is dark metallic green. Both the pronotum and elytron are covered with greyish white hairs.
