= Zenoria schwarzi =

Scientific classification
- Kingdom: Animalia
- Phylum: Arthropoda
- Clade: Pancrustacea
- Class: Insecta
- Order: Coleoptera
- Suborder: Polyphaga
- Infraorder: Cucujiformia
- Family: Coccinellidae
- Genus: Zenoria
- Species: Z. schwarzi

Binomial name
- Zenoria schwarzi Gordon, 1971

Species of beetle

Zenoria schwarzi is a species of beetle of the family Coccinellidae. It is found in Panama.

== Description ==
Adults reach a length of about 2.95–3.10 mm. Adults are pale yellow. The pronotum has a black median basal projection and the elytron has a large dark metallic green spot, as well as a small oval dark red spot in the centre of the green spot. The pronotum has some yellowish white hairs, while the elytron is covered with them.
