= Zenoria luciae =

Scientific classification
- Kingdom: Animalia
- Phylum: Arthropoda
- Clade: Pancrustacea
- Class: Insecta
- Order: Coleoptera
- Suborder: Polyphaga
- Infraorder: Cucujiformia
- Family: Coccinellidae
- Genus: Zenoria
- Species: Z. luciae

Binomial name
- Zenoria luciae González & Honour, 2012

Species of beetle

Zenoria luciae is a species of beetle of the family Coccinellidae. It is found in Brazil.

== Description ==
Adults reach a length of about 3.3–3.5 mm. Adults are straw yellow with a large round black spot on the disc of the elytron.
