= Pseudoladoria =

Scientific classification
- Kingdom: Animalia
- Phylum: Arthropoda
- Class: Insecta
- Order: Coleoptera
- Suborder: Polyphaga
- Infraorder: Cucujiformia
- Family: Coccinellidae
- Subfamily: Coccinellinae
- Tribe: Ortaliini
- Genus: Pseudoladoria; Crotch, 1874

Genus of beetles

Pseudoladoria is a genus of beetles in the family Coccinellidae.

== Species ==
- Pseudoladoria simulans Crotch, 1874
