= Zenoria roberti =

Scientific classification
- Kingdom: Animalia
- Phylum: Arthropoda
- Clade: Pancrustacea
- Class: Insecta
- Order: Coleoptera
- Suborder: Polyphaga
- Infraorder: Cucujiformia
- Family: Coccinellidae
- Genus: Zenoria
- Species: Z. roberti

Binomial name
- Zenoria roberti Almeida, 1995

Species of beetle

Zenoria roberti is a species of beetle of the family Coccinellidae. It is found in Brazil.

== Description ==
Adults reach a length of about 3.50-4 mm. Adults are black and covered with greyish white hairs. The anterior margin of the pronotum and the head are pale yellow and the elytron has a round discal spot consisting of black hairs.
