= Zenoria dozieri =

Scientific classification
- Kingdom: Animalia
- Phylum: Arthropoda
- Clade: Pancrustacea
- Class: Insecta
- Order: Coleoptera
- Suborder: Polyphaga
- Infraorder: Cucujiformia
- Family: Coccinellidae
- Genus: Zenoria
- Species: Z. dozieri

Binomial name
- Zenoria dozieri Gordon, 1972

Species of beetle

Zenoria dozieri is a species of beetle of the family Coccinellidae. It is found in Peru.

== Description ==
Adults reach a length of about 3.90 mm. Adults are black, but the anterior and anterolateral angle of the pronotum and the head are yellow. The elytron is black with a discal spot consisting of dark brown hairs. The lateral one-fourth has a metallic bronze and green lustre. Both the pronotum and elytron are covered with greyish white hairs.
