= Zenoria purpurea =

Scientific classification
- Kingdom: Animalia
- Phylum: Arthropoda
- Clade: Pancrustacea
- Class: Insecta
- Order: Coleoptera
- Suborder: Polyphaga
- Infraorder: Cucujiformia
- Family: Coccinellidae
- Genus: Zenoria
- Species: Z. purpurea

Binomial name
- Zenoria purpurea Gordon, 1972

Species of beetle

Zenoria purpurea is a species of beetle of the family Coccinellidae. It is found in Peru.

== Description ==
Adults reach a length of about 3.36 mm. Adults are yellow. The pronotum is black with a yellow lateral and anterior margin and the elytron is dark metallic purple. There are greyish white hairs on the pronotum and elytron.
