= Rhynchortalia =

Scientific classification
- Kingdom: Animalia
- Phylum: Arthropoda
- Class: Insecta
- Order: Coleoptera
- Suborder: Polyphaga
- Infraorder: Cucujiformia
- Family: Coccinellidae
- Subfamily: Coccinellinae
- Tribe: Ortaliini
- Genus: Rhynchortalia; Crotch, 1874

Genus of beetles

Rhynchortalia is a genus of beetles in the family Coccinellidae.

== Species ==
- Rhynchortalia anupama Poorani & Ślipiński, 2010
- Rhynchortalia australis Poorani & Ślipiński, 2010
- Rhynchortalia iba Poorani & Ślipiński, 2010
- Rhynchortalia insueta Crotch, 1874
- Rhynchortalia iongai Poorani & Ślipiński, 2010
- Rhynchortalia moresby Poorani & Ślipiński, 2010
- Rhynchortalia papuana Poorani & Ślipiński, 2010
- Rhynchortalia purpurea Poorani & Ślipiński, 2010
- Rhynchortalia riedeli Poorani & Ślipiński, 2010
- Rhynchortalia similis Poorani & Ślipiński, 2010
- Rhynchortalia viridis Poorani & Ślipiński, 2010
- Rhynchortalia wau Poorani & Ślipiński, 2010
