= Zenoria linteolata =

Scientific classification
- Kingdom: Animalia
- Phylum: Arthropoda
- Clade: Pancrustacea
- Class: Insecta
- Order: Coleoptera
- Suborder: Polyphaga
- Infraorder: Cucujiformia
- Family: Coccinellidae
- Genus: Zenoria
- Species: Z. linteolata

Binomial name
- Zenoria linteolata Mulsant, 1850

Species of beetle

Zenoria linteolata is a species of beetle of the family Coccinellidae. It is found in Brazil and Ecuador.

== Description ==
Adults reach a length of about 3.33 mm. Adults are black with a yellow head. The pronotum is black with the anterior and lateral margins bordered with yellow. The elytron is dark metallic green.
