= Zenoria variabilis =

Scientific classification
- Kingdom: Animalia
- Phylum: Arthropoda
- Clade: Pancrustacea
- Class: Insecta
- Order: Coleoptera
- Suborder: Polyphaga
- Infraorder: Cucujiformia
- Family: Coccinellidae
- Genus: Zenoria
- Species: Z. variabilis

Binomial name
- Zenoria variabilis Gordon, 1971

Species of beetle

Zenoria variabilis is a species of beetle of the family Coccinellidae. It is found in Peru.

== Description ==
Adults reach a length of about 3.85–4 mm. Adults are pale yellowish white. The elytron has a small brown spot. The pronotum has white hairs, while the elytron is covered with them.
