= Zenoria emarginata =

Scientific classification
- Kingdom: Animalia
- Phylum: Arthropoda
- Clade: Pancrustacea
- Class: Insecta
- Order: Coleoptera
- Suborder: Polyphaga
- Infraorder: Cucujiformia
- Family: Coccinellidae
- Genus: Zenoria
- Species: Z. emarginata

Binomial name
- Zenoria emarginata Gordon, 1971

Species of beetle

Zenoria emarginata is a species of beetle of the family Coccinellidae. It is found in Trinidad.

== Description ==
Adults reach a length of about 2.93–3 mm. Adults are pale yellow. There is a black median projection on the pronotum and the elytron is black with a pale yellow outer band. The pronotum has greyish white hairs, while the elytron is covered with them.

== Biology ==
It has been recorded feeding on Asterolecanium species and on Aspidiotus destructor on coconut.
