= Zenoria revestita =

Scientific classification
- Kingdom: Animalia
- Phylum: Arthropoda
- Clade: Pancrustacea
- Class: Insecta
- Order: Coleoptera
- Suborder: Polyphaga
- Infraorder: Cucujiformia
- Family: Coccinellidae
- Genus: Zenoria
- Species: Z. revestita

Binomial name
- Zenoria revestita Mulsant, 1850

Synonyms
- Zenoria linteolata Mulsant, 1850; Ladoria rudepunctata Crotch, 1874

Species of beetle

Zenoria revestita is a species of beetle of the family Coccinellidae. It is found in Brazil.

== Description ==
Adults reach a length of about 3-3.30 mm. Adults are black, with the anterior margin and angles of the pronotum and the head pale yellow. Both the pronotum and elytron are covered with greyish white hairs.
