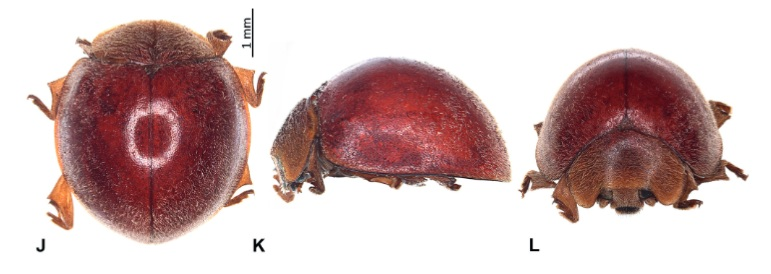

Scientific classification
- Kingdom: Animalia
- Phylum: Arthropoda
- Clade: Pancrustacea
- Class: Insecta
- Order: Coleoptera
- Suborder: Polyphaga
- Infraorder: Cucujiformia
- Family: Coccinellidae
- Genus: Exoplectra
- Species: E. misahualli

Binomial name
- Exoplectra misahualli Szawaryn & Czerwiński, 2022

= Exoplectra misahualli =

Species of beetle

Exoplectra misahualli is a species of beetle of the family Coccinellidae. It is found in Ecuador.

== Description ==
Adults reach a length of about 4.50 mm. The elytron is dark red, while the antennae, head and legs are light brown.

== Etymology ==
The species name is derived from the name of the type locality, Puerto Misahuallí.
