= Zenoria similaris =

Scientific classification
- Kingdom: Animalia
- Phylum: Arthropoda
- Clade: Pancrustacea
- Class: Insecta
- Order: Coleoptera
- Suborder: Polyphaga
- Infraorder: Cucujiformia
- Family: Coccinellidae
- Genus: Zenoria
- Species: Z. similaris

Binomial name
- Zenoria similaris Gordon, 1971

Species of beetle

Zenoria similaris is a species of beetle of the family Coccinellidae. It is found in Colombia and Mexico.

== Description ==
Adults reach a length of about 3.43–3.51 mm. Adults are black, with the anterior and lateral margins of the pronotum and the head yellow. The discal area of the elytron is shiny and black. Both the pronotum and the remainder of the elytron are covered with greyish white hairs.
