= Scymnhova =

Scientific classification
- Kingdom: Animalia
- Phylum: Arthropoda
- Class: Insecta
- Order: Coleoptera
- Suborder: Polyphaga
- Infraorder: Cucujiformia
- Family: Coccinellidae
- Subfamily: Coccinellinae
- Tribe: Ortaliini
- Genus: Scymnhova; Sicard, 1909

Genus of beetles

Scymnhova is a genus of beetles in the family Coccinellidae.

== Species ==
- Scymnhova inornata Sicard, 1931
- Scymnhova ornatipennis Sicard, 1909
- Scymnhova quadriguttata Sicard, 1909
- Scymnhova quadrimaculata Sicard, 1909
