= Zenoria formosa =

Scientific classification
- Kingdom: Animalia
- Phylum: Arthropoda
- Clade: Pancrustacea
- Class: Insecta
- Order: Coleoptera
- Suborder: Polyphaga
- Infraorder: Cucujiformia
- Family: Coccinellidae
- Genus: Zenoria
- Species: Z. formosa

Binomial name
- Zenoria formosa Gordon, 1972

Species of beetle

Zenoria formosa is a species of beetle of the family Coccinellidae. It is found in Colombia.

== Description ==
Adults reach a length of about 3.50 mm. Adults are black with a yellow head. The pronotum is black with yellow anterior and lateral margins and the elytron is dark metallic green with the apical one-tenth yellow. The pronotum is covered with yellowish white hairs.
