= Zenoria nigricollis =

Scientific classification
- Kingdom: Animalia
- Phylum: Arthropoda
- Clade: Pancrustacea
- Class: Insecta
- Order: Coleoptera
- Suborder: Polyphaga
- Infraorder: Cucujiformia
- Family: Coccinellidae
- Genus: Zenoria
- Species: Z. nigricollis

Binomial name
- Zenoria nigricollis Gordon, 1972

Species of beetle

Zenoria nigricollis is a species of beetle of the family Coccinellidae. It is found in Brazil and Guyana.

== Description ==
Adults reach a length of about 3.80 mm. Adults are black, while the anterior and lateral margins of the pronotum and the head are yellow. The elytron is dark metallic green. Both the pronotum and elytron are covered with greyish white hairs.
