= Zenoria ratzeburgi =

Scientific classification
- Kingdom: Animalia
- Phylum: Arthropoda
- Clade: Pancrustacea
- Class: Insecta
- Order: Coleoptera
- Suborder: Polyphaga
- Infraorder: Cucujiformia
- Family: Coccinellidae
- Genus: Zenoria
- Species: Z. ratzeburgi

Binomial name
- Zenoria ratzeburgi Mulsant, 1850

Species of beetle

Zenoria ratzeburgi is a species of beetle of the family Coccinellidae. It is found in Brazil.

== Description ==
Adults reach a length of about 3.33 mm. The pronotum is yellowish white with a black band occupying the median one-fourth of the basal margin. The elytron is greyish white with three black vittae.
