= Zenoria gordoni =

Scientific classification
- Kingdom: Animalia
- Phylum: Arthropoda
- Clade: Pancrustacea
- Class: Insecta
- Order: Coleoptera
- Suborder: Polyphaga
- Infraorder: Cucujiformia
- Family: Coccinellidae
- Genus: Zenoria
- Species: Z. gordoni

Binomial name
- Zenoria gordoni Ukrainsky, 2008

Synonyms
- Zenoria peruviana Gordon, 1972 (preocc.)

Species of beetle

Zenoria gordoni is a species of beetle of the family Coccinellidae. It is found in Peru.

== Description ==
Adults reach a length of about 3.71 mm. Adults are yellow. The pronotum has a black median basal projection and the elytron is dark metallic green with a yellow area along the lateral margin. Both the pronotum and elytron are covered with greyish white hairs.
