= Zenoria carbo =

Scientific classification
- Kingdom: Animalia
- Phylum: Arthropoda
- Clade: Pancrustacea
- Class: Insecta
- Order: Coleoptera
- Suborder: Polyphaga
- Infraorder: Cucujiformia
- Family: Coccinellidae
- Genus: Zenoria
- Species: Z. carbo

Binomial name
- Zenoria carbo Santos & González, 2016

Species of beetle

Zenoria carbo is a species of beetle of the family Coccinellidae. It is found in Peru.

== Description ==
Adults reach a length of about 3.1–3.2 mm. The pronotum has a black basal spot and yellowish white hairs. The elytron is black with yellowish white and dark brown hairs.
