= Ameet =

Ameet is a male given name. Notable people with this name include:

- Ameet Bhaskar Satam, Indian politician
- Ameet Chana (born 1975), Indian actor
- Ameet Ghasi (born 1987), English chess player
- Ameet Mehta, Indian politician
- Ameet Pall (born 1987), Canadian football player
- Ameet Sampat (born 1977), Omani cricket player

== See also ==
- Amit
