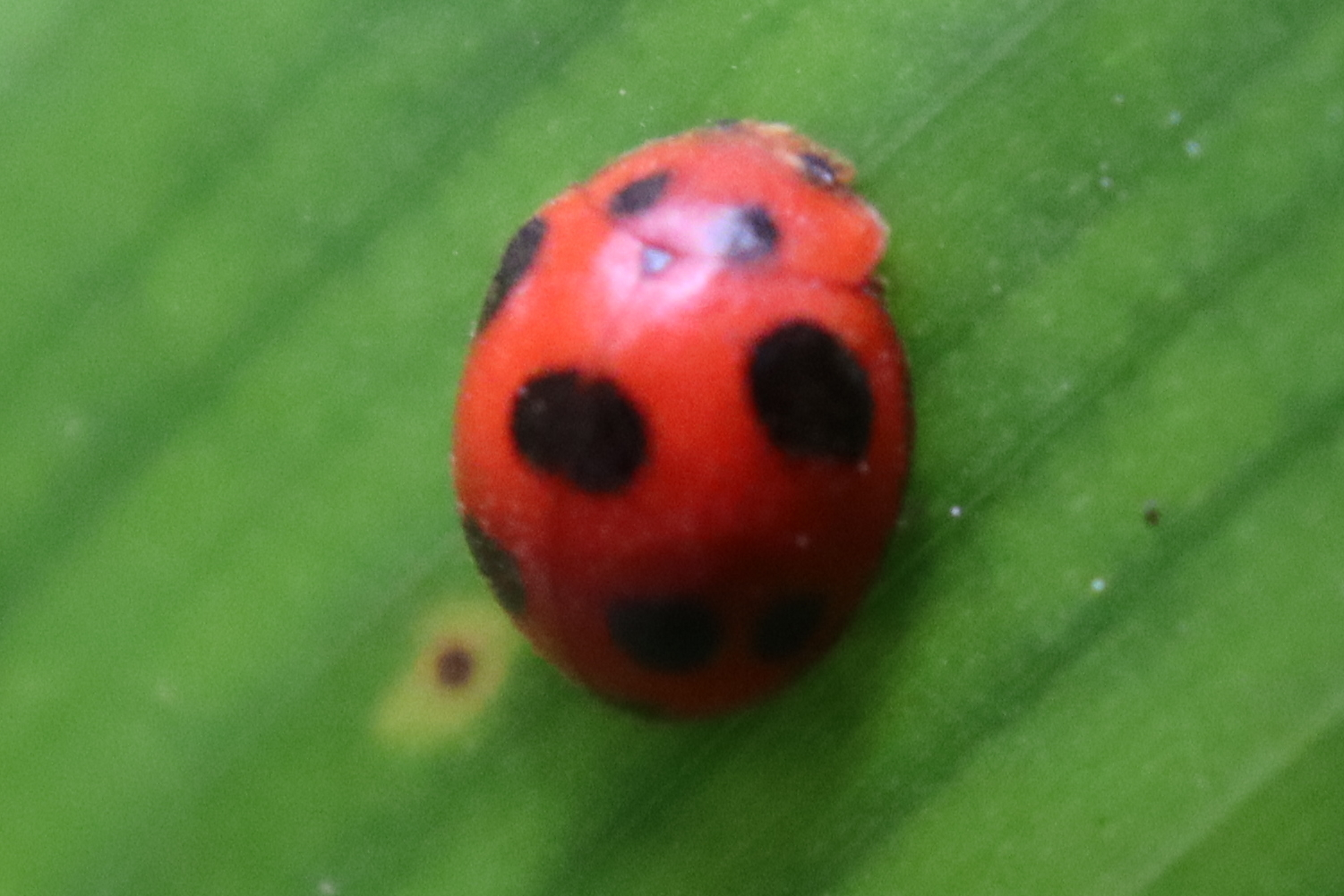

Scientific classification
- Kingdom: Animalia
- Phylum: Arthropoda
- Clade: Pancrustacea
- Class: Insecta
- Order: Coleoptera
- Suborder: Polyphaga
- Infraorder: Cucujiformia
- Family: Coccinellidae
- Genus: Exoplectra
- Species: E. miniata

Binomial name
- Exoplectra miniata (Germar, 1824)

= Exoplectra miniata =

Species of beetle

Exoplectra miniata is a species of coccinelid found in Brazil. It is known to feed on extra-floral nectar of the plant Inga edulis.
