= Zenoria subcostalis =

Scientific classification
- Kingdom: Animalia
- Phylum: Arthropoda
- Clade: Pancrustacea
- Class: Insecta
- Order: Coleoptera
- Suborder: Polyphaga
- Infraorder: Cucujiformia
- Family: Coccinellidae
- Genus: Zenoria
- Species: Z. subcostalis

Binomial name
- Zenoria subcostalis Mulsant, 1850

Species of beetle

Zenoria subcostalis is a species of beetle of the family Coccinellidae. It is found in Colombia.

== Description ==
Adults reach a length of about 3.10–3.30 mm. Adults are reddish yellow, while the pronotum and head are pale yellow. The elytron has a black submarginal vitta.
