= Ortaliini =

Scientific classification
- Kingdom: Animalia
- Phylum: Arthropoda
- Clade: Pancrustacea
- Class: Insecta
- Order: Coleoptera
- Suborder: Polyphaga
- Infraorder: Cucujiformia
- Family: Coccinellidae
- Subfamily: Coccinellinae
- Tribe: Ortaliini; Mulsant, 1850

Tribe of beetles

The Ortaliini are a tribe of insects within the family Coccinellidae.

== Genera ==
- Amida
- Anortalia
- Azoria
- Elnidortalia
- Ortalia
- Ortalistes
- Paramida
- Pseudoladoria
- Rhynchortalia
- Scymnhova
- Zenoria
