= Zenoria sylvatica =

Scientific classification
- Kingdom: Animalia
- Phylum: Arthropoda
- Clade: Pancrustacea
- Class: Insecta
- Order: Coleoptera
- Suborder: Polyphaga
- Infraorder: Cucujiformia
- Family: Coccinellidae
- Genus: Zenoria
- Species: Z. sylvatica

Binomial name
- Zenoria sylvatica González & Honour, 2012

Species of beetle

Zenoria sylvatica is a species of beetle of the family Coccinellidae. It is found in Peru.

== Description ==
Adults reach a length of about 3.5–3.9 mm. Adults are yellow with a round black spot on the disc of the elytron.
