= Exoplectra schaefferi =

Scientific classification
- Kingdom: Animalia
- Phylum: Arthropoda
- Clade: Pancrustacea
- Class: Insecta
- Order: Coleoptera
- Suborder: Polyphaga
- Infraorder: Cucujiformia
- Family: Coccinellidae
- Genus: Exoplectra
- Species: E. schaefferi

Binomial name
- Exoplectra schaefferi Gordon, 1985

Species of beetle

Exoplectra schaefferi, or Schaeffer's lady beetle, is a species of lady beetle in the family Coccinellidae. It is found in Central America and North America, where it has been recorded from Arizona.

== Description ==
Adults reach a length of about 2.75-4.20 mm. They have a yellowish red body, but the head and median three-fourth of the pronotum are black. The elytron is dark brown with a brassy green tint.

== Etymology ==
The name is a patronym for Charles Schaeffer, who collected and described several coccinellids from the southwest US.
