= Zenoria pallida =

Scientific classification
- Kingdom: Animalia
- Phylum: Arthropoda
- Clade: Pancrustacea
- Class: Insecta
- Order: Coleoptera
- Suborder: Polyphaga
- Infraorder: Cucujiformia
- Family: Coccinellidae
- Genus: Zenoria
- Species: Z. pallida

Binomial name
- Zenoria pallida Gordon, 1971

Species of beetle

Zenoria pallida is a species of beetle of the family Coccinellidae. It is found in Brazil.

== Description ==
Adults reach a length of about 3.75–3.90 mm. Adults are pale yellowish white. The pronotum is covered with white hairs and the elytron is covered with yellowish white hairs.
