= Zenoria westerduijni =

Scientific classification
- Kingdom: Animalia
- Phylum: Arthropoda
- Clade: Pancrustacea
- Class: Insecta
- Order: Coleoptera
- Suborder: Polyphaga
- Infraorder: Cucujiformia
- Family: Coccinellidae
- Genus: Zenoria
- Species: Z. westerduijni

Binomial name
- Zenoria westerduijni Santos & González, 2016

Species of beetle

Zenoria westerduijni is a species of beetle of the family Coccinellidae. It is found in Peru.

== Description ==
Adults reach a length of about 4 mm. The pronotum is black with a yellow margin on the anterior border and with greyish white hairs. The elytron is black with light and dark brown hairs.
