= Exoplectra luciae =

Scientific classification
- Kingdom: Animalia
- Phylum: Arthropoda
- Clade: Pancrustacea
- Class: Insecta
- Order: Coleoptera
- Suborder: Polyphaga
- Infraorder: Cucujiformia
- Family: Coccinellidae
- Genus: Exoplectra
- Species: E. luciae

Binomial name
- Exoplectra luciae Churata & Basílio, 2026

Species of beetle

Exoplectra luciae is a species of beetle of the family Coccinellidae. It is found in Peru.

== Description ==
Adults reach a length of about 4.26–4.74 mm (0.168–0.187 in) for males and 4.31 mm (0.170 in) for females. They have a rounded body with thin, short and whitish pubescence. The integument is black with a large red spot on each elytron, leaving only a black border on the outer edge. The head is black, with yellowish, brown or black antennae and mouthparts. The pronotum is black, with a continuous yellow spot throughout the anterior margin. The legs are black.

== Etymology ==
The species is named in honour of the Brazilian entomologist Dr. Lúcia Massutti de Almeida.
