= Amit Sharma =

Amit Sharma may refer to:

- Amit Sharma (cricketer) (born 1974), Indian cricketer
- Amit Sharma (director) (born 1978), Indian director
- Amit Prakash Sharma (born 1968), Indian parasitologist
- Amit Sharma (Emmerdale), fictional character from the British soap opera Emmerdale
