= Zenoria limitrophi =

Scientific classification
- Kingdom: Animalia
- Phylum: Arthropoda
- Clade: Pancrustacea
- Class: Insecta
- Order: Coleoptera
- Suborder: Polyphaga
- Infraorder: Cucujiformia
- Family: Coccinellidae
- Genus: Zenoria
- Species: Z. limitrophi

Binomial name
- Zenoria limitrophi Santos & González, 2016

Species of beetle

Zenoria limitrophi is a species of beetle of the family Coccinellidae. It is found in Brazil.

== Description ==
Adults reach a length of about 3.6–4.1 mm. The elytron is dark metallic green with pale yellow margins and with yellowish white hairs, becoming brown at the discal area.
