= Zenoria stellaris =

Scientific classification
- Kingdom: Animalia
- Phylum: Arthropoda
- Clade: Pancrustacea
- Class: Insecta
- Order: Coleoptera
- Suborder: Polyphaga
- Infraorder: Cucujiformia
- Family: Coccinellidae
- Genus: Zenoria
- Species: Z. stellaris

Binomial name
- Zenoria stellaris (Gorham, 1899)

Synonyms
- Poria stellaris Gorham, 1899; Zenoria discrepa Gordon, 1971

Species of beetle

Zenoria stellaris is a species of beetle of the family Coccinellidae. It is found in Colombia and Panama.

== Description ==
Adults reach a length of about 4.80–4.83 mm. Adults are black, while the anterior and lateral margins of the pronotum and head are yellow. Both the pronotum and elytron are covered with greyish white hairs.
