= Zenoria paprzyckii =

Scientific classification
- Kingdom: Animalia
- Phylum: Arthropoda
- Clade: Pancrustacea
- Class: Insecta
- Order: Coleoptera
- Suborder: Polyphaga
- Infraorder: Cucujiformia
- Family: Coccinellidae
- Genus: Zenoria
- Species: Z. paprzyckii

Binomial name
- Zenoria paprzyckii Gordon, 1971

Species of beetle

Zenoria paprzyckii is a species of beetle of the family Coccinellidae. It is found in Peru.

== Description ==
Adults reach a length of about 4.08–4.22 mm. Adults are black, while the anterior half of the pronotum and head are pale yellow. Both the pronotum and elytron are covered with greyish white hairs.
