= Amita =

Amita is a female given name of Indian origin. The name means "infinite, boundless" in Sanskrit.

== List of people with the given name Amita ==
- Amita, mother of Yasodharā
- Amita Aggarwal (born 1960), Indian immunologist, rheumatologist, and professor
- Amita Berthier (born 2000), Singaporean fencer
- Amita Bhushan (born 1970), Indian politician
- Amita Dhiri (born 1966), English actress
- Amita Kanekar (born 1965), Indian writer
- Amita Kuttner (born 1990), Canadian astrophysicist and politician
- Amita Malik (1921–2009), Indian film critic
- Amita Sehgal, Indian molecular biologist and chronobiologist
- Amita Sharma (born 1982), Indian cricketer
- Amita Suman (born 1997), British-Nepalese actress
- Amita Young (born 1980), Thai singer, actress, and model.

== Fictional characters ==
- Amita Ramanujan, fictional mathematician in the television series Numb3rs
- Amita, fictional character in the video game Far Cry 4

== See also ==
- Amit, a male given name
- Anita (given name)
