= Amitabha Ghosh (planetary geologist) =

Indian planetary geologist

Amitabh Ghosh
- Education: Don Bosco School, Park Circus, Kolkata
- Occupation: planetary geologist
- Known for: Member of NASA teams for Mars Pathfinder, MER, and selection of Curiosity landing site (Gale Crater)
- Awards: NASA Mars Pathfinder Achievement Award (1997); NASA Mars Exploration Rover Achievement Award (2004)

Amitabh Ghosh is a planetary geologist. Ghosh has played prominent roles in other NASA missions, such as the Mars Pathfinder and the MER (Mars Exploration Rover). He was the only Asian in the Pathfinder mission.

He was honoured with the NASA Mars Pathfinder Achievement Award in 1997 and the NASA Mars Exploration Rover Achievement Award in 2004.
