= Amitav Mallik =

Indian defence technologist

- Born: India
- Occupation: Defence technologist
- Known for: Defence technology
- Awards: Padma Shri

Amitav Mallik is an Indian defence technologist and the founder director of the Laser Science and Technology Center, Defence Research and Development Organization (DRDO), India, known for his expertise in the defence system design and development. He is an advisor to the National Security Advisory Board of India and a former advisor of Defence Technology at the Embassy of India in Washington DC. Author of a book on defence technology, Technology and Security in the 21st Century: A Demand-side Perspective, and more than 50 technical papers and over 100 classified analysis documents on defence technology, Mallik was honored by the Government of India, in 2002, with the fourth highest Indian civilian award, the Padma Shri.

== Books ==
- Mallik, Amitav (2004). Technology and Security in the 21st Century: A Demand-side Perspective. Oxford University Press. ISBN 978-0199271764.
- Mallik, Amitav (2006). Indian Science and Technology. Observer Research Foundation. ASIN B002QVT52A.
- Mallik, Amitav; Mate, Nitant; Bhave, Devayani (2009). Renewable Energy Technologies: Special Focus on Distributed Power Generation: Potential for Applications to Rural Sector in India. Academic Foundation. ISBN 978-8171886647.
- Gupta, Arvind; Mallik, Amitav; Lele, Ajey, eds. (2012). Space Security: Need for Global Convergence. Pentagon Press. ISBN 978-8182746053.
- Mallik, Amitav (2012). High Power Lasers-Directed Energy Weapons: Impact on Defence and Security. Defence Research and Development Organisation. ISBN 978-8186514368.
- Mallik, Amitav (2016). Role of Technology in International Affairs. Pentagon Press. ISBN 978-8182748811.

== See also ==
- National Security Advisory Board
- Defence Research and Development Organization
