= Mount Amida =

Mountain in the country of Japan

- Location within Japan

Highest point
- Elevation: 837 m (2,746 ft)
- Coordinates: 34°27′01″N 132°16′25″E

Geography
- Location: Saeki-ku, Hiroshima Prefecture, Japan

Mount Amida (阿弥陀山, Amidayama) is an 837-metre-high (2,746 ft) mountain in Saeki-ku, Hiroshima, Japan.
