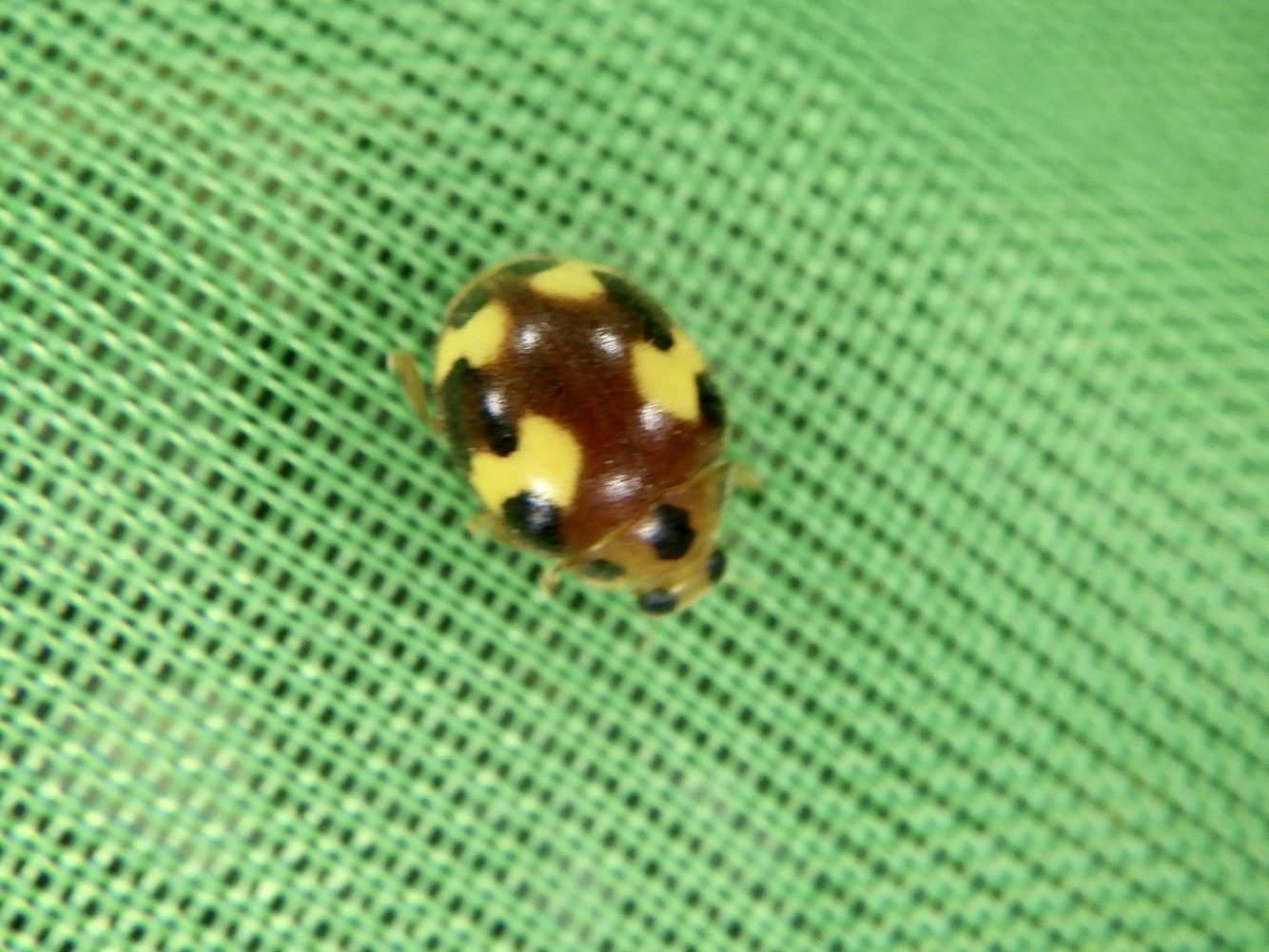
- Amida tricolor

Scientific classification
- Kingdom: Animalia
- Phylum: Arthropoda
- Class: Insecta
- Order: Coleoptera
- Suborder: Polyphaga
- Infraorder: Cucujiformia
- Family: Coccinellidae
- Subfamily: Coccinellinae
- Tribe: Ortaliini
- Genus: Amida; Lewis, 1896

Species
- Amida platyceps Amida tricolor etc.

= Amida (beetle) =

Genus of beetles

Amida is a genus of ladybirds primarily found in Asia. A relatively small genus although new species are still being discovered and described in China and Vietnam.
