= Ameet Mehta =

Indian lawyer

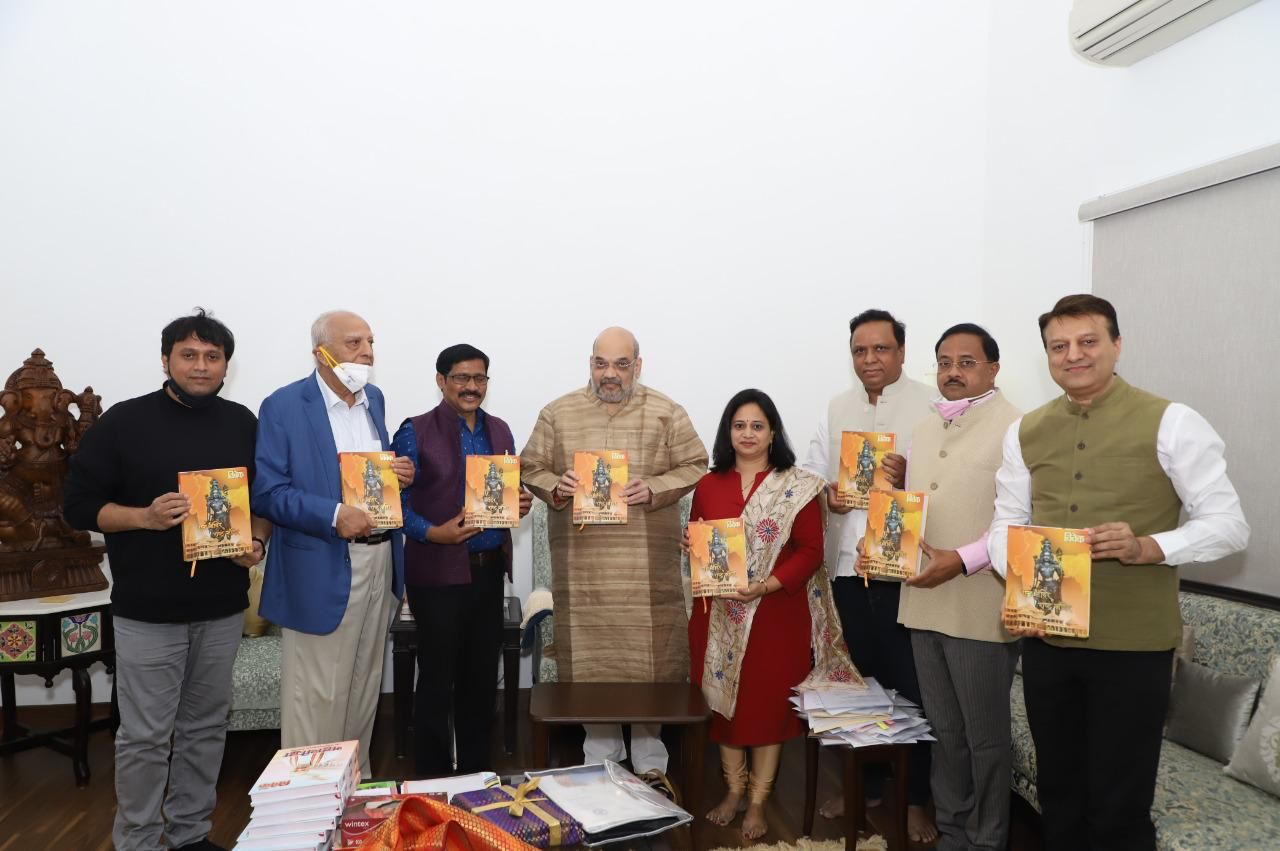

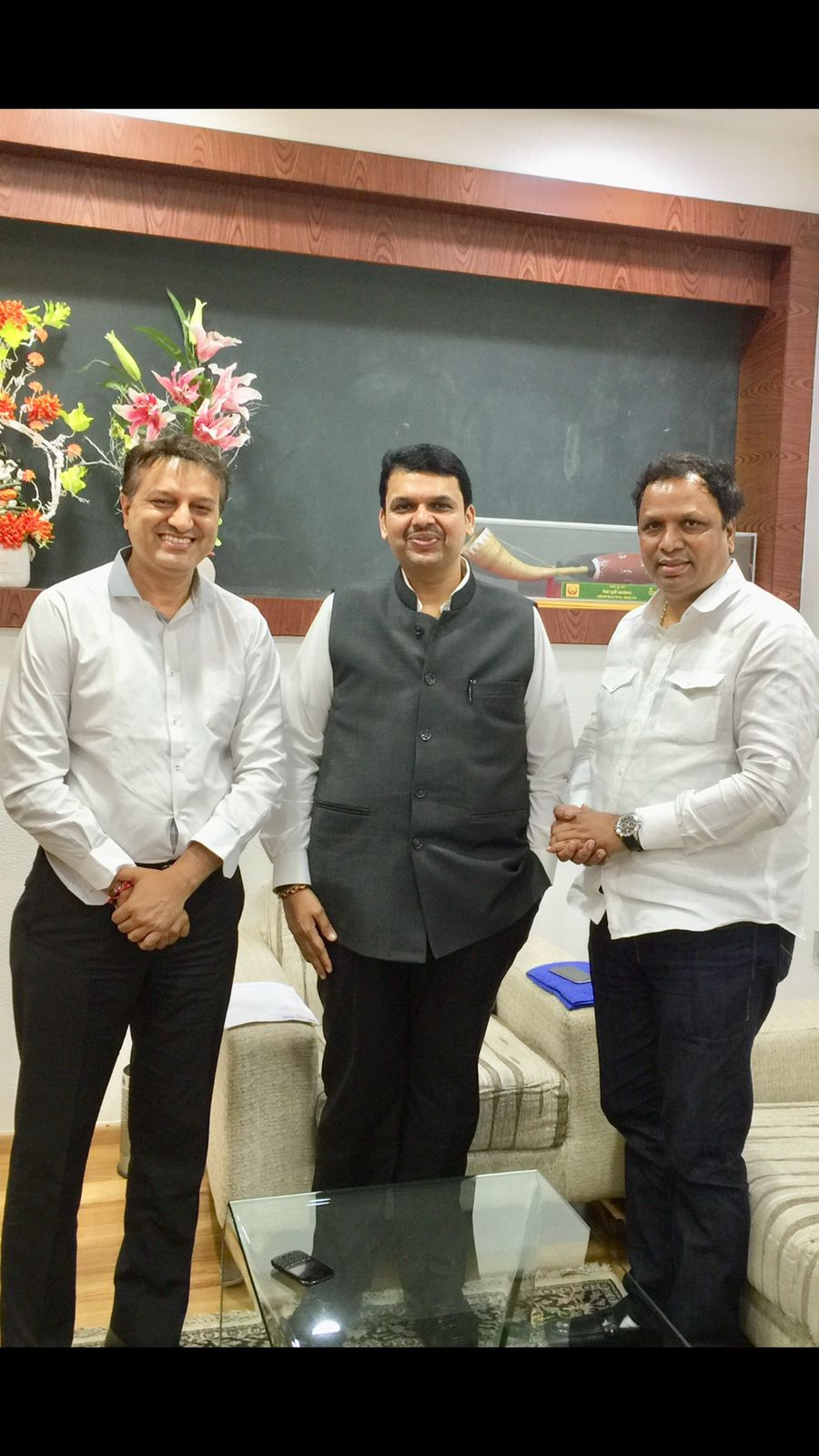

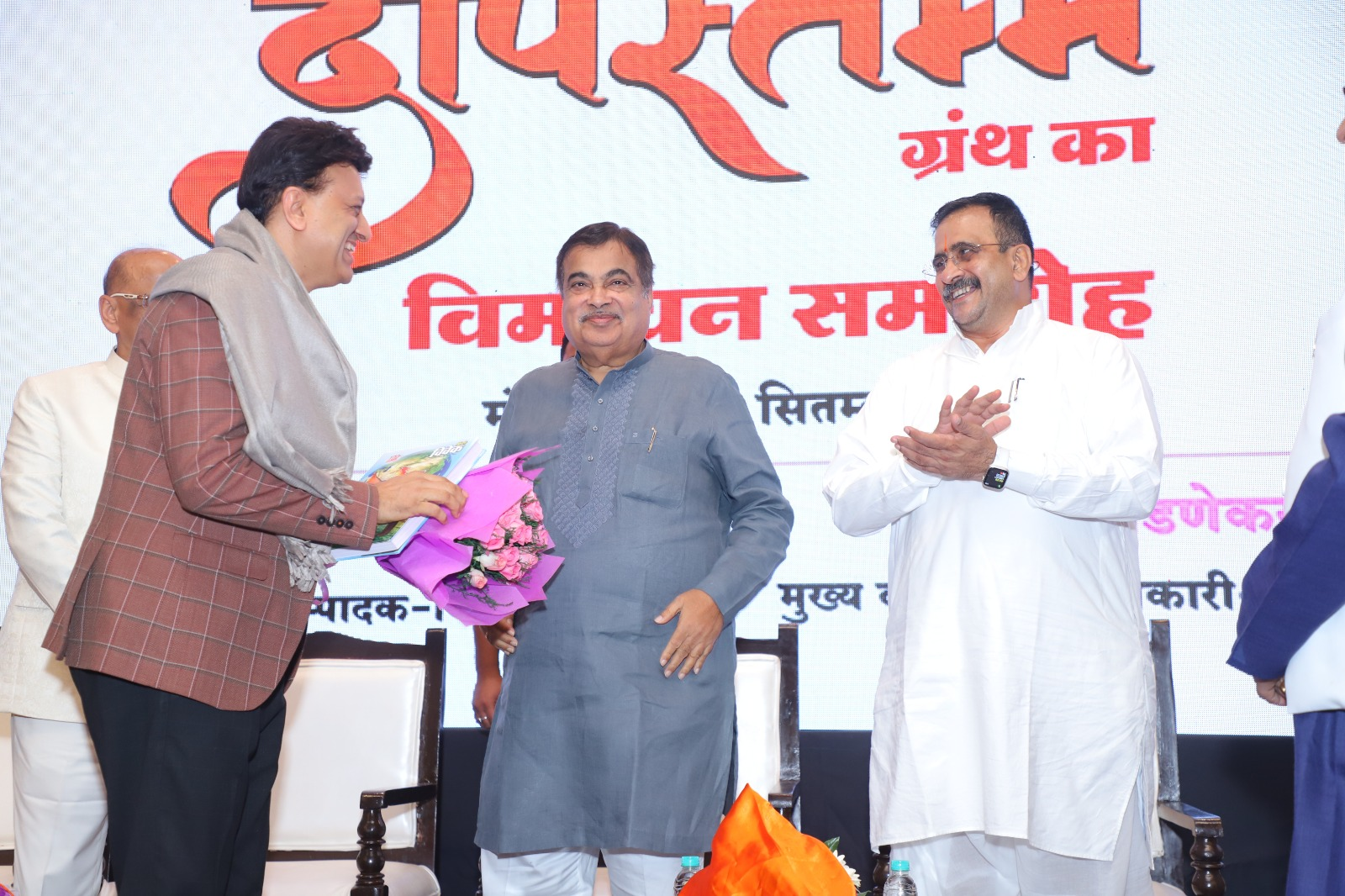

Ameet Vilaschandra Mehta (also known as Ameet Kumar) is an Indian lawyer.

He is the recipient of "Best Legal Advisor Award," 2013, "Maharashtra Gaurav Award," 2014, "USA Congressional Recognition" 18th Dist, Texas 2015, "National Real Estate Award" 2016, "Best Brands and Leaders of Asia Award", 2018, "Khoobsurat Jewels of India Award", 2019 and “Young Entrepreneurs Award”, 2020. Economic Times - Industry Leaders Recognition Award 2020.

== Early life ==
Ameet Mehta was born in Mumbai and comes from a Gujarati Jain Hindu family. His grandfather was originally from Barshi District in Solapur, Maharashtra. His grandfather owned a medical shop when India was under British colonial rule and his father worked in a chemical industry before retiring.

Mehta has completed his early schooling in Mumbai, then took Engineering from Pune University, and Law (LLB) from Mumbai University. He completed a full-time MBA Finance course from the UK's Leeds University Business School, International Trade Management from Narsee Monjee, Mumbai and a professional course on Mergers and Acquisitions from London Business School.

A

=== Lawyer ===
He is Managing Partner currently heading the law firm "Solicis Lex", Partner in Zurich Media House LLP, Trustee at Himgiri Gurukul Trust with Yoga Institute Chairperson Hansaben Yogendra and legal advisor for CA firm JBTM Associates LLP. He is also on board of various companies, trustee and governing councils in many organizations. He is Global Director with Jain International Organization commonly called as JIO. He was instrumental in setting up Samuhik Vivah Sanstha formed by Charity Commissioner for mass marriages for economically deprived class of people in State of Maharashtra. He is also National Advisor along with MLA Ashish Shelar for BJ Films and TV Industries Association, a prominent Union which looks after the necessities of Film artists. He has been prominent and vocal in his concerns on cooperative issues and Indian property laws. He has also represented former Union Home Minister Sushilkumar Shinde in a contempt case. He has advised on the interpretation of the Real Estate Regulatory Act, RERA and was on the advisory committee while drafting of RERA bill. He is also academic council member of Maharashtra national law University. He is an expert in many subjects of law and works closely with law professionals in Dubai, the United States, Switzerland, UK and Israel. He is a co-author for Ready Reckoner's (a stamp duty and property valuation book) for Mumbai. He has also been a pioneer in many conveyance matters in Mumbai. He has been Lawyer of many film celebrities, representing late actress Sadhana for several years, representing Vijayta Pandit, Lalit Pandit and the family, Raza Murad's Family, Poonam Dhillon, Jeetendra, Bhagyashree, Fashion Designer Shaina NC, Director Anees Bazmee,Akashdeep & Sheeba and many others. Recently he was selected to recommend Amnesty Scheme with few prominent members in Mumbai and assigned task to study how OC can be given more than 25000 Societies in Mumbai.

=== Political career ===
Mehta started his political career as a leader of the student wing. He was in charge of the Professional Cell BJYM in the national team of BJYM, BJP District General Secretary in Mumbai North West, President – Legal Cell, BJP Mumbai. He has been closely associated with former Governor Ram Naik of Uttar Pradesh and other political leaders in the BJP such as M.P Gopal Shetty, Poonam Mahajan in the BJYM Team, during his early days with MLA and Cabinet Minister Advocate Ashish Shelar, former Minister Prakash Mehta, former Minister and MLA Yogesh Sagar, MLA and former Minister Vidya Thakur, MLA Raj Purohit and Maharashtra BJP Leader Jaiprakash Thakur. He has also been associated with Trustee of Giants Welfare Organization and BJP Leader Shaina NC, Censor Board Appellate Member Poonam Dhillon, former General Secretary of BJP Mumbai and Ex-Treasurer of Siddhi Vinayak Temple Sumant Ghaisas, and received recognition at the hands of SVKM Chairman Amrish bhai Patel. He visited the United States in 2015 to spread awareness of the newly elected BJP government and reach out to Indians residing there, attending several events around the country.

=== Acting career ===
Mehta made his debut in a Hindi political-drama film Love You Loktantra, released on 14 October 2022 as a lawyer on a Constitutional issue.

== Personal life ==
Mehta is married to Bhavini Mehta and the couple has two Daughters.

He is one of the trustees of Pandit Deendayal Samaj Seva Kendra. The mentor and former Managing Trustee of this trust was Uttar Pradesh Ex-Governor Ram Naik.

Mehta is the Secretary of one of the most active ALMs, Malad Mindspace. He is also on the panel of the Indian Merchants Chamber. He is associated with many Software Associations, with Cooperative Societies Users and Welfare Association, Association of MBA's, UK, and various Alumni in Mumbai, Pune, and United Kingdom. Recently he was also awarded and honored at hand of Shri Nitin Gadkari in September 2025.
