= Zenoria crotchi =

Scientific classification
- Kingdom: Animalia
- Phylum: Arthropoda
- Clade: Pancrustacea
- Class: Insecta
- Order: Coleoptera
- Suborder: Polyphaga
- Infraorder: Cucujiformia
- Family: Coccinellidae
- Genus: Zenoria
- Species: Z. crotchi

Binomial name
- Zenoria crotchi Gordon, 1971

Species of beetle

Zenoria crotchi is a species of beetle of the family Coccinellidae. It is found in Brazil.

== Description ==
Adults reach a length of about 3.36 mm. Adults are pale yellow. The elytron has a large metallic green spot and the pronotum has a piceous basal median projection. Both the elytron and pronotum are covered with yellowish white hairs.
