= Amitabh Aurora =

Indian film director

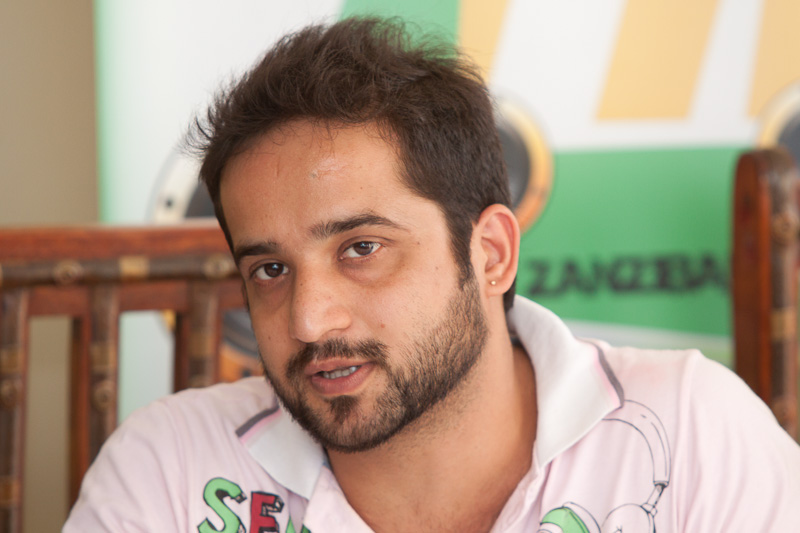
- Aurora at the 2011 Zanzibar International Film Festival
- Born: 11 June 1982 (age 43); Allahabad, Uttar Pradesh, India
- Occupations: Director; Screenwriter; Actor

Amitabh Aurora (born 11 June 1982, Allahabad) is an Indian film director, screenwriter and actor. Aurora is best known for his Bongo films in the Swahili language and is cited as having written and directed ‘the first high quality Bongo movie from Zanzibar.’

== Career ==
Aurora began his career in New Delhi, working as a stage actor for 4 years with New Delhi Players and Yatrik Theatre Group. He moved to Mumbai to be an actor where he worked acting in T.V. serials for 3 years.

He moved to Tanzania, East Africa in 2009 where he wrote and directed four feature films in Tanzania working for leading producer of Bongo movies Zanzibar-based ZG Films. All his Swahili feature films featured in the 2012 Zanzibar International Film Festival. Black Magic was shortlisted in the Montreal International Black Film Festival in 2012. He also Line Produced several foreign productions in Tanzania for BBC London, M Net South Africa and Al Jazeera News .

Aurora moved back to India in 2012 and began work as Executive Producer in Charlie Kay Chakkar Mein starring Naseeruddin Shah and as creative producer and additional dialogue writer in forthcoming film Chai Shai Biscuits both produced by Picture Thoughts Productions.

He directed and acted in several short films including Captain The Struggler, which was shortlisted in Paraj Mumbai Short Film Festival in 2014.

He wrote Television shows including Bani - Ishq Da Kalma and Kehta Hai Dil Jee Le Zara. In 2015 he assisted Tigmanshu Dhulia on feature film Yaara.

He is the founder and creative director of Mumbai-based production house Have Camera Make Films (HCMF). In early 2016 HCMF received critical acclaim in the Deccan Chronicle for their short film "Free Basics" featuring popular South Indian actress Shradda Das. The Chronicle described it as a "brilliant production" bringing " to the fore the topic of sudden, unplanned and haphazard growth, urbanisation and development." Free Basics was part of the official selection for the Zanzibar International Film Festival 2017.

In 2018 he produced and directed the short film "Blink to Speak" for agency TBWA/India, created for a non-profit, Asha Ek Hope Foundation and NeuroGen Brain & Spine Institute, which won the Health Grand Prix for Good at the 2018 Cannes Lions International Festival of Creativity.

In 2022, Amitabh wrote, directed and co-produced ASYLUM, a political thriller short film, starring Taher Shabbir, Rishina Kandhari, Sulbha Arya, Vaishnavi Dhanraj. It is being presented by eminent film maker Sudhir Mishra and has won best director for Amitabh in Florence Film Awards, best thriller in Paris Film Awards and had its European Premiere at the Indian Film Festival of Stuttgart in July 2023. It will be released on a leading ott platform in Dec 2023.

== Filmography ==
Feature Films

Film	Year	Notes
Usaliti	2009	Director, writer
Glamour - The Reality Behind The Dreams	2011	Director, writer
Black Magic	2012	Director, writer
Room Number 13	2012	Director, writer

Short Films

Film	Year	Notes
Undercurrent Temper	2009	Director, writer, actor
Captain The Struggler	2014	Director, writer, actor
Sauti za Busara	2011	Director, writer
Captain Returns	2015	Director, writer, actor
Free Basics	2016	Director, writer
Asylum	2023	Director, Producer, Writer

== Acting ==
Role	Production	Year
Yash	Astitva...Ek Prem Kahani	2005, 2006
Vicky	Woh Hue na Humaare	2006, 2007
Various	Aisi ki taisi	2007, 2008

== Writing credits ==
Title	Production/Channel	Year
Bani – Ishq Da Kalma	Colors TV	2014
Kehta Hai Dil Jee Le Zara	Sony TV	2013
Chai Shai Biscuits	Picture Thoughts Productions	2013
Asylum	HCMF Productions	2023
