= Amitabha Mukhopadhyay =

Indian biologist (born 1959)

- Born: 5 January 1959 (age 67); West Bengal, India
- Education: University of Calcutta; Jadavpur University; Institute of Microbial Technology
- Known for: Studies on host-pathogens interaction and drug discovery
- Awards: 2000 N-BIOS Prize; 2002 Shanti Swarup Bhatnagar Prize
- Scientific career
- Fields: Biology
- Workplaces: National Institute of Immunology; Washington University in St. Louis; Cornell University

Amitabha Mukhopadhyay (born 5 February 1959) is an Indian cell biologist and a professor at the National Institute of Immunology. He is known for his studies on host-pathogens interaction and drug discovery and is an elected fellow of the Indian Academy of Sciences, and the National Academy of Sciences, India.

Mukhopadhyay, an alumnus of the University of Calcutta from where he earned an MSc, secured a Ph.D. from Jadavpur University after doing his research at the Institute of Microbial Technology. Subsequently, he joined the National Institute of Immunology, India where he holds the position of a professor. He also serves as a visiting scientist at Washington University School of Medicine, and Weill Cornell Medicine. He has carried out research on the host-parasite interactions of Salmonella and Leishmania, two microbial pathogens. He is reported to have identified the survival mechanisms of salmonella against host macrophages and his work has assisted in widening the understanding of hemoglobin endocytosis in Leishmania, thus assisting in exploring new drug targets for diseases such as typhoid fever and kala azar. His studies have been documented by way of a number of articles (Note: Please see Selected bibliography section) and the online repository of scientific articles of the Indian Academy of Sciences has listed 24 of them.

Mukhopadhyay is a recipient of the National Bioscience Award for Career Development of the Department of Biotechnology in 2000. The Council of Scientific and Industrial Research, the apex agency of the Government of India for scientific research, awarded him the Shanti Swarup Bhatnagar Prize for Science and Technology, one of the highest Indian science awards, for his contributions to biological sciences in 2002. (Note: Long link - please select award year to see details)

== Selected bibliography ==
Leishmaniasis (life cycle)

- Srividya, S.; Roy, R. P.; Basu, S. K.; Mukhopadhyay, A. (2000). "Scavenger receptor-mediated delivery of muramyl dipeptide activates antitumor efficacy of macrophages by enhanced secretion of tumor-suppressive cytokines". Journal of Leukocyte Biology. 67 (5): 683–690. doi:10.1016/0006-2952(93)90502-N. PMID 8373443.
- Mukherjee, Konark; Parashuraman, Seetharaman; Raje, Manoj; Mukhopadhyay, Amitabha (2001). "Sope acts as an Rab5-specific nucleotide exchange factor and recruits non-prenylated Rab5 on Salmonella-containing phagosomes to promote fusion with early endosomes". Journal of Biological Chemistry. 276 (26): 23607–23615. doi:10.1074/jbc.M101034200. PMID 11316807.
- Singh, B. Sudha; Tandon, Ruchi; Krishnamurthy, Ganga; Vikram, Rajagopal; Sharma, Nimisha; Basu, K. Sandip; Mukhopadhyay, Amitabha (2003). "Rab5-mediated endosome–endosome fusion regulates hemoglobin endocytosis in Leishmania donovani". The EMBO Journal. 22 (21): 5712–5722. doi:10.1093/emboj/cdg557. PMC 275414. PMID 14592970.
- Patel, Nitin; Singh, Sudha B.; Basu, Sandip K.; Mukhopadhyay, Amitabha (2008). "Leishmania requires Rab7-mediated degradation of endocytosed hemoglobin for their growth". Proceedings of the National Academy of Sciences of the United States of America. 105 (10): 3980–3985. Bibcode:2008PNAS..105.3980P. doi:10.1073/pnas.0800404105. PMC 2268841. PMID 18319337.

== See also ==
- Plasmodium falciparum
- Leishmaniasis
