= Zenoria irregularis =

Scientific classification
- Kingdom: Animalia
- Phylum: Arthropoda
- Clade: Pancrustacea
- Class: Insecta
- Order: Coleoptera
- Suborder: Polyphaga
- Infraorder: Cucujiformia
- Family: Coccinellidae
- Genus: Zenoria
- Species: Z. irregularis

Binomial name
- Zenoria irregularis (Crotch, 1874)

Synonyms
- Exoplectra irregularis Crotch, 1874

Species of beetle

Zenoria irregularis is a species of beetle of the family Coccinellidae. It is found in Brazil (Pará).

== Description ==
Adults reach a length of about 4.2 mm (0.17 in). They have a red head and a black pronotum with pale red edges. The underside and legs are also red.
