= Amitabh Rajan =

Amitabh Rajan I.A.S
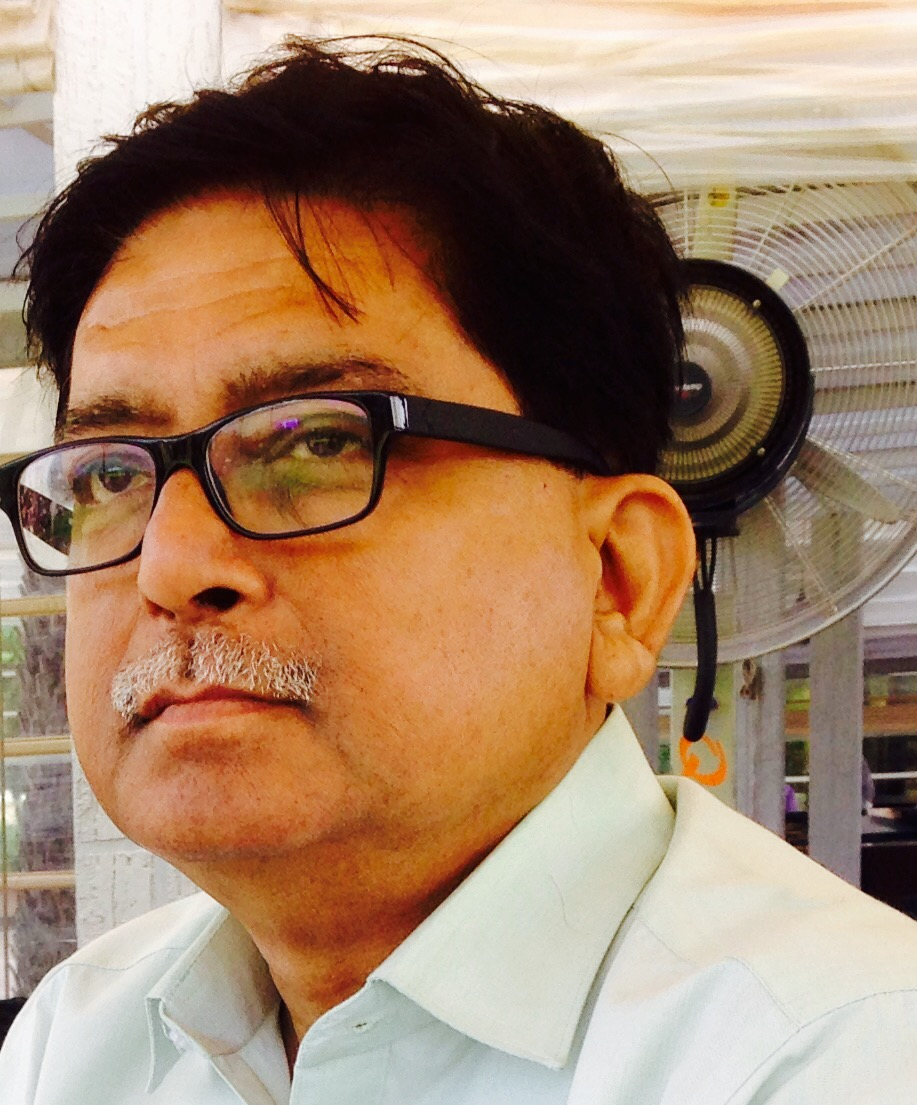
- Amitabh Rajan

Chairman, Reserve Bank of India Services Board
- In office November 2018 - October 2022

Home Secretary of Maharashtra

Home Secretary of Maharashtra and Additional Chief Secretary
- In office 13 March 2012 - 31 December 2014

Additional Secretary (Revenue), Ministry of Finance
- In office 29 November 2011 - 13 March 2012

Chief Vigilance Officer, Department of Revenue, Ministry of Finance
- In office 29 November 2011 - 13 March 2012

Director General, Enforcement Directorate of India
- In office 2012

Additional Secretary, Administrative Reforms, Ministry of Personnel
- In office 2010 - 2011

Personal details
- Born: 1 January 1955 (age 71)
- Education: Jawaharlal Nehru University
- Occupation: Civil servant
- Known for: Home Secretary of Maharashtra and Additional Chief Secretary, and Chairman of Reserve Bank of India (Services Board)

Amitabh Rajan

Academic work
- Discipline: Sociology; Economics; Management; Banking; Finance; Governance; Jurisprudence; Internal Security; History
- Institutions: Delhi University, Jawaharlal Nehru University

Amitabh Rajan (born 1 January 1955) is an Indian Administrative Service officer of Maharashtra cadre and the former Home Secretary and Additional Chief Secretary of Maharashtra. He headed the Reserve Bank of India Services Board as its Chairman from 2018-2022, and was also an Independent Director in the Board of the State Trading Corporation of India. He has made significant contributions to the fields of Sociology, Economics, and Jurisprudence.

== Early life and education ==
Rajan holds a Bachelor of Arts in History, a Master of Arts (with Distinction) in Modern History and a Doctorate in Sociological Jurisprudence from Jawaharlal Nehru University.

== Career ==
Rajan started his civil service career by joining the Indian administrative service in 1979. As a career bureaucrat, he served the State Government of Maharashtra and the Government of India, in various capacities. With the Government of Maharashtra and Government of India, Rajan has held very senior positions in the areas of Internal Security, Finance, Power Sector Regulation, Corporate Governance and Investment Commission. He held the charge of the Additional Chief Secretary and the Home Secretary, Government of Maharashtra.

As Maharashtra's Home Secretary, Rajan headed "Operation X", the hanging of the terrorist Ajmal Kasab. Rajan also gave sanction to prosecute Zabiuddin Ansari (aka Abu Jundal) in the Aurangabad Arms Haul Case, on the strength of which Abu Jundal was convicted to life imprisonment by the Special Court (MCOCA).

Rajan established the Maharashtra Police Establishment Board, and was responsible for the selection of various Police Commissioners and Director Generals in the State of Maharashtra, including two Police Commissioners of Mumbai, and Police Commissioners of Pune, Thane, etc.

He chaired several high-powered committees, including the committee setup to improve the low conviction rate in Maharashtra, which improved state-level conviction-rate in the next calendar year, and the committee setup by the Bombay High Court to improve traffic congestion in Mumbai City.

Rajan served as the Additional Secretary (Revenue) in the Department of Revenue, Ministry of Finance from 29 November 2011 to 13 March 2012. He also held the additional charge of Director Enforcement. Prior to this, he served as the Additional Secretary in the Ministry of Personnel from 2010 to 2011.

From 2006 to 2011, he served as the Principal Secretary and Investment Commissioner to the Government of Maharashtra, and was the Chairman and Managing Director of a National Finance and Development Corporation from 2001 to 2006. Prior to this, he has served the Government of India in various capacities, as the Secretary to the Maharashtra Electricity Regulatory Commission, the Director of Finance (Ministry of Social Justice), the Deputy Secretary (Home: Special), and District Magistrate for Jalgaon and Nanded districts in Maharashtra.

He has represented India in various international venues, including at the 2012 Ministerial Conference of Paris Pact, where he led the Indian delegation in the absence of the Union Finance Minister. He also led the Indian delegation at SAARC summits in Pakistan (1993) and Bangladesh (1992).

He has also held memberships in the Council of Administration, International Institute of Administrative Sciences, Brussels, the Governing Council of the Asian Group of Public Administration, Beijing, and the Commonwealth Association for Public Administration & Management, London. His biographical entry has been included in the INFA Annual Publication "India: Who’s Who" since 2002, under the Finance category. He is also the Honorary President of The International Chamber of Professional Education and Industry

== Corporate and establishment boards ==
Corporate Boards

- Chairman, Reserve Bank of India (Services Board) (2018-2022)
- Member, Independent Committee on Stressed Assets, State Bank of India (2019-)
- Independent Director, State Trading Corporation of India (2017-2020)
- Chairman, Nomination and Remuneration Committee, State Trading Corporation of India (2017-2020)
- Chairman, Board of Directors, Maharashtra State Security Corporation (2012-2014)
- Chairman, Board of Directors, Maharashtra Police Housing Corporation (2012-2014)
- Chairman and Managing Director, National SC Finance and Development Corporation (2001-2006)
- Member, Board of Directors, National BC Finance and Development Corporation (2001-2006)
- Member, Board of Directors, National Handicapped Finance Corporation (2001-2006)
- Member, Board of Directors, National Jute Manufacturers Corporation, Ltd. (2002-2006)

Establishment Boards

- Chairman, Maharashtra Police Establishment Board (2013-2014)
- Member, State Civil Services Board for IAS officers (2013-2014)
- Member, State Civil Services Board for IFS officers (2013-2014)

Academic Councils

- Member, Advisory Board, Symbiosis School of Banking and Finance, Pune (2023-)
- Member, Academic Council, Institute of Technology and Science, Ghaziabad (2019-)
- Member, Academic Advisory Board, Vidyalankar Institute of Technology, Mumbai (2019-)
- Member, Academic Advisory Board, GL Bajaj Institute of Management and Research, Greater Noida (2019-)

== Books, articles, interviews and talks ==
Rajan has written several books, including "Administrative Ethics: A Conceptual Framework", "Ethical Dimensions of Administrative Power", "Sociology of Human Rights" and "Explorations in Local History and Literature". He has also authored over 15 research articles including the publications in Indian Journal of Public Administration: "Information Rights: A Jurisprudential Audit" and "Jurisprudence of Children’s Rights", and the publications in All India Reporter: "Evolution of Information Rights Jurisprudence", and "Jurisprudential Strength of Children’s Rights". As an authority on the Maharashtra Police, he was invited to write the introductory commentary on the book "The Maharashtra Police Act" by All India Reporter.

Rajan has also written several articles in the field of Finance, including “The Institutional Identity of India’s NITI Aayog”, “India’s Fourteenth Finance Commission: A SWOT-Analysis”, “Neoliberalism and After: Scope and Limits of Interest Group Representations in Public Finance Decisions”, and "Techno-economic Aspects of Modernization of Police Forces in India".

Rajan has given various invited talks -- "Techno-economic aspects of Modernization of Police Forces in India" (London), "Administrative Identity of Regulation in India" (International Congress of I.I.A.S., Lausanne, 2011), and "New Public Management Model: A Critique. Public Administration" (Leadership and Management Academy, Republic of South Africa, 2011) -- to name a few.

Books

- Administrative Ethics: A Conceptual Framework (Routledge London, 2023)
- Ethical Dimensions of Administrative Power (SAGE, 2021)
- Sociology of Human Rights, 2002
- Explorations in Local History and Literature, 1985

Articles

- Role of Innovation, Creation and Integration in Institution Building for the Fourth Industrial Revolution (Indian Institute of Public Administration Digest)
- Administrative Theory of Regulation: The Indian Scenario (Indian Journal of Public Administration)
- Institutional Dynamics of Governance Reforms in India (1991-2016) (Indian Journal of Public Administration)
- The Institutional Identity of India’s NITI Aayog (Indian Journal of Public Administration)
- India’s Fourteenth Finance Commission: A SWOT-Analysis (Indian Journal of Public Administration)
- Neoliberalism and After: Scope and Limits of Interest Group Representations in Public Finance Decisions (Indian Journal of Public Administration)
- The Maharashtra Police Act (All India Reporter)
- Evolution of Information Rights Jurisprudence (All India Reporter)
- Jurisprudential Strength of Children’s Rights (All India Reporter)
- Information Rights: A Jurisprudential Audit (Indian Journal of Public Administration)
- Jurisprudence of Children’s Rights (Indian Journal of Public Administration)

Invited Talks and Public Lectures

- Adoption of Technologies for Business Growth: The Post-2008 Era (Distinguished Lecture) (Institute of Technology and Science, Ghaziabad, October 2023)
- Institutional Adoption of Fintech Innovations (The Financial Express National CFO Summit, Mumbai, September 2023)
- Political Economy Since the Year 2008: Global Trends and Policy Options for Nations (Keynote Address) (The Economic Times Summit, March 2023)
- Banking and Finance in the Post-2008 Era (Keynote Address, National Research Conclave) (Symbiosis International University, August 2022)
- Conceptualizing Sustainability for IR 4.0 (Financial Technology Summit, Bengaluru, August 2022)
- Genesis and Evolution of the Reserve Bank of India (O.P.Jindal Global University, Sonepat, April 2022)
- Technovation: The Way Forward (BFSI and FinTech Summit 2022, Dun & Bradstreet India, Mumbai, March 2022)
- BFSI: Vision 2022 for India on the Next Steps (6th Elets BFSI CTO Virtual Summit, Delhi, February 2022)
- Building Resilience for Growth in the Manufacturing Sector (Institute of Management Studies, Ghaziabad, December 2021)
- Enterprise Development in the Post-2008 World (Institute of Technology and Science, Ghaziabad, November 2021)
- Digital Transformation of the Post-2008 Financial World (Dr D. Y. Patil International University, Pune, October 2021)
- Ethics of Prudence for the BFSI Sector: The Road Ahead (Trescon BFSI Future Tech Show, September 2021)
- Strategies for Future of People and Work (People Matters TechHR India, August 2021)
- Strategies for the Future of People & Work (Tech HR, New Delhi, August 2021)
- Redefining Governance for India’s BFSI Sector (BFSI Leadership Summit, New Delhi, July 2021)
- Ethics of Prudence for the BFSI Sector: The Road Ahead (Big BFSI Future Tech Show, Bengaluru, July 2021)
- Dynamics of Sovereign Will-Formation in Democracies (New Delhi, September 2020)
- Emerging Dimensions of Regulatory Ethics in Banking (Future of Banking Summit, Keynote Address, Mumbai, November 2019)
- Elements of Innovation, Integration and Creation in Management (November 2019)
- Transforming Governance with Emerging Technologies (BFSI Innovation and Technology Summit, Mumbai, August 2019)
- The Ethical Dimensions of Entrepreneurship (Institute of Technology and Science, Ghaziabad, August 2019)
- Corporate Expectations from Young Managers (Institute of Management Studies, Keynote Address, Ghaziabad, July 2019)
- Non-banking Financial Companies in India: A SWOT Analysis (The Economic Times DigiTech Conclave, Mumbai, May 2019)
- Institutional Foundations for FinTech in India (BFSI Gamechanger Summit, Goa, May 2019)
- Techno-Financial Dimensions of The Ayushman Bharat Initiative (Healthcare & Wellness Summit, 2018)
- Techno-Financial Prospects for India's Non-Banking Financial Corporations (5th NBFC100 Tech Summit, 2018)
- Addressing the gathering in I.T.S Digital Conclave-2017
- An Address to the Rajasthan Administrative Service officers, 2017
- The Dynamics of Internal Security in India: A Federal Perspective (Institute of Social Sciences, Center for Multilevel Federalism, 2017)
- The Institutional Politics of Anti-Corruption (Center for the Study of Developing Societies, 2017)
- Steps to Counter Asia's Security Threats Discussed
- The Institutional Politics of Anti-Corruption
- Discussion on Internal security by Dr. Amitabh Rajan & Shri M.L. Kumawat
- Techno-economic Aspects of Modernization of Police Forces in India (London)
- Administrative Identity of Regulation in India (International Congress of I.I.A.S., Lausanne, 2011)
- New Public Management Model: A Critique. Public Administration (Leadership and Management Academy, Republic of South Africa, 2011)

Interviews

- In conversation with Dr Amitabh Rajan, Chairman, Reserve Bank of India
- Prospects of e-governance for India‘s internal security
- A Q&A with Dr. Amitabh Rajan on the Plan for Every Child Initiative
- Keeping news of Ajmal Kasab hanging under wraps was biggest challenge: Amitabh Rajan
- In Maharashtra, the biggest threat is from the sea... security in terms of coast guard needs improvement
