= Zenoria serva =

Scientific classification
- Kingdom: Animalia
- Phylum: Arthropoda
- Clade: Pancrustacea
- Class: Insecta
- Order: Coleoptera
- Suborder: Polyphaga
- Infraorder: Cucujiformia
- Family: Coccinellidae
- Genus: Zenoria
- Species: Z. serva

Binomial name
- Zenoria serva Gordon, 1971

Species of beetle

Zenoria serva is a species of beetle of the family Coccinellidae. It is found in Brazil.

== Description ==
Adults reach a length of about 3.58 mm. Adults are black, with the anterior and lateral margins of the pronotum and the head yellow. Both the pronotum and the elytron are covered with greyish white hairs.
