= Amitabh Chandra =

Amitabh Chandra is an Indian-American academic and healthcare economist who is the Malcolm Wiener Professor of Social Policy at the John F. Kennedy School of Government at Harvard University.

Chandra received his BA and PhD in economics from the University of Kentucky; his dissertation was titled Labor Market Dropouts and the Racial Wage Gap, 1940-1990.

He is a recipient of the Eugene Garfield Award and the American Society of Health Economists (ASHE) medal.
