= Zenoria discoidalis =

Scientific classification
- Kingdom: Animalia
- Phylum: Arthropoda
- Clade: Pancrustacea
- Class: Insecta
- Order: Coleoptera
- Suborder: Polyphaga
- Infraorder: Cucujiformia
- Family: Coccinellidae
- Genus: Zenoria
- Species: Z. discoidalis

Binomial name
- Zenoria discoidalis (Kirsch, 1876)

Synonyms
- Siola discoidalis Kirsch, 1876

Species of beetle

Zenoria discoidalis is a species of beetle of the family Coccinellidae. It is found in Peru.

== Description ==
Adults reach a length of about 3.10–3.30 mm. Adults are yellowish white with a large spot on the elytron. Both the pronotum and elytron have sparse yellowish white hairs.
