= Amit Nimade =

Indian photographer (born 1976)

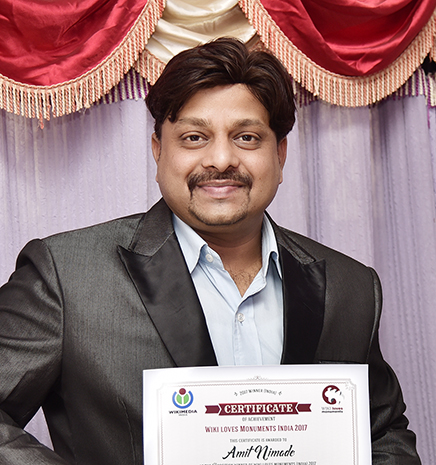
- Nimade with Wikimedia India Award 2017
- Born: 10 February 1976 (age 50); Indore, Madhya Pradesh, India
- Occupation: Photographer
- Years active: 2014–present

Amit Nimade is an Indian photographer known for his work in fine art, heritage, and documentary photography. His work has received national and international recognition through photography competitions and coverage in Indian newspapers.

== Early life and background ==
Amit Nimade was born in Indore, Madhya Pradesh, India, and later lived in Bhopal. He began pursuing photography in 2014, gradually developing an interest in fine art and documentary photography. His early journey into professional photography and subsequent recognition were highlighted by Indian newspapers.

== Career ==
Nimade began pursuing photography professionally in 2014, gradually establishing himself in fine art, heritage, and documentary photography. His early work focused on architectural heritage and cultural documentation, with an emphasis on visual storytelling through historical monuments and public spaces.

In 2017, his work gained national recognition after he was named a national winner at the Wiki Loves Monuments (India) photography competition, organised as part of the Wikimedia movement. Two of his photographs were selected among the national winners, with images of the Sanchi Stupa and Humayun’s Tomb securing positions within the top ten at the national level. His work was also listed among the finalists at the international level of the competition.

Alongside monument photography, Nimade has worked on documentary-style visual projects addressing social themes. He directed a short film titled Nanhe Kadam, which focused on cleanliness and public awareness in alignment with the Swachh Bharat campaign. His work on social themes has been covered by Indian print media.

Nimade has also received international recognition through photography competitions. In 2017, he was a recipient of an award at the Chiiz International Photography Contest, as reported by Indian media.

His work and professional journey have been featured by Indian newspapers, highlighting his transition into professional photography, achievements in national and international competitions, and engagement with socially relevant visual themes.

== Awards and recognition ==
Nimade has received recognition at the state, national, and international levels for his work in photography.

- Wiki Loves Monuments India (2017): Two of his photographs were selected among the national winners of the Wiki Loves Monuments photography competition in India. His images of the Sanchi Stupa and Humayun’s Tomb secured positions within the top ten at the national level.
- Chiiz International Photography Contest (2017): Nimade received an award at the international photography competition organised by Chiiz Photography Magazine, as reported by Indian media.

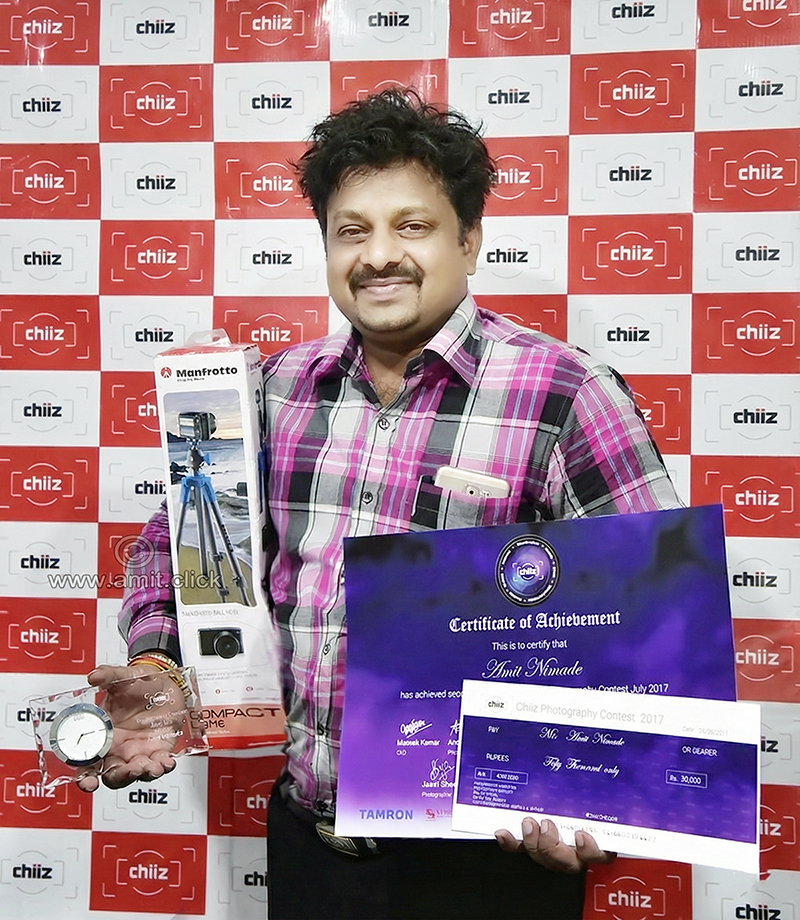
Nimade with the Chiiz International Photography Contest award, 2017

- 35th All India Level Photography Award (2016): He received an award in the category Natural Beauty of Flowers at the national-level photography competition organised by the Rose Society, Indian Rose Federation, and the Department of Horticulture, Government of India. The award ceremony is documented through images uploaded to Wikimedia Commons.
- State Level Photography Award (2016): Nimade was honoured with a state-level photography award during International Biodiversity Day celebrations organised by the Government of Madhya Pradesh. Photographs from the award ceremony have been made available on Wikimedia Commons.

== Media coverage ==
Nimade’s work and professional journey have been covered by several national and regional Indian newspapers and online news outlets. Media coverage has highlighted his transition into professional photography, achievements in national and international competitions, and engagement with socially relevant visual themes.

Nimade’s photographs of the Sanchi Stupa and Humayun’s Tomb were selected among the top 10 Indian monuments, as reported by *Patrika* in 2017.

Nimade’s work was featured on World Photography Day in a 2025 article by SearchStory, highlighting his contributions to visual culture and photography in Indore.

Nimade has also been cited by Hindi-language newspapers for his commentary on emerging photography trends, including pre-maternity photo shoots and evolving visual practices.

== See also ==
- Fine-art photography
- Documentary photography
- Wiki Loves Monuments
