= Amitābha Buddha from Hancui =

6th-century Chinese monumental statue

Amitābha Buddha
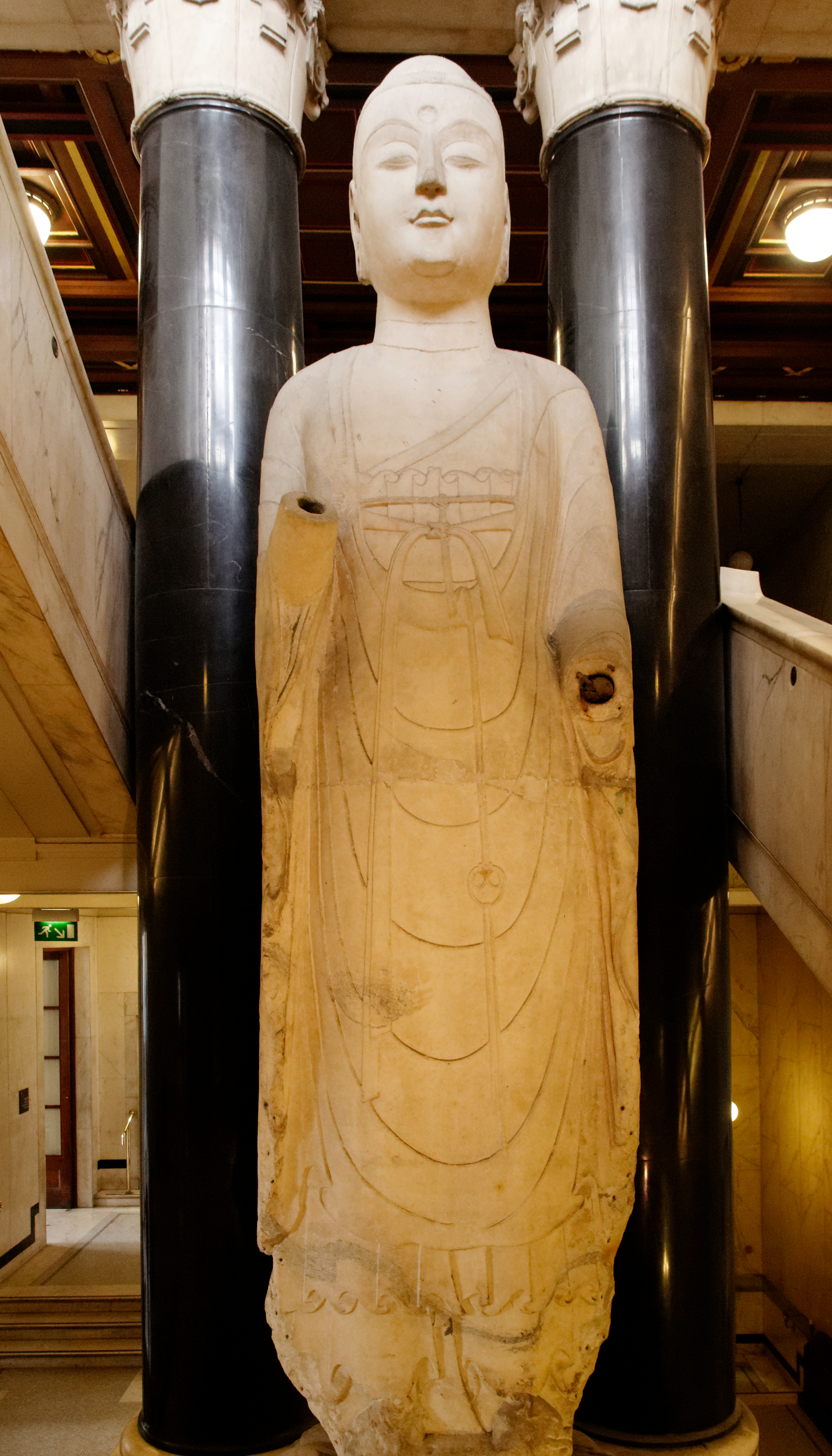
- The Amitābha Buddha on display at the British Museum
- Material: Marble
- Size: 5.8 metres (19 ft) high, 2 metres (6 ft 7 in) wide
- Created: 585 AD
- Present location: British Museum, London
- Registration: OA 1938.7-15.1

The Amitābha Buddha or Amitabha Buddha is an enormous Buddhist statue that was originally located in Hancui village in Hebei province, northern China. Dating to the 6th Century AD, it was given to the British Museum by the Chinese Government in 1938.

== Discovery ==
The inscription on the sculpture's base records that it was dedicated at the Chongguang temple in Hancui village in Hebei in the fifth year of Kaihung of the Sui dynasty, which equates to the year 585 AD. The village of Hancui can no longer be identified for certain, but it is understood to be located south-west of the city of Baoding in Hebei province, a region which in the past was known for its white marble. The statue was donated by the art dealer C.T. Loo to the Chinese Government, who in turn presented it in 1938 to the British Museum to commemorate the Chinese Exhibition, which took place in London between 1935 and 1936.

== Description ==
At nearly six metres (20 ft) high, the Amitābha Buddha is the largest ancient Chinese statue in the West. Although largely intact, the now missing hands would have been fixed into the arm sockets by dowels. The right hand would have been raised in the gesture of fearlessness (abhayamudra), and the left hand lowered in the gesture of bestowal (varadamudra). The figure was carved in high relief to reveal garments with very flat folds, which was typical of figurative art in the Sui period. The whole statue stands on a massive lotus base with a dedicatory inscription in Chinese. Traces of red paint have also been found on the back. The Amitābha Buddha was originally flanked by a smaller standing bodhisattva that is now in the Tokyo National Museum.

== Buddhism in China ==
In Buddhist doctrine, Amitābha rules over the Western Paradise, a serene and heavenly land where those who repeatedly chant his name can be reborn. Amitābha was very popular during the Sui dynasty (589-618 AD), when many buddhist images were created for pious devotees. This colossal marble figure is thought to be one such work and may have been modelled on Indian bronze statuary brought to China through the Silk Road.

== Gallery ==
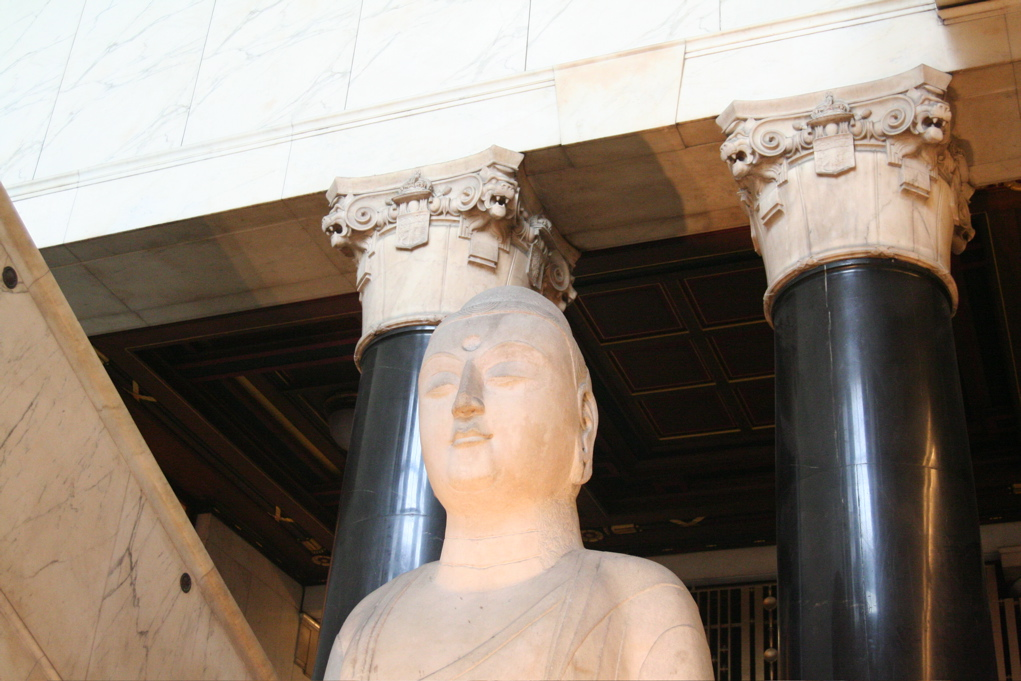
Detail of the head from the Amitābha Buddha
