= Amit Sharma (cricketer) =

Indian cricketer (born 1974)

Personal information
- Full name: Amit Sharma
- Born: 20 November 1974 (age 51); Jullundur, Punjab, India
- Batting: Right-handed
- Bowling: Right arm off spin
- Role: All-rounder

Domestic team information
- Years: Team
- 1992/93–1999/00: Punjab
- 2000/01–2003/04: Himachal Pradesh
- FC debut: 13 March 1993 Punjab v Madhya Pradesh
- Last FC: 28 December 2003 Himachal Pradesh v Maharashtra
- LA debut: 6 December 1993 Punjab v Services
- Last LA: 12 January 2003 North Zone v West Zone

Career statistics
Competition	First-class	List A
Matches	53	40
Runs scored	2,106	791
Batting average	28.08	24.71
100s/50s	3/9	0/3
Top score	161	94
Balls bowled	1,554	838
Wickets	17	21
Bowling average	47.35	31.95
5 wickets in innings	0	0
10 wickets in match	0	0
Best bowling	3/21	3/22
Catches/stumpings	40/–	15/–
- Source: CricketArchive, 30 September 2008

Amit Sharma (born 20 November 1974), is an Indian cricketer. He is a right-handed batsman and a right-arm offbreak bowler. Amit Sharma was considered as an allrounder and was the captain of the U-19 team that visited England in 1994 season and won the test series 1-0 that included a Test match century in the second game. The team lost 2–0 in the ODI series. Prominent members of the squad who made it to International cricket included VVS Laxman, Hrishikesh Kanitkar and Iqbal Siddiqui. The England team featured Marcus Trescothick, Michael Vaughan and Vikram Solanki in their squad.

Amit Sharma made his debut in Ranji Trophy domestic cricket in the 1992/93 season but never achieved his true potential. He never received an opportunity to play International Cricket and retired from domestic cricket after the 2003/04 season.
