= Bar Greenzaid =

Israeli indoor skydiving athlete, singer, model

- בר גרינזייד
- Occupation(s): indoor skydiving athlete, singer, model
- Website: www.bargreen.co.il

Bar Greenzaid (Hebrew: בר גרינזייד) is an Israeli indoor skydiving athlete, singer and model. She won first prize in the freestyle junior category at the Israeli Championship and in the IBA World League.

In 2023, Bar won in the world in the junior freestyle category in an indoor skydive held in Slovakia.

== Biography ==
She reached first position in the IBA World League and is a champion in bodyflight, having won first place in the "Freestyle Junior" category at the first Israeli championship held in the "Fly-Box" wind tunnel in Rishon LeZion. Bar Greenzaid debuted as a singer in 2019 with the release of the singles "Fire" and "Princesa." She later released several more singles, including "Mi Amor" and "U Na Na Na." Greenzaid sings in Spanish, English, French, and Hebrew. Bar is a presenter of the Junona Fashion House brand at the Moscow Mercedes Fashion Show. She was also the youngest participant in San Remo Junior Italy. In 2023, Bar won 5th place in the world in the junior freestyle category in an indoor skydive held in Slovakia.
