= Israel–South Africa relations =

- Israel: South Africa

Israel–South Africa relations refer to the current and historic relationship between the Republic of South Africa and the State of Israel. As of January 2024, South Africa maintains only "limited political and diplomatic interaction" with Israel due to the ongoing Israeli–Palestinian conflict.

In 1947, South Africa voted in favor of the UN Partition Plan to create Israel. During the 1950s and 1960s, Israel criticized the racial policies of South Africa. But from 1967 onwards, Israel deepened relations with the apartheid South African regime, and maintained diplomatic relations with the "Bantustans". Israel and South Africa also had a military alliance, including collaboration on nuclear weapons. Up to 1986, Israel also had a vibrant economic relationship but was forced to sanction South Africa in 1987 as a consequence of American pressure.

Relations began to deteriorate after apartheid ended in 1994. Nelson Mandela visited Israel, but was critical of its treatment of Palestinians. In 2019, South Africa downgraded relations with Israel in response to its killing of Gazan protestors. In 2023, during the Gaza war, South Africa sued Israel at the International Court of Justice, accusing Israel of committing genocide against Palestinians in violation of the Genocide Convention. Israel currently maintains an embassy in Pretoria and a trade office in Johannesburg, while South Africa has an embassy in Tel Aviv.

== Early relations (up to 1967) ==
=== 1948–1949: South African recognition of Israel ===
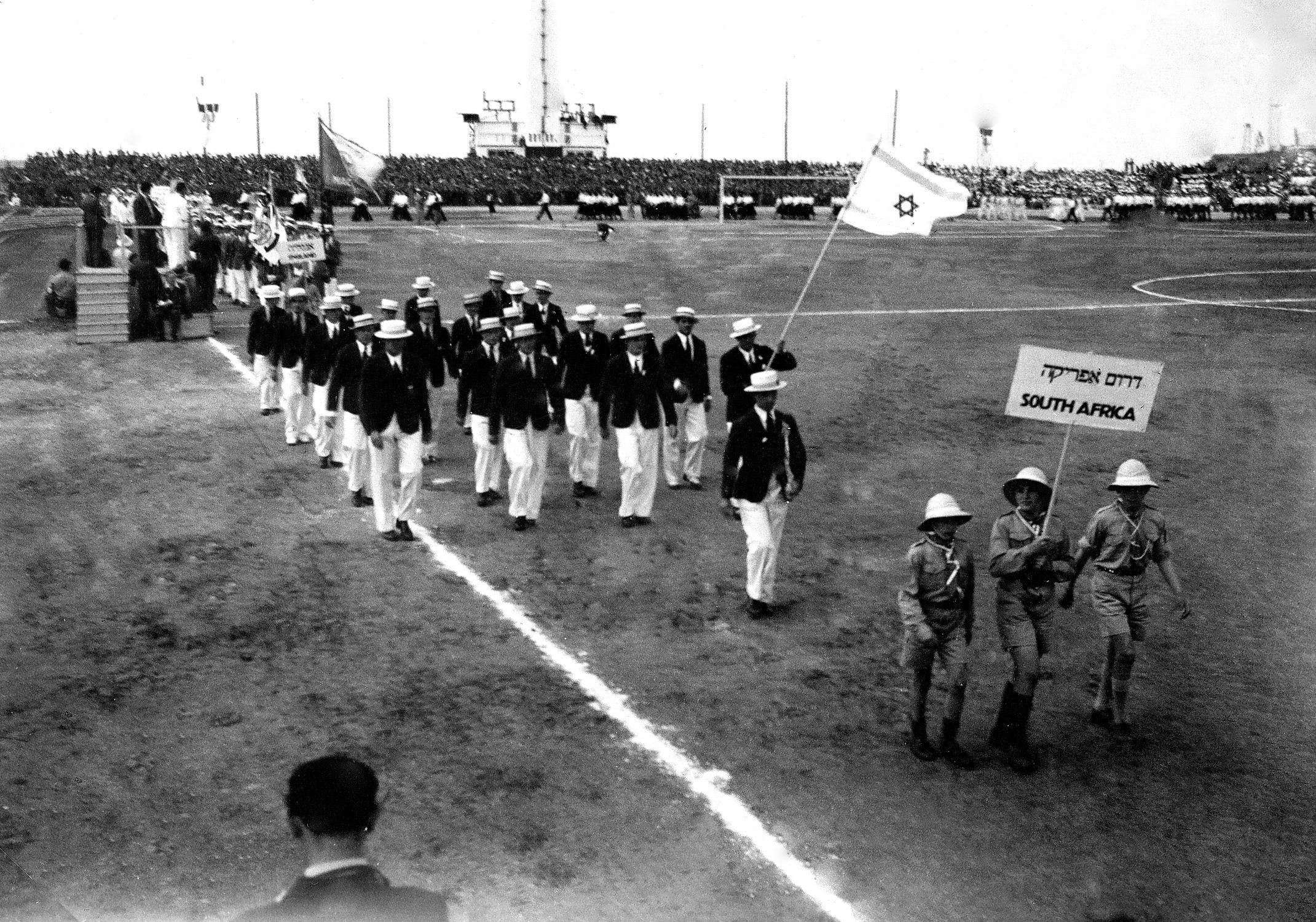
The South African delegation to the 1935 Maccabiah Games in Tel Aviv, Mandatory Palestine.

The Union of South Africa was among the thirty-three states that voted in favour of the 1947 United Nations (UN) Partition Plan, which endorsed the establishment of a Jewish state in Palestine. On 24 May 1948, nine days after Israel's declaration of independence, the South African government of Field Marshal Jan Smuts became the seventh foreign government to grant de facto recognition to the State of Israel. Two days later, Smuts – a long-time supporter of Zionism and a personal friend of Chaim Weizmann – was voted out in elections; the new South African government was formed by D.F. Malan's National Party (NP), which had run on a platform of legislating apartheid. This result was of interest to Israel primarily because of the presence in South Africa of a large Jewish population: by 1949, there were 120,000 Jews living in South Africa, the overwhelming majority of whom were Zionists, and many of whom had provided important financial support to the Zionist movement in the decades after the Balfour Declaration. After its election to government, the NP apparently overcame its earlier tendency towards "virulent anti-Semitism". The South African government granted de jure recognition to Israel on 14 May 1949. Formal diplomatic relations between the countries began in the same year, with the opening of Israel's consulate-general in Pretoria, later – in November 1950 – raised to the status of a legation. However, South Africa had no direct diplomatic representation in Israel, and was represented by the United Kingdom instead, until it sent a consul-general to Tel Aviv in 1972.

In addition to granting Israel diplomatic recognition, Malan permitted Jewish volunteer reserves to serve in Israel, and relaxed South Africa's rigid currency regulations to permit the export of commodities and foreign exchange to Israel. Indeed, in late 1948, Malan and his Minister of Defence had approved – and the South African Customs Department provided logistical assistance for – a $1.2 million shipment of goods to Israel, sponsored by the South African Zionist Federation. In 1951, Israeli Foreign Minister Moshe Sharett visited South Africa; and in 1953, Malan visited Israel personally, becoming the first Commonwealth prime minister to do so. Once elected in 1958, Prime Minister Hendrik Verwoerd assured Jewish South Africans that he would continue the friendly policies inaugurated by his predecessors, Malan and J.G. Strijdom. For this and for "helping Israel to attain its present status", he was publicly thanked by a visiting member of the Knesset, Mordechai Nurok, in 1959. Annual flows of funds to Israel from South Africa were estimated at $700,000 by that time, and in all it was estimated that South African Jews sent more than $19.6 million to Israel between 1951 and 1961.

=== 1950s–1960s: Israeli renunciation of apartheid ===
However, this ostensibly auspicious start to relations was complicated by Israel's stance in the increasingly vociferous UN General Assembly debates over South African apartheid. This had begun in the very week of Israel's accession to the UN in May 1949, when it had supported a motion requiring South Africa to enter into roundtable discussions with Pakistan and India over apartheid and its implications for Indian and Pakistani citizens. In December 1950, diplomat Michael Comay wrote in an internal memo that the Israeli strategy in such votes was to

generally refrain from condemnation of South Africa, and from passing any judgment on the specific merits of the issues ... On the other hand, we can and should refrain from any express or implied support for the South African caste system.

In a letter in December, Comay summarised this position as responding to the need to "find a compromise between our principles and convictions on matters of racialism, and our desire to maintain friendship with South Africa". According to legal historian Rotem Giladi, during the 1950s this manifested in frequent "equivocation" on apartheid by the Israeli mission to the UN – though Giladi also argues that Israel's speeches and votes on apartheid were nonetheless "considerably more progressive" than those of many Western states. And, during the 1960s, Israel became increasingly consistent in its criticism of the South African government: it frequently voted against South Africa and apartheid at the UN.

In October 1961, Israel voted at the UN to censure a speech made in virulent defence of apartheid by Eric Louw, the South African Foreign Minister. Israel and the Netherlands were the only two Western states to support the censure. South African prime minister and architect of South Africa's apartheid policies, Hendrik Verwoerd, dismissed an Israeli vote against South African apartheid at the United Nations, saying, "Israel is not consistent in its new anti-apartheid attitude ... they took Israel away from the Arabs after the Arabs lived there for a thousand years. In that, I agree with them. Israel, like South Africa, is an apartheid state." His successor John Vorster also maintained the same view.

In October 1962 at the UN General Assembly, Israel voted in favour of the landmark Resolution 1761, which strongly condemned apartheid and called for voluntary sanctions against South Africa. Members of the Israeli legislature, the Knesset, approved the measure in a 63–11 vote. The following year, Israel announced that it had withdrawn its envoy to South Africa, thus unilaterally reducing the status of its diplomatic representation, with its South African legation henceforth headed by a chargé d'affaires. It also announced that it was taking steps to enforce an embargo against the South African military, as called for by Resolution 1761. In October 1967, Israel was among the large majority of UN member states which voted in favour of a resolution terminating South Africa's mandate over South West Africa.

In the 1960s, senior Israeli politicians frequently framed diplomatic opposition to apartheid as a matter of principle: in October 1963, Golda Meir, then Israel's Foreign Minister, told the UN General Assembly that Israel's "deep abhorrence for all forms of discrimination on the grounds of race, colour or religion ... stems from our age-old spiritual values, and from our long and tragic historical experience as a victim". Israel also had strategic reasons to distance itself from South Africa: as a counterbalance to the hostility of the Arab and Soviet blocs, it increasingly sought closer ties with Sub-Saharan African states, which were gaining their political independence during that time and which strongly opposed the apartheid policy and South Africa's regional hegemony. These moral and strategic considerations had to be balanced against the concerns of South African Jews: the influential South African Jewish Board of Deputies feared an anti-Semitic backlash if Israel alienated the South African government, and, indeed, it passed a resolution declaring that "Israel should have joined the other western nations in abstaining from voting against South Africa" on Resolution 1761.

No matter Israel's motivations, the South African government highly resented its stance at the UN. Louw accused the Israeli government of "hostility and ingratitude ... in view of the fact that the South African government and individual members of the Cabinet have in the past gone out of their way to foster good relations with Israel", and Verwoerd argued publicly that "Israel, like South Africa, is an apartheid state". As a retaliatory measure, the concessions previously granted on foreign exchange flows to Israel were terminated. By 1967, diplomatic contact between Israel and South Africa was minimal, though not entirely non-existent. However, as academic Richard P. Stevens observes, "while recriminations increased on the international level so did the volume of trade between the two countries." Although Israel had begun to implement a military embargo, it had not severed commercial, maritime, and air links with South Africa, as encouraged in Resolution 1761. In 1967, Israeli exports to South Africa amounted to $4 million (more than double the figure for 1961), while South African exports to Israel were $3.3 million. This would indicate that, Israel's diplomatic emphasis on Sub-Saharan Africa notwithstanding – and despite this representing only a small fraction of each country's total trade – South Africa had become Israel's largest trading partner in Africa.

"We view Israel's position and problems with understanding and sympathy. Like us they have to deal with terrorist infiltration across the border; and like us they have enemies bent on their destruction."

— South African Prime Minister John Vorster, April 1971

== 1967–1994 ==
=== 1967-73: Israel alianated from Africa ===
In 1967, Israel's victory in the Six-Day War and subsequent occupation of the Sinai and the West Bank alienated it diplomatically from much of the Third World and Sub-Saharan Africa, whose nationalist movements began to view Israel as a colonial state. At the same time, Israel became the object of admiration among parts of the South African white population, particularly among the country's political and military leadership. An editorial in Die Burger, then the mouthpiece of the South African NP, declared:

"Israel and South Africa... are engaged in a struggle for existence... The anti-Western powers have driven Israel and South Africa into a community of interests which had better be utilized than denied."

The government of John Vorster permitted South African civilian and paramilitary volunteers to travel to Israel, and permitted the expansion of Zionist organising and fundraising inside South Africa. Efforts were made, particularly on the South African side, to strengthen trade and commercial contacts, facilitated by an Israeli–South African Friendship League and an Israel–South Africa Trade Association, both established in 1968. By April 1971, C. L. Sulzberger had observed "a remarkably close if little known partnership" between the countries. Yet Israel continued to pursue friendship with Sub-Saharan Africa, and, in a final expression of this strategy, in 1971, it offered $2,850 in aid to the Organization of African Unity's fund for liberation movements. The donation was rejected, but not before it severely irked the South African government.

=== 1973–1987: Strategic cooperation ===
The 1973 Yom Kippur War, however, came with "the near-complete collapse of Israel's position in Africa." By the end of 1973, all but four African states had severed diplomatic relations with Israel. This was partly due to the 1973 oil embargo instituted by the Organization of Petroleum Exporting Countries against Israel's Western partners, which reinforced a new alliance between the Arab and Sub-Saharan African states. According to Naomi Chazan, the oil embargo also created a partial rupture in Israel's relations with the West. After 1973, Israel sought closer ties with South Africa, a decision which has often been analysed as a pragmatic response to the former's increased international isolation – supported by what journalist Thomas Friedman describes as its newfound "'realpolitik' attitude that Israel has too few friends in the world to be choosey about its partners in trade and arms sales". A related but somewhat different interpretation posits a concerted effort to shore up a strategic tripartite alliance between South Africa, Israel, and the United States. This arrangement would have supported the American policy of containment in Africa, according to the Economist by allowing the United States to use Israel "as a clandestine conduit to South Africa" amid escalating public and international condemnation of the South African regime. The interests of South African Jews also remained an avowed foreign policy concern of the Israeli government.

"For years, Israel's policy toward South Africa was one of deliberate ambiguity – publicly condemning apartheid, while privately maintaining a pragmatic and mutually beneficial array of commercial and military ties."

— Thomas Friedman for The New York Times, 1987

==== Diplomatic and political cooperation ====
At the UN General Assembly in the 1970s, Israel abstained from some key votes affecting South Africa, such as the vote on granting observer status to the African National Congress (ANC) in 1972, and votes against apartheid in later years. South Africa returned the favour by abstaining from a vote which condemned the Israeli annexation of East Jerusalem. For the most part, however, and like many other Western nations at the time, Israel remained officially opposed to the apartheid system, while privately it cultivated relations with South Africa, and generally did not impose or enforce sanctions. In early 1974, the same year that South Africa's credentials to the UN General Assembly were rejected, Israel upgraded its South African legation to an embassy. The following year, South Africa upgraded its Tel Aviv legation – established as a consulate in 1972 – to an embassy. In April 1976, Prime Minister Vorster made a state visit to Prime Minister Yitzhak Rabin in Israel. Later in 1976, South Africa and Israel concluded a comprehensive cooperation pact, to be implemented by a joint ministerial committee. The contents of the agreement were not made public but appeared to be extensive and broad, covering both military and economic cooperation.

Initially, due to a desire to downplay its intimacy with Pretoria, the Israeli government reportedly prohibited ministerial visits to South Africa. And South Africa's apartheid policies continued to cause tension: in 1978, there was a "diplomatic incident" when Israel's ambassador to South Africa, Yitzak Unna, announced he was boycotting Golda, a play about Golda Meir's life, because it was being staged at a whites-only theatre. At least ten other Western ambassadors joined the boycott, and Meir herself said she fully supported Unna's decision. However, high-level diplomatic contact increased into the 1980s, especially after a Likud coalition came to power in Israel in 1977 – the new Prime Minister, Menachem Begin, was the chairman of the Israel–South Africa Friendship League. Bilateral visits were reportedly made, formally or informally, by, among others, South African Information Minister Connie Mulder (1974), South African Foreign Minister Pik Botha (1979, 1984), Israeli Finance Minister Simcha Erlich (February 1978), and (secretly) Israeli Defense Minister Ezer Weizmann (March 1980).

Israel also developed ties with South Africa's nominally independent "homelands". From the late 1970s, it began to establish direct economic links with the Transkei, Boputhatswana, the Ciskei, and the Bantu Investment Corporations. In Boputhatswana, this involved the employment of Israeli companies in several major projects, including an international airport and Olympic-sized stadium. The premiers of Bophuthatswana and KwaZulu, Lucas Mangope and Mangosuthu Buthelezi, both visited Israel in 1985. Moreover, Bophuthatswana established a mission in Tel Aviv called Bophuthatswana House, the only place outside South Africa to fly the homeland's flag, reportedly against the objections of the Israeli Ministry of Foreign Affairs. In 1984, the Israeli Ambassador, Eliyahu Lankin, said that Israeli policy was to comply with the 1979 UN General Assembly resolution urging against recognising the homelands, though he personally supported recognition.

==== Cultural and demographic ties ====
Ties between the populations of the two countries also strengthened after 1967. Over the 1970s, bilateral tourism grew: in 1979, approximately 10,000 Israelis visited South Africa, and the next year approximately 25,000 South Africans visited Israel. More importantly, by 1983, there were 12,000 South African Jews residing in Israel, and about 20,000 Israelis residing in South Africa (a figure which increased to 25,000 in 1987). Chazan reports that 1,500 South African Jews had participated in the 1967 Yom Kippur War, and that white South Africans declared Israel their favourite foreign country in a 1981 opinion poll. Several South African cities were formally twinned with Israeli cities. However, by 1980, the South African Jewish Board of Deputies – an influential representative of the South African Jewish community – had announced its support for the abolition of an apartheid, another factor which was likely to hinder overt diplomatic and political collaboration between Israel and the apartheid state.

By 1980, a sizeable contingent of South African military and government officials were living permanently in Israel, to oversee the numerous joint projects between the countries, while their children attended local Israeli schools. Scientific collaboration also continued to increase, with many scientists working in each other's countries. Perhaps most sensitive was the large group of Israeli scientists working at South Africa's Pelindaba nuclear facility.

South African Airways began operating flights between Johannesburg and Tel Aviv, but as it was banned from using the airspace of most African countries, it had to take a detour around West Africa, doubling the distance and flying time involved. However, El Al, the Israeli national carrier, was able to operate flights between the two cities via Nairobi.

The cultural and demographic ties between the two countries also manifested in sports. According to Itamar Dubinsky, Israeli sports institutions and athletes circumvented the sports sanctions against the apartheid regime because of professional, Zionist, and national interests.

"Israel and South Africa have one thing above all else in common: they are both situated in a predominantly hostile world inhabited by dark peoples."

— Official yearbook of the South African government, 1978

==== Military cooperation ====
In the 1970s, Israel aided the National Liberation Front of Angola proxy forces organized and trained by South Africa and the CIA to forestall the formation of a government led by the MPLA during the Angolan Civil War. Israel sent a plane full of 120 mm shells sent via Zaire to the FNLA and Unita and a shipment of 50 SA-7 missiles.

By 1973, an economic and military alliance between Israel and South Africa was in the ascendancy. The military leadership of both countries was convinced that both nations faced a fundamentally similar predicament, fighting for their survival against the common enemy of the PLO and the ANC. Within less than a decade, South Africa would be one of Israel's closest military and economic allies, whilst Israel would occupy the position of South Africa's closest military ally, and Israel had become the most important foreign arms supplier to the South African Defence Force (SADF).

In 1976, the 5th Conference of Non-Aligned Nations in Colombo, Sri Lanka, adopted a resolution calling for an oil embargo against France and Israel because of their arms sales to South Africa.

Israeli and South African intelligence chiefs held regular conferences with each other to share information on enemy weapons and training. The co-ordination between the Israel Defense Forces (IDF) and the SADF was unprecedented, with Israeli and South African generals giving each other unfettered access to each other's battlefields and military tactics, and Israel sharing with South Africa highly classified information about its missions, such as Operation Opera, which had previously only been reserved for the United States.

Israel was one of the most important allies in South Africa's weapons procurement during the years of PW Botha's regime.

During Operation Protea in 1981, the SADF made military history, as arguably the first user of modern drone technology, when it operated the Israeli IAI Scout drones in combat in Angola. They would only be used in combat by the Israel Defense Forces a year later during the 1982 Lebanon War and Operation Mole Cricket 19.

In 1981, Israeli Defence Minister Ariel Sharon visited South African forces in South West Africa for 10 days, later saying that South Africa needed more weapons to fight Soviet infiltration in the region.

===== Ballistic missile collaboration =====
The commanders of the South African Defense Force were present at the test-firings of Israel's Jericho ballistic missile system, where they stood alongside the IDF generals. Israel's ballistic missile system, the Jericho II missile, was subsequently licensed for production in South Africa as the RSA series of space launch vehicles and ballistic missiles. The RSA-3 was produced by the Houwteq (a discontinued division of Denel) company at Grabouw, 30 km east of Cape Town. Test launches were made from Overberg Test Range near Bredasdorp, 200 km east of Cape Town. Rooi Els was where the engine test facilities were located. Development continued even after South African renunciation of its nuclear weapons for use as a commercial satellite launcher.

The RSA-2 was a local copy of the Jericho II ballistic missile and the RSA-1 was a local copy of the Jericho II second stage for use as a mobile missile.

===== Alleged nuclear collaboration =====
From the mid-1970s, the two countries were allegedly involved in joint nuclear-weapons development and testing. According to Seymour Hersh, for example, the 1979 Vela incident was the third joint Israeli–South African nuclear test in the Indian Ocean. Richard Rhodes concludes the incident was an Israeli nuclear test, conducted in cooperation with South Africa, and that the United States administration deliberately obscured this fact in order to avoid complicating relations with Israel.

South Africa provided much of the yellowcake uranium that Israel required to develop its nuclear weapons. South Africa built its own nuclear bombs, possibly with Israeli assistance. Some Resolutions of the UN General Assembly in the early 1980s which condemned the cooperation between Israel and Apartheid South Africa, also mentioned nuclear collaboration. U.S. Intelligence believed that Israel participated in South African nuclear research projects and supplied advanced non-nuclear weapons technology to South Africa during the 1970s, while South Africa was developing its own atomic bombs. According to David Albright, "Faced with sanctions, South Africa began to organize clandestine procurement networks in Europe and the United States, and it began a long, secret collaboration with Israel." He goes on to say "A common question is whether Israel provided South Africa with weapons design assistance, although available evidence argues against significant cooperation."

Chris McGreal has written that "Israel provided expertise and technology that was central to South Africa's development of its nuclear bombs". In 2000, Dieter Gerhardt, Soviet spy and former commander in the South African Navy, stated that Israel agreed in 1974 to arm eight Jericho II missiles with "special warheads" for South Africa.

According to journalist Seymour Hersh, the 1979 Vela incident, was the third joint Israeli-South African nuclear weapons test in the Indian Ocean, and the Israelis had sent two IDF ships and "a contingent of Israeli military men and nuclear experts" for the test. Author Richard Rhodes also concludes the incident was an Israeli nuclear test, conducted in cooperation with South Africa, and that the United States administration deliberately obscured this fact in order to avoid complicating relations.

In 2010, The Guardian reported that newly declassified South African documents uncovered by academic Sasha Polakow-Suransky showed details of a meeting on 31 March 1975 between the two countries' defence ministers, at the time South African P. W. Botha and Israeli Shimon Peres, in which Peres purportedly offered South Africa "three sizes." The report suggested that the "three sizes" referred to nuclear warheads, but the deal never materialised. Backed by former minister Yossi Beilin, Peres said the allegations were untrue and based on a selective interpretation of the minutes. Former apartheid foreign minister Pik Botha, as well as various Israeli insiders and experts, also said the allegations were highly improbable. Later, in 1991, as apartheid was drawing to a close, Botha continued to maintain that allegations of nuclear cooperation were "a figment of the imagination of someone". Avner Cohen, author of Israel and the Bomb and The Worst-Kept Secret: Israel's Bargain with the Bomb, said, "Nothing in the documents suggests there was an actual offer by Israel to sell nuclear weapons to the regime in Pretoria."

=== 1987–1994: Sanctions against South Africa ===
By 1987, Israel found itself the only developed nation in the world that still maintained strong relations with South Africa. Since 1974, this relationship had been mentioned and condemned by various international organisations and, several times, in the UN General Assembly. Thus by the late 1980s foreign policy towards South Africa had become a matter of disagreement within the Israeli government. A minority of Israeli officials and a number of liberal intellectuals, led by Yossi Beilin at the Foreign Ministry, pressed for greater distance and even harsh sanctions. They were reportedly opposed by, among others, Defense Minister Yitzhak Rabin, and former Defense Ministers Ezer Weizman, Moshe Arens, and Ariel Sharon. Foreign Minister Shimon Peres took the middle-ground view, saying that Israel would not "lead" an anti-South African campaign, but would follow the approach taken by the United States and Western Europe. Reinforcing the anti-apartheid argument was increasing political pressure from the United States, which had passed its Comprehensive Anti-Apartheid Act. In March 1987, American President Ronald Reagan was required to report to Congress on arms sales to South Africa by Israel and other American allies, and unfavourable findings could result in Israel losing its $1.8 billion in American military aid. The week before the report was due, Peres announced that Israel would not sign any further military contracts with South Africa. Existing contracts would remain in force but would be allowed to lapse over an unspecified period. Israel would also curtail its cultural, diplomatic, and tourist relations with South Africa, and would set up a committee to look into economic sanctions. Peres also reiterated Israel's opposition to apartheid, saying:

"There is no room for discrimination, whether it's called apartheid or any other name... We repeat that we express our denunciation of the system of apartheid. The Jewish outlook is that every man was born in the image of God and created equal."

According to the New York Times, the Israeli Cabinet "made no attempt to hide the fact" that its decision was being made in response to political pressure from the United States. South African Foreign Minister Pik Botha downplayed it as "clearly a direct result of pressure by the United States". In September 1987, under further American pressure and ahead of another review by Congress, Israel imposed ten economic and cultural sanctions against South Africa, including bans on new investments and on governmental, scientific, sports, and cultural exchanges. Israeli diplomat Alon Liel later recalled South African President P.W. Botha was surprised and outraged by the decision. However, because the sanctions did not apply retroactively to agreements already made, some exchanges continued – for example, in 1990, bilateral trade was worth $317 million, with Israel incurring a $125 million trade deficit because of the restrictions on its exports to South Africa.

=== 1991–1994: Normalisation ===
The sanctions remained in place until negotiations to end apartheid were underway in South Africa: on July 14, 1991, Israel lifted its sanctions, four days after the United States had done the same. In November of that year, Botha's successor, F.W. De Klerk made a state visit to Israel, and he and Israeli Prime Minister Yitzhak Shamir agreed to normalise relations. During that visit, the countries' foreign ministers – Pik Botha in South Africa and David Levy in Israel – signed a memorandum of understanding to facilitate increased cooperation in science, culture, industry, agriculture, tourism, commerce, and other fields. Botha said publicly that neither the agreement nor general Israeli–South African relations would include military cooperation, because the latter "belong[ed] to the past". Over the next two years, there was reportedly strain between the Israeli embassy in South Africa and De Klerk's government, as the Israeli ambassador focused his diplomatic and political outreach on the ascendant black leaders of the ANC.

== 1994–2018: Post-apartheid strain ==
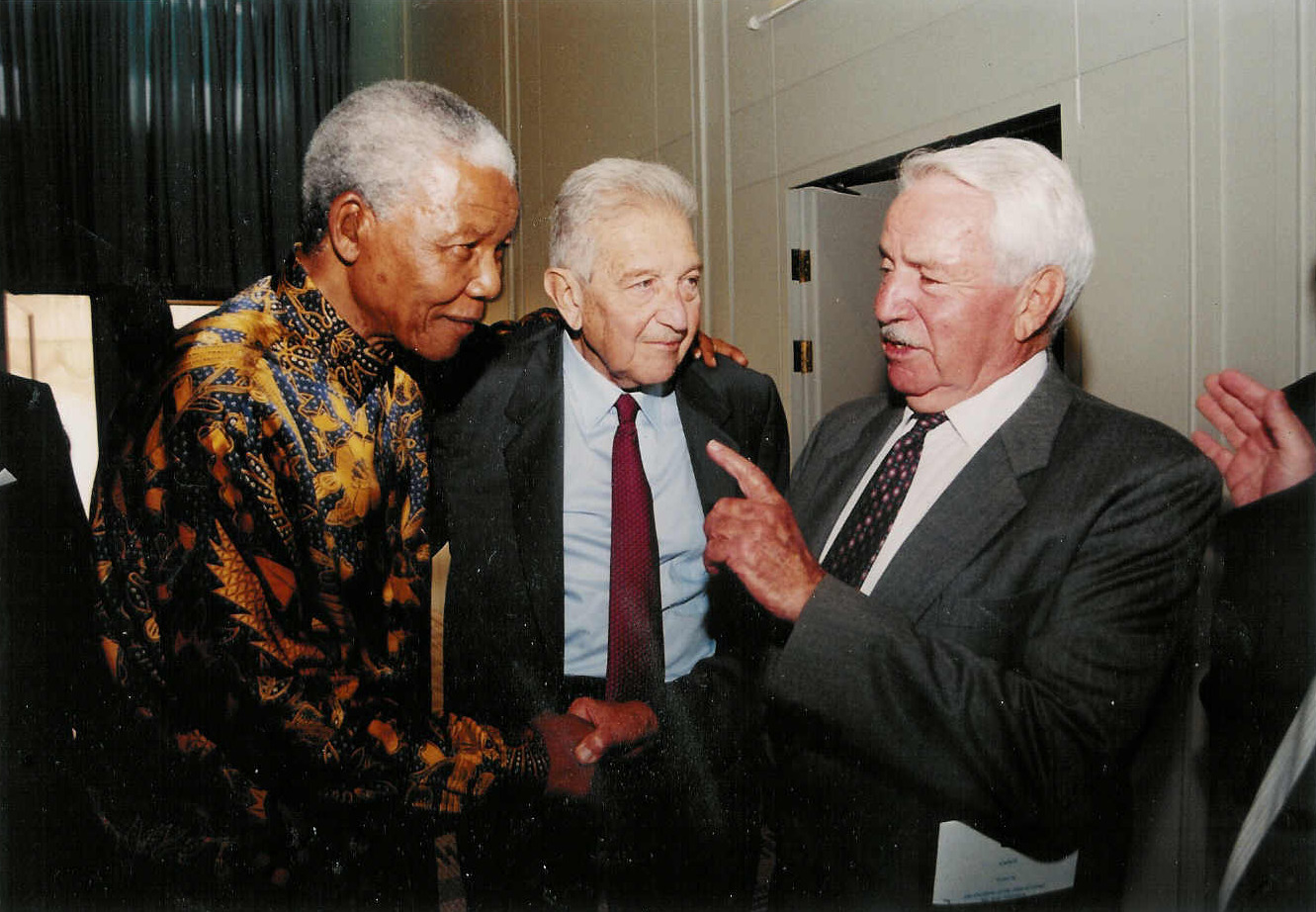
Former South African President Nelson Mandela with Israeli President Ezer Weizmann and Syd Cohen of the Israeli Air Force, 1999.

In 1994, South Africa held its first democratic elections, and Nelson Mandela was elevated to the presidency. In a speech in August 1993, Mandela had said that his party, the ANC, had been "extremely unhappy" with the apartheid-era Israel–South Africa connection, but was willing to move past it, including in seeking a resolution to the longstanding Israeli–Palestinian conflict:

"As a movement, we recognize the legitimacy of Palestinian nationalism just as we recognize the legitimacy of Zionism as a Jewish nationalism... We insist on the right of the state of Israel to exist within secure borders, but with equal vigor, support the Palestinian right to national self-determination."

In September 1995, South African Foreign Minister Alfred Nzo made an official visit to Israel, where the countries signed an agreement establishing a Joint Commission of Cooperation. The next year, the commission negotiated five bilateral cooperation agreements, in the areas of agriculture, tourism, culture, environment and science, and nature conservation. In November 1995, Mandela and other ANC leaders attended a memorial service for Rabin, who had been assassinated while serving as Israeli Prime Minister. Although Yasser Arafat of Palestine first visited South Africa in 1998, and several times thereafter, Mandela did not visit Israel while president. He noted that, although he had received invitations to visit Israel during his presidency, "almost every country in the world, except Israel" had invited him to visit after his release from prison in 1990. He finally visited Israel in October 1999, during a tour of the Levant. He reiterated his unwavering opposition to Israeli control of Gaza, the West Bank, Golan Heights, and Southern Lebanon, but also said:

"To the many people who have questioned why I came, I say: Israel worked very closely with the apartheid regime. I say: I've made peace with many men who slaughtered our people like animals. Israel cooperated with the apartheid regime, but it did not participate in any atrocities."

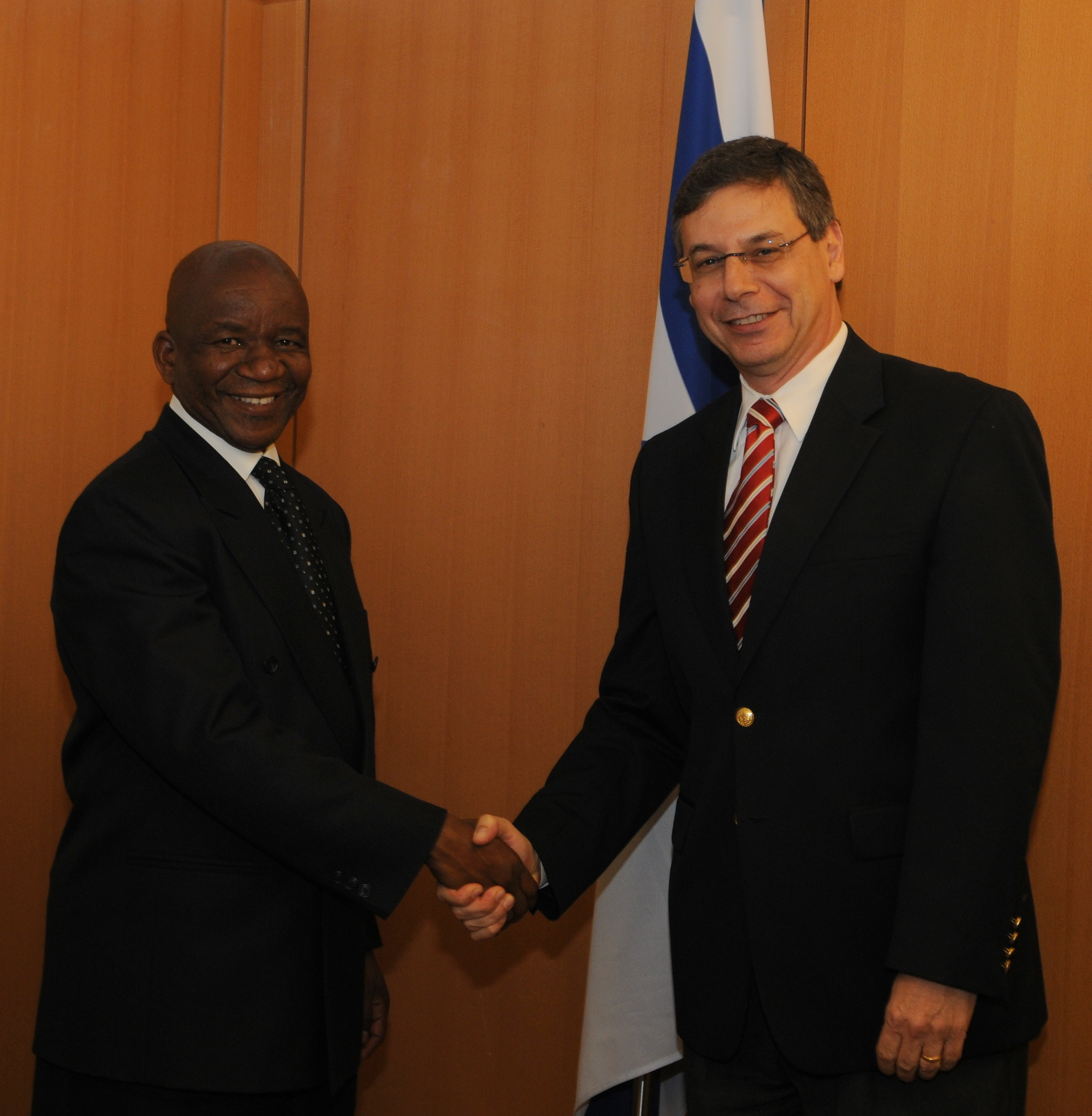
Israeli Deputy Foreign Minister Danny Ayalon meets with Jerry Matjila, South African Director General for Foreign Affairs, September 2009.

In late 2004, South African President Thabo Mbeki held a series of bilateral talks focused on the Israeli–Palestinian conflict, hosting a delegation from Israel's governing Likud in September, and then in October Israeli Deputy Prime Minister Ehud Olmert. This followed a particularly tense phase in relations: earlier that year, the South African government had criticised Israel's construction of the Israeli West Bank barrier, and an official delegation led by Deputy Foreign Minister Aziz Pahad had made representations in support of the Palestinian case at the International Court of Justice.

== Economic relations (1992-2015) ==
After the end of apartheid, trade between Israel and South Africa increased, from $387.8 million in 1992 and $474.7 million in 1994, to $706.4 million in 2000. It reached $1.03 billion in 2010, by which time Israel was South Africa's 40th largest source of imports and 24th largest destination for exports. South Africa was Israel's main trading partner in Africa between 2006 and 2016, with its imports from South Africa dominated by diamonds and coal. However, after peaking at $1.19 billion in 2012, bilateral trade began to decline. In 2019, bilateral trade amounted to only $407.7 million, with a trade imbalance of $19.5 million in South Africa's favour.

Israel and South Africa signed a bilateral investment treaty in 2004, which included provisions for most favoured nation treatment, but it lapsed in 2014. In 2015, according to the South African Reserve Bank, the stock of Israeli foreign direct investment in South Africa was worth R2.93 billion, or 0.15% of all foreign investment in South Africa.

== BDS in South Africa ==
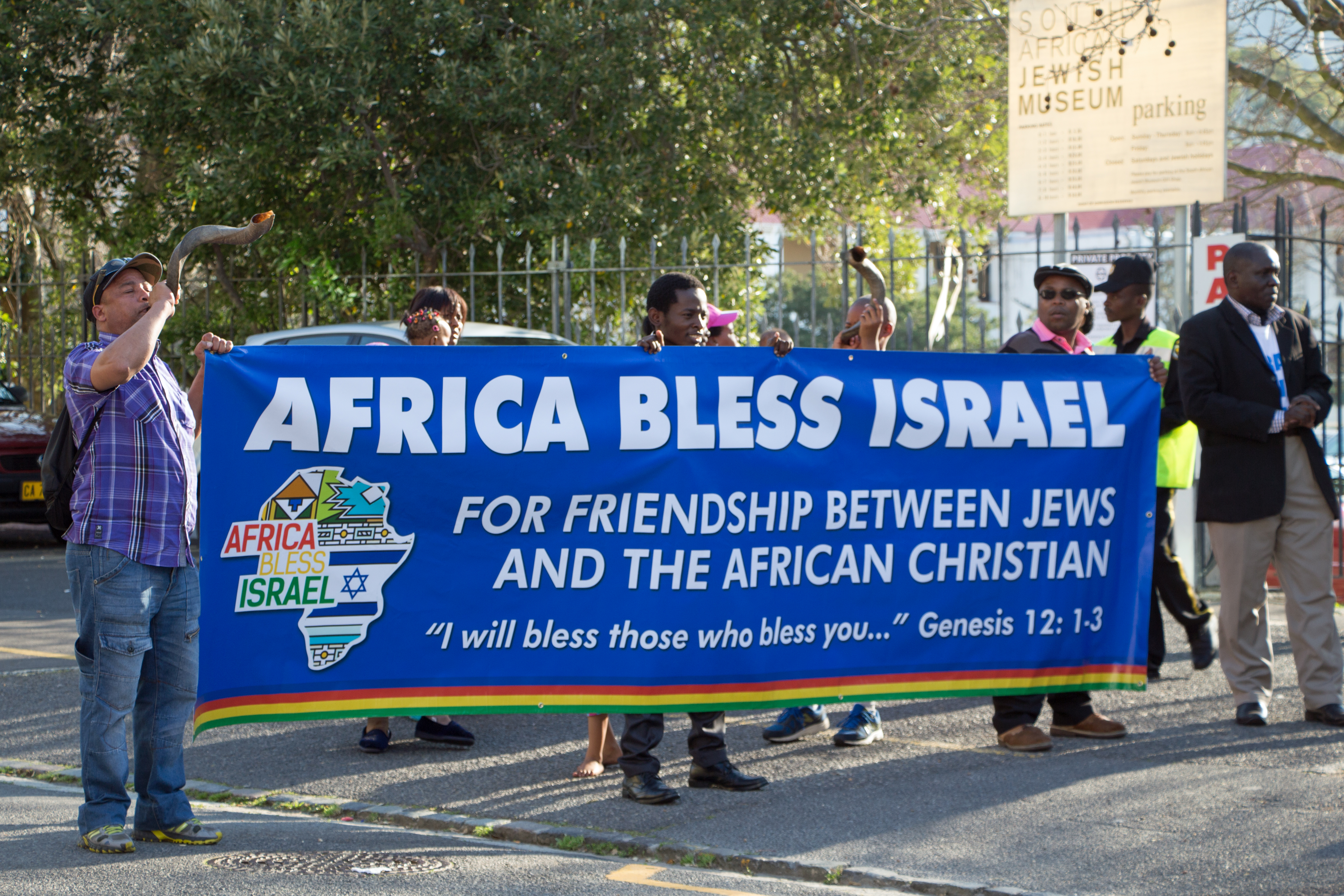
A pro-Israel solidarity rally outside the South African Jewish Museum in Cape Town, August 2014.

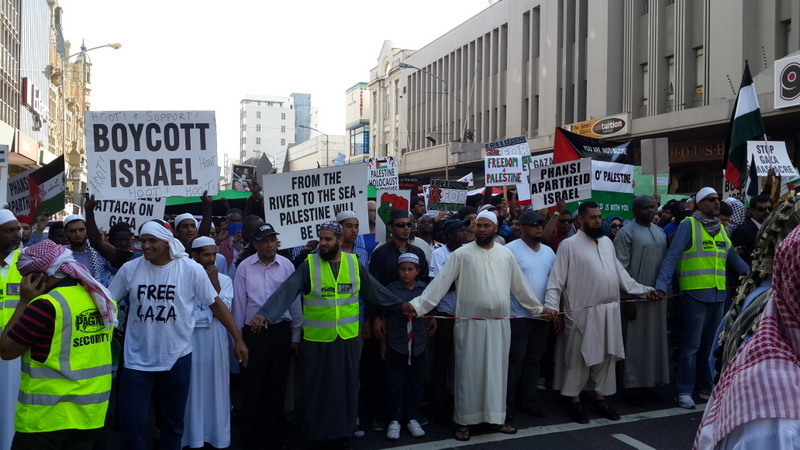
A protest in Durban against Israeli bombardment of Gaza during the 2014 Gaza War.

An additional contributor to tensions between Israel and South Africa over the past two decades has been high-level political support in South Africa for the pro-Palestinian Boycott, Divestment and Sanctions campaign. As early as June 2006, the Congress of South African Trade Unions – then the largest union federation in South Africa, and a close partner of the ruling ANC – declared its support for boycotts of Israel, calling the latter an apartheid state. In September 2011, due to lobbying by Zackie Achmat and his pro-Palestinian Open Shuhuda Street organisation, South African Trade and Industry Minister, Rob Davies, "agreed in principle" that imports manufactured in occupied Palestinian territories should not be labelled as products of Israel, in order to facilitate voluntary boycotts of Israeli goods under BDS. At its 2012 elective conference, the ANC formally resolved to support the BDS campaign. The academic boycott of Israel in South Africa led to the dissolution of a partnership between the University of Johannesburg and Ben-Gurion University in 2011.

== South African criticism of Israeli occupation ==
Although a 2007 public opinion poll found mixed opinions among the South African population, some prominent South African figures, such as Desmond Tutu and Cabinet minister Ronnie Kasrils, have long been vocal critics of Israel's actions during the ongoing Israeli–Palestinian conflict, sometimes drawing parallels between apartheid South Africa and modern-day Israel. Others, such as opposition politician Kenneth Meshoe, have objected to such comparisons; and South Africa's former ambassador to Israel, Fumanekile Gqiba, was more ambivalent, concluding, "It’s difficult to say Israel is racist, in a classic sense. I will say a certain culture is dominant over the others – the Ashkenazi culture seems to dominate the systems of authority." In any case, more recently, both the ruling ANC and its government have been willing to endorse openly an analogy between Israel and South African apartheid.

Other prominent South African anti-apartheid activists have used apartheid comparisons to criticize the occupation of the West Bank, and particularly the construction of the separation barrier. These include Farid Esack, a writer who is currently William Henry Bloomberg Visiting professor at Harvard Divinity School, Ronnie Kasrils, Winnie Madikizela-Mandela, Denis Goldberg, and Arun Ghandhi,

In 2008, a delegation of African National Congress (ANC) veterans visited Israel and the Occupied Territories, and said that in some respects it was worse than apartheid. In May 2018, in the aftermath of the Gaza border protests, the ANC issued a statement comparing the actions of Palestinians to "our struggle against the apartheid regime". It also accused the Israeli military of "the same cruelty" as Hitler, and stated that "all South Africans must rise up and treat Israel like the pariah that it is". Around the same time, the South African government withdrew indefinitely its Ambassador to Israel, Sisa Ngombane, to protest "the indiscriminate and grave manner of the latest Israeli attack".

Into the 2010s, these views increasingly led to diplomatic spats. South Africa has consistently supported anti-Israel resolutions at the UN. Following the 2010 Gaza flotilla raid, South Africa recalled its ambassador from Israel, and summoned the Israeli ambassador for a reprimand. In 2013, Maite Nkoana-Mashabane, the South African Minister of International Relations and Cooperation, said that South Africa had not been sending its ministers to Israel, having decided "to slow down and curtail senior leadership contact with that regime until things begin to look better". Later that year, Israeli Prime Minister Benjamin Netanyahu cancelled his planned trip to South Africa for Mandela's funeral. In April 2015, Israel denied South African Higher Education Minister Blade Nzimande and his aides permission to visit the Palestinian government in Ramallah, provoking an angry response from Nzimande. And, later that year, the governing ANC in South Africa angered Israel by hosting a delegation from militant Palestinian nationalist group Hamas, which met with South African President Jacob Zuma – though in his capacity as ANC party leader – and signed a memorandum of understanding with the ANC about ending Israel's occupation of Palestinian territories. In response, the Israeli foreign ministry summoned South Africa's deputy ambassador for a reprimand.

== 2018–2023: Downgraded relations ==
Following an apparent détente in 2017, on 14 May 2018, South Africa withdrew its ambassador indefinitely following the 2018 Gaza border protests. In a statement, its Department of International Relations and Cooperation reiterated South Africa's "view that the Israeli Defence Force must withdraw from the Gaza Strip and bring to an end the violent and destructive incursions into Palestinian territories." In a less restrained statement the following day, the ANC called "on all South Africans to demonstrate to the world that we regard the Israeli government and its armed forces as an outcast and blight on humanity." The ambassador returned to Tel Aviv in September of that year, but, in April 2019, the South African foreign minister, Lindiwe Sisulu, announced that the ambassador would not be replaced when his term ended, and the Tel Aviv embassy would be downgraded to a liaison office. This downgrade had earlier been endorsed as the official policy of the ANC by delegates to its December 2017 elective conference.

Since their unilateral downgrading by South Africa, diplomatic relations between the countries have remained strained. In 2021, South Africa's Department of Sports, Arts and Culture withdrew its support from the Miss South Africa pageant after the latter refused to boycott the Miss Universe event in Eilat, Israel. In 2021 and late 2022, South Africa, alongside Algeria, spearheaded an unsuccessful campaign to strip Israel of its observer status at the African Union. And the South African government continued publicly to criticise Israeli actions and express solidarity with Palestine in the Israel–Palestine conflict, frequently reiterating its support for a peaceful two-state solution. In June 2021, however, South African foreign minister Naledi Pandor told the South African Parliament that the government did not intend to sever relations entirely, and her department said in early 2022 that ongoing diplomatic contact "allowed South Africa to play a role with its international partners in the ongoing efforts to end the occupation of Palestine". Israel currently retains its embassy in Pretoria, and South African President Cyril Ramaphosa accepted the credentials of its current ambassador, Eliav Belotsercovsky, in January 2022. The South African Department of International Relations summarises the prevailing situation as follows:

"There is currently limited political and diplomatic interaction between South Africa and Israel, mainly due to Israel’s antagonistic attitude towards the MEPP [Middle East peace process] and disregard for International Law regarding the rights of the Palestinians and their territories. South Africa’s baseline is that Israel must return to negotiations and create favorable conditions for peaceful negotiations."

== First months of the Israel-Gaza war (2023) ==
During the Gaza war, the South African government called on the world to use their influence against what the South African Foreign Minister Naledi Pandor described as "this real crime against humanity", a day later the African National Congress passed a motion calling on the government to close its embassy in Tel Aviv. The South African governmental cabinet also called on the International Criminal Court to issue an arrest warrant for Israeli Prime Minister Benjamin Netanyahu and recalled the country's ambassador to Israel and withdrew all the country's diplomatic staff from Israel. The Minister in the Presidency, Khumbudzo Ntshavheni also said, at the time, that the Israeli ambassador to South Africa had made "disparaging remarks" about those opposing "atrocities and genocide of the Israeli government."

On November 21, the South African Parliament voted, by 248–91, in favor of an Economic Freedom Fighters parliamentary motion, which called on the Israeli embassy in South Africa to be closed and for South Africa to end diplomatic relations with Israel until Israel agrees to a ceasefire in Gaza. Prior to the vote, Israel recalled its ambassador from South Africa "for consultations" On November 22, South African President Cyril Ramaphosa welcomed the six-day ceasefire and expressed hope that it would bolster efforts to achieve an "outright end to the current conflict." In March 2024, Naledi Pandor stated that South African citizens who had gone to Gaza to fight for Israel would be arrested upon their return to South Africa.

== 2023–24 genocide case ==
International stances on South Africa v. Israel lawsuit: South Africa Countries that have supported South Africa Countries that have supported Israel Israel

On December 29, South Africa filed a case against Israel, for committing genocide, war crimes, and crimes against humanity against Palestinians in Gaza during the Israel-Gaza conflict, at the International Court of Justice. Proceedings were instituted at the International Court of Justice pursuant to the Genocide Convention, to which both Israel and South Africa are signatory, and brought pursuant to Article IX of the Convention. In the country's 84-page application, filed on December 29, 2023, South Africa alleged that Israel's actions "are genocidal in character because they are intended to bring about the destruction of a substantial part of the Palestinian national, racial and ethnical group." South Africa requested that the ICJ issue a binding legal order on an interim basis (i.e., prior to a hearing on the merits of the application), requiring Israel to "immediately suspend its military operations in and against Gaza." While adjudication of the merits of the case may take years, such an order could be issued within weeks. Additionally, South Africa's president Cyril Ramaphosa also compared Israel's actions to apartheid.

Balkees Jarrah, associate international justice director at Human Rights Watch, noted that the ICJ case is not a prosecution of individuals, and does not directly involve the International Criminal Court, which is a separate body, and stated that the case presents an opportunity to "provide clear, definitive answers on the question of whether Israel is committing genocide against the Palestinian people." Israel rejected the allegations "with disgust" and accused South Africa of working with Hamas, describing the actions of South Africa as "blood libel", and called Palestinians "the modern heirs of the Nazis". On January 2, 2024, Israel decided to appear before the ICJ in response to the case made by South Africa that Israel was committing genocide, despite a prior history of ignoring international tribunals. South Africa's case has been supported by Malaysia and Turkey, and peace groups such as CodePink, World Beyond War, RootsAction, and The People’s Forum, which urged over 25 countries to support South Africa's case, while U.S. National Security Council Coordinator for Strategic Communications John Kirby said the U.S. found the "submission meritless, counterproductive, completely without any basis in fact whatsoever."

== 2026 diplomatic incident ==
On 30 January 2026, South Africa declared Ariel Seidman, Israeli chargé d’affaires, persona non grata and ordered him to leave the country within 72 hours. South African authorities said the decision was due to repeated breaches of diplomatic protocol, including public remarks seen as insulting President Cyril Ramaphosa and failure to properly notify the government about visits by Israeli officials. Israeli Prime Minister Benjamin Netanyahu criticized the move as politically motivated and said Israel would retaliate by declaring South Africa’s senior diplomat in Israel persona non grata as well.

== See also ==
- History of the Jews in South Africa
- South African Jews in Israel
- Jewish resistance to apartheid
- Military history of South Africa
- Antisemitism in South Africa
- Muldergate

== Bibliography ==
=== Books and articles ===
- Bishku, Michael B. (2010). "South Africa and the Middle East". Middle East Policy. 17 (3): 153–174. doi:10.1111/j.1475-4967.2010.00457.x.
- Byrnes, Rita M. (1996). "Relations With Other Countries: Israel". South Africa: A Country Study. Washington, D.C.: Government Publishing Office for the Library of Congress.
- Chazan, Naomi (1983). "The Fallacies of Pragmatism: Israeli Foreign Policy towards South Africa". African Affairs. 82 (327): 169–199. doi:10.1093/oxfordjournals.afraf.a097506. ISSN 0001-9909. JSTOR 721403.
- Giladi, Rotem (2017). "Negotiating Identity: Israel, Apartheid, and the United Nations, 1949–1952". The English Historical Review. 132 (559): 1440–1472. doi:10.1093/ehr/cex372. hdl:10138/299177. ISSN 0013-8266.
- Gruzd, Steven; Rawhani, Carmel; Benjamin, Larry (2018). "A Focus on Ethiopia, Kenya, Nigeria and South Africa". Israel's Ties With Africa: A Focus on Ethiopia, Kenya, Nigeria and South Africa. Vol. 284. South African Institute of International Affairs. pp. 1–36.
- Haron, Muhammed (1997). "South Africa–Middle Eastern Relations". Digest of Middle East Studies. 6 (4): 1–24. doi:10.1111/j.1949-3606.1997.tb00760.x.
- Hersh, Seymour (1991). The Samson Option: Israel's Nuclear Arsenal and American Foreign Policy. Random House. ISBN 0-394-57006-5. OCLC 24609770.
- Hunter, Jane (1986). "Israel and the Bantustans". Journal of Palestine Studies. 15 (3): 53–89. doi:10.2307/2536750. ISSN 0377-919X. JSTOR 2536750.
- Husain, Azim (1982). "The West, South Africa and Israel: A Strategic Triangle". Third World Quarterly. 4 (1): 44–73. doi:10.1080/01436598208419607. ISSN 0143-6597. JSTOR 3991507.
- Levey, Zach (2004). "Israel's Strategy in Africa, 1961–67". International Journal of Middle East Studies. 36 (1): 71–87. doi:10.1017/S0020743804361040. ISSN 0020-7438. JSTOR 3880138. S2CID 153752886.
- Lissoni, Arianna (2015). "Apartheid's 'Little Israel': Bophuthatswana". In Jacobs, Sean; Soske, Jon (eds.). Apartheid Israel: The Politics of an Analogy. Chicago, Illinois: Haymarket Books. ISBN 978-1-60846-519-4. OCLC 931160029.
- Marmont, Jean-Jacques (1989). "Israel and the Socio-Economic Status of South Africa's Jewish Community". The Journal of Modern African Studies. 27 (1): 143–152. doi:10.1017/S0022278X00015688. ISSN 0022-278X. JSTOR 161360. S2CID 154488945.
- Nadelmann, Ethan A. (1981). "Israel and Black Africa: A Rapprochement?". The Journal of Modern African Studies. 19 (2): 183–219. doi:10.1017/S0022278X00016918. ISSN 0022-278X. JSTOR 160635. S2CID 154660695.
- Neuberger, Benyamin (2009). Israel's Relations With the Third World (1948–2008) (PDF). Tel Aviv: S. Daniel Abraham Center for International and Regional Studies, Tel Aviv University. OCLC 637496259.
- Pew Research Center (2007). "Spring 2007 Survey" (PDF). Pew Global Attitudes Project. Archived from the original (PDF) on 14 December 2009.
- Polakow-Suransky, Sasha (2010). The Unspoken Alliance: Israel's Secret Relationship With Apartheid South Africa. Random House. ISBN 978-1-77009-840-4. OCLC 656825836.
- Purkitt, Helen E.; Burgess, Stephen F. (2005). South Africa's Weapons of Mass Destruction. Indiana University Press. ISBN 978-0-253-00306-5.
- Rhodes, Richard (2011). Twilight of the Bombs: Recent Challenges, New Dangers, and the Prospects for a World Without Nuclear Weapons. Random House. ISBN 978-0-307-38741-7.
- Rubin, Leslie (1957). "Afrikaner Nationalism and the Jews" (PDF). Africa South. 1 (29): 28–34 – via South African History Online.
- Shimoni, Gideon (2003). "Coping with Israel's Intrusion". Community and Conscience: The Jews in Apartheid South Africa. Lebanon, New Hampshire: Brandeis University Press. ISBN 1-58465-329-9. LCCN 20034623.
- Stevens, Richard P. (1971). "Zionism, South Africa and Apartheid: The Paradoxical Triangle". Phylon. 32 (2): 123–142. doi:10.2307/273998. ISSN 0031-8906. JSTOR 273998.
- Study Commission on U.S. Policy Toward Southern Africa (1981). South Africa: Time Running Out. University of California Press. ISBN 9780520045477.

=== News ===
- Anon. (25 September 1963). "Israel Calls Envoy From South Africa". The New York Times. ISSN 0362-4331.
- Anon. (12 February 1978). "South African to Visit Israel". The New York Times. ISSN 0362-4331.
- Anon. (22 June 1978). "10 Envoys in South Africa Shunning the Whites-Only Premiere of 'Golda'". The New York Times.
- Anon. (6 November 1984). "South African, on 'Private Visit,' Meets with Shamir in Jerusalem". The New York Times. ISSN 0362-4331.
- Anon. (5 June 1985). "Foreign Ministry Opposed to Bophuthatswana Office in Israel". AP News.
- Anon. (8 November 1995). "South Africa: Mandela Attends Memorial Service For Rabin". Associated Press.
- Anon. (24 February 2004). "South Africa: Barrier Seizes Land". Al Jazeera.
- Anon. (7 September 2004). "Mbeki Welcomes Israeli Likud". News24.
- Anon. (3 June 2010). "South Africa Recalls Israeli Ambassador Over Flotilla Raid". CNN.
- Anon. (2 November 2013). "South African Minister: 'The Palestinian Struggle is Our Struggle'". Times of Israel.
- Anon. (26 August 2014). "Cosatu to Intensify Israeli Goods Boycott". News24.
- Anon. (25 August 2017). "First-Ever Delegation of MKs Visits South Africa". Times of Israel.
- Ahren, Raphael (28 April 2015). "South African Jews Slam Israel for Banning Minister". Times of Israel.
- Ahren, Raphael (19 October 2015). "Jerusalem Fumes as South Africa Hosts Hamas Chiefs". Times of Israel.
- Ahren, Raphael (22 September 2016). "In Sign of Thaw, Israel's Top Diplomat Meets S. African Foreign Minister". Times of Israel.
- Ahren, Raphael (6 November 2017). "In Thaw, Israeli Minister Meets South African Counterparts". Times of Israel.
- Ahren, Raphael (21 December 2017). "South Africa's Ruling Party Resolves to Downgrade Embassy in Israel". Times of Israel.
- Ahren, Raphael (23 September 2018). "South Africa Quietly Returns Its Ambassador to Israel". Times of Israel.
- Ahren, Raphael (10 March 2019). "South Africa 'In the Process' of Downgrading Israel Embassy, President Says". Times of Israel.
- Belling, Susan (2 October 1999). "Mandela Bears Message of Peace in First Visit to Israel". The Jewish News Weekly of Northern California. Archived from the original on 30 September 2007.
- Bernstein, Edgar (1950). "Union of South Africa". The American Jewish Year Book. 51: 288–298. ISSN 0065-8987. JSTOR 23603767.
- Bernstein, Edgar (1952). "Union of South Africa". The American Jewish Year Book. 53: 387–398. ISSN 0065-8987. JSTOR 23604752.
- Dasgupta, Sravasti (16 November 2021). "South Africa Shuns Beauty Queen Over Miss Universe Pageant in Israel". The Independent.
- Draper, Peter (15 November 2017). "Bilateral Ties with Israel Benefit SA More Than Mere Numbers Suggest". Business Day.
- Fabricius, Peter (30 January 2022). "SA Government Claims It Has Been Consistent on the Palestine Question". Daily Maverick.
- Fabricius, Peter (2 February 2022). "South Africa Leads Charge to Cancel Israel's Observer Status at the African Union". Daily Maverick.
- Felix, Jason (7 June 2021). "SA Condemns Middle East Conflict But Won't Cut Ties With Israel, Pandor Tells Parliament". News24.
- Frankel, Glenn (17 September 1987). "Israel Imposes Sanctions on South Africa". Washington Post. ISSN 0190-8286.
- Freudenheim, Milt; Roberts, Katherine; Clarity, James F. (22 March 1987). "Israel Loosens Ties With Pretoria". The New York Times. ISSN 0362-4331.
- Friedman, Thomas L. (29 January 1987). "Israelis Reassess Supplying Arms to South Africa". The New York Times. ISSN 0362-4331.
- Friedman, Thomas L. (19 March 1987). "Israel Will Curb Arms For Pretoria". The New York Times. ISSN 0362-4331.
- Friedman, Thomas L. (17 September 1987). "Israel Approves Curbs on Pretoria". The New York Times. ISSN 0362-4331.
- Gordin, Jeremy (21 December 2012). "South Africa's Ruling Party Endorses BDS Campaign Against Israel". Haaretz.
- Haberman, Clyde (12 June 1994). "Israel Fears A.N.C. Backlash on Support for Old South Africa". The New York Times. ISSN 0362-4331.
- Hofmann, Paul (5 July 1971). "Israel's Offer to Aid Blacks Irks South Africa". The New York Times.
- Jewish Telegraphic Agency (15 November 1962). "Golda Meir Defends Israel's Condemnation of South Africa at U.N." Daily News Bulletin.
- Jewish Telegraphic Agency (22 June 1978). "Meir Supports Boycott of Whites Only Showing of Play 'Golda' in S. Africa". Daily News Bulletin.
- Jewish Telegraphic Agency (27 June 1984). "Special Report Envoy Says Israeli Relations with S. Africa Overblown by Detractors". Daily News Bulletin.
- Jewish Telegraphic Agency (12 November 1991). "De Klerk Visit Means Relations with South Africa Again 'Kosher'". Daily News Bulletin.
- Kasrils, Ronnie (6 June 2007). "Speech to Parliament: The Palestine–Israeli Issue". South African Government.
- Khumalo, Thuso (21 October 2015). "Hamas Ends South Africa Visit". Deutsche Welle.
- Lowenberg, Helmuth (1950). "Israel". The American Jewish Year Book. 51: 389–406. ISSN 0065-8987. JSTOR 23603788.
- Macharia, James (21 December 2017). "South Africa's ANC Decides on Israel Embassy Downgrade Ahead of Jerusalem Vote". Reuters.
- Madisha, Willie (6 June 2006). "South African Trade Union Congress Supports CUPE Boycott of Israel". Connexions.
- Mataboge, Mmanaledi (9 December 2013). "Netanyahu raises suspicion, cancels Mandela funeral trip". The Mail & Guardian.
- Melman, Yossi (23 September 2003). "S. African Interior Minister: Israel Is Not Apartheid". Haaretz.
- Meshoe, Kenneth (15 May 2013). "Pro-Palestinian Ads Misrepresent Apartheid". San Francisco Examiner.
- Mitchley, Alex (14 November 2021). "Govt. Withdraws Support for Miss SA Ahead of Miss Universe Pageant in Israel". News24.
- Mizroch, Amir (2 November 2006). "Late SA President P.W. Botha Felt Israel Had Betrayed Him". The Jerusalem Post.
- Mthethwa, Cebelihle (27 January 2022). "SA Maintains Diplomatic Ties with Israel, While Still Supporting Palestinians – Dirco". News24.
- Oneko, Sello; Schwikowski, Martina (8 April 2019). "Israel and South Africa: A 'Downgraded' Relationship?". Deutsche Welle.
- Orme, William A. (20 October 1999). "Mandela Visits Israel With Praise but Rifts Linger". The New York Times. ISSN 0362-4331.
- O'Sullivan, Arieh (12 November 1991). "Israel, South Africa Sign Cooperation Pact; De Klerk Tours Holy Sites". AP News.
- Pollak, Joel (22 September 2007). "An interview with Major General Gqiba". Harvard Law Record.
- Ramaphosa, Cyril (17 May 2021). "Letter on the Palestine–Israel conflict". The Mail & Guardian.
- Rawoot, Ilham (16 September 2011). "Move to Relabel 'Israeli' Goods as Bads". The Mail & Guardian.
- "South African President Mbeki Meets With Deputy PM Olmert". Haaretz. Reuters. 22 October 2004.
- Shain, Milton (1997). "South Africa". The American Jewish Year Book. 97: 416–427. ISSN 0065-8987. JSTOR 23606076.
- Sulzberger, C. L. (30 April 1971). "Strange Nonalliance". The New York Times. ISSN 0362-4331.
- Sydow, Christoph (12 June 2013). "Nelson Mandela's Gegner: "Dieser Schwarze Terrorist"". Der Spiegel (in German).
- Tutu, Desmond (29 April 2002). "Apartheid in the Holy Land". The Guardian. London.

=== Official ===
- African National Congress (15 May 2018). "ANC Condemns Israeli Massacre of Innocent Palestinians". Archived from the original on 16 May 2018.
- Department of Information (1978). Official Yearbook of the Republic of South Africa. Vol. 5. South African State Department of Information. ISBN 978-0-621-04865-0.
- Department of International Relations and Cooperation (14 May 2018). "South Africa Withdraws Its Ambassador to Israel Following Israel's Deadly Attack in the Gaza Strip". Media Statements.
- Department of International Relations and Cooperation (28 July 2021). "South Africa Objects to the African Union Commission Decision to Grant Israel Observer Status". Media Statements.
- Department of International Relations and Cooperation (29 November 2021). "Statement by the Government of the Republic of South Africa on the International Day of Solidarity with the Palestinian People". Media Statements.
- Department of International Relations and Cooperation (4 March 2022). "State of Israel". Bilateral Relations of the Republic of South Africa.
- Department of International Relations and Cooperation (24 April 2022). "South Africa Expresses Concern at Developments in Jerusalem". Media Statements.
- United Nations Conference on Trade and Development (2016). "Israel – South Africa BIT (2004)". UNCTAD Investment Policy Hub.
- United Nations General Assembly (29 November 1947). "A/RES/181(II)[A] of 1947: Future Government of Palestine". United Nations Digital Library.
- United Nations General Assembly (14 May 1949). "A/RES/265(III) of 1949: Treatment of People of Indian Origin in the Union of South Africa". United Nations Digital Library.
- United Nations General Assembly (6 November 1962). "A/RES/1761(XVII) of 1962: The Policies of Apartheid of the Government of the Republic of South Africa". United Nations Digital Library.
- United Nations General Assembly (27 October 1966). "A/RES/2145(XXI): Question of South West Africa". United Nations Digital Library.
- World Bank (1992). "South Africa Trade By Partner". WITS.
- World Bank (1994). "South Africa Trade By Partner". WITS.
- World Bank (2000). "South Africa Trade By Partner". WITS.
- World Bank (2010). "South Africa Trade By Partner". WITS.
- World Bank (2012). "South Africa Trade By Partner". WITS.
- World Bank (2019). "South Africa Trade By Partner". WITS.
