= Savyon =

Savyon סביון
- Local council

Hebrew transcription(s)
  - ISO 259: Sabyon
  - Also spelled: Savion (unofficial)
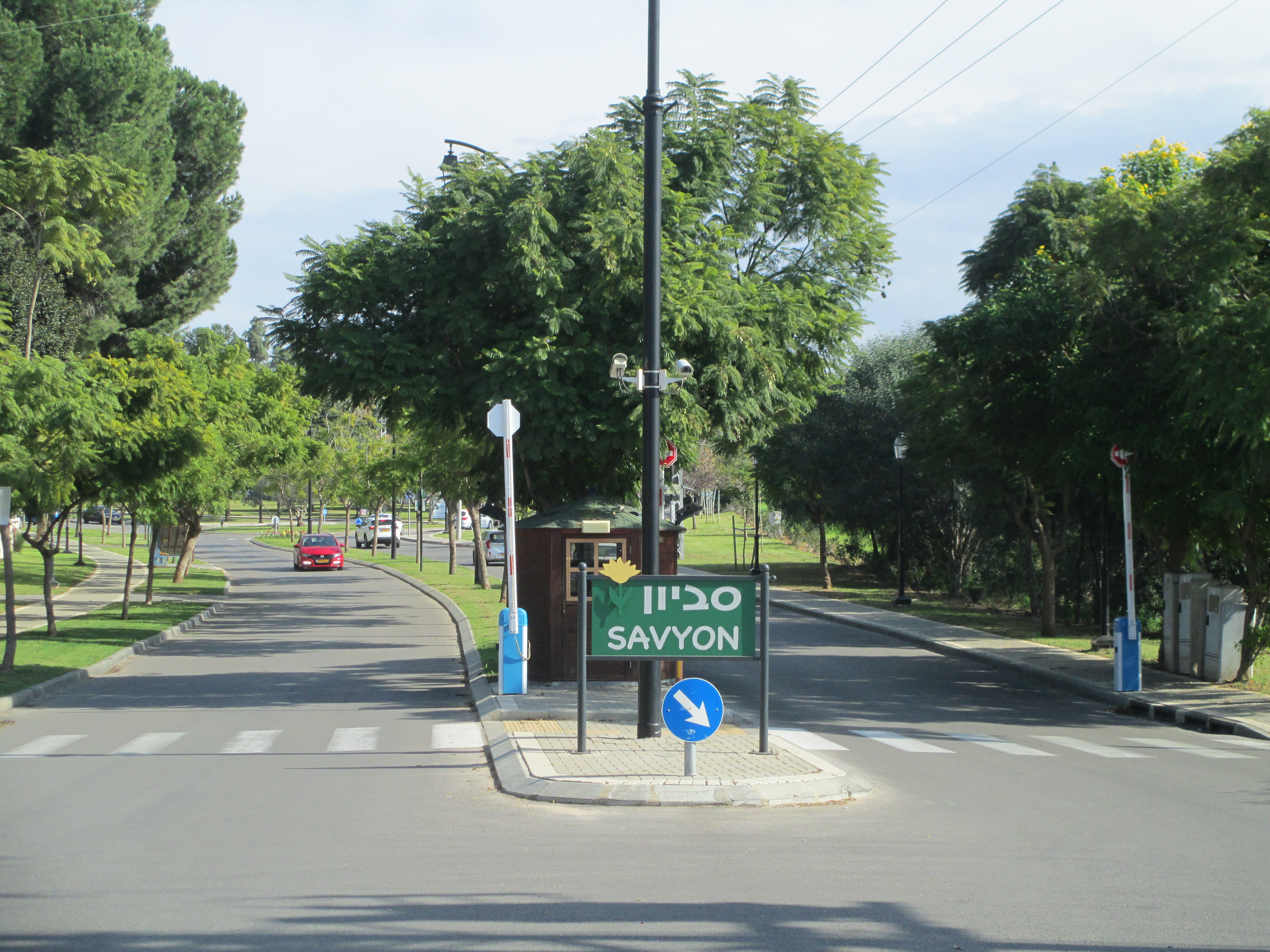

- Location within Central Israel Location within Israel
- Coordinates: 32°2′48″N 34°52′38″E
- Country: Israel
- District: Central
- Subdistrict: Petah Tikva
- Natural Region: Petah Tikva
- Founded: 1951

Government
  - Head of Municipality: Motti Landau

Area
  - Total: 3,746 dunams (3.746 km^{2}; 1.446 sq mi)

Population (2024)
  - Total: 4,405
  - Density: 1,176/km^{2} (3,046/sq mi)
- Name meaning: Eastern groundsel
- Website: www.savyon.muni.il

Savyon (Hebrew: סביון, lit. 'Eastern groundsel') is an affluent town in the Central District of Israel, bordering the cities of Kiryat Ono and Yehud. Ranked 10/10 on the Israeli socio-economic scale, it is one of the wealthiest municipalities in Israel. In 2024 it had a population of 4,405.

== History ==
During the 18th and 19th centuries, the area of Savyon belonged to the Nahiyeh (sub-district) of Lod that encompassed the area of the present-day city of Modi'in-Maccabim-Re'ut in the south to the present-day city of El'ad in the north, and from the foothills in the east, through the Lod Valley to the outskirts of Jaffa in the west. This area was home to thousands of inhabitants in about 20 villages, who had at their disposal tens of thousands of hectares of prime agricultural land.

Savyon was founded in 1955 by Africa Israel Investments for elderly South African Jewish immigrants. It was established on land that had formerly been the Palestinian town of Al-Abbasiyya. In 1948, David Ben-Gurion had requested the destruction of Al-'Abbasiyya, among other Palestinian villages whose inhabitants fled or were expelled. Between 1948 and 1954 the Israeli sites of Yehud, Magshimim, Ganne Yehuda, Ganne Tiqwa, and Savyon were established on the former land of Al-'Abbasiyya.

A number of South African Jews settled in Israel, forming a South African community in Savyon. Large houses were built in the style that the community was accustomed to from their life in South Africa. It took the Hebrew name of a common wildflower found in the Savyon region, the eastern groundsel. The shape of the wildflower was also used to model the territory of Savyon, thus causing their signature resemblance. Today, the flower is a signature of the town, being used in the logo of its governing council, Savyon Local Council.

In 2003 the moshav Ganei Yehuda was merged into Savyon.

== Voting Patterns ==
In the 2022 election, 73 percent of voters in Savyon voted for the parties of the center-left coalition led by Yair Lapid, while 24 percent voted for the parties of the right-wing coalition led by Benjamin Netanyahu and 0.6 percent voted for the Arab parties.

In the 2026 election, 76 percent of voters in Savyon voted for the parties of the center-left coalition led by Gadi Eisenkot, while 20 percent voted for the parties of the right-wing coalition led by Benjamin Netanyahu and 0.3 percent voted for the Arab parties. An additional 2.3 percent voted for the Reservists, and 1.3 percent voted for Amcha Yisrael. Voter turnout increased 13 percent from the 2022 election.

== Notable residents ==
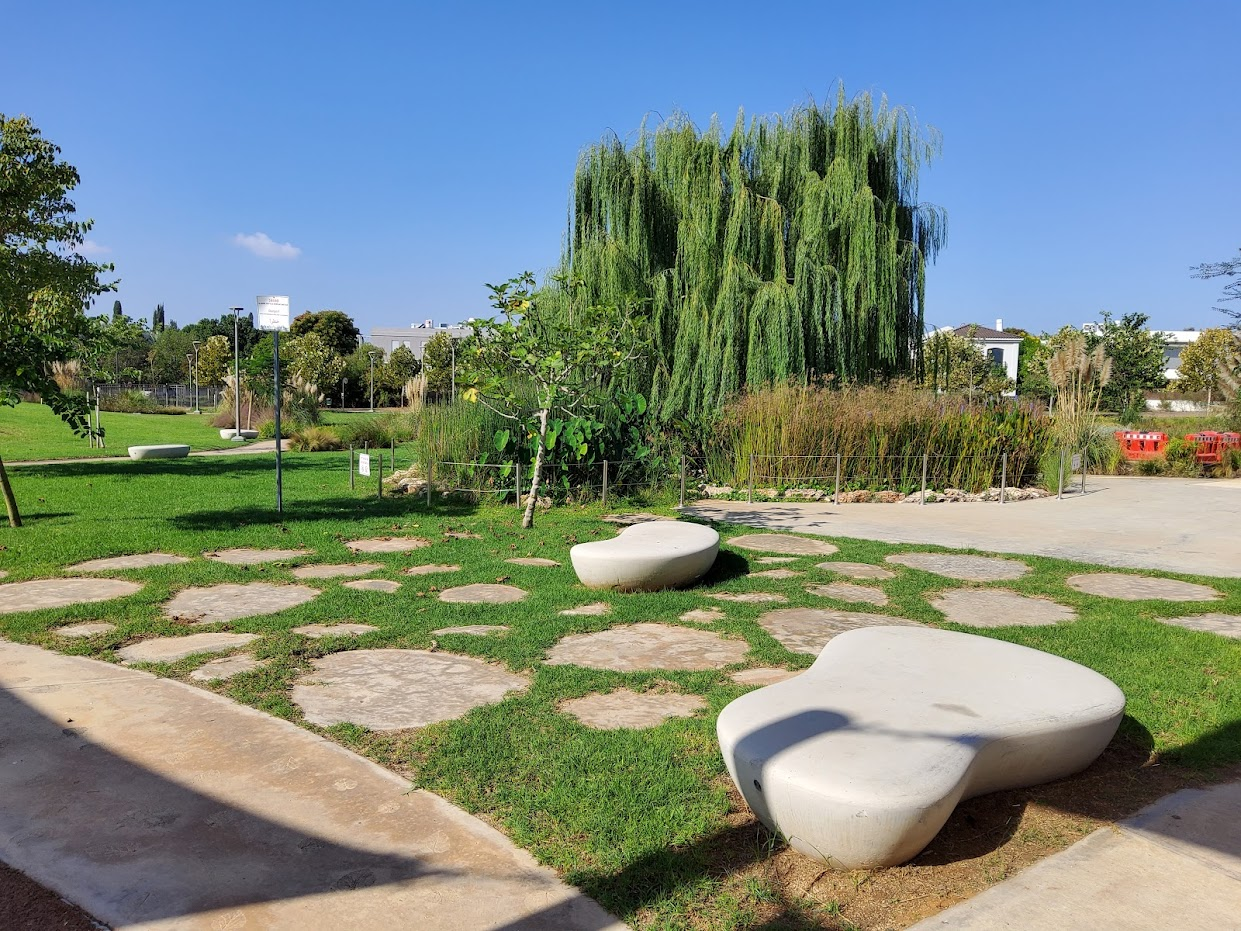
Bird Park in Savyon

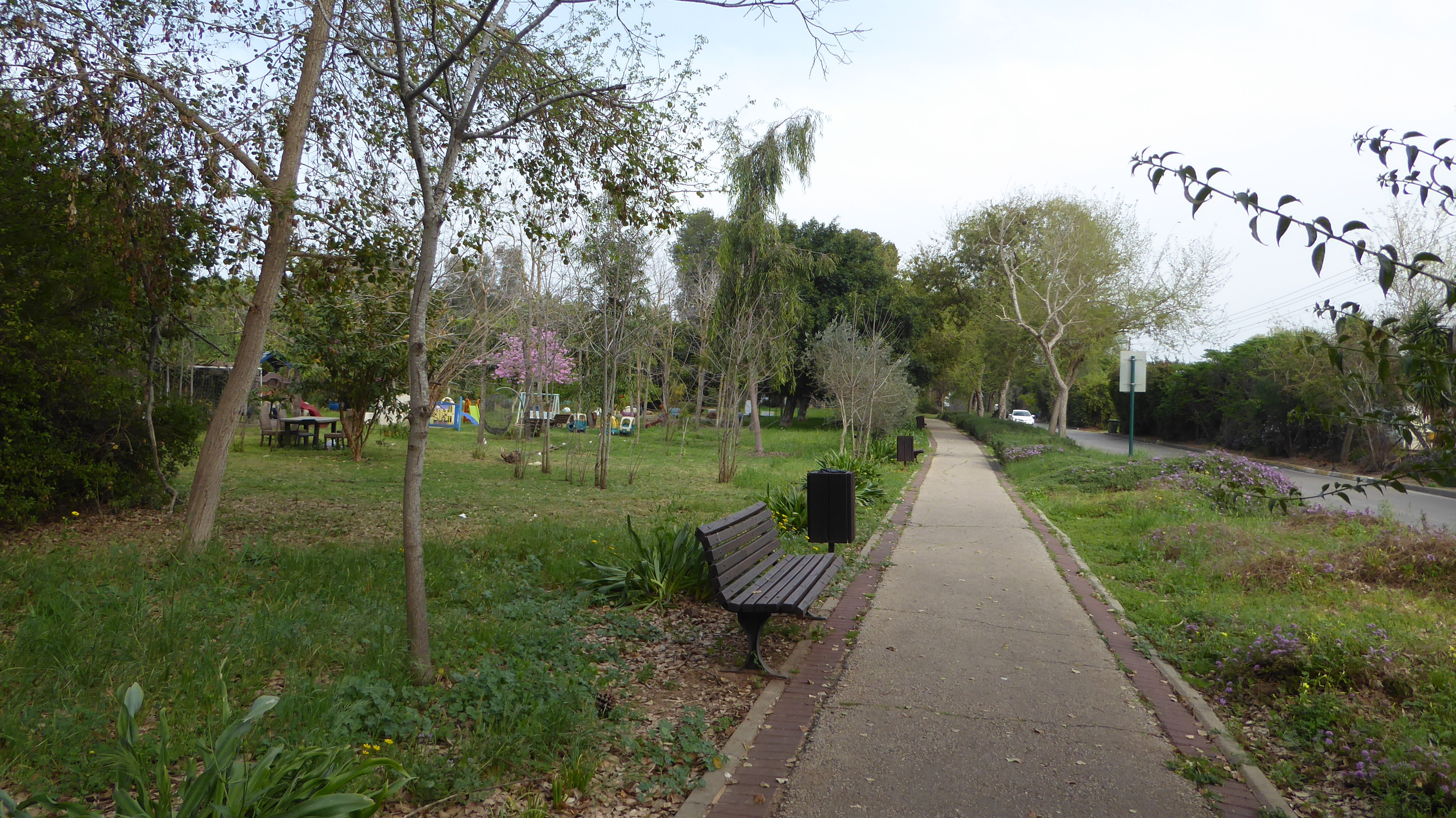
A garden in the area

- Moshe Arens - defense and foreign minister
- Aviv Bushinsky - businessman and journalist
- Arye Carmon - co-founder of the Israeli Democracy Institute
- Mikhail Chernoy - entrepreneur
- Haim Cohen - chef
- David D'Or - singer and composer
- Maya Dunietz - recording artist
- Shmuel Flatto-Sharon - businessman and politician
- Jean Frydman - businessman
- Dan Goldstein - founder of Formula Systems
- Dan Margalit - journalist and television host
- David Mor - businessman and politician
- Dan Naveh - politician
- Ofer Nimrodi - businessman and jurist
- Yaakov Nimrodi - businessman and intelligence officer
- Yair Nitzani - musician and comedian
- Gideon Patt - politician
- Al Schwimmer - engineer and businessman
- Yair Shamir - politician, businessman, and military officer
