= Yigal Cohen-Orgad =

Israeli politician (1937–2019)

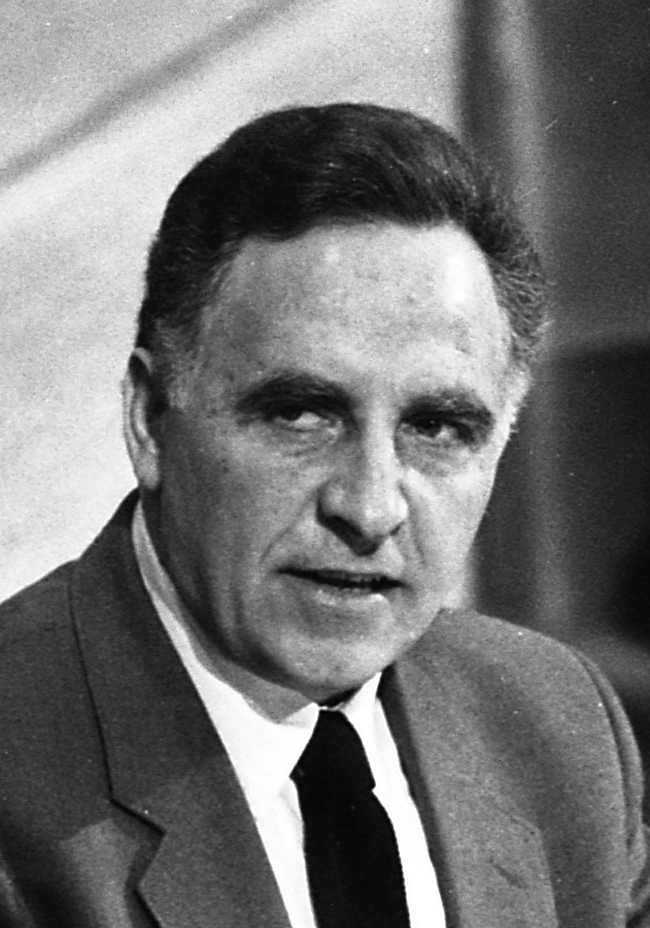
- Cohen-Orgad in 1984

Ministerial roles
- 1983–1984: Minister of Finance

Faction represented in the Knesset
- 1977–1988: Likud

Personal details
- Born: 30 August 1937 Tel Aviv, Mandatory Palestine
- Died: 27 August 2019 (aged 81) Tel Aviv, Israel

Yigal Cohen-Orgad (Hebrew: יגאל כהן-אורגד; 30 August 1937 – 27 August 2019) was an Israeli politician who served as Minister of Finance from October 1983 until September 1984. He was one of the founders of Ariel University, serving as its chancellor until his death.

== Biography ==
Born in Tel Aviv during the Mandate era, Cohen-Orgad studied economics and education at the Hebrew University of Jerusalem. During his youth, he was a member of the Bnei Etzel (Young Irgun) youth movement. In 1962 he started working in the Economic Planning Authority in the Ministry of Finance.

He joined Herut, but left and joined the Free Centre in 1965. He eventually returned to Herut, which by the mid-1970s had become part of the Likud alliance. He became chairman of Herut's economic council, and in 1977, was elected to the Knesset on the Likud list. He changed his name from Yigal Cohen to Yigal Cohen-Orgad to differentiate himself from Yigal Cohen, another Likud MK; "Orgad" was created from the initials of his four children. Re-elected in 1981, he was appointed Minister of Finance in October 1983, replacing Yoram Aridor. Although he retained his seat in the 1984 elections, he was not included in the new cabinet. He lost his Knesset seat in the 1988 elections.

Together with Moshe Arens, Cohen-Orgad was a driving force behind Israeli higher education in the occupied West Bank. Among the active founders of the College of Judea and Samaria, he became the major factor in its development into Ariel University, raising millions of dollars from private and public sources.

In 2013 he was presented with the Moskowitz Prize for Zionism.
