= Moskowitz Prize for Zionism =

Zionist activism award

- Awarded for: personal contribution to Zionism
- Country: Israel
- Presented by: Jewish National Fund
- First award: 2008; 18 years ago

Moskowitz Prize for Zionism, established by Irving and Cherna Moskowitz, is an award for activity that promotes Zionism. It has been granted every year since 2008 to three winners in a ceremony which takes place on Jerusalem Day, in the City of David. The prize extent to each winner is US$50,000.

The prize founder, billionaire Irving Moskowitz was an American businessman and a right-wing activist who supported Israeli settlements in the West Bank. His wife Cherna Moskowitz chairs the prize judge committee. The members of the committee are public personalities from Israel and abroad, whom amongst are Avigdor Kahalani and Moshe Arens. Yisrael Aumann serves as a special advisor of the prize committee.

Listed below are recipients of the main prize, known as the "Lion of Zion" award. Another award, called "Spirit of Zion", was given to several individuals between the years 2013-2016, "for new initiatives, [to] young Israelis with vision who recognize the need to stand up and be counted. "

== Winners ==
Year	Laureate	Notable Contribution / Affiliation
2008	Rabbi David Fendel	Head of the Hesder Yeshiva in Sderot
2008	Moshe Moshkowitz	Among the renovators of the Jewish settlement in Gush Etzion
2008	Ran Pekker	Fighter pilot and founder of the Tzahala Project for educating youth in good citizenship
2009	Noam Arnon	A leader of the Jewish community in Hebron
2009	Sammy Bar Lev	Early Golan Heights settler; founder of the city and Israeli settlement of Katzrin
2009	Ronit Shuker	A founder of the Shilo Group; owner of an olive press in the outpost of Achya
2010	Rabbi Yoel Schwartz	A founder of the Nahal Haredi Project and its spiritual authority
2010	Aharon Davidi	A founder of the Paratroopers Brigade; Main Infantry Corps and Paratroops Officer; co-founder of Sar El
2010	Anita Tucker	A leader of the Gush Katif settlement community
2011	Major General (res.) Meir Dagan	Former Director of the Mossad
2011	Rabbi Chanan Porat	A founder of the Gush Emunim movement
2011	Rabbi Yehoshua Fass	Co-founder and CEO of the Nefesh B'Nefesh organization
2012	Dr. Yitzhak Glick	Innovator in Israeli emergency medicine
2012	Nitsana Darshan-Leitner	Founder of Shurat HaDin (Israel Law Center)
2012	Zvi Slonim	A founder and leader of the Gush Emunim movement
2013	Yigal Cohen-Orgad	Chancellor of Ariel University and former Finance Minister
2013	Rabbi Moshe Levinger	A pioneering figure of Gush Emunim and the Jewish community in Hebron
2013	Dr. Zvi Zameret	Educator and prominent leader in Zionist education
2014	Michael Freund	Founder of Shavei Israel, an organization locating "lost tribes" of Israel
2014	Rabbi Yosef Zvi Rimon	Founder of JobKatif, providing employment resources post-disengagement
2014	Dr. Gabriel Barkay	Archaeologist specializing in the history of Jerusalem and the Temple Mount
2015	Yehuda Glick	Activist for human rights and religious freedom on Jerusalem’s Temple Mount
2015	Yisrael Harel	Journalist and a founder of the Yesha Council and settlement movement
2015	Yoel Zilberman	Founder of HaShomer HaChadash (The New Guardian), protecting agricultural lands in the Galilee and Negev
2016	Binyamin Elon	Politician, rabbi, and former Minister of Tourism
2016	Caroline Glick	Israeli-American author, columnist, and journalist
2016	Yehuda Harel	Former politician and member of the Knesset for The Third Way party
2017	Moshe Arens	Aeronautical engineer, diplomat, and former Likud defense minister
2019	Maor Farid	Researcher, social activist, and author
2019	Ruthi Antohon-Tortsky	Author and social activist focused on integration and community welfare
