= Yehoshua Fass =

American Israeli rabbi

- יהושע פס
- Born: 9 July 1973 (age 52); New York
- Education: B.A., Yeshiva University; M.A., Azrieli Graduate School of Jewish Education and Administration; Rabbinic ordination, Rabbi Isaac Elchanan Theological Seminary
- Occupations: Rabbi, co-founder of Nefesh B'Nefesh

Yehoshua Fass (Hebrew: יהושע פס; born July 9, 1973) is an American-Israeli rabbi and the co-founder and Executive Director of Nefesh B'Nefesh. The Jerusalem Post listed him among the fifty most influential Jews of 2017, and he is the recipient of the Moskowitz Prize for Zionism.

== Early life and education ==
Fass was born in New York. With his original plan to be at doctor, he completed a B.A. in biology and education at Yeshiva University when he was 20 years old. He was too young to enter medical school, so he took a year to teach in New York and New Jersey and discovered his passion for Jewish education. He earned an M.A. degree in education, and rabbinic ordination through the Rabbi Isaac Elchanan Theological Seminary at Yeshiva University.

== Career ==
Fass was a Judaic Studies Fellow of the Judaic Fellowship Program in Boca Raton, Florida. Eighteen months after starting the Fellowship Program, Fass was appointed assistant and then associate rabbi of the Boca Raton Synagogue. He sat on the Orthodox Rabbinical Council Beit Din, and opened and served as director of the Helen Julius Reiter Institute of Judaic Studies. He also worked as educational director of March of the Living.

=== Nefesh B'Nefesh ===
In March 2001, Fass's 13-year-old cousin Naftali Lanzkron was murdered in a terrorist bombing in Israel. According to Fass, this event spurred his family's decision to move to Israel. He and Florida businessman and philanthropist Tony Gelbart researched the reasons why North Americans interested in moving to Israel do not follow through with this decision. He had conversations with members of his community who expressed a desire to move to Israel but were too overwhelmed by the process. Those conversations and the challenges Fass encountered while coordinating his move compelled Fass to consider how the process could be streamlined. Together with Gelbart, he co-founded Nefesh B'Nefesh, an organization that facilitates the immigration of North American Jews to Israel.

== Awards and recognition ==
- 2000 — Fass received the Rabbinic Leadership Award from the United Jewish Communities in Chicago, "For his outreach educational work".
- 2011— Fass received the Moskowitz Prize for Zionism, for his role as "co-founder of the Nefesh B'Nefesh English speakers' aliyah movement".
- 2013 — Yeshiva University awarded Fass and his partner Gelbart honorary doctorates.
- 2017 — Fass was listed among the 50 influential Jews by The Jerusalem Post which reported as a "co-founder of the Nefesh B'Nefesh English speakers' aliyah movement" that "Fass is a key player in the lives of Jewish people."
- 2024 - Fass was honored at Hadassah-Israel's Special Gifts Event, presented with the "Builder of Israel" Award.

== Personal life ==
In 2002, Fass immigrated to Israel with the first Nefesh B'Nefesh charter flight.

Fass lives in Beit Shemesh with his wife and seven children.
