= South African Jews in Israel =

Ethnic subgroup

Total population
- 11,381 (2020)

Regions with significant populations
- Savyon, Ra'anana, Jerusalem, Tel Aviv

Languages
- Hebrew, South African English

Religion
- Judaism

South African Jews in Israel are immigrants and descendants of the immigrants of the South African Jewish communities, who now reside within the State of Israel. In 2020, 11,381 South Africans were recorded as living in Israel.

== History ==
A number of South African Jews settled in Israel, forming a South African community in Israel. Perhaps the most famous South African community founded in Israel is Savyon, which remains the wealthiest suburb in Israel. Large houses were built in the style that the community was accustomed to from their life in South Africa, each with a pool, and developed around a country club.

== Notable people ==
- Abba Eban
- Danny Amos
- Adi Bielski
- Leo Camron
- Maxine Fassberg, CEO Intel Israel
- Mervyn Gotsman
- David Schneider (tennis)
- Benjamin Pogrund
- Morris Kahn

== See also ==
- Israel–South Africa relations
- History of the Jews in South Africa
- Lemba people
