= Ofer Nimrodi =

Israeli jurist, businessman and publisher

- עופר נמרודי
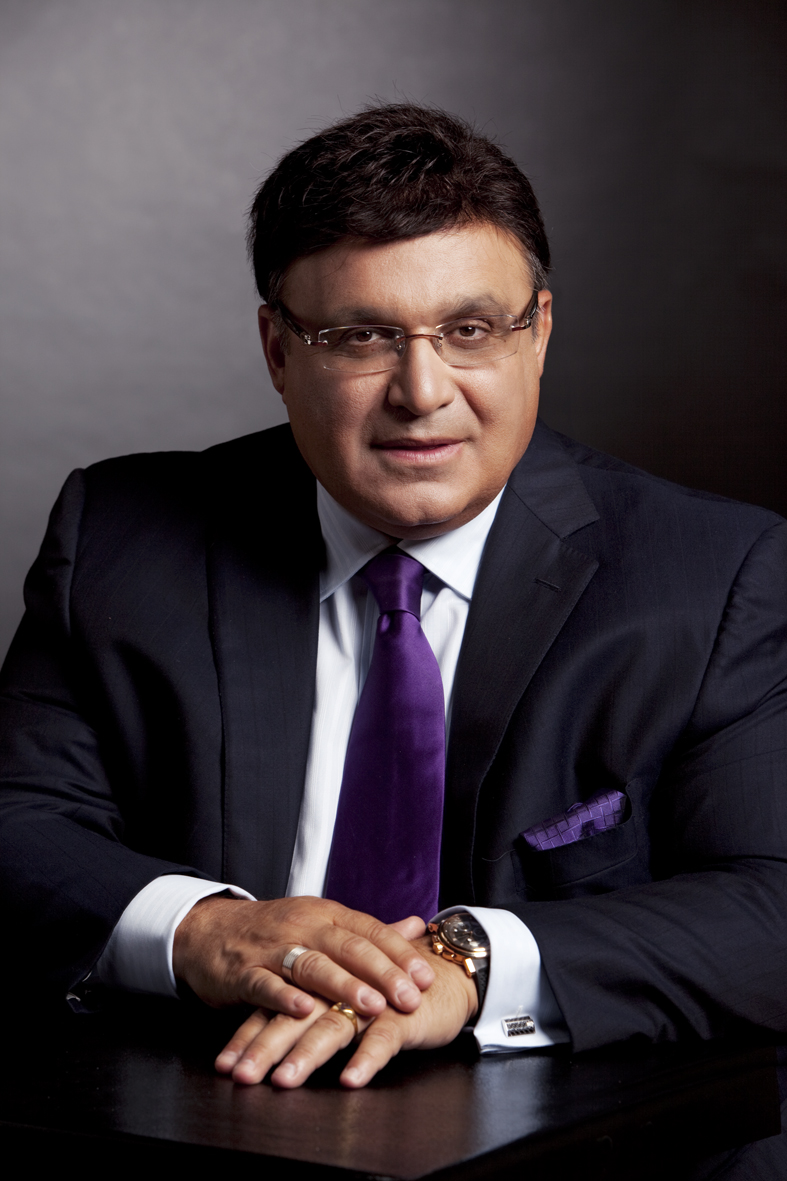
- Ofer Nimrodi
- Born: May 23, 1957 (age 69); Iran
- Education: LLB, Tel Aviv University; MBA, Harvard Business School
- Occupation: Businessman
- Known for: CEO of Israel Land Development Company, former publisher of Ma'ariv
- Children: 6
- Criminal information
- Convictions: Illegal wiretapping; Obstruction of justice
- Penalty: 8 months in prison for wiretapping (1998-1999); 25 months in prison for obstruction of justice (2000-2002)

Ofer Nimrodi (Hebrew: עופר נמרודי; born May 23, 1957) is an Israeli jurist, businessman and former publisher.

== Biography ==
Ofer Nimrodi, whose family was of Iraqi-Jewish origin, was born to Rivka and Yaakov Nimrodi in Iran in 1957 while his father served as the Israeli Military Attaché and Head of the Representation of the Ministry of Defense to Iran. On completion of his mandate, the family stayed for several more years in Iran as Yaakov Nimrodi became a businessman. Later on they returned to Israel, settling in Savyon.

In the IDF, Nimrodi served as an artillery battery Commander in the Artillery Corps, and later as Commander of Brigade Support. He was discharged in 1979 and three years later fought in the First Lebanon War. He graduated cum laude from the Tel Aviv University Law School with an LLB, did his articles with the late Supreme Court Judge Miriam Ben-Porat (later the State Comptroller), and with the late Tel Aviv District Attorney Naomi Stern, and was admitted to the Israeli Bar. In 1989, he graduated from Harvard Business School (HBS) with a Master of Business Administration.

== Private life ==
Nimrodi, married for the second time, has six children. He lives in Savyon in a mansion on a property of 7.5 acres.

Nimrodi's sister, Ruth Nimrodi-Weissberg, was killed in the Sinai in 1996 when the vehicle she was traveling in drove over an old Egyptian mine in an unmarked minefield. The Variety Israel center in Jerusalem, an organization for children with special needs, is named after her.

== Business career ==
In 1988, Yaakov Nimrodi purchased the Israel Land Development Company from the Jewish Agency. A year later, Ofer was appointed its CEO.

Israel Land Development Co. is a real estate company, established in 1909. In the late 1980s, businessman Yaakov Nimrodi acquired the company, and his son, Ofer Nimrodi, has served as CEO for many years. The Nimrodi family holds a 54% stake in the company. The Israel Land Development Co. has grown through its investments and activities in Poland, such as its 2022 investment of €1.5 million in subsidiary MLP Group, which then operated a single logistics center, on the outskirts of Warsaw. Presently, MLP boasts 20 parks across Poland, Austria, Germany, and Romania, with a market cap of €330 million, being publicly traded on the Polish Stock Exchange. The Israel Land Development Co.'s 41% ownership stake is currently valued at €140 million.

In 1992, the family purchased the Ma'ariv newspaper, after the passing of its previous owner Robert Maxwell. Ofer was appointed Publisher and Editor-in-Chief. Nimrodi's entering the media field, and Maariv particularly, was considered outstanding since neither Nimrodi, nor any of the family members had ever been engaged in the field of journalism or any other media. The engagement of "tycoons" in the media world drew much criticism and hostility from the veteran "media dynasties" in Israel (Mozes of Yedioth Ahronoth and Shocken of Haaretz) and led to fierce competition. This competition also brought the leading publishers to purchase other media such as cable TV channels, until a law passed that banned cross-ownership in the media field.

In June 2011, The Israel Land Development Company sold the controlling shareholding of Ma'ariv to Discount Investment Corporation, a member of the IDB Group, controlled by Nochi Dankner. ILDC continues to hold a 27% stake in Ma'ariv.

Nimrodi has greatly expanded ILDC's business abroad. The company engaged in the development of large residential real estate projects by building neighborhoods in Warsaw and Bucharest, commercial real estate through logistic parks in Poland and Romania, shopping malls in Romania, Moldova, and Morocco, and in hotels and resorts in Canada and Morocco.

In 2010, the company entered another new field with the establishment of the Israel Land Development Company - Energy Ltd. The company purchased licenses and options for licenses for locating gas and oil in the Levant Basin of the Mediterranean (in Israel’s economic waters) and in the Adriatic Sea. The company began drilling in two of its leading licenses: Sara and Myra.

== Criminal convictions ==
Nimrodi served an 8-month prison sentence during 1998-1999 for ordering illegal wiretapping while serving as the editor-in-chief of Ma'ariv. In 2000, he received a 25-month prison sentence for obstruction of justice, which was served concurrently with an originally suspended 12-month sentence handed for his 1998 conviction. The decision not to add the 12 months to his prison-time was criticized by the state prosecutor's office upon his release in 2002, expressing concerns that Nimrodi had recidivist tendencies.
