= Maor Farid =

Israeli researcher and social activist

- מאור פריד
- Born: April 20, 1992 (age 34); Ness Ziona, Israel
- Education: Technion; Massachusetts Institute of Technology; Harvard Kennedy School
- Awards: Forbes 30 Under 30; Moskowitz Prize for Zionism
- Scientific career
- Fields: Applied Mathematics; Artificial Intelligence; Nonlinear Dynamics; Chaos Theory
- Workplaces: Massachusetts Institute of Technology
- Doctoral advisor: Oleg Gendelman
- Website: maorfarid.com

Maor Farid (Hebrew: מאור פריד; born April 20, 1992) is an Israeli scientist, engineer and artificial intelligence researcher at Massachusetts Institute of Technology, social activist, and author. He is the founder and CEO of Learn to Succeed (Hebrew: ללמוד להצליח) for empowering of youths from the Israeli socio-economic periphery and youths at risk, a regional manager of the Israeli center of ScienceAbroad at MIT, and an activist in the American Technion Society. He is an alumnus of Unit 8200, and a fellow of Fulbright Program and the Israel Scholarship Educational Foundation. Dr. Farid was elected to the Forbes 30 Under 30 list of 2019, and won the Moskowitz Prize for Zionism.

== Early life ==
Maor was born in Ness Ziona, a city in central Israel, as the eldest son for parents from immigrating families of Mizrahi Jews from Iraq and Libya. Maor suffered from Attention deficit hyperactivity disorder (ADHD) from a young age, and was classified as a problematic and violent student. His ADHD issues were diagnosed only after he began his university studies. However, inspired by his parents' background, he aspired to excel at school for a better future for his family. During elementary school, Maor attended local quizzes about Jewish history and Zionism, which significantly shaped his identity and national perspective. Farid graduated high school with the highest GPA in school. Later he was recruited to the Israel Defense Forces and drafted to the Brakim Program – an excellence program of the Israeli Intelligence Corps for training leading R&D officers for the Israeli military and defense industry. Maor graduated the program with honors and was elected by the Israeli Prime Minister's Office and Unit 8200, where he served as an artificial intelligence researcher, officer, and commander. During his Military service, he received various honors and awards, such as the Excellent Scientist Award, given to the top three academics serving in the Israel Defense Forces. In 2019, Farid completed his military service in the rank of a Captain.

== Education and academic career ==
As part of the (4 years) Brakim Program, Maor completed his Bachelor's and Master's degrees at the Technion in Mechanical Engineering with honors. Then, he initiated his Ph.D. research as a collaboration with the Israel Atomic Energy Commission (IAEC) in parallel to his duty military service. The main goals of his Ph.D. research were predicting irreversible effects of major earthquakes on Israel's nuclear facilities, and improving their seismic resistance using energy absorption technologies. The mathematical models developed by Farid were able to forecast earthquake effects on facilities with major hazard potential, and predicted the failure of liquid storage tanks due to earthquakes took place in Italy (2012) and Mexico (2017). The energy absorption technologies used, increased in up to 90% the seismic resistance abilities of those sensitive facilities. The research results were published in multiple papers in peer-reviewed academic journals and presented in international academic conferences. Later, this research expanded to an official collaboration between the Technion and the Shimon Peres Negev Nuclear Research Center, which aims to implement the findings obtained on existing sensitive systems, and won funding of 1.5 million NIS from the Pazy foundation of the Israel Atomic Energy Commission and the Council for Higher Education.

In 2017, Farid completed his Ph.D. and as the youngest graduate at the Technion for that year, at the age of 24. In the graduation ceremonies, he honored his parents to receive the diplomas on his behalf. At the same year, he served as a lecturer at Ben-Gurion University in an original course he developed as a solution for knowledge gaps he identified in the Israeli defense industry.

In 2018, Dr. Farid served as an artificial intelligence researcher at a Data Science team of Unit 8200, where he developed machine learning-based solutions for military and operational needs.

In 2019, Farid won the Fulbright and the Israel Scholarship Educational Foundation scholarships, and was accepted to post-doctoral position at Massachusetts Institute of Technology where he develops real-time methods for predicting earthquake effects using machine learning techniques.

In 2020, Farid was accepted to the Emerging Leaders Program at Harvard Kennedy School in Cambridge, Massachusetts. At the same year, he received the excellence research grant of the Israel Academy of Sciences and Humanities for leading his research in collaboration between MIT and the Technion.

== Social activism ==
Farid social activism focuses on empowering youths from disadvantaged backgrounds from an early age. In 2010–2015, he served as a mentor of a robotics team from Dimona in FIRST Robotics Competition, a mathematics tutor in "Aharai!" program for high-school students at risk in Dimona and Be'er Sheva, and a mentor and private tutor of adolescence and reserve duty soldiers from disadvantaged backgrounds. In 2010, he initiated "Learn to Succeed" (Hebrew: ללמוד להצליח) project, for mitigating the social gaps in the Israeli society by empowering youths from the social, economical, and geographical periphery for excellence, self-fulfillment and gaining formal education.

In 2018, Learn to Succeed became an official non-profit organization. At the same year, Farid led a crowdfunding project of 150,000 NIS in order to expand the organization to a national scale.

In 2019, he published the book "Learn to Succeed", in which he describes his struggle with ADHD, the violent environment in which he grew up, and the changing process he went through from being a violent teenager to becoming the youngest Ph.D. graduate at the Technion. The book was given to more than two thousand youths at risk and became a top seller in Israel shortly after its publication. Maor dedicated the book to his parents and to the memorial of his friend Captain Tal Nachman who was killed in operational activity during his military service in 2014.

The organization consists of hundreds of volunteers, gives full scholarships to STEM students from the periphery who serve as mentors of youths, both Jews and Arabs, from disadvantaged backgrounds, runs a hotline which gives online practical and mental support to hundreds of youths, parents and educators, initiates inspirational activities with military orientation to increase the motivation of its teen-age members for significant military service, and gives inspirational lectures to more than 5,000 youths each year.

In 2019, Maor initiated a collaboration with Unit 8200 in which tens of the program's members are being interviewed to the unit. This opportunity is usually given to students with the highest grades in the matriculate exams in each class.

In 2020, Dr. Farid established the ScienceAbroad center at MIT, aiming to strengthen the connections between Israeli researchers in the institute and the state of Israel. Moreover, he serves as a volunteer in the American Technion Society.

== Honors and awards ==
- Fulbright Scholarship for post-doctoral studies. Given by the US State Department for distinguished scientific excellence and leadership skills (among 8 winners from all disciplines) (2019).
- Israel Scholarship Education Foundation (ISEF) postdoctoral fellowship for academic and personal excellence (among two winners from all disciplines) (2019).
- Moskowitz Prize for Zionism, leadership and social entrepreneurship for the establishment of Learn to Succeed association for empowering of youth at risk from the social, economical and geographical periphery, and mitigating social gaps in the Israeli society (among 2 winners) (2019).
- Elected on the 30 Under 30 list of Forbes magazine. The list members are considered as game-changers in their field, and expected to be key figures in the future (among 30 winners from all disciplines) (2019).
- Elected as Brakim Excellent Officer, received the Excellent Commander Award of Unit 8200, and other military honors, for excellence, leadership and distinguished contribution (2019).
- B.Sc., M.Sc. and Ph.D. graduation at the Technion with honors (2010–2017).

== Personal life ==
Farid is married to Michal.

== Interviews and articles ==
- Ilan Leserovich, "The sons of the poor ones", Israel Hayom national daily newspaper, 2018.
- Avr Gilad and Tali Metz, "Without proper assistance, youths from the periphery have no chance to succeed", TV interview at Ha'Olam Ha'Boker morning show, 2018.
- Yael Dan, "They don't need your mercy, but only your guidance" radio interview at Galei Tzahal (Army Radio), 2018.
- Nadav Abekasis, "From a violent youth to the establishment of Learn to Succeed" at Tel-Aviv Radio, 2018.
- Ofer Noiman, "Giving youths at risk essential tools for success" radio interview at Tel-Aviv Radio, 2019.
- Yakov Sitruk Dahan, "Learning critical financial skills" at Sheva Journal, 2019.
- "Empowering the periphery in the Zionism of the 21st century", YouTube video, the Moskowitz Prize for Zionism 2019.
- "I wish you to change the world" YouTube video Speech on behalf of the Forbes 30 Under 30 list of 2019.
- Hadas Bashan, Forbes 30 Under 30 – Maor Farid, Forbes magazine, 2019.
- Hadas Bashan, "The economic periphery has a tremendous advantage in the world of research", Forbes magazine, 2019.
- Fulbright Program, "Meet a Fulbrighter", an interview for Fulbright magazine, 2019.
