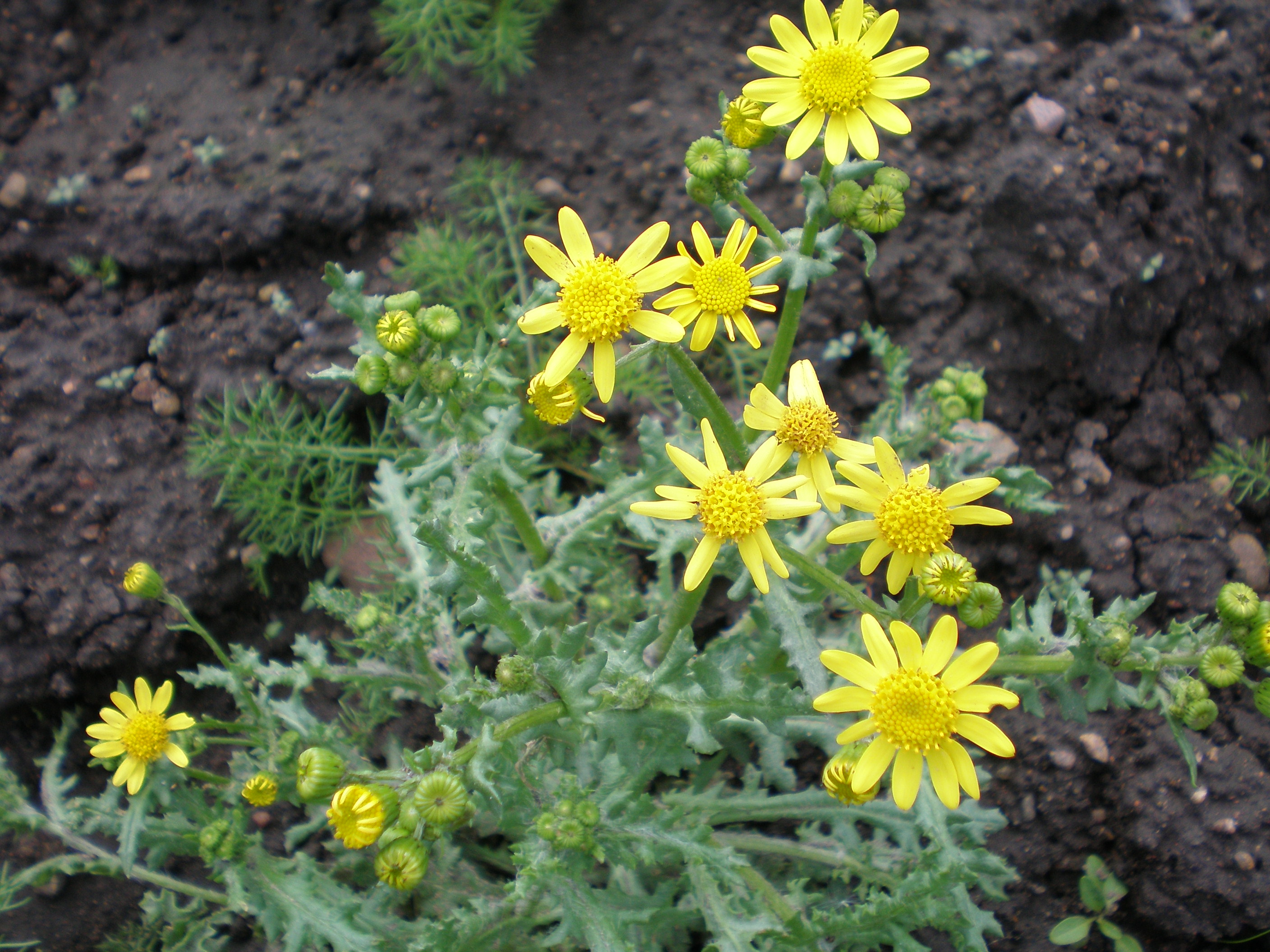
- Eastern groundsel

Scientific classification
- Kingdom: Plantae
- Clade: Tracheophytes
- Clade: Angiosperms
- Clade: Eudicots
- Clade: Asterids
- Order: Asterales
- Family: Asteraceae
- Genus: Senecio
- Species: S. vernalis

Binomial name
- Senecio vernalis Waldst. & Kit.

Synonyms
- Senecio euxinus Minderova; Senecio polycephalus Ledeb. Senecio leucanthemifolius Poir.

= Senecio vernalis =

Species of flowering plant

Senecio vernalis is one of the European species of Senecio, an annual that is also known as eastern groundsel. While it has been long classified as Senecio vernalis, this species has more recently been described as a subspecies of Senecio leucanthemifolius and is now included by some in that species.

== Description ==
Eastern groundsel is a "lovely yellow-flowering weed found by the roadside and on the edges of fields" that can be sometimes confused with S. eboracensis.

Stems and leaves
Leaves usually wavey, dissected, with lateral lobes that are about as long as width of central undivided portion, usually conspicuously covered with fine hairs. The edges are serrated. Leaves alternate one leaf per node along the stem.

Seeds
The oldest collection of seeds recorded was 16 years; average germination change for these was from 100% to 82.5%, with a mean storage period 13 years.

A Senecio and a diploid, Senecio vernalis is part of a species group along with S. flavus, S. gallicus, S. squalidus and S. glaucus who are widespread geographically and interesting for the study of genecology (the study of genetic differences in relation to the environment) and plant evolution.

== Common names ==
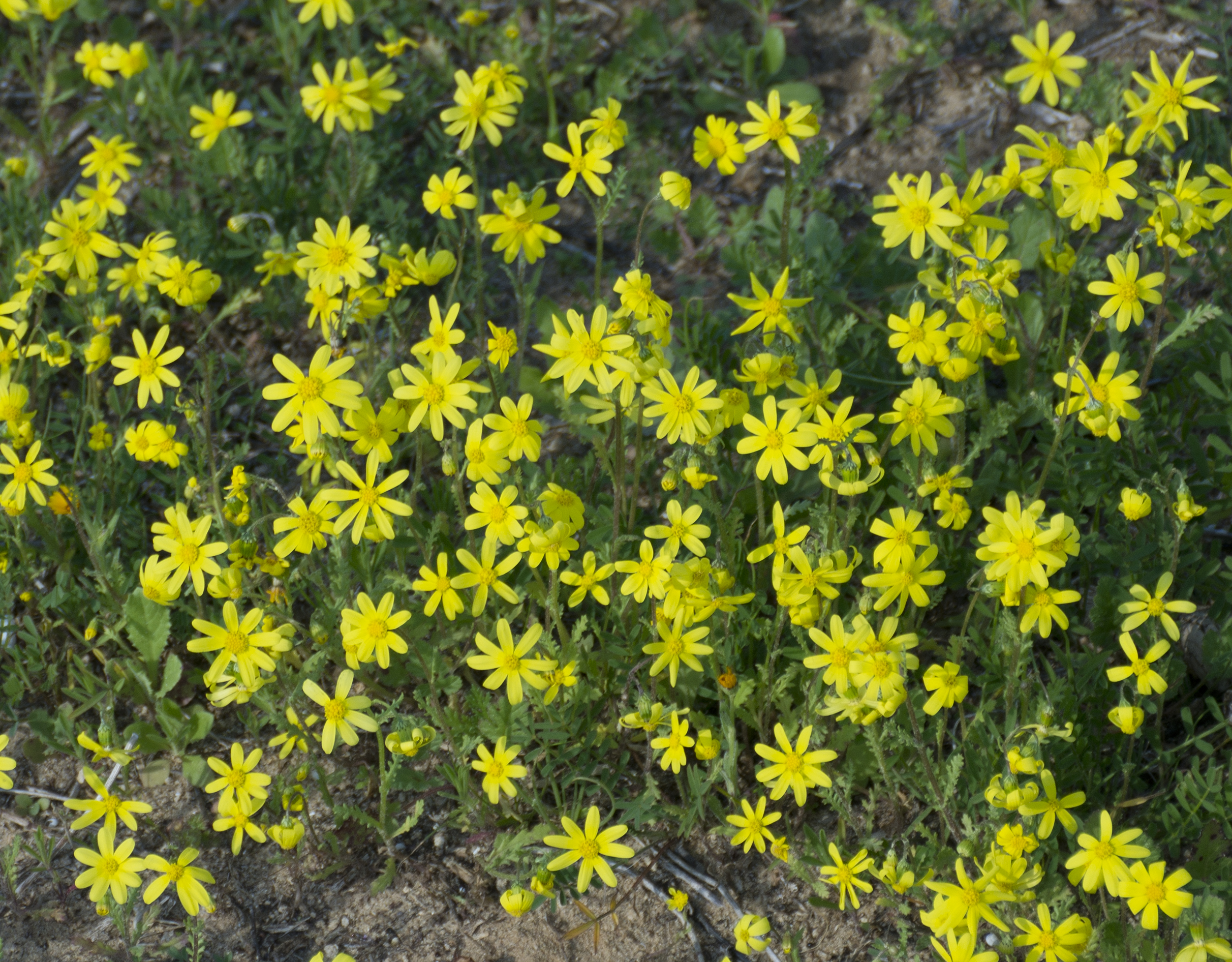
Eastern Groundsel (Senecio vernalis) in Israel.

- English: eastern groundsel
- German: Frühlings-Greiskraut
- Estonian: Kevad-ristirohi
- Finnish: Kevätvillakko
- Dutch: Oostelijk kruiskruid
- Latvian: Pavasara krustaine
- Lithuanian: Pavasarinė žilė
- Hungarian: Tavaszi aggófű
- Croatian: Proljetni dragušac, Proljetni kostriš, Proljetni staračac
- French: Séneçon de printemps
- Slovene: Starček jarný
- Danish: Vår-Brandbæger
- Swedish: Vårkorsört
- Norwegian: Vårsvineblom
- Romanian: spălăcioasă
- Russian: Крестовник весенний
- Armenian: Հալևորուկ գարնանային
- Hebrew: סביון אביבי ,סַבְיוֹן אֲבִיבִי

== Distribution ==
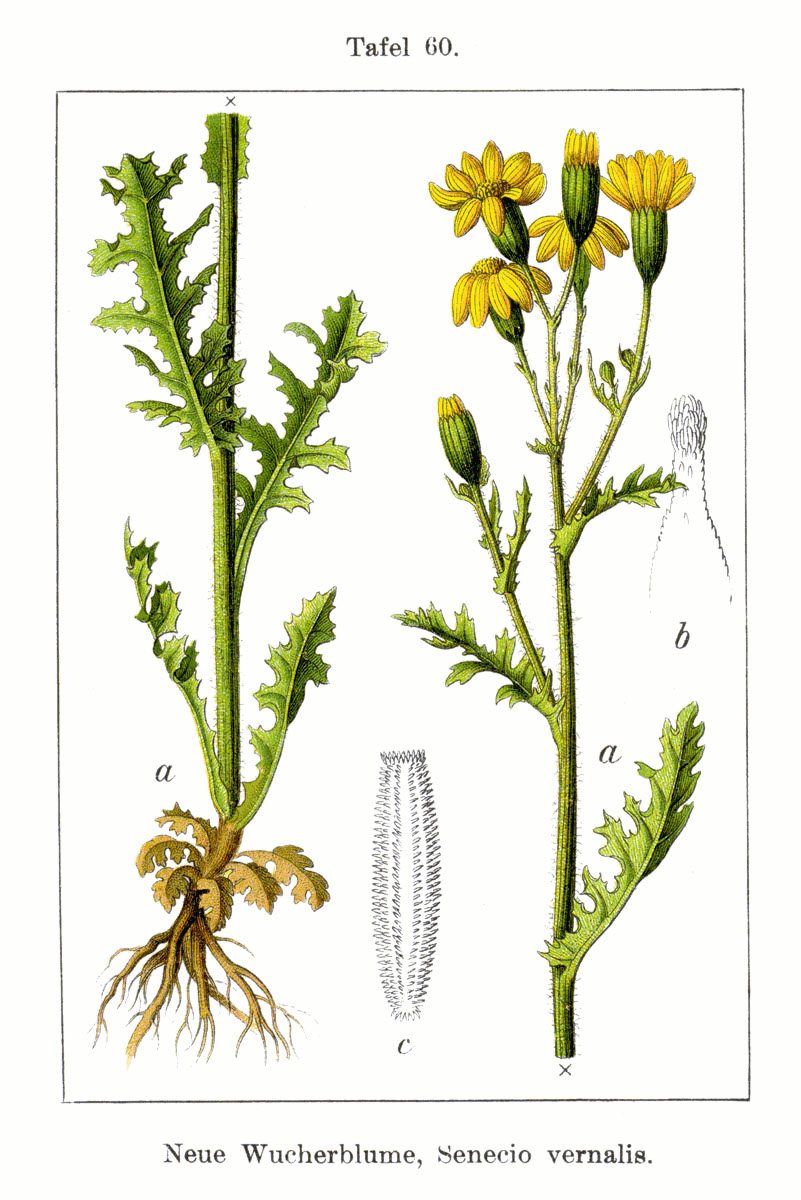
Illustration of S. vernalis

Native:

Palearctic:

Western Asia: Cyprus, Iran, Iraq, Israel, Jordan, Lebanon, Syria, Turkey
Caucasus: Armenia, Azerbaijan, Georgia, Ciscaucasia, Dagestan
Middle Asia: Turkmenistan
Middle Europe: Austria, Hungary, Poland
East Europe: Belarus, Croatia, Estonia, Crimea, Latvia, Lithuania, Ukraine
Southeastern Europe: Albania, Bulgaria, Greece, Romania, Slovenia, Bosnia and Herzegovina, Montenegro, Serbia, Macedonia. Kosovo

== Subspecies or varieties which are also synonyms ==
- Senecio leucanthemifolius subsp. vernalis (Waldst. & Kit.) Greuter

Misapplied names
- Senecio coronopifolius sec. Grossgejm, A. A.
- Senecio gallicus sec. Demiri, M.
- Senecio gallicus sec. Josifović, M. & al.
- Senecio gallicus sec. Hayek, A. von
