= Nefesh B'Nefesh =

Nonprofit organization

- נפש בנפש
- Abbreviation: NBN
- Formation: August 2001; 25 years ago
- Founders: Tony Gelbart; Rabbi Yehoshua Fass
- Type: Nonprofit
- Tax ID no.: 580544120
- Purpose: Aliyah (Jewish immigration to Israel)
- Headquarters: Yitzchak Rabin 10, Jerusalem, Israel
- Services: Employment, logistical and financial assistance, networking, social guidance
- Chairman: Tony Gelbart
- Executive director: Rabbi Yehoshua Fass
- Vice-chairman: Erez Halfon
- Revenue: US$16,203,170 (2022)
- Expenses: US$16,796,874 (2022)
- Website: www.nbn.org.il

Nefesh B'Nefesh (Hebrew: נפש בנפש, lit. 'Soul to soul'), or Jewish Souls United, is a nonprofit organization that promotes, encourages, and facilitates aliyah (Jewish immigration to Israel) from the United States and Canada.

The organization aims to remove or minimize the financial, professional, logistical, and social obstacles that potential olim (Jewish immigrants) face. Nefesh B'Nefesh works in close cooperation with the Jewish Agency for Israel, the Government of Israel and major Jewish organizations across various denominations, and assists people of all ages in the pre- and post-aliyah process, offering resources such as employment guidance and networking, assistance navigating the Israeli system, social guidance and counseling.

Since 2002, Nefesh B'Nefesh has brought over 100,000 olim to Israel. In 2011 Nefesh B'Nefesh co-founder Rabbi Yehoshua Fass received the Moskowitz Prize for Zionism on behalf of the organization.

== History ==
Nefesh B'Nefesh was originally conceived by Rabbi Yehoshua Fass after a family member was killed in a terrorist attack in Israel on 28 March 2001. Realizing that there were many people who wanted to immigrate to Israel but were concerned about certain obstacles, Rabbi Fass and Florida businessman and philanthropist Tony Gelbart decided to create an organization which would try to make it easier for American Jews to make aliyah.

In the summer of 2002, Nefesh B'Nefesh organized its first chartered aliyah flight. In November 2005, Prime Minister Ariel Sharon authorized government funding for Nefesh B'Nefesh on a trial basis. In May 2006, in response to numerous requests from British Jews interested in aliyah, services were expanded to also include the UK. In December 2006, Nefesh B'Nefesh brought its 10,000th oleh.

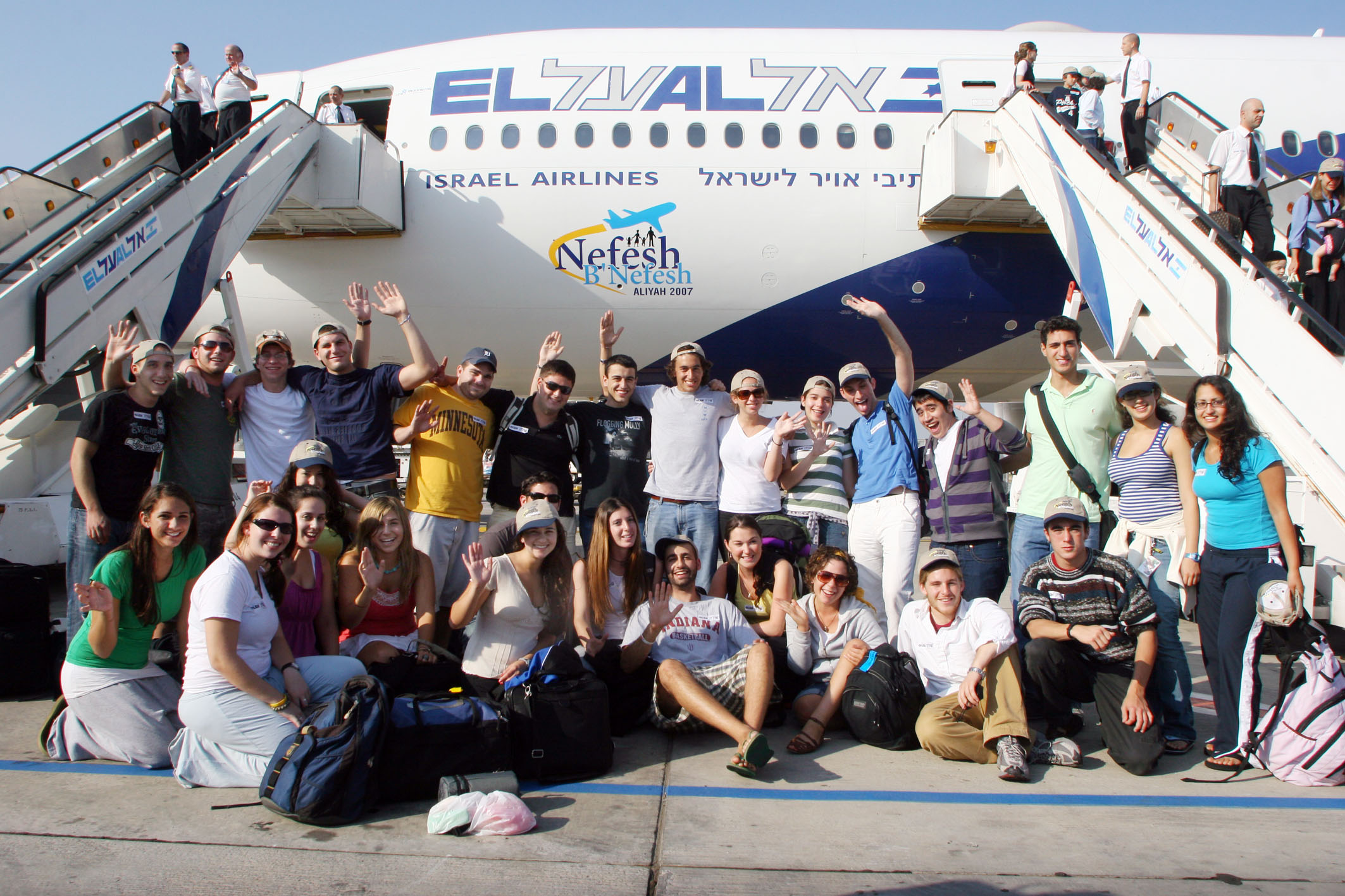
Nefesh B'Nefesh charter flight, 2007

In January 2008, Nefesh B'Nefesh, in conjunction with Legacy Heritage Fund, announced provision of significant fellowship grants for physicians making aliyah in order to help counteract a projected shortage of physicians in Israel. In March 2008, with the help of Nefesh B'Nefesh, a Knesset "Lobby for the Encouragement for Aliya from the West" was established. The lobby aims to raise awareness of the unique needs of Western olim and further remove obstacles that they may face during the initial stages of their acclimation.

In August 2008, the Jewish Agency for Israel and Nefesh B'Nefesh created a "one-stop shop" designed to streamline the aliyah process and make it easier for olim. Under the new "collaborative venture" Nefesh B'Nefesh is the primary source responsible for marketing and promoting the concept of aliyah to Jews in North America. The Jewish Agency is responsible for the aliyah eligibility process with the appropriate authorities in Israel. In September 2008, the Israeli government officially recognized Nefesh B'Nefesh in a decision designed to enhance aliyah from Western countries.

In December 2008, Nefesh B'Nefesh, in cooperation with the Israeli government and the Jewish Agency, and with the support of the Russell Berrie Foundation, launched the "Go North" initiative. The initiative presents prospective immigrants with an unprecedented benefits package to help new olim move to Northern Israel.

In 2009, oil tycoon Guma Aguiar donated $8 million to the organization. In September 2009, Erez Halfon became Vice Chairman of Nefesh B'Nefesh. Prior to joining the organization, he served as Director General of the Ministry of Immigrant Absorption from 2006 to 2008.

In February 2010, the Office of the Prime Minister, Ministry of Immigrant Absorption and Ministry for the Development of the Negev and Galilee agreed to intensify their partnerships with Nefesh B'Nefesh. In September 2013, Nefesh B'Nefesh's Bonei Zion Prize was established, "in order to formally recognize the achievements of outstanding Anglo olim and their contribution to the State of Israel." A prize is awarded in each of the following categories: Community & non-profit, education, Israel advocacy, science & medicine, young leadership, and culture, art & sports.

In November 2021, Nefesh B’Nefesh opened its new Aliyah campus opposite the Supreme Court in Jerusalem. As of August 2026, Nefesh B'Nefesh has facilitated the aliyah process for 100,000 people.

== Funding ==
In 2021, Nefesh B'Nefesh received more than 10 million shekels in grants from the Israeli Ministry of Aliyah and Integration.

== Services ==
Nefesh B'Nefesh provides assistance with Israeli bureaucratic procedures and helps olim overcome cultural gaps. The Government Advocacy Department works with governmental and institutional bodies, such as the Ministries of Interior and Immigrant Absorption. The department provides information for olim, such as guides for dealing with government offices and agencies, and information regarding benefits.

Nefesh B'Nefesh provides chartered and group aliyah flights with El Al Airlines, Israel's official airline.

In January 2008, Nefesh B'Nefesh, in conjunction with the Legacy Heritage Fund, offered fellowship grants to physicians making Aliyah. NBN also began working directly with the Israeli Ministry of Health to enable medical professionals to convert and receive their licenses efficiently.

=== MedEx / IMAP ===
In 2019, the organization launched a 'MedEx' track for prospective immigrants to help smooth the process for medical professionals who were moving to Israel. An annual “MedEx” event is held in the United States, at which medical professionals, who are in the process of making Aliyah, can meet representatives from the Israeli Ministry of Health licensing division, the Israel Medical Association (IMA), Israel's National Health Funds (Kupot Holim), and Israeli hospitals. As of 2023, more than 3800 medical professionals from various specialties have made Aliyah through Nefesh B'Nefesh. In 2024, the MedEx program was expanded globally, and renamed as International Medical Aliyah Program (IMAP), in a joint initiative with Israel's Ministry of Aliyah and Integration and Ministry of Health, as part of Israel's efforts to address the doctor shortage in the country.

=== Go Beyond ===
In December 2008, NBN, the Israeli government, and the Jewish Agency, with support from the Russell Berrie Foundation created the Go North program, offering incentives to prospective immigrants to move to northern Israel. In 2013, Nefesh B'Nefesh, KKL and JNF-USA created a comparable program entitled "Go South," incentivizing olim moving to southern Israel. In 2017, the programs were combined as Go Beyond.

=== Employment ===
In 2021, Nefesh B'Nefesh created UpGrade, an employment program offering career training courses for olim.

=== Lone Soldiers and National Service Volunteers ===
In cooperation with the Friends of the Israeli Defense Forces (FIDF), Nefesh B’Nefesh established the Lone Soldiers Program to assist immigrants serving in the IDF, regardless of their country of origin. The program supports approximately 3500 lone soldier olim, serving in a range of positions in the IDF, annually. The Ori program assists Lone National Service Volunteer olim with their needs during their year of service. In its first year, 2019, Ori helped 150 girls from all over the world, who completed their national service in medical institutions, educational facilities, and government organizations.

== Criticism ==
In late 2012, the Haaretz newspaper published an investigation that made claims against Nefesh B'Nefesh alleging that the organization has not significantly increased aliyah since its founding, that it has double-billed the government for olim who arrived with the assistance of other organizations, and that its employee salaries were bloated. Nefesh B'Nefesh denied Haaretz's accusations and maintained that government audited figures showed a 140% increase of aliyah in the ten years of the organization's operation, and that another five-year comprehensive government audit found no irregularities or duplication in Nefesh B'Nefesh's invoicing protocol. Nefesh B'Nefesh also stated that its salaries were well within comparative norms and counter claimed that the Haaretz article was politically motivated.

In 2014, writing for The Times of Israel, Haviv Rettig Gur claimed the recent rise in aliyah had "nothing to do with the organization's laudable work which eased the aliya process for immigrants' but did nothing to increase their numbers." Gur criticized Nefesh B'Nefesh for taking credit for an increase in aliyah that was already on the rebound. He backed up his claim with official statistics that showed American aliyah was just as high in the mid 1990s and that the post year 2000 peak simply "marked an American aliya that had recovered from the terrorism-driven dip of the previous decade."

== Partners ==
Nefesh B'Nefesh works in partnership with the following organizations:

- Friends of the Israel Defense Forces
- Jewish Agency for Israel
- Jewish National Fund
- Marcus Foundation
- Ministry for the Development of the Negev and Galilee
- Ministry of Immigrant Absorption
- Prime Minister's Office

== See also ==
- American Zionist Movement
- Birthright Israel
- Zionist Organization of America
- Yom Haaliyah
