= Moshe Arens =

Israeli politician (1925–2019)

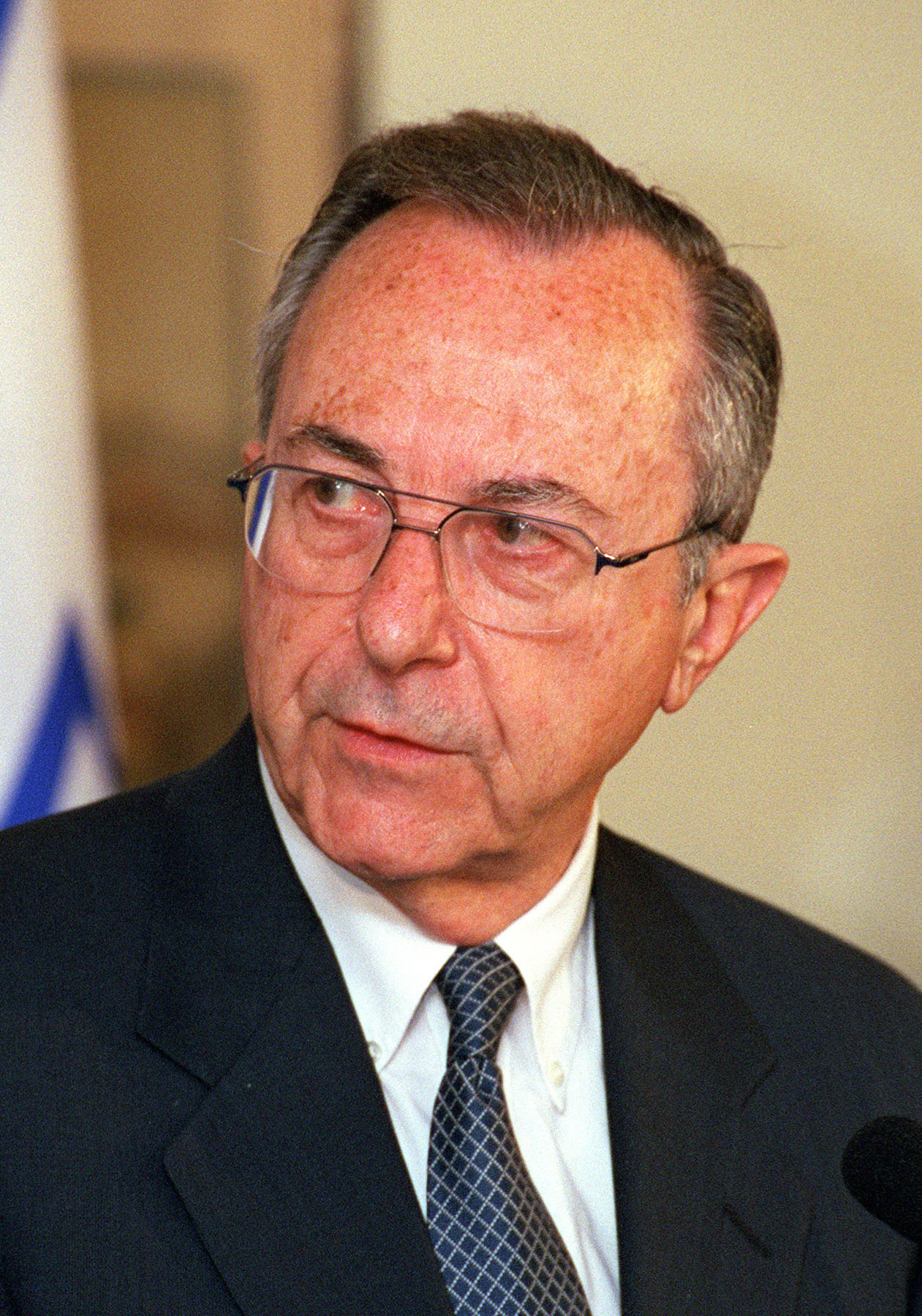
- Arens in April 1999

Ministerial roles
- 1983–1984: Minister of Defense
- 1984–1988: Minister without Portfolio
- 1988–1990: Minister of Foreign Affairs
- 1990–1992: Minister of Defense
- 1999: Minister of Defense

Faction represented in the Knesset
- 1973–1992: Likud
- 1999–2003: Likud

Diplomatic roles
- 1982–1983: Ambassador to the United States

Personal details
- Born: 27 December 1925 Kaunas, Lithuania
- Died: 7 January 2019 (aged 93) Savyon, Israel
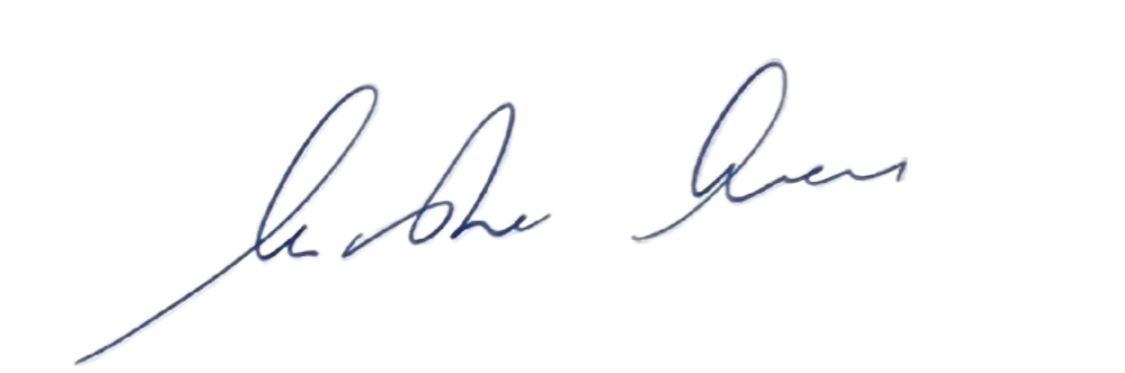
- Signature

Moshe Arens (Hebrew: משה ארנס; 27 December 1925 – 7 January 2019) was an Israeli aeronautical engineer, researcher, diplomat, and Likud politician. A member of the Knesset between 1973 and 1992 and again from 1999 until 2003, he served as Minister of Defense three times and once as Minister of Foreign Affairs. Arens also served as the Israeli ambassador to the U.S. and was a professor at the Technion in Haifa.

== Early life and education ==
Arens was born in Kaunas, Lithuania, to a Jewish family. His father was an industrialist and his mother was a dentist. When he was a year old, his family moved to Riga, Latvia, where he attended elementary school. In 1939, Arens and his family emigrated to the United States, where his father had business interests. The family settled in New York City, where Arens attended George Washington High School.

Arens was a leader in the Betar youth movement, and during World War II served in the United States Army Corps of Engineers as a technical sergeant. He studied mechanical engineering at MIT, graduating with a BSc in 1947. Following the Israeli Declaration of Independence in 1948, Arens emigrated to Israel and joined the militant group Irgun. He was sent to North Africa, mostly Morocco and Algeria, and Europe to help local Jewish communities establish self-defense groups, returning to Israel in March 1949. He became a founding member of the Herut party and worked as an engineer for an American company designing water systems for Tel Aviv.

In 1951, he returned to the U.S. for graduate studies in aeronautical engineering at the California Institute of Technology, where he was a student of Qian Xuesen. He then worked for a time in the aircraft industry.

== Academic and research career ==
From 1957 to 1962, Arens was an associate professor of aeronautical engineering at the Technion. He subsequently served as Deputy Director General for Engineering at Israel Aircraft Industries from 1962 to 1971. He oversaw major projects, including the IAI Arava transport plane and IAI Kfir fighter jet development projects, and published articles in academic journals on propulsion and flight mechanics. After retiring from the government, he devoted himself to researching and commemorating the story of the Jewish Military Union (ŻZW), which fought alongside the better known Jewish Combat Organization (ŻOB) in the Warsaw Ghetto Uprising. Arens wrote several articles and a book, Flags over the Warsaw Ghetto, on the revolt. The book has been published in Hebrew, Polish, and English.

Arens was chairman of the International Board of Governors of Ariel University Center of Samaria. He was also a columnist for the newspaper Haaretz.

== Political career ==
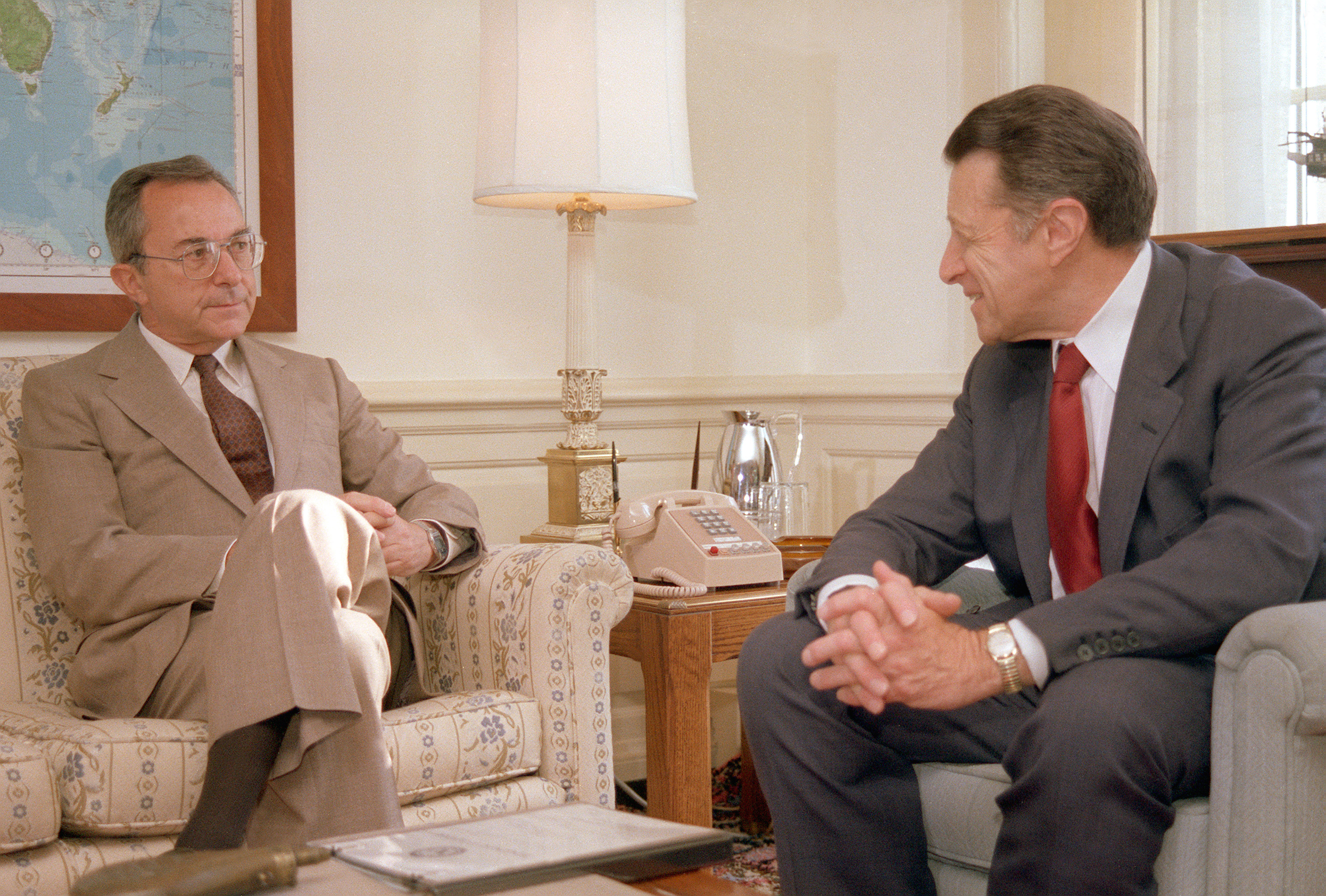
Arens meeting with U.S. Secretary of Defense Caspar Weinberger in 1983

After the Yom Kippur War, Arens entered politics and was elected to the Knesset as a member of Likud in the 1973 elections. After being re-elected in 1977, he became chairman of the Foreign Affairs and Defense Committee. He voted against the Camp David Accords and the Egypt–Israel peace treaty. In 1980, Prime Minister Menachem Begin offered Arens the post of Minister of Defense, but he turned it down due to his disagreement over the terms of the Egypt–Israel Peace Treaty. Arens did not oppose peace with Egypt, but was opposed to certain aspects of the treaty, and thus did not want to have to oversee Israel's evacuation from the Sinai.

He was re-elected in 1981, but resigned from the Knesset on 19 January 1982 when appointed ambassador to the United States. At this point, he brought his young protégé, Benjamin Netanyahu, then 32, to work for him in Washington. He returned to Israel in February 1983 after being appointed Minister of Defense, replacing Ariel Sharon, who had been forced out of office following the Kahan Commission's report on the Sabra and Shatila massacre. He was re-elected in 1984, but was only appointed Minister without Portfolio. After another re-election in 1988 he was appointed Minister of Foreign Affairs (with Netanyahu his deputy), and in 1990 returned to the Defense portfolio.

After Likud lost the 1992 elections, Arens retired from politics. He returned in 1999, however, to challenge Netanyahu for the Likud leadership. Although he won only 18% of the vote, Netanyahu appointed him Minister of Defense, replacing Yitzhak Mordechai, who had left Likud to establish the Centre Party. Although Arens returned to the Knesset after the 1999 elections, Likud lost the elections and he left the cabinet. He lost his seat for the final time in 2003.

Arens questioned the wisdom of Lockheed Martin F-35 Lightning II Israeli procurement, given the neglected state of Israeli ground forces. In an article for Fathom Journal, Arens stated that he was an opponent of unilateral withdrawal from the West Bank and Gaza, accusing its proponents of suffering from "unilateral withdrawal syndrome".

== Personal life ==
While living in the United States, Arens married Muriel F. Eisenberg from New York City, and she moved to Israel with him. The couple had four children, two boys and two girls: Yigal, Aliza, Raanan, and Ruth. Arens died on 7 January 2019 at the age of 93. Streets in Ramla, Herzliya and Beit Shemesh are named after him.

== Published works ==
- Optimum staging of cruising aircraft. Haifa: Technion – Israel Institute of Technology, Department of Aeronautical Engineering, 1959.
- Some requirements for the efficient attainment of range by air-borne vehicles. Haifa: Technion – Israel Institute of Technology, Department of Aeronautical Engineering, 1959.
- A hypersonic ramjet using a normal detonation wave. Jerusalem: Weizmann Science Press of Israel, 1960.
- Moshe Arens, Statesman and Scientist Speaks Out. (With Merrill Simon) New York: Dean Books, 1988.
- Broken covenant: American foreign policy and the crisis between the U.S. and Israel. New York: Simon & Schuster, 1995.
- Flags Over the Warsaw Ghetto: The Untold Story of the Warsaw Ghetto Uprising. Jerusalem: Gefen, 2011.
- In Defense of Israel: A Memoir of a Political Life. Washington, D.C.: Brookings, 2018.

== Awards and recognition ==
In 1971, Arens won the Israel Defense Prize. In 2016, Nefesh B'Nefesh awarded him the Bonei Zion Prize.
