= Scorched earth =

Military strategy

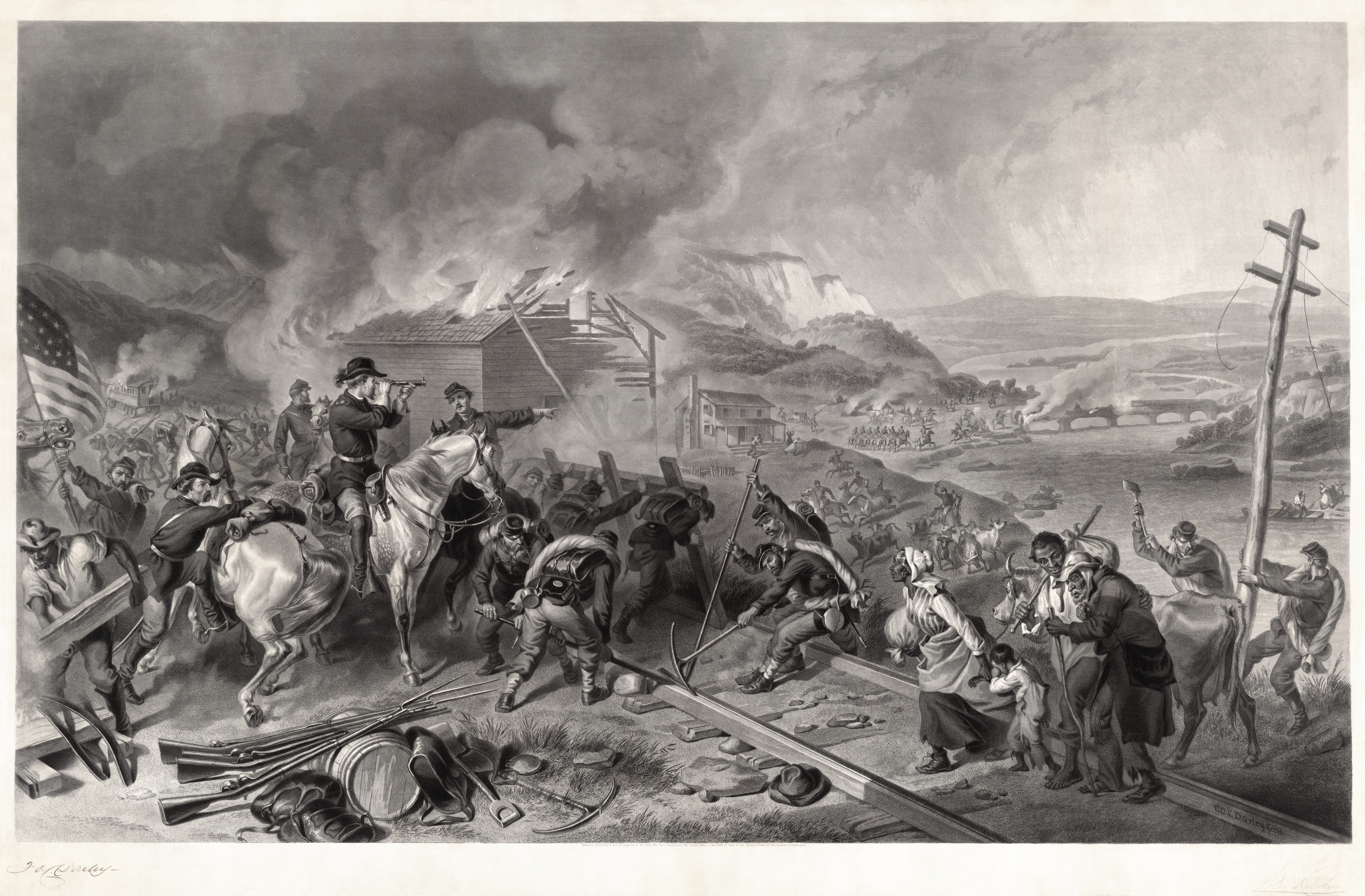
The Union army engaging in a scorched-earth policy as part of Sherman's March to the Sea

A scorched-earth policy is a military strategy of destroying everything that allows an enemy military force to be able to fight a war, including the deprivation and destruction of water, food, humans, animals, plants and any kind of tools and infrastructure. Its use is possible by a retreating army to leave nothing of value worth taking, to weaken the attacking force, or by an advancing army to fight against unconventional warfare.

Scorched earth against non-combatants has been banned under the 1977 Geneva Conventions. (Note: The strategy of destroying the supply of food and water to the civilian population in an area of conflict has been banned under Article 54 of Protocol I of the 1977 Geneva Conventions)

It is prohibited to attack, destroy, remove, or render useless objects indispensable to the survival of the civilian population, such as foodstuffs, agricultural areas for the production of foodstuffs, crops, livestock, drinking water installations and supplies, and irrigation works, for the specific purpose of denying them for their sustenance value to the civilian population or to the adverse Party, whatever the motive, whether in order to starve out civilians, to cause them to move away, or for any other motive.

== Origin of the term ==
The term was found in English in a 1937 report on the Second Sino-Japanese War. The retreating Chinese forces burned crops and destroyed infrastructure, including cities, to sabotage the logistics of the advancing Japanese forces.

== Military theory ==
Clausewitz wrote in Principles of War:

In defensive just as in offensive warfare, it is necessary to pursue a great aim: the destruction of the enemy army, either by battle or by rendering its subsistence extremely difficult. Thus we shall disorganize it and force it into a retreat, during which it will necessarily suffer great losses. Wellington's campaign in 1810 and 1811 is a good example.

Clausewitz wrote in On War:

All that the country yields will be taken for the benefit of the retreating army first, and will be mostly consumed. Nothing remains but wasted villages and towns, fields from which the crops have been gathered, or which are trampled down, empty wells, and muddy brooks. The pursuing army, therefore, from the very first day, has frequently to contend with the most pressing wants.

== Historic examples ==
=== 6th century BC ===
==== European Scythian campaign ====
The Scythians used scorched-earth methods against the Persian Achaemenid Empire, led by King Darius the Great, during his European Scythian campaign. The Scythians, who were nomadic herders, evaded the Persian invaders and retreated into the depths of the steppes after they had destroyed food supplies and poisoned wells.

=== 4th century BC ===
==== March of the Ten Thousand ====
The Greek general Xenophon recorded in his Anabasis that the withdrawing enemy burnt up the grass and everything else that was good for use in front of the Ten Thousand.

=== 3rd century BC ===
==== Second Punic War ====
During the Second Punic War in 218–202 BCE, both Carthaginians and Romans used the method selectively during Hannibal's invasion of Italy. After the Roman defeat at Lake Trasimene, Quintus Fabius Maximus instructed those living in the path of the invading Carthaginians to burn their houses and grain.

=== 2nd century BC ===
==== Third Punic War ====
After the end of the Third Punic War in 146 BC, the Roman Senate also elected to use this method to permanently destroy the Carthaginian capital city, Carthage (near modern-day Tunis). The buildings were torn down, their stones scattered so not even rubble remained, and the fields were burned. However, the story that they salted the earth is apocryphal.

=== 1st century BC ===
==== Gallic Wars ====
The system of punitive destruction of property and subjugation of people when accompanying a military campaign was known as vastatio. Two of the first uses of scorched earth recorded happened in the Gallic Wars. The first was used when the Celtic Helvetii were forced to evacuate their homes in Southern Germany and Switzerland because of incursions of unfriendly Germanic tribes: to add incentive to the march, the Helvetii destroyed everything they could not bring.

The second case shows actual military value: during the Great Gallic War the Gauls under Vercingetorix planned to lure the Roman armies into Gaul and then trap and obliterate them. They thus ravaged the countryside of what are now the Benelux countries and France. This caused immense problems for the Romans, but the Roman military triumphed over the Gallic alliance.

=== 4th century AD ===
==== Roman invasion of Persia ====
In the year CE 363, the Emperor Julian's invasion of Persia was turned back by a scorched-earth policy:

The extensive region that lies between the River Tigris and the mountains of Media ...was in a very improved state of cultivation. Julian might expect, that a conqueror, who possessed the two forcible instruments of persuasion, steel and gold, would easily procure a plentiful subsistence from the fears or avarice of the natives. But, on the approach of the Romans, the rich and smiling prospect was instantly blasted. Wherever they moved ... the cattle was driven away; the grass and ripe corn were consumed with fire; and, as soon as the flames had subsided which interrupted the march of Julian, he beheld the melancholy face of a smoking and naked desert. This desperate but effectual method of defence can only be executed by the enthusiasm of a people who prefer their independence to their property; or by the rigor of an arbitrary government, which consults the public safety without submitting to their inclinations the liberty of choice.

=== 7th century AD ===
==== First Fitna ====
During the First Fitna (656–661), Muawiyah I sent Busr ibn Abi Artat to a campaign in the Hejaz and Yemen to ravage territory loyal to Muawiyah's opponent Ali ibn Abi Talib. According to Tabari, 30,000 civilians are estimated to have been killed during that campaign of the civil war. Muawiyah also sent Sufyan ibn Awf to Iraq to burn the crops and homes of Ali's supporters.

=== 9th century AD ===
==== Viking invasion of England ====
During the Viking invasion of England, the Viking chieftain Hastein tried to occupy the ruined Roman fortress of Chester in the late summer of 893, planning to raid northern Mercia from the refortified fortress. However, the Mercians destroyed all crops and livestock in the surrounding countryside and expelled the Vikings successfully.

=== 11th century ===
==== Harrying of the North ====
In the Harrying of the North, William the Conqueror's solution to stop a rebellion in 1069 was the brutal conquest and subjugation of northern England. William's men burnt whole villages from the Humber to Tees and slaughtered the inhabitants. Food stores and livestock were destroyed so that anyone surviving the initial massacre would soon succumb to starvation over the winter. The destruction is depicted in the Bayeux Tapestry. The survivors were reduced to cannibalism, with one report stating that the skulls of the dead were cracked open so that their brains could be eaten. Between 100,000 and 150,000 perished, and the area took centuries to recover from the damage.

=== 14th century ===
==== Hundred Years' War ====
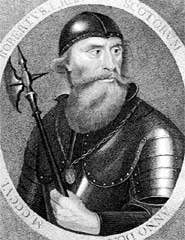
Robert the Bruce

During the Hundred Years' War, both the English and the French conducted chevauchée raids over the enemy territory to damage its infrastructure.

Robert the Bruce counselled using scorched earth to frustrate the invasion of Scotland by Edward I of England, according to an anonymous 14th-century poem:

in strait places gar keep all store,
And byrnen ye plainland them before,
That they shall pass away in haist
What that they find na thing but waist.
... This is the counsel and intent
Of gud King Robert's testiment.

==== Wars of Scottish Independence ====
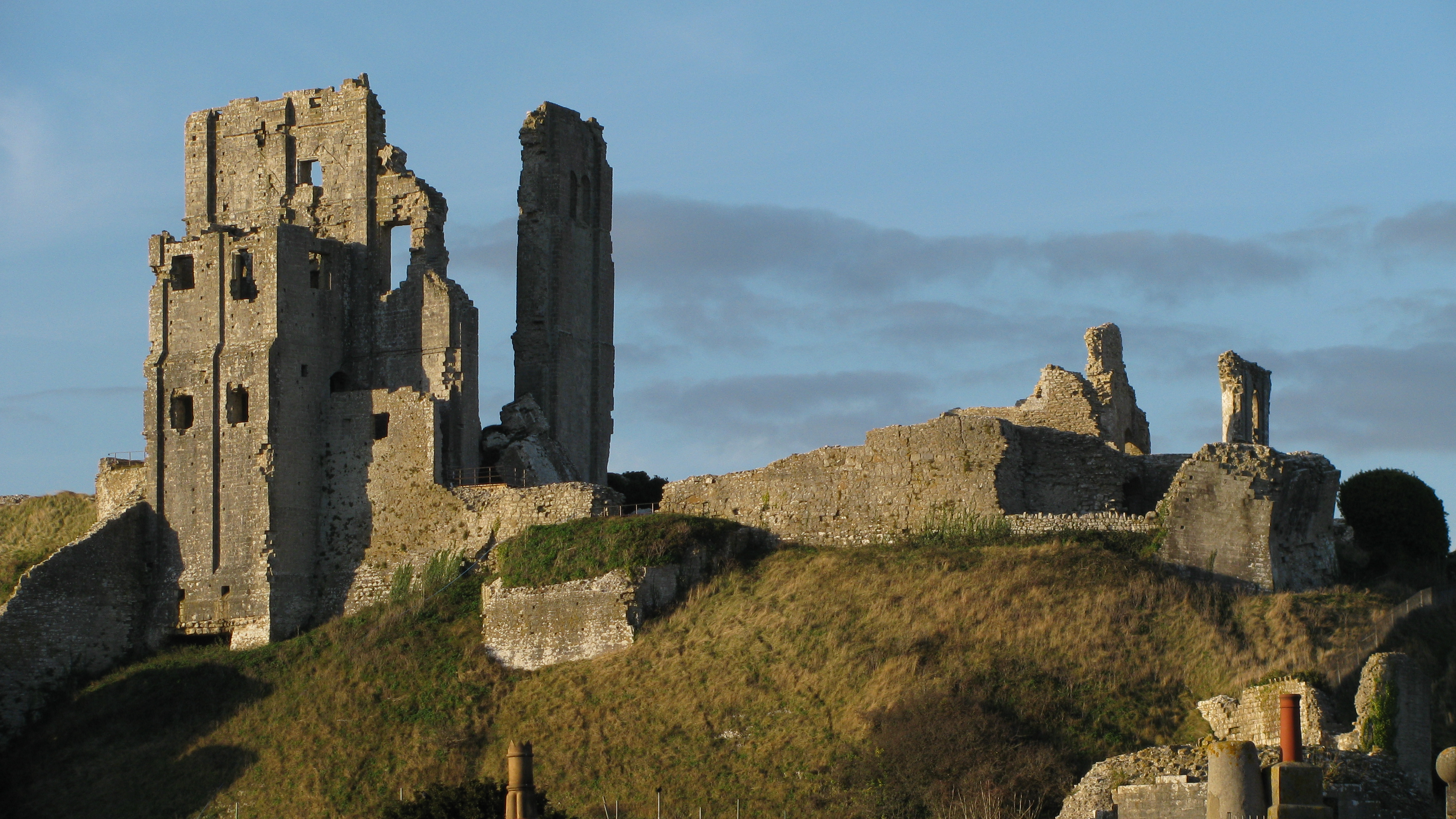
Corfe Castle was slighted during the English Civil War so that its defences could not be reused.

A slighting is the deliberate destruction, whether partial or complete, of a fortification without opposition. Sometimes, such as during the Wars of Scottish Independence and the English Civil War, it was done to render the structure unusable as a fortress. In England, adulterine (unauthorised) castles would usually be slighted if captured by a king. During the Wars of Scottish Independence, Robert the Bruce adopted a strategy of slighting Scottish castles to prevent them from being occupied by the invading English.

==== Crusades ====
A strategy of slighting castles in the Holy Land was also adopted by the Mamlukes during their wars with the Crusaders.

=== 15th century ===
==== Moldavian–Ottoman Wars ====
Stephen the Great used scorched earth in the Carpathians against the Ottoman Army in 1475 and 1476.

==== Wallachian–Ottoman Wars ====
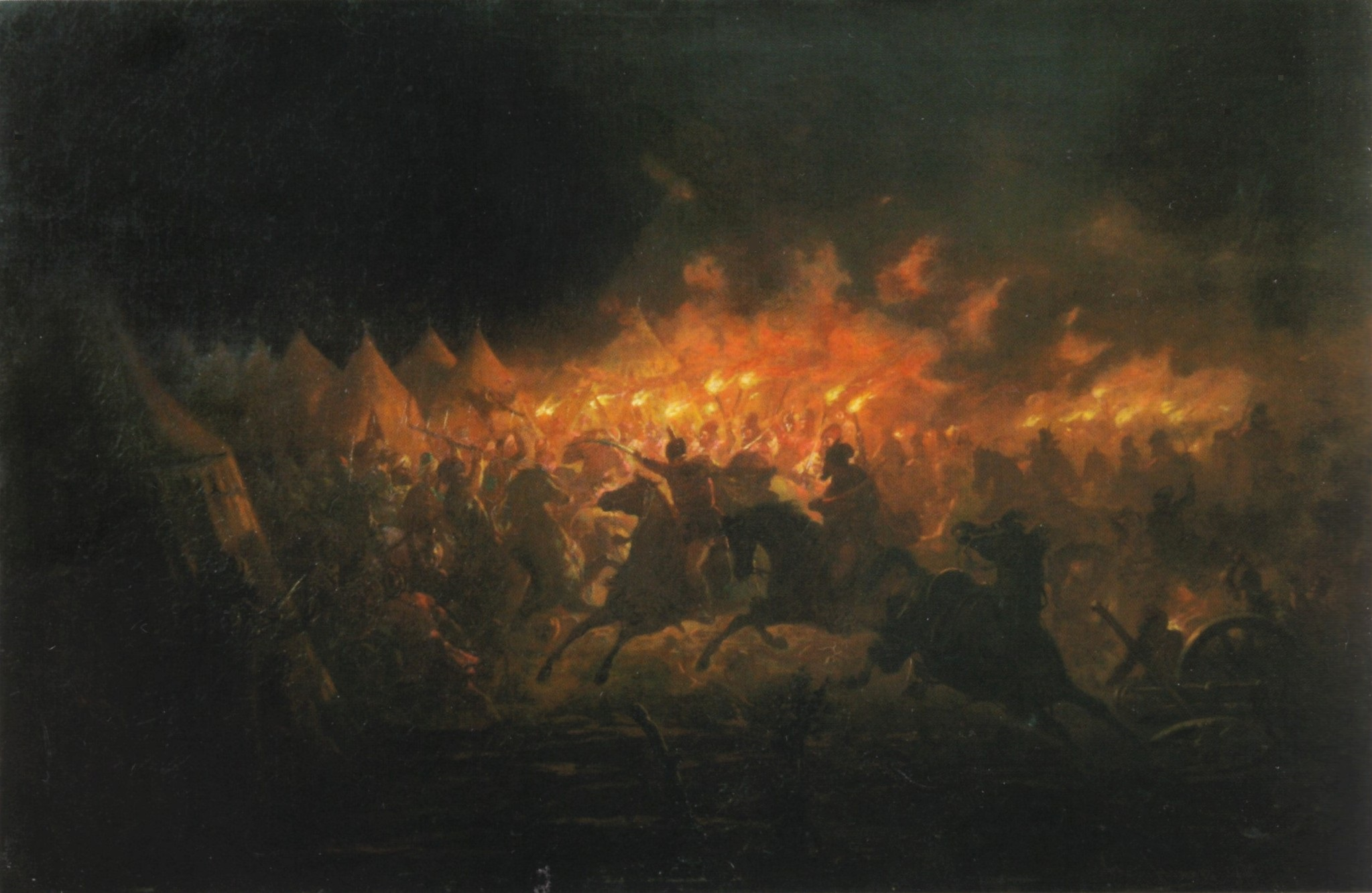
The forces of Vlad the Impaler were associated with torches, particularly outside Târgoviște.

In 1462, a massive Ottoman army, led by Sultan Mehmed II, marched into Wallachia. Vlad the Impaler retreated to Transylvania. During his departure, he conducted scorched-earth tactics to ward off Mehmed's approach. When the Ottoman forces approached Tirgoviste, they encountered over 20,000 people impaled by the forces of Vlad the Impaler, creating a "forest" of dead or dying bodies on stakes. The atrocious, gut-wrenching sight caused Mehmed to withdraw from battle and send instead Radu, Vlad's brother, to fight Vlad the Impaler.

=== 16th century ===
==== Tudor conquest of Ireland ====
Further use of scorched-earth policies in war was seen during the Tudor conquest of Ireland, where it was used by English commanders such as Walter Devereux and Richard Bingham.

The Desmond Rebellions were a famous case in Ireland. Much of the province of Munster was laid waste. The poet Edmund Spenser left an account of it:

In those late wars in Munster; for not withstanding that the same was a most rich and plentiful country, full of corn and cattle, that you would have thought they could have been able to stand long, yet ere one year and a half they were brought to such wretchedness, as that any stony heart would have rued the same. Out of every corner of the wood and glens they came creeping forth upon their hands, for their legs could not bear them; they looked Anatomies [of] death, they spoke like ghosts, crying out of their graves; they did eat of the carrions, happy where they could find them, yea, and one another soon after, in so much as the very carcasses they spared not to scrape out of their graves; and if they found a plot of water-cresses or shamrocks, there they flocked as to a feast for the time, yet not able long to continue therewithal; that in a short space there were none almost left, and a most populous and plentiful country suddenly left void of man or beast.

==== Great Siege of Malta ====
In early 1565, Grandmaster Jean Parisot de Valette ordered the harvesting of all the crops in Malta, including unripened grain, to deprive the Ottomans of any local food supplies since spies had warned of an imminent Ottoman attack. Furthermore, the Knights poisoned all of the wells with bitter herbs and dead animals. The Ottomans arrived on 18 May, and the Great Siege of Malta began. The Ottomans managed to capture one fort but were eventually defeated by the Knights, the Maltese militia, and a Spanish relief force.

=== 17th century ===
==== Thirty Years' War ====
In 1630, Field-Marshal General Torquato Conti was in command of the Holy Roman Empire's forces during the Thirty Years' War. Forced to retreat from the advancing Swedish army of King Gustavus Adolphus, Conti ordered his troops to burn houses, destroy villages and cause as much harm generally to property and people as possible.:

To revenge himself upon the Duke of Pomerania, the imperial general permitted his troops, upon his retreat, to exercise every barbarity on the unfortunate inhabitants of Pomerania, who had already suffered but too severely from his avarice. On pretence of cutting off the resources of the Swedes, the whole country was laid waste and plundered; and often, when the Imperialists were unable any longer to maintain a place, it was laid in ashes, in order to leave the enemy nothing but ruins.

==== Swedish Deluge ====
From 1655 to 1660, the Swedish army robbed Poland of her most precious goods – thousands of works of art, books and valuables. Almost all cities, towns, castles and churches in locations where Swedish troops were stationed were destroyed, and in guides to many Polish towns and cities one can find notes that read "object destroyed during Swedish invasion". Of all major cities of the country, only Lwów and Gdańsk were not destroyed, and when Swedish soldiers were unable to steal an item, they would destroy or burn it. In ruins were castles, palaces, churches, abbeys, towns and villages. As a result of the Swedish invasion, few pre-Baroque buildings remained in Poland. An estimated 3 million died.

==== Nine Years' War ====
In 1688, France attacked the German Electoral Palatinate. The German states responded by forming an alliance and assembling a sizeable armed force to push the French out of Germany. The French had not prepared for such an eventuality. Realising that the war in Germany was not going to end quickly and that the war would not be a brief and decisive parade of French glory, Louis XIV and War Minister Marquis de Louvois resolved upon a scorched-earth policy in the Palatinate, Baden and Württemberg. The French were intent on denying enemy troops local resources and on preventing the Germans from invading France. By 20 December 1688, Louvois had selected all the cities, towns, villages and châteaux intended for destruction. On 2 March 1689, the Count of Tessé torched Heidelberg, and on 8 March, Montclar levelled Mannheim. Oppenheim and Worms were finally destroyed on 31 May, followed by Speyer on 1 June, and Bingen on 4 June. In all, French troops burnt over 20 substantial towns as well as numerous villages.

==== Mughal–Maratha Wars ====
In the Maratha Empire, Shivaji Maharaj had introduced scorched-earth tactics, known as Ganimi Kava. His forces looted traders and businessmen from Aurangzeb's Mughal Empire and burnt down his cities, but they were strictly ordered not to rape or hurt the innocent civilians and not to cause any sort of disrespect to any of the religious institutes.

Shivaji's son, Sambhaji Maharaj, was detested throughout the Mughal Empire for his scorched-earth tactics until he and his men were captured by Muqarrab Khan and his Mughal Army contingent of 25,000. On 11 March 1689, a panel of Mughal qadis indicted and sentenced Sambhaji to death on accusations of casual torture, arson, looting and massacres but most prominently for giving shelter to Sultan Muhammad Akbar, the fourth son of Aurangzeb, who had sought Sambhaji's aid in winning the Mughal throne from the emperor, his father. Sambhaji was particularly condemned for the three days of ravaging committed after the Battle of Burhanpur.

=== 18th century ===
==== Great Northern War ====
During the Great Northern War, Russian Emperor Peter the Great's forces used scorched-earth tactics to hold back Swedish King Charles XII's campaign towards Moscow in 1707–1708.

==== Sullivan–Clinton Campaign ====
In 1779, the Continental Congress of the United States decided to defeat the four British allied nations of the Iroquois decisively during the American Revolutionary War with the Sullivan Expedition. General John Sullivan used a scorched earth campaign by destroying more than 40 Iroquois villages and their stores of winter crops resulting in many deaths by starvation and cold in the following winter.

==== Haitian Revolution against Napoleon ====
In a letter to Jean-Jacques Dessalines, Toussaint Louverture outlined his plans for defeating the French in the Haitian Revolution starting in 1791 using scorched-earth: "Do not forget, while waiting for the rainy reason which will rid us of our foes, that we have no other resource than destruction and fire. Bear in mind that the soil bathed with our sweat must not furnish our enemies with the smallest sustenance. Tear up the roads with shot; throw corpses and horses into all the foundations, burn and annihilate everything in order that those who have come to reduce us to slavery may have before their eyes the image of the hell which they deserve".

=== 19th century ===
==== Napoleonic Wars ====
During the third Napoleonic invasion of Portugal in 1810, the Portuguese population retreated towards Lisbon and was ordered to destroy all the food supplies the French might capture as well as forage and shelter in a wide belt across the country. (Although effective food-preserving techniques had recently been invented, they were still not fit for military use because a suitably-rugged container had not yet been invented.) The command was obeyed as a result of French plundering and general ill-treatment of civilians in the previous invasions. The civilians would rather destroy anything that had to be left behind, rather than leave it to the French. When the French armies reached the Lines of Torres Vedras on the way to Lisbon, French soldiers reported that the country "seemed to empty ahead of them". Low morale, hunger, disease and indiscipline greatly weakened the French army and compelled the forces to retreat.

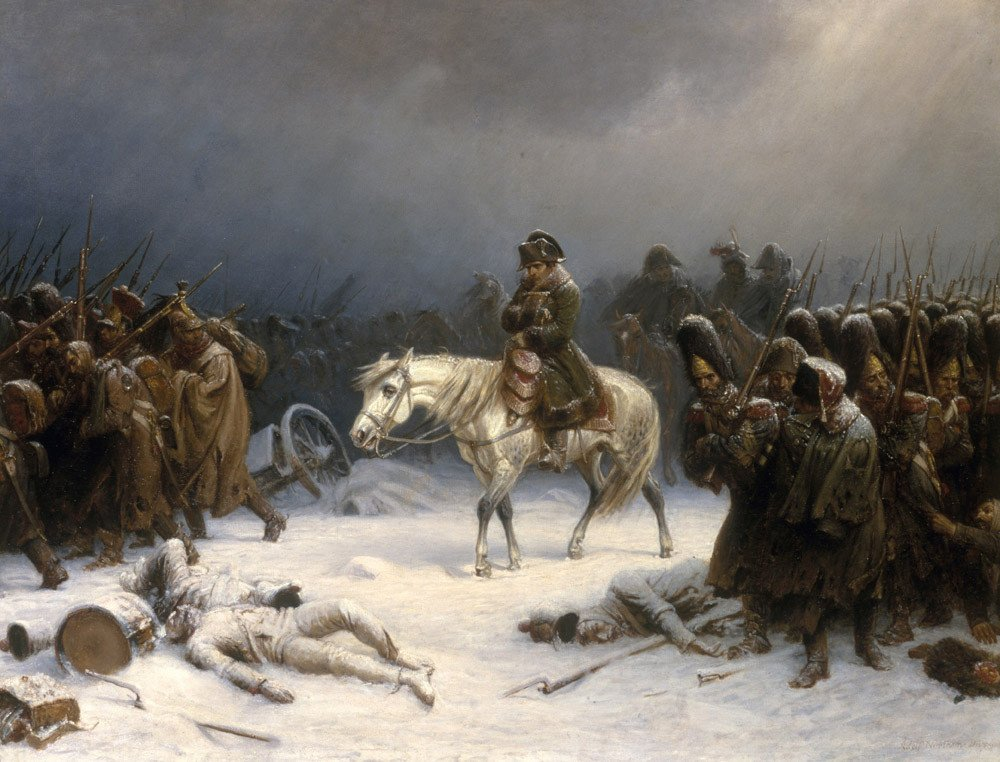
Napoleon's retreat from Moscow

In 1812, Emperor Alexander I was able to render Napoleon's invasion of Russia useless by using a scorched-earth policy. As Russians withdrew from the advancing French army, they burned the countryside over which they passed (and allegedly Moscow), leaving nothing of value for the pursuing French army. Encountering only desolate land, Napoleon's Grande Armée favored doctrine of living off the lands it conquered was now ineffective. Pushing relentlessly on despite dwindling numbers, the Grand Army met with disaster as the invasion progressed. Napoleon's army arrived in a virtually-abandoned Moscow, which was a tattered starving shell of its former self, largely because of scorched-earth tactics by the retreating Russians. Having conquered essentially nothing, Napoleon's troops retreated, with the scorched-earth policy having an increasingly punitive effect — even though the French had established large supply dumps during the advance, the route between these had both been scorched and marched over once already. Thus, the French army starved as it marched along the now barren invasion route.

==== South American War of Independence ====
In August 1812, Argentine General Manuel Belgrano led the Jujuy Exodus, a massive forced displacement of people from what is now Jujuy and Salta Provinces to the south. The Jujuy Exodus was conducted by the patriot forces of the Army of the North, which was battling a Royalist army.

Belgrano, faced with the prospect of total defeat and territorial loss, ordered all people to pack their necessities, including food and furniture, and to follow him in carriages or on foot together with whatever cattle and beasts of burden that could endure the journey. The rest (houses, crops, food stocks and any objects made of iron) was to be burned to deprive the Royalists of resources. The strict scorched-earth policy made him ask on 29 July 1812 the people of Jujuy to "show their heroism" and to join the march of the army under his command "if, as you assure, you want to be free". The punishment for ignoring the order was execution, with the destruction of the defector's properties. Belgrano labored to win the support of the populace and later reported that most of the people had willingly followed him without the need for force.

The exodus started on 23 August and gathered people from Jujuy and Salta. People travelled south about 250 km and finally arrived at the banks of the Pasaje River, in Tucumán Province in the early hours of 29 August. They applied a scorched-earth policy and so the Spaniards advanced into a wasteland. Belgrano's army destroyed everything that could provide shelter or be useful to the Royalists.

==== Greek War of Independence ====
In 1827, Ibrahim Pasha of Egypt led an Ottoman-Egyptian combined force in a campaign to crush Greek revolutionaries in the Peloponnese. In response to Greek guerrilla attacks on his forces in the Peloponnese, Ibrahim launched a scorched earth campaign that threatened the population with starvation and deported many civilians into slavery in Egypt. The fires of burning villages and fields were clearly visible from Allied ships standing offshore. A British landing party reported that the population of Messinia was close to mass starvation. Ibrahim's scorched-earth policy caused much outrage in Europe, which was one factor for the Great Powers (United Kingdom, the Kingdom of France and the Russian Empire) decisively intervening against him in the Battle of Navarino.

==== American Civil War ====
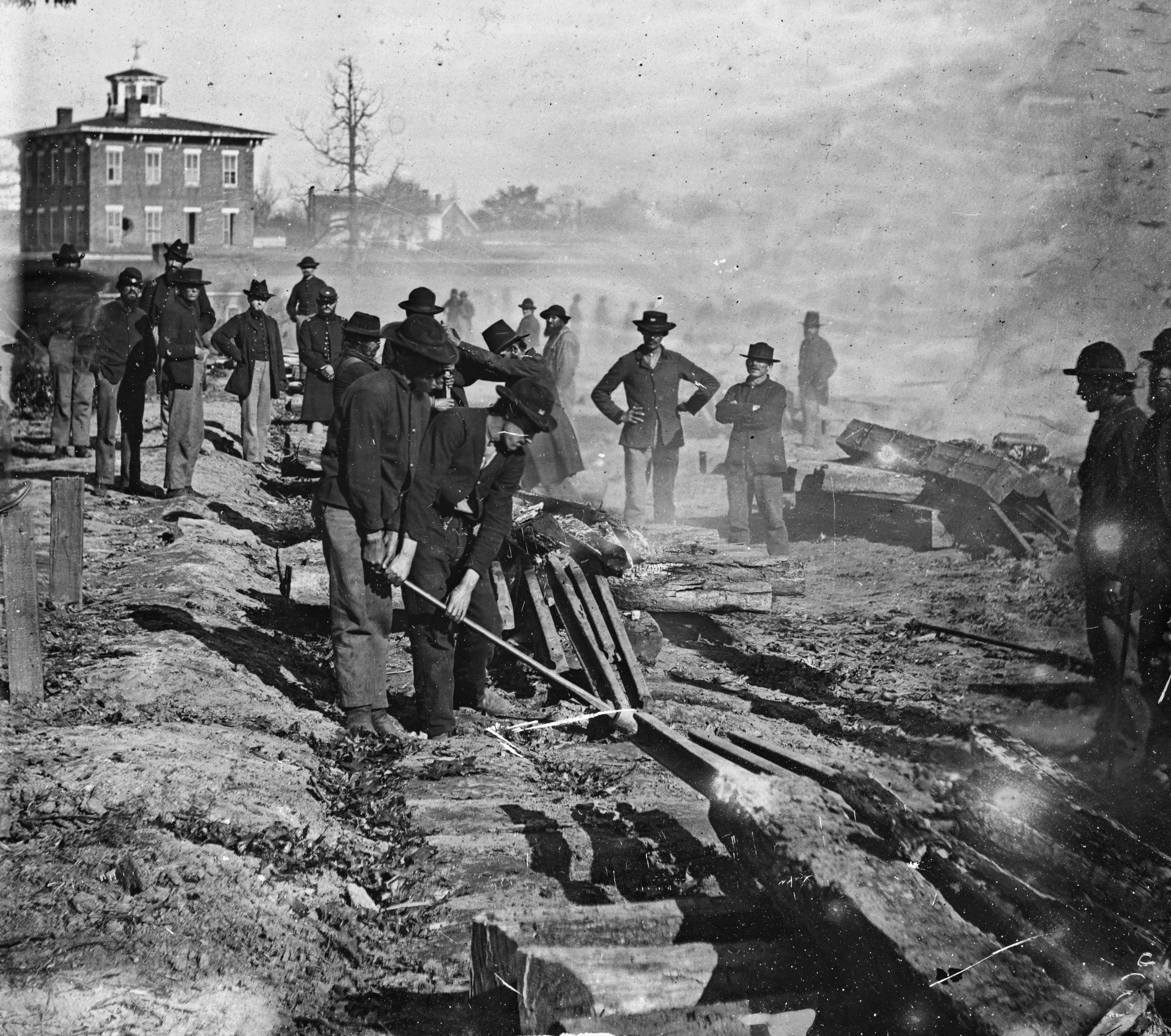
William Tecumseh Sherman's troops destroying a railroad near Atlanta

In the American Civil War, Union forces under Philip Sheridan and William Tecumseh Sherman used the policy widely:

supplies within the reach of Confederate armies I regarded as much contraband as arms or ordnance stores. Their destruction was accomplished without bloodshed and tended to the same result as the destruction of armies. I continued this policy to the close of the war. Promiscuous pillaging, however, was discouraged and punished. Instructions were always given to take provisions and forage under the direction of commissioned officers who should give receipts to owners, if at home, and turn the property over to officers of the quartermaster or commissary departments to be issued as if furnished from our Northern depots. But much was destroyed without receipts to owners when it could not be brought within our lines and would otherwise have gone to the support of secession and rebellion. This policy I believe exercised a material influence in hastening the end.

General Sherman used that policy during his March to the Sea.

Another event, in response to William Quantrill's raid on Lawrence, Kansas, and the many civilian casualties, including the killing of 150 men, Brigadier General Thomas Ewing Jr., Sherman's brother-in-law, issued US Army General Order No. 11 (1863) to order the near-total evacuation of three-and-a-half counties in western Missouri, south of Kansas City, which were subsequently looted and burned by US Army troops. Under Sherman's overall direction, General Philip Sheridan followed that policy in the Shenandoah Valley of Virginia and then in the Indian Wars of the Great Plains.

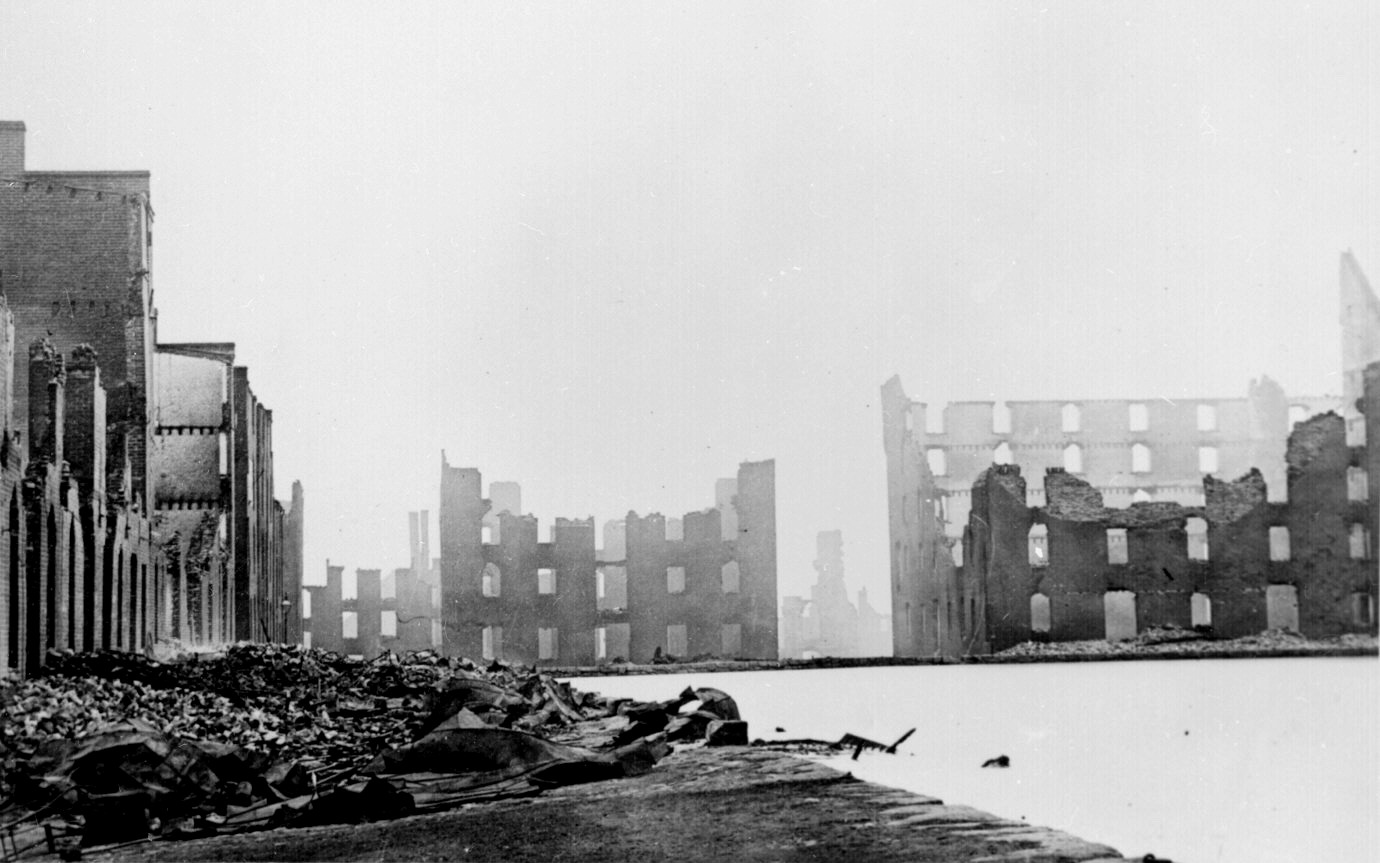
The ruins of Richmond, Virginia, after it was burned by retreating Confederate soldiers in April 1865

When General Ulysses Grant's forces broke through the defenses of Richmond, Virginia, Confederate President Jefferson Davis ordered the destruction of Richmond's military supplies. The resulting fires quickly spread to other buildings, as well as to the Confederate warships docked on the James River. Civilians in panic were forced to escape the city as it quickly burned.

==== Native American Wars ====
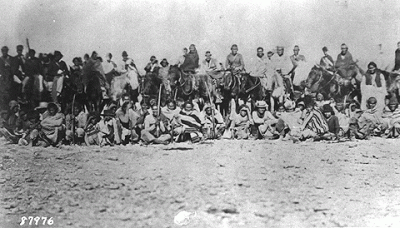
Navajo on the "Long Walk"

During the wars with Native American tribes of the American West, Kit Carson, under James Henry Carleton's direction, instituted a scorched-earth policy, burning fields and homes destroying any livestock. He was aided by other Indian tribes with long-standing enmity toward the Navajos, chiefly the Ute tribe. The Navajo were forced to surrender because of the destruction of their livestock and food supplies. In the spring of 1864, 8000 Navajo men, women, and children were forced to march 300 miles to Fort Sumner, New Mexico. Navajos call it "The Long Walk."

==== Second Boer War ====
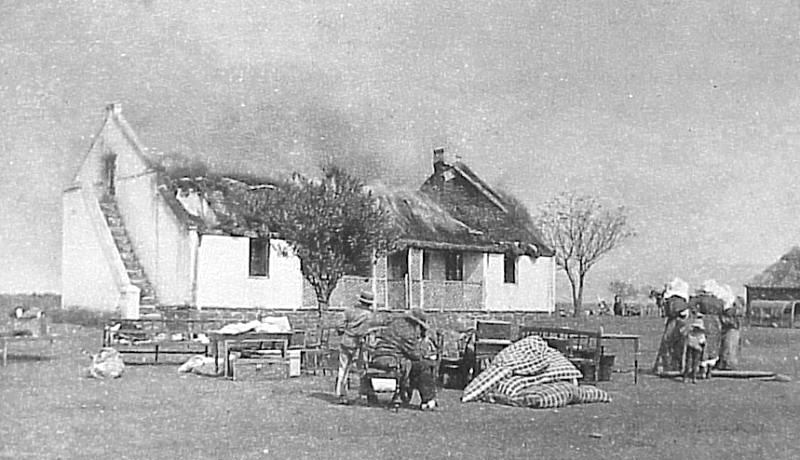
Boer civilians watching British soldiers blow up their house with dynamite after they had been given 10 minutes to gather their belongings

During the Second Boer War (1899–1902), British forces applied a scorched-earth policy in the occupied Boer republics under the direction of General Lord Kitchener. Numerous Boers, refusing to accept military defeat, adopted guerrilla warfare despite the capture of both of their capital cities. As a result, under Lord Kitchener's command British forces initiated a policy of the destruction of the farms and the homes of civilians in the republics to prevent the Boers who were still fighting from obtaining food and supplies. Boer noncombatants inhabiting the republics (mostly women and children) were interned in concentration camps to prevent them from supplying guerillas still in the field.

The existence of the concentration camps was exposed by English activist Emily Hobhouse, who toured the camps and began petitioning the British government to change its policy. In an attempt to counter Hobhouse's activism, the British government commissioned the Fawcett Commission, but it confirmed Hobhouse's findings. The British government then said that it perceived the concentration camps to be humanitarian measure and were established to care for displaced noncombatants until the war's end, in response to mounting criticism of the camps in Britain. A number of factors, including outbreaks of infectious diseases, a lack of planning and supplies for the camps, and overcrowding led to numerous internees dying in the camps. A decade after the war, historian P. L. A. Goldman estimated that 27,927 Boers died in the concentration camps, 26,251 women and children (of whom more than 22,000 were under the age of 16) and 1,676 men, with 1,421 being above the age of 16. The number of Black Africans who also suffered the same is unknown.

==== New Zealand Wars ====
In 1868, the Tūhoe, who had sheltered the Māori leader Te Kooti, were thus subjected to a scorched-earth policy in which their crops and buildings were destroyed and the people of fighting age were captured.

=== 20th century ===
==== World War I ====
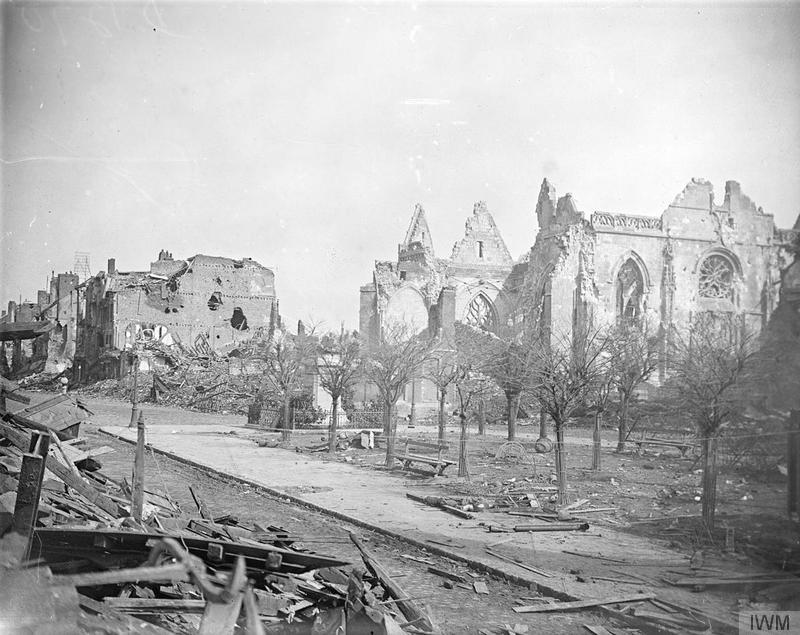
Ruins of the church of St. Jean in Péronne, blown up by the Germans in March 1917

On the Eastern Front of World War I, the Imperial Russian Army created a zone of destruction by using a massive scorched-earth strategy during their retreat from the Imperial German Army in the summer and the autumn of 1915. The Russian troops, retreating along a front of more than 600 miles, destroyed anything that might be of use to their enemy, including crops, houses, railways and entire cities. They also forcibly removed huge numbers of people. In pushing the Russian troops back into Russia's interior, the German army gained a large area of territory from the Russian Empire that is now Poland, Ukraine, Belarus, Latvia and Lithuania.

In late 1916 the British army set fire to the Romanian oil fields in order to prevent the Central Powers from capturing them. 800 million litres of oil were burned.

On the Western Front on 24 February 1917, the German army made a strategic scorched-earth withdrawal (Operation Alberich) from the Somme battlefield to the prepared fortifications of the Hindenburg Line to shorten the line that had to be occupied. Since a scorched-earth campaign requires a war of movement, the Western Front provided little opportunity for the policy as the war was mostly a stalemate and was fought mostly in the same concentrated area for its entire duration.

==== Greco-Turkish War ====
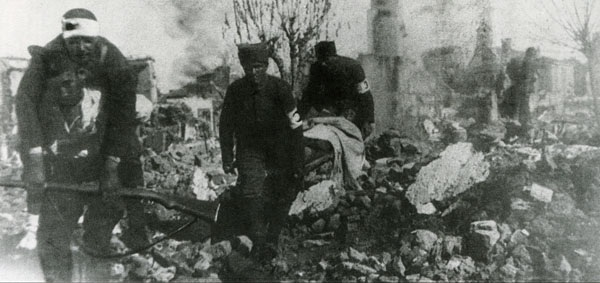
Turkish medics arrived at a town to rescue wounded on the way to Izmir after Greek forces abandoned the town (August 1922).

During the Greco-Turkish War (1919–1922), the retreating Greek Army carried out a scorched-earth policy while it was fleeing from Anatolia in the final phase of the war. The historian Sydney Nettleton Fisher wrote, "The Greek army in retreat pursued a burned-earth policy and committed every known outrage against defenceless Turkish villagers in its path".

Norman Naimark noted that "the Greek retreat was even more devastating for the local population than the occupation".

==== Second Sino-Japanese War ====
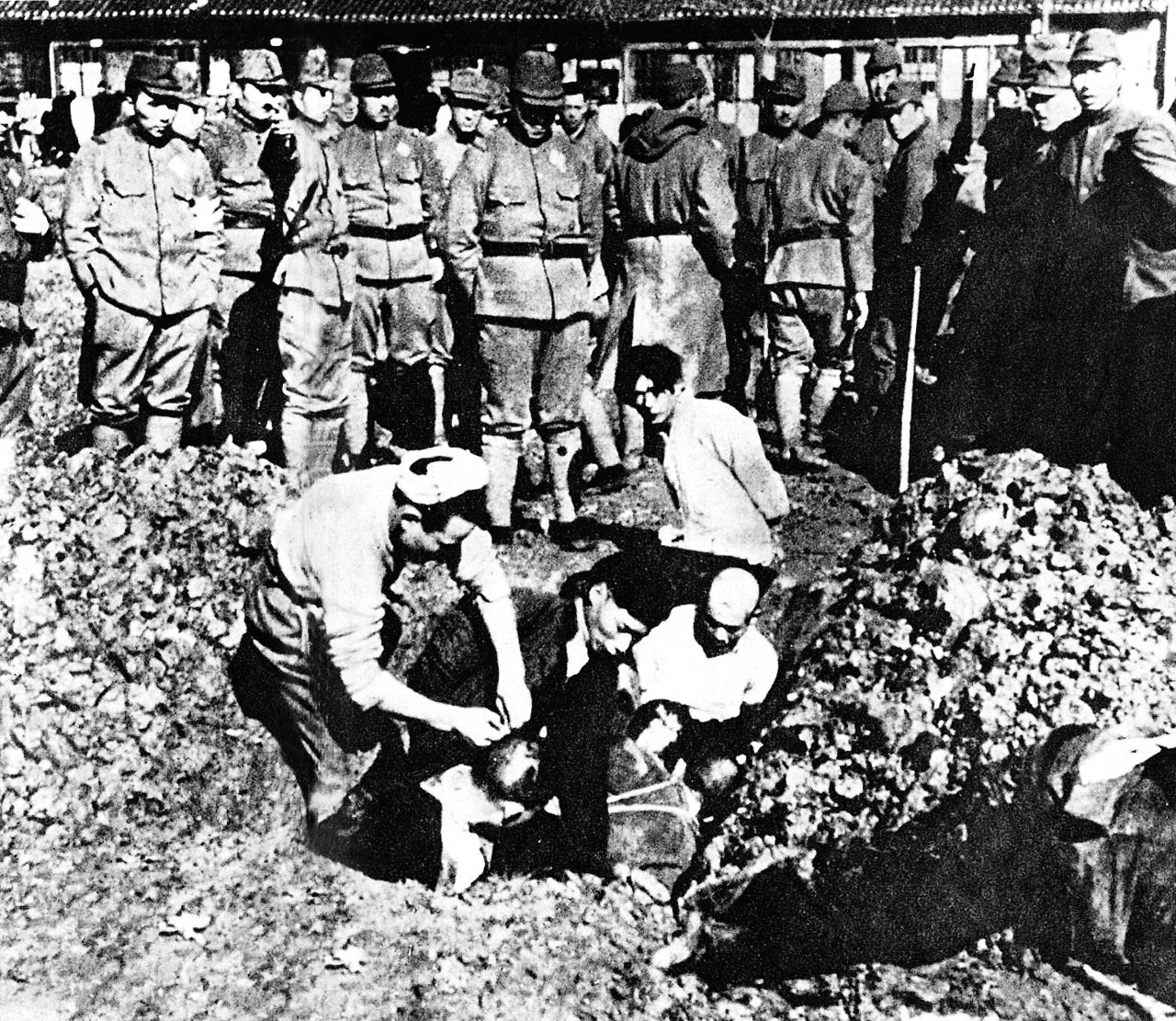
Chinese civilians to be killed, Sino-Japanese War

During the Second Sino-Japanese War, the Imperial Japanese Army had a scorched-earth policy, known as "Three Alls Policy", which caused immense environmental and infrastructure damage to be recorded. It contributed to the complete destruction of entire villages and partial destruction of entire cities.

The Chinese National Revolutionary Army destroyed dams and levees in an attempt to flood the land to slow down the advancement of Japanese soldiers, which further added to the environmental impact and resulted in the 1938 Yellow River flood. In the 1938 Changsha fire, the city of Changsha was put on fire by the Kuomintang to prevent any wealth from falling into enemy hands.

==== World War II ====
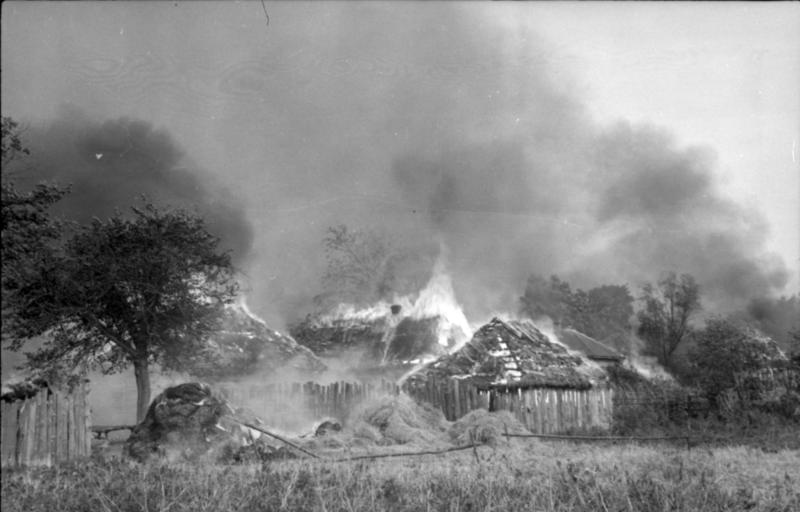
Nazi Germany's scorched-earth policy in the Soviet Union in 1943. In this photograph, taken by a Wehrmacht propaganda company, the original 1943 caption reads, "Russia. Burning houses / huts in village".

At the start of the Winter War in 1939, the Finns used the tactic in the vicinity of the border in order to deprive the invading Soviet Red Army's provisions and shelter for the forthcoming cold winter. In some cases, fighting took place in areas that were familiar to the Finnish soldiers who were fighting it. There were accounts of soldiers burning down their very own homes and parishes. One of the burned parishes was Suomussalmi.

When Germany attacked the Soviet Union in June 1941, many district governments took the initiative to begin a partial scorched-earth policy to deny the invaders access to electrical, telecommunications, rail, and industrial resources. Parts of the telegraph network were destroyed, some rail and road bridges were blown up, most electrical generators were sabotaged through the removal of key components, and many mineshafts were collapsed.

The process was repeated later in the war by the German forces of Army Group North and Erich von Manstein's Army Group Don, which stole crops, destroyed farms, and razed cities and smaller settlements during several military operations. The rationale for the policy was that it would slow pursuing Soviet forces by forcing them to save their own civilians. The best-known victims of the German scorched-earth policy were the people of the historic city of Novgorod, which was razed during the winter of 1944 to cover Army Group North's retreat from Leningrad.

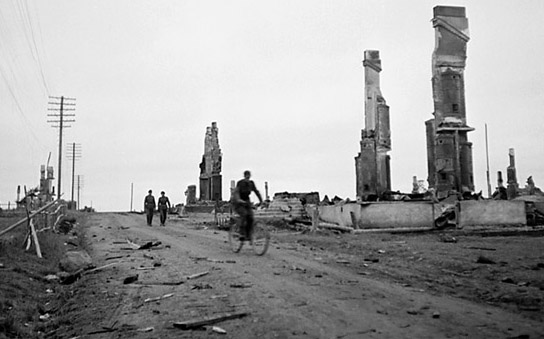
Finnish troops arrive in the church village of Sodankylä, burned by the Germans, in 1945.

Near the end of the summer of 1944, Finland, which had made a separate peace with the Allies, was required to evict the German forces, which had been fighting against the Soviets alongside Finnish troops in northern Finland. The Finnish forces, under the leadership of General Hjalmar Siilasvuo, struck aggressively in late September 1944 by making a landfall at Tornio. That accelerated the German retreat, and by November 1944, the Germans had left most of northern Finland. The German forces, forced to retreat because of an overall strategic situation, covered their retreat towards Norway by devastating large areas of northern Finland by using a scorched-earth strategy. More than a third of the area's dwellings were destroyed, and the provincial capital Rovaniemi was burned to the ground. All but two bridges in Lapland Province were blown up, and all roads were mined.

In northern Norway, which was also being invaded by Soviet forces in pursuit of the retreating Wehrmacht in 1944, the Germans also undertook a scorched-earth policy of destroying every building that could offer shelter and thus interposing a belt of "scorched earth" between themselves and the allies.

In 1945, Adolf Hitler ordered his minister of armaments, Albert Speer, to carry out a nationwide scorched-earth policy, in what became known as the Nero Decree. Speer, who was looking to the future, actively resisted the order, just as he had earlier refused Hitler's command to destroy French industry when the Wehrmacht was being driven out of France. Speer managed to continue doing so even after Hitler became aware of his actions.

During the Second World War, the railroad plough was used during retreats in Germany, Czechoslovakia and other countries to deny enemy use of railways by partially destroying them.

==== Malayan Liberation War ====
Britain was the first nation to employ herbicides and defoliants (chiefly Agent Orange) to destroy the crops and the bushes of Malayan National Liberation Army (MNLA) insurgents in Malaya during the Malayan Emergency. The intent was to prevent MNLA insurgents from utilizing rice fields to resupply their rations and using them as a cover to ambush passing convoys of Commonwealth troops.

==== Goa War ====
In response to India's invasion of Portuguese Goa in December 1961 during the annexation of Portuguese India, orders delivered from Portuguese President Américo Tomás called for a scorched-earth policy for Goa to be destroyed before its surrender to India.

However, despite his orders from Lisbon, Governor General Manuel António Vassalo e Silva took stock of the superiority of the Indian troops and of his forces' supplies of food and ammunition and took the decision to surrender. He later described his orders to destroy Goa as "a useless sacrifice" (um sacrifício inútil)".

==== Vietnam War ====
The United States used Agent Orange as a part of its herbicidal warfare program Operation Ranch Hand to destroy crops and foliage to expose possible enemy hideouts during the Vietnam War. Agent Blue was used on rice fields to deny food to the Viet Cong.

==== Guatemalan Civil War ====
Efraín Ríos Montt used the policy in Guatemala's highlands in 1981 and 1982, but it had been used under the previous president, Fernando Romeo Lucas García. Upon entering office, Ríos Montt implemented a new counterinsurgency strategy that called for the use of scorched earth to combat the Guatemalan National Revolutionary Unity rebels. Plan Victoria 82 was more commonly known by the nickname of the rural pacification elements of the strategy, Fusiles y Frijoles (Bullets and Beans). Ríos Montt's policies resulted in the death of thousands, most of them indigenous Mayans.

==== Indonesia ====
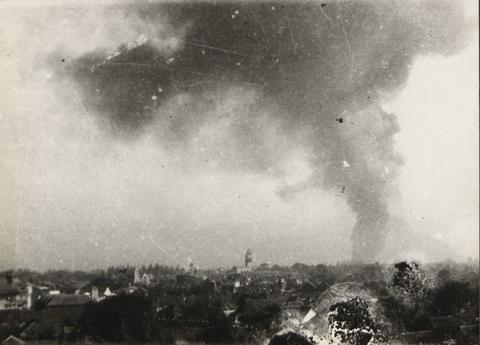
Southern part of Bandung during Bandung Sea of Fire, 23 March 1946

The Indonesian military used the method during the Indonesian National Revolution when the British forces in Bandung gave an ultimatum for local fighters to leave the city. In response, the southern part of Bandung was deliberately burned down in an act of defiance as they left it on 24 March 1946. This event is known as the Bandung Sea of Fire (Bandung Lautan Api).

The Indonesian military and pro-Indonesia militias also used the method in the 1999 East Timorese crisis. The Timor-Leste scorched-earth campaign was around the time of East Timor's referendum for independence in 1999.

==== Yugoslav Wars ====
The method was used during the Yugoslav Wars that started in 1991, such as against the Serbs in Krajina by the Croatian Army, and by Serbian paramilitary groups.

==== Soviet–Afghan War ====
The Soviet army used scorched-earth tactics against towns and villages in 1983 to 1984 in the Soviet–Afghan War to prevent the return of the Mujahideen by a migratory genocide. The Soviet army used mines extensively in the bordering provinces to Pakistan to cut off weapon supply.

==== Chechen Wars ====
During both the First (1994–1996) and Second Chechen Wars (1999–2009), Russian federal forces utilized a variation of scorched-earth tactics to counter Chechen guerrilla warfare. Rather than a defensive retreat, the strategy was used offensively as a method of area denial and infrastructure destruction. During the 1999–2000 Battle of Grozny, heavy and indiscriminate use of artillery and airstrikes systematically leveled the capital city, leading a 2003 United Nations report to call Grozny the "most destroyed city on Earth." Foreign policy analysts and bodies such as the Commission on Security and Cooperation in Europe explicitly characterized the Kremlin's actions as a "scorched-earth policy" aimed at the civilian population. In the mountainous southern regions of Chechnya, Russian forces also engaged in tactics aimed at destroying local infrastructure, clearing forests to eliminate physical cover for insurgents, and implementing blockades (Zachistka) on villages suspected of aiding rebel forces.

=== 21st century ===
==== Sri Lankan Civil War ====
During the 2009 Sri Lankan Civil War, the United Nations Regional Information Centre accused the government of Sri Lanka of using scorched-earth tactics.

==== Operation Scorched Earth ====
In 2009, Yemen launched Operation Scorched Earth to end the Houthi insurgency. The military was given orders to destroy all civilian and military infrastructure that could be used by the Houthis in violation of the Geneva Convention of warfare.

==== Myanmar civil war ====
In March 2023, the Office of the United Nations High Commissioner for Human Rights condemned the Burmese military's use of a scorched earth strategy, which has killed thousands of civilians, displaced 1.3 million people and destroyed 39,000 houses throughout the country since the 2021 Myanmar coup d'état, as the military has denied humanitarian access to survivors, razed entire villages, and used indiscriminate airstrikes and artillery shelling.

==== Gaza war ====
The Dahiya doctrine, an Israeli military strategy, involves the destruction of civilian infrastructure to pressure hostile governments. Initially applied during the 2006 Lebanon War, it targeted the Dahieh district in Beirut. This strategy was similarly employed during Israel's 2023 military operations in Gaza following the October 7 attacks. Satellite images from the first five months of the conflict revealed widespread destruction across Gaza.

As of January 2024, the United Nations reported that 90% of Gaza's educational facilities had been significantly damaged. Large areas of agricultural land were also destroyed. In December 2024, the UN reported that over 60,000 structures in Gaza had been destroyed, with more than 20,000 severely damaged. By January 2025, UN figures showed that 90% of homes in Gaza had been destroyed or damaged, with 60% of buildings overall being affected.

Critics, including international rights organizations, have accused Israel of waging a scorched earth campaign aimed at eradicating Palestinian life in Gaza. On November 4, 2023, Colonel Yogev Bar Sheshet, deputy head of Israel's Civil Administration, stated, "Whoever returns here, if they return here after, will find scorched earth. No houses, no agriculture, no nothing. They have no future." The statement was cited in South Africa's genocide case against Israel. In May 2025, Israeli Finance Minister Bezalel Smotrich stated, "Gaza will be entirely destroyed," and suggested that Palestinians would be displaced to third countries. Israel's military operations and the scale of destruction have led to ongoing investigations in international courts regarding potential war crimes.

== In business world ==
The concept of scorched-earth defense is sometimes applied figuratively to the business world in which a firm facing a takeover attempts to make itself less valuable by selling off its assets.

== See also ==
- Area bombing
  - Aerial bombing of cities
- Area denial
- Bellum se ipsum alet, the strategy of relying on occupied territories for resources
- Burmah Oil Co. v Lord Advocate
- Carthaginian peace
- Chevauchée
- Countervalue
- Early thermal weapons
- Ecocide
  - Genocide–ecocide nexus
- Environmental impact of war
- Fabian strategy
- Harrying of the North
- Lam chau (doctrine)
- Railroad plough
- Salted bomb
- Salting the earth
- Sherman's neckties
- Total war
- Well poisoning
