= South Africa's genocide case against Israel =

Ongoing case at the International Court of Justice

Application of the Convention on the Prevention and Punishment of the Crime of Genocide in the Gaza Strip (South Africa v. Israel)
- Court: International Court of Justice
- Full case name: Application of the Convention on the Prevention and Punishment of the Crime of Genocide in the Gaza Strip (South Africa v. Israel)
- Started: 29 December 2023 (2 years, 10 months, 3 weeks and 1 day); Proceedings available online
- Transcripts: Transcript of South Africa's submissions regarding provisional measures; Transcript of Israel's submissions regarding provisional measures; The court's order regarding provisional measures
- Claim: Israel has committed, and is committing, genocidal acts and genocide against Palestinians in the Gaza Strip in violation of the Genocide Convention

Court membership
- President: Joan Donoghue (President); Kirill Gevorgian (Vice-president)
- Associate judges: Peter Tomka; Ronny Abraham; Mohamed Bennouna; Abdulqawi Yusuf; Xue Hanqin; Dalveer Bhandari; Patrick Lipton Robinson; Nawaf Salam; Yuji Iwasawa; Georg Nolte; Leonardo Nemer Caldeira Brant; Julia Sebutinde; Hilary Charlesworth; Aharon Barak (ad hoc); Dikgang Moseneke (ad hoc)

Keywords
- Israeli–Palestinian conflict; military occupation; public international law

The Application of the Convention on the Prevention and Punishment of the Crime of Genocide in the Gaza Strip (South Africa v. Israel) is an ongoing case that was brought before the International Court of Justice on 29 December 2023 by South Africa regarding Israel's conduct in the Gaza Strip during the Gaza war, that resulted in a humanitarian crisis and mass killings.

South Africa alleged that Israel had committed and was committing genocide in Gaza, contravening the Genocide Convention, including what South Africa described as Israel's 75-year apartheid, 56-year occupation, and 16-year blockade of the Strip. South Africa requested that the ICJ indicate provisional measures of protection, including the immediate suspension of Israel's operations. Israel characterized South Africa's charges as "baseless", accusing the country of "functioning as the legal arm" of Hamas. Israel said that it was conducting a war of self-defense in accordance with international law following the Hamas-led attack on its territory on 7 October 2023.

Two days of public hearings were held on 11 and 12 January 2024 at the Peace Palace in The Hague. The court ruled that it is plausible that Israel's acts could infringe rights of the Palestinian people protected by the Genocide Convention and issued provisional measures, in which it ordered Israel to take all measures to prevent any acts contrary to the 1948 Genocide Convention, but did not order Israel to suspend its military campaign. The court also expressed concern about the fate of the hostages held in the Gaza Strip and recognized the catastrophic situation in Gaza. In late February, Human Rights Watch and Amnesty International asserted that Israel had failed to comply with the ICJ's provisional measures and that obstructing the entry and distribution of aid amounted to war crimes.

On 28 March 2024, following a second request for additional measures, the ICJ ordered new emergency measures, ordering Israel to ensure basic food supplies, without delay, as Gazans face famine and starvation. On 24 May, by a vote of 13‍–‍2, the court issued what some experts considered to be an ambiguous order but which was widely understood as requiring Israel to immediately halt its offensive in Rafah. Israel rejected this interpretation and continued with its offensive operations. In April 2024, the ICJ requested comprehensive legal opinions from both countries. South Africa submitted its memorial in October 2024, while Israel submitted its opinion in March 2026 after two delays.

== Background ==
In 1948, the United Nations General Assembly unanimously adopted the Convention on the Prevention and Punishment of the Crime of Genocide, which defined genocide as any of five "acts committed with intent to destroy, in whole or in part, a national, ethnical, racial or religious group". The acts were: killing members of the protected group, causing them serious bodily or mental harm, imposing living conditions intended to destroy the group, preventing births, and forcibly transferring children out of the protected group. Victims must be targeted because of their real or perceived membership of a protected national, ethnic, racial or religious group.

Both Israel and South Africa have signed and ratified the Genocide Convention without reservation.

== Proceedings ==
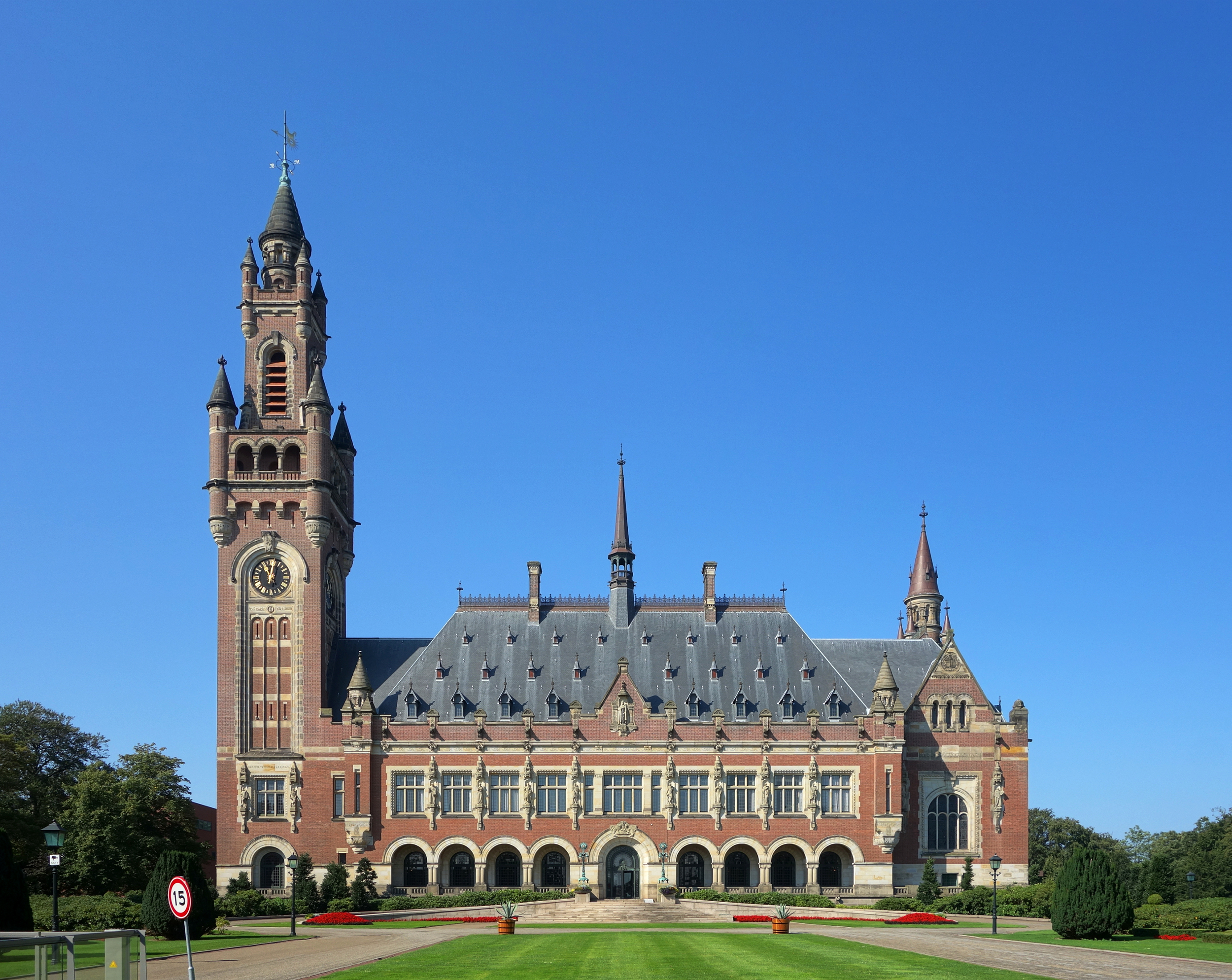
Public hearings will be held at the Peace Palace in The Hague.

Proceedings were instituted on 29 December 2023 at the International Court of Justice pursuant to the Genocide Convention, and brought pursuant to Article IX of the convention.

Balkees Jarrah, associate international justice director at Human Rights Watch, notes that the ICJ case is not a prosecution of individuals, and does not directly involve the International Criminal Court, which is a separate body that is currently carrying out its own investigation. Jarrah stated that the case presents an opportunity to "provide clear, definitive answers on the question of whether Israel is committing genocide against the Palestinian people".

According to legal academics, South Africa's request for provisional measures against Israel does not require a determination of whether Israel actually perpetrated genocide, but instead requires the determination that it is "plausible" that Palestinian rights under the convention were violated. Recent rulings in regard to the granting of provisional measures have taken between two weeks and one month after hearings. A final judgement on the case could take years.

Separately, hearings begin in February 2024 in regard to a U.N. request for a non-binding advisory opinion on the legal consequences arising from the policies and practices of Israel in the occupied Palestinian territory including East Jerusalem.

On 24 January 2024, the Court announced that it would rule on the provisional measures request on 26 January 2024.

On 12 February 2024, South Africa requested that the court consider whether a planned Israeli military offensive against Rafah "has already led to and will result in further large-scale killing, harm and destruction", in breach both of the Genocide Convention and of the Court's Order of 26 January."

=== South African government position ===
South Africa accuses Israel of committing acts of genocide in the Gaza Strip in violation of the 1948 Genocide Convention, which defined and prohibited genocide. South Africa brought the case by invoking its "obligation to prevent genocide" as a signatory to the United Nations Genocide Convention. The South African legal team includes John Dugard, Adila Hassim, Tembeka Ngcukaitobi, Max du Plessis, Tshidiso Ramogale, Sarah Pudifin-Jones, Lerato Zikalala, Vaughan Lowe and Blinne Ní Ghrálaigh. South Africa has also appointed former Deputy Chief Justice Dikgang Moseneke as an ad hoc judge. During his period of imprisonment on Robben Island, Moseneke had met and befriended fellow anti-apartheid activist and future President Nelson Mandela, who went on to become a supporter of the Palestinian cause himself. A number of international political figures will be joining the South African delegation, including Jeremy Corbyn and Jean-Luc Mélenchon.

In the country's 84-page application it alleged that Israel's actions "are genocidal in character because they are intended to bring about the destruction of a substantial part of the Palestinian national, racial and ethnical group". South Africa requested that the ICJ issue a binding legal order on an interim basis (i.e., prior to a hearing on the merits of the application), requiring Israel to "immediately suspend its military operations in and against Gaza." Additionally, the incumbent South African president Cyril Ramaphosa also compared Israel's actions to apartheid.

The submission asserts that "acts and omissions by Israel ... are genocidal in character, as they are committed with the requisite specific intent ... to destroy Palestinians in Gaza as a part of the broader Palestinian national, racial and ethnical group". Genocidal actions alleged in the suit included the mass killing of Palestinians in Gaza, the destruction of their homes, their expulsion and displacement, as well as the blockade on food, water and medical aid to the region. South Africa alleged that Israel had imposed measures preventing Palestinian births through the destruction of essential health services vital for the survival of pregnant women and their babies. The suit argued that these actions were "intended to bring about their [Palestinians] destruction as a group".

In an effort to establish genocidal intent behind the actions, a very difficult task, South Africa cited statements by Israeli leaders, such as Prime Minister Benjamin Netanyahu's invocations to "Remember what Amalek has done to you," referencing the total destruction of Amalek by the Israelites in the Bible, President Isaac Herzog's statement "It's an entire nation out there that is responsible. It's not true this rhetoric about civilians not aware not involved. It's absolutely not true. ... and we will fight until we break their backbone," and Minister of Defense Yoav Gallant's 'situation update' advising Israel is "imposing a complete siege on Gaza. No electricity, no food, no water, no fuel. Everything is closed. We are fighting human animals and are acting accordingly." and military officials and representatives, (Note: Incl. Major General Ghassan Alian's video statement on COGAT's official YouTube channel that "Hamas became ISIS and the citizens of Gaza are celebrating instead of being horrified. Human animals are dealt with accordingly. Israel has imposed a total blockade on Gaza, no electricity, no water, just damage. You wanted hell, you will get hell," and the statement of Yair Ben David, Commander in the 2908th Battalion of the IDF, that the battalion "entered Beit Hanoun and did there as Shimon and Levi did in Nablus," referencing the killing of all males in the city in the Bible, and "the entire Gaza should resemble Bei Hanoun.") asserting that these "indicate in and of themselves a clear intent to destroy Palestinians in Gaza as a group 'as such'". The submission further asserts that these statements constitute direct and public incitement to genocide which has gone "unchecked and unpunished" and is instead being implemented; on this, the submission cites Israeli soldiers on the ground. (Note: Incl. a television broadcast filmed in Beit Lahia, where Colonel Yogev Bar Sheshet, deputy head of COGAT, stated "Whoever returns here, if they return here after, will find scorched earth. No houses, no agriculture, no nothing. They have no future," and Colonel Erez Eshel (Reserve) commented "Vengeance is a great value. There is vengeance over what they did to us ... This place will be a fallow land. They will not be able to live here," and a video on Twitter where uniformed Israeli soldiers dance, sing, and chant "we know our motto: there are no uninvolved civilians" and "to wipe off the seed of Amalek.") In October 2024, the South African team submitted hundreds of pages of evidence which it stated proved Israel's intent to commit genocide.

==== Requested provisional measures of protection ====
The South African application set out nine provisional measures of protection requested:

| Number | Summary | Full description |
|---|---|---|
| 1 | Suspension of military operations | The State of Israel shall immediately suspend its military operations in and against Gaza. |
| 2 | Suspension of military operations | The State of Israel shall ensure that any military or irregular armed units which may be directed, supported or influenced by it, as well as any organisations and persons which may be subject to its control, direction or influence, take no steps in furtherance of the military operations referred to point (1) above. |
| 3 | Prevent genocide | The Republic of South Africa and the State of Israel shall each, in accordance with their obligations under the Convention on the Prevention and Punishment of the Crime of Genocide, in relation to the Palestinian people, take all reasonable measures within their power to prevent genocide. |
| 4 | Desist from killing, injuring, destroying life and preventing births | The State of Israel shall, in accordance with its obligations under the Convention on the Prevention and Punishment of the Crime of Genocide, in relation to the Palestinian people as a group protected by the Convention on the Prevention and Punishment of the Crime of Genocide, desist from the commission of any and all acts within the scope of Article II of the convention, in particular: 1. killing members of the group; 2. causing serious bodily or mental harm to the members of the group; 3. deliberately inflicting on the group conditions of life calculated to bring about its physical destruction in whole or in part; and 4. imposing measures intended to prevent births within the group. |
| 5 | Prevent displacement, deprivation and the destruction of life | The State of Israel shall, pursuant to point (4) (c) above, in relation to Palestinians, desist from, and take all measures within its power including the rescinding of relevant orders, of restrictions and/or of prohibitions to prevent: 1. the expulsion and forced displacement from their homes; 2. the deprivation of: 1. access to adequate food and water; 2. access to humanitarian assistance, including access to adequate fuel, shelter, clothes, hygiene and sanitation; 3. medical supplies and assistance; and 3. the destruction of Palestinian life in Gaza. |
| 6 | Desist from incitement, and punish acts of and encouragement to genocide | The State of Israel shall, in relation to Palestinians, ensure that its military, as well as any irregular armed units or individuals which may be directed, supported or otherwise influenced by it and any organizations and persons which may be subject to its control, direction or influence, do not commit any acts described in (4) and (5) above, or engage in direct and public incitement to commit genocide, conspiracy to commit genocide, attempt to commit genocide, or complicity in genocide, and insofar as they do engage therein, that steps are taken towards their punishment pursuant to Articles I, II, III and IV of the Convention on the Prevention and Punishment of the Crime of Genocide. |
| 7 | Prevent the destruction of and ensure the preservation of evidence | The State of Israel shall take effective measures to prevent the destruction and ensure the preservation of evidence related to allegations of acts within the scope of Article II of the Convention on the Prevention and Punishment of the Crime of Genocide; to that end, the State of Israel shall not act to deny or otherwise restrict access by fact-finding missions, international mandates and other bodies to Gaza to assist in ensuring the preservation and retention of said evidence. |
| 8 | Submit ongoing reports to the Court on measures taken | The State of Israel shall submit a report to the Court on all measures taken to give effect to this Order within one week, as from the date of this Order, and thereafter at such regular intervals as the Court shall order, until a final decision on the case is rendered by the Court. |
| 9 | Refrain from aggravating the situation | The State of Israel shall refrain from any action and shall ensure that no action is taken which might aggravate or extend the dispute before the Court or make it more difficult to resolve. |

=== Israeli government position ===
After the filing of the charges on 29 December, the Israeli Foreign Ministry rejected the allegations "with disgust", stating that Israel operates according to international law and focuses its military actions solely against Hamas, and that the residents of Gaza are not the enemy. It asserted that it takes steps to minimize harm to civilians and to allow humanitarian aid to enter the territory and accused South Africa of "cooperating with a terrorist organisation that is calling for the destruction of the State of Israel" and the actions of South Africa as a blood libel. An Israeli government spokesperson later asserted that "History will judge South Africa for abetting the modern heirs of the Nazis".

On 2 January 2024, the Israeli government decided to participate in the ICJ proceedings, despite having previously refused to participate in previous international tribunals.

The Foreign Ministry conveyed through diplomatic channels that a ruling against Israel "could have significant potential implications not only in the legal realm but also in practical, bilateral, economic, and security-related aspects." The ministry characterized the South African charges as "baseless" and further described South Africa as "functioning as the legal arm" of Hamas.

The government appointed former President of the Supreme Court of Israel, Aharon Barak as an ad hoc judge to sit on the ICJ, as permitted by the court's statutes. Barak's appointment was supported by the majority of the Israeli public in opinion polls, due to his status as an internationally respected legal authority, but was criticised by several far-right Israeli politicians, including Ministers Bezalel Smotrich and Amihai Ben-Eliyahu. In July 2024, following Barak's resignation for personal reasons, Israel announced the appointment of the conservative Israeli legal scholar, Ron Shapira, to replace Barak as the ad-hoc associate judge on the ICJ.

Israeli Prime Minister Benjamin Netanyahu stated that it was Hamas that was committing genocide, and "would murder all of us if it could". Netanyahu added that the Israel Defense Forces are "acting as morally as possible". In a later statement, Netanyahu stated that "nobody" could stop Israel from continuing its actions in Gaza, including The Hague. The Israel Defense Forces stated that it takes actions to reduce civilian casualties such as warning civilians in targeted areas and not striking certain areas with civilians. The Israeli government stated multiple times that it wants to eliminate Hamas and not Palestinians.

Israel argues that it is conducting a war of self-defense in accordance with international law following the Hamas-led attacks on Israeli territory on 7 October 2023, in which some 1,200 people were killed and the continuing firing of missiles at civilian population centers and holding of hostages; that the official directives of the Israeli war cabinet and military authorities responsible for directing the war do not indicate any policy of genocidal intent, and while acknowledging the high incidence of civilian casualties, asserts that this because Hamas and other militant groups use civilian infrastructure as cover for their military assets and operations; and that it is following international law and allowing humanitarian aid into the territory.

The representatives selected to present Israel's case at the ICJ hearing on 12 January were Tal Becker, Ministry of Foreign Affairs Legal Adviser, Malcolm Shaw, British jurist and Professor of International Law, Christopher Staker, British barrister, Omri Sender, Israeli Attorney at Law and Galit Raguan and Gilad Noam, Deputy Attorney Generals for International Law in the Ministry of Justice, along with several other supporting legal counsel and advisors.

The representatives of Israel responded to South Africa's charges at the ICJ by asserting that the charges lacked both legal and factual basis:

Representatives of Israel argued that the context of the conflict, particularly the atrocities committed by Hamas on 7 October, demonstrate that if there have been acts that may be characterized as genocidal, they were perpetrated against Israel. They emphasized that Israel is committed to complying with international law and argued that Hamas showed contempt for that law by using Palestinian civilians as human shields and civilian infrastructure for military uses, firing rockets indiscriminately at Israeli civilian targets and by taking and holding hostages. They maintained that Israel makes efforts to mitigate civilian harm and address the humanitarian situation in Gaza by warnings for civilians to evacuate areas of planned attacks, permitting the entry of aid, and the establishment of field hospitals.

On legal grounds, the Israeli team argued that the court has no jurisdiction over this case, as no disputes exist between the country and South Africa. Shaw cited the exact dates of Israeli responses to the diplomatic notes it received, including proposals for meetings between South African and Israeli officials to talk about Gaza. Israel further argued that South Africa had failed to show intent, a fundamental element of genocide, about the acts which are the subject of the complaint, in order for it to fall within the provisions of the Genocide Convention and therefore asserted that the ICJ lacked jurisdiction over the Gaza war. Shaw contended that the South African case provided only a partial narrative and urged the court to consider the decisions of the Israeli cabinet instead of focusing on "random statements by politicians who are not decision-makers".

Israeli team maintained that the requested provisional measures would deprive Israel of its obligation under international law to provide defense to its citizens, to the hostages, and to over 110,000 internally displaced Israelis; it would also encourage further attacks.

=== Initial ruling on plausibility ===
In its initial ruling on 26 January 2024, the court accepted the plausibility of "at least some of the rights claimed by South Africa" under the Genocide Convention, and found it has prima facie jurisdiction to adjudicate the dispute. The Court did not specify which rights, and clarified that this was not a ruling on whether Israel was in breach of the convention. According to Joan Donoghue, the President of the court during the initial hearing, this did not mean that the court had found that Israel was plausibly committing genocide; instead the test that it was considering was whether the "rights that are asserted by the applicant, in this case South Africa" are plausible. She said the court decided that these asserted rights were plausible; that Palestinians had a plausible right to be protected from genocide and that South Africa had the right to present that claim in the court.

The standard for a provisional finding of plausibility is low, and much lower than the standard for establishing a violation occurred, which would be determined at the conclusion of the case. According to Todd F. Buchwald there is a "gap between plausibility and the much higher level of certainty that the Applicant will eventually need to satisfy in order to establish that the Respondent has violated its obligation".

The court stated, in paragraphs 30 and 54 of the ruling, as follows:

30. ... In the Court's view, at least some of the acts and omissions alleged by South Africa to have been committed by Israel in Gaza appear to be capable of falling within the provisions of the Convention.

54. In the Court's view, the facts and circumstances mentioned above are sufficient to conclude that at least some of the rights claimed by South Africa and for which it is seeking protection are plausible. This is the case with respect to the right of the Palestinians in Gaza to be protected from acts of genocide and related prohibited acts identified in Article III, and the right of South Africa to seek Israel's compliance with the latter's obligations under the Convention.

=== Ruling on provisional measures ===
In its Order of 26 January 2024, while not granting South Africa's request to order Israel to suspend its military operations in Gaza, the Court ordered Israel to take measures to prevent acts of genocide in the Gaza Strip, and to report to the Court regarding by 23 February 2024; to prevent and punish incitement to genocide; to allow humanitarian aid into Gaza; and generally, to take more measures to protect Palestinians. The court ordered the following provisional measures, compared against those requested by South Africa:

| Summary | Court judgment (26 Jan 2024) | South Africa original request (29 Dec 2023) |
|---|---|---|
| Prevent genocide and desist from killing, injuring, destroying life and preventing births | (1) The State of Israel shall, in accordance with its obligations under the Convention on the Prevention and Punishment of the Crime of Genocide, in relation to Palestinians in Gaza, take all measures within its power to prevent the commission of all acts within the scope of Article II of this convention, in particular: 1. killing members of the group; 2. causing serious bodily or mental harm to members of the group; 3. deliberately inflicting on the group conditions of life calculated to bring about its physical destruction in whole or in part; and 4. imposing measures intended to prevent births within the group; (2) The State of Israel shall ensure with immediate effect that its military does not commit any acts described in point 1 above; | (3) The Republic of South Africa and the State of Israel shall each, in accordance with their obligations under the Convention on the Prevention and Punishment of the Crime of Genocide, in relation to the Palestinian people, take all reasonable measures within their power to prevent genocide. |
| Prevent genocide and desist from killing, injuring, destroying life and preventing births | | (4) The State of Israel shall, in accordance with its obligations under the Convention on the Prevention and Punishment of the Crime of Genocide, in relation to the Palestinian people as a group protected by the Convention on the Prevention and Punishment of the Crime of Genocide, desist from the commission of any and all acts within the scope of Article II of the convention, in particular: 1. killing members of the group; 2. causing serious bodily or mental harm to the members of the group; 3. deliberately inflicting on the group conditions of life calculated to bring about its physical destruction in whole or in part; and 4. imposing measures intended to prevent births within the group. |
| Desist from incitement, and punish acts of and encouragement to genocide | (3) The State of Israel shall take all measures within its power to prevent and punish the direct and public incitement to commit genocide in relation to members of the Palestinian group in the Gaza Strip; | (6) The State of Israel shall, in relation to Palestinians, ensure that its military, as well as any irregular armed units or individuals which may be directed, supported or otherwise influenced by it and any organizations and persons which may be subject to its control, direction or influence, do not commit any acts described in (4) and (5) above, or engage in direct and public incitement to commit genocide, conspiracy to commit genocide, attempt to commit genocide, or complicity in genocide, and insofar as they do engage therein, that steps are taken towards their punishment pursuant to Articles I, II, III and IV of the Convention on the Prevention and Punishment of the Crime of Genocide. |
| Enable the provision of basic services and humanitarian assistance | (4) The State of Israel shall take immediate and effective measures to enable the provision of urgently needed basic services and humanitarian assistance to address the adverse conditions of life faced by Palestinians in the Gaza Strip; | (5) The State of Israel shall, pursuant to point (4) (c) above, in relation to Palestinians, desist from, and take all measures within its power including the rescinding of relevant orders, of restrictions and/or of prohibitions to prevent: 1. the expulsion and forced displacement from their homes; 2. the deprivation of: 1. access to adequate food and water; 2. access to humanitarian assistance, including access to adequate fuel, shelter, clothes, hygiene and sanitation; 3. medical supplies and assistance; and 3. the destruction of Palestinian life in Gaza. |
| Prevent the destruction of and ensure the preservation of evidence | (5) The State of Israel shall take effective measures to prevent the destruction and ensure the preservation of evidence related to allegations of acts within the scope of Article II and Article III of the Convention on the Prevention and Punishment of the Crime of Genocide against members of the Palestinian group in the Gaza Strip; | (7) The State of Israel shall take effective measures to prevent the destruction and ensure the preservation of evidence related to allegations of acts within the scope of Article II of the Convention on the Prevention and Punishment of the Crime of Genocide; to that end, the State of Israel shall not act to deny or otherwise restrict access by fact-finding missions, international mandates and other bodies to Gaza to assist in ensuring the preservation and retention of said evidence. |
| Submit ongoing reports to the Court on measures taken | (6) The State of Israel shall submit a report to the Court on all measures taken to give effect to this Order within one month as from the date of this Order. | (8) The State of Israel shall submit a report to the Court on all measures taken to give effect to this Order within one week, as from the date of this Order, and thereafter at such regular intervals as the Court shall order, until a final decision on the case is rendered by the Court. |
| Suspension of military operations | n.a. | (1) The State of Israel shall immediately suspend its military operations in and against Gaza. |
| Suspension of military operations | n.a. | (2) The State of Israel shall ensure that any military or irregular armed units which may be directed, supported or influenced by it, as well as any organisations and persons which may be subject to its control, direction or influence, take no steps in furtherance of the military operations referred to point (1) above. |
| Refrain from aggravating the situation | n.a. | (9) The State of Israel shall refrain from any action and shall ensure that no action is taken which might aggravate or extend the dispute before the Court or make it more difficult to resolve. |

The votes for the six provisional measures were as follows:

1. 15 votes to 2, with Julia Sebutinde and Aharon Barak dissenting
2. 15 votes to 2, with Sebutinde and Barak dissenting
3. 16 votes to 1, with Sebutinde dissenting
4. 16 votes to 1, with Sebutinde dissenting
5. 15 votes to 2, with Sebutinde and Barak dissenting
6. 15 votes to 2, with Sebutinde and Barak dissenting

The Court also expressed "grave concern" about the fate of the hostages held in the Gaza Strip, and called for their immediate release as well as recognizing a catastrophic situation in Gaza "at serious risk of deteriorating further" prior to a final verdict.

In response to the ruling, Israeli prime minister Benjamin Netanyahu said "The charge of genocide leveled against Israel is not only false, it's outrageous, and decent people everywhere should reject it ... Israel will continue to defend itself against Hamas, a genocidal terror organization". He further affirmed Israel's "unwavering commitment" to international law.

Riyad al-Maliki, Foreign Affairs Minister of the State of Palestine, said that the Court "ruled in favour of humanity and international law".

South Africa, a longstanding advocate for the Palestinian cause, praised the ruling. President Cyril Ramaphosa expressed his anticipation that Israel would comply with the ruling.

The Court's provisional ruling produced six sets of reasons: the Order of the Court, a dissent by Judge Julia Sebutinde, a separate opinion by Judge ad hoc Aharon Barak, and declarations by Judges Xue Hanqin, Dalveer Bhandari, and Georg Nolte.

=== Urgent request for additional measures ===
==== First request ====
On 12 February 2024, ahead of a planned Israeli military ground invasion of Rafah, South Africa submitted an "urgent request for additional measures under Article 75 (1)" due to the "developing circumstances in Rafah". South Africa requested the court to consider exercising its authority, as it argued a Rafah offensive would be in violation of both the Genocide Convention and the court's January interim order.

In its response on 15 February, Israel described South Africa's claims of an "unprecedented military operation" in Rafah on 11 February to rescue two Israeli hostages, which Hamas claimed had killed dozens of Palestinians, as an "outrageous distortion," and asserted that Hamas was demonstrating "contempt for the law" by failing to comply with the ICJ's call for the immediate and unconditional release of all remaining hostages. It characterized the South African submission as "evidence of a renewed and cynical effort by South Africa to use provisional measures as a sword, rather than a shield, and to manipulate the Court to protect South Africa's longtime ally Hamas, a genocidal terrorist organization, from Israel's inherent right and obligation to defend itself, in accordance with the law, from the terrorist assault it faces and to pursue the release of over 130 hostages."

On 16 February, the Court rejected South Africa's request, stating that the provisional measures that it had issued in January were applicable throughout the Gaza Strip, including in Rafah, and did not demand the indication of additional provisional measures, while also stressing that Israel must respect those earlier measures. After the ICJ declined to grant the emergency application, Kenneth Roth, the former director of Human Rights Watch and a professor at Princeton University, stated, "What the court just did though, it said, 'We already ordered all this to stop. Rather than repeating ourselves, it's up to the governments of the world, the UN Security Council, and foremost the US government, to stop this killing'".

==== Second request ====
On 6 March, South Africa filed a second request for additional measures, requesting the court to order additional emergency measures to require that Israel provide humanitarian assistance to address starvation and famine in Gaza. In its statement, South Africa argued, "The situation is urgent. South Africa has no choice but to approach the Court for the strengthening of the Provisional Measures in place to try prevent full-scale famine, starvation and disease in the Gaza Strip". Israel's legal team described South Africa's request as "wholly unfounded in fact and law, morally repugnant, and represent an abuse both of the Genocide Convention and of the court itself".

On 28 March 2024, the court adopted the emergency measures. The court's judges said "The court observes that Palestinians in Gaza are no longer facing only a risk of famine (...) but that famine is setting in", unanimously ordering Israel to take action to ensure food supplies to the Palestinian population without delay.

==== Third request ====
On 10 May 2024, South Africa requested additional provisional measures that would protect the population of Rafah in the face of Israeli attack in that area. South Africa's arguments for these provisional measures were presented orally on 16 May, and Israel's arguments were presented the following day.

Before closing the hearing on 17 May, the ICJ requested Israel provide more information about humanitarian conditions in its declared "evacuation zones" in Gaza. Judge Georg Nolte asked Israel to clarify the conditions in these zones, including how it plans to ensure the safe passage of evacuees and the provision of essential supplies such as food and shelter. Israel has been asked to submit a written reply to the question by 18 May at 4 pm.

On 24 May 2024, the court ordered a halt to Israel's Rafah offensive. The order was considered by some experts to be ambiguous, particularly regarding whether it outright prohibited or merely limited offensive operations in Rafah. Judge Nawaf Salam said the court sees the situation in Rafah as "disastrous" and "Israel must immediately halt its military offensive and any other action in Rafah which may inflict on the Palestinian group in Gaza conditions of life that could bring about its physical destruction in whole or in part". Israel denounced the ICJ and said its assault on Rafah can continue under the ruling because it does not pose an unlawful threat to civilians.

Some judges argued that some military operations in Rafah were still permitted under the order. Of the five judges which published statements, four allowed for some limited military operations, with the Israeli, German, Ugandan and Romanian Judges arguing that the ruling does not mandate a unilateral ceasefire in Rafah, and allows for preventative and defensive actions against Hamas as well as the rescue of hostages. The South African judge disagreed, stating that while defensive actions against specific attacks are permitted, any offensive ones would not be.

=== Israel report to the court ===
As ordered by the court, Israel on 26 February 2024, filed a report about measures taken to comply with the interim ruling, which was not released to the press or the public.

Human Rights Watch said that Israel had not complied with at least one provisional measure, stating fewer humanitarian aid trucks entered Gaza after the ruling than in the weeks preceding it. Amnesty International similarly said Israel had not complied with the ICJ ruling to ensure sufficient aid to Palestinians in Gaza. The United Nations Special Rapporteur on the Right to Food, Michael Fakhri, described what was occurring in Gaza as "a situation of genocide". Oxfam stated, "The risk of genocide is increasing in northern Gaza because the Government of Israel is ignoring one of the key provisions of the International Court of Justice, to provide urgently needed basic services and humanitarian assistance". Doctors Without Borders stated, "There are no signs of Israeli forces attempting to limit the loss of civilian life or alleviate the suffering of people."

=== Further submissions by South Africa and Israel ===
On 5 April 2024, the court set the schedule for comprehensive submissions of legal opinions by South Africa and Israel. The time limit for the South African memorial was set to be 28 October 2024, and for the Israeli response 28 July 2025. South Africa filed its memorial on 28 October 2024. In accordance with the ICJ's rules, the memorial is not public. It contains over 750 pages of text and over 4,000 pages of exhibits and annexes. On 14 April 2025, the ICJ extended the deadline for Israel's response to 12 January 2026. On 20 October 2025, the ICJ granted another extension to Israel and changed the deadline for Israel's response to 12 March 2026. Israel was expected to submit its counter-memorial on 13 March 2026. On 14 March 2026, the Israeli foreign ministry announced on X that it had submitted its counter-memorial to the ICJ. On 15 March 2026, the presidency of South Africa stated that Israel had filed its counter-memorial on 12 March 2026. South Africa then requested more time to respond to Israel, and in an order dated 21 May 2026, the court granted them an extension until 22 November 2027, simultaneously setting a deadline 22 May 2029 for Israel's rejoinder.

== Analysis ==
=== Prior to preliminary ruling ===
==== Procedural matters ====
Lawfare, a website affiliated with the Brookings Institution, likened South Africa's application to proceedings instituted by The Gambia against Myanmar in relation to the Rohingya genocide. Writing in Just Security, an online forum based at the Reiss Center on Law and Security, Alaa Hachem and Professor Oona A. Hathaway note South Africa's invocation of erga omnes partes, a doctrine of legal standing which "allows a State party to a treaty protecting common legal rights to enforce those rights even if the State is not directly affected by the violation". Hachem and Hathaway state that the Rohingya genocide case (specifically, the acceptance of jurisdiction by the ICJ), "revolutionized" the doctrine of erga omnes. They concluded that it was "highly likely" the Court would find that South Africa has standing to institute the proceedings.

Marc Weller, Professor of International Law and International Constitutional Studies at Cambridge University, argues that "Israel cannot avoid scrutiny of its use of force and associated practices, and possible interim measures of protection, simply by invoking self-defence." While stating that Israel suffered what he describes as an "atrocious attack" that would likely inform the Court's analysis of its self-defence claim, he concludes that the claim of self-defence does not bar the issuance of provisional measures of protection.

==== Analysis of the merits ====
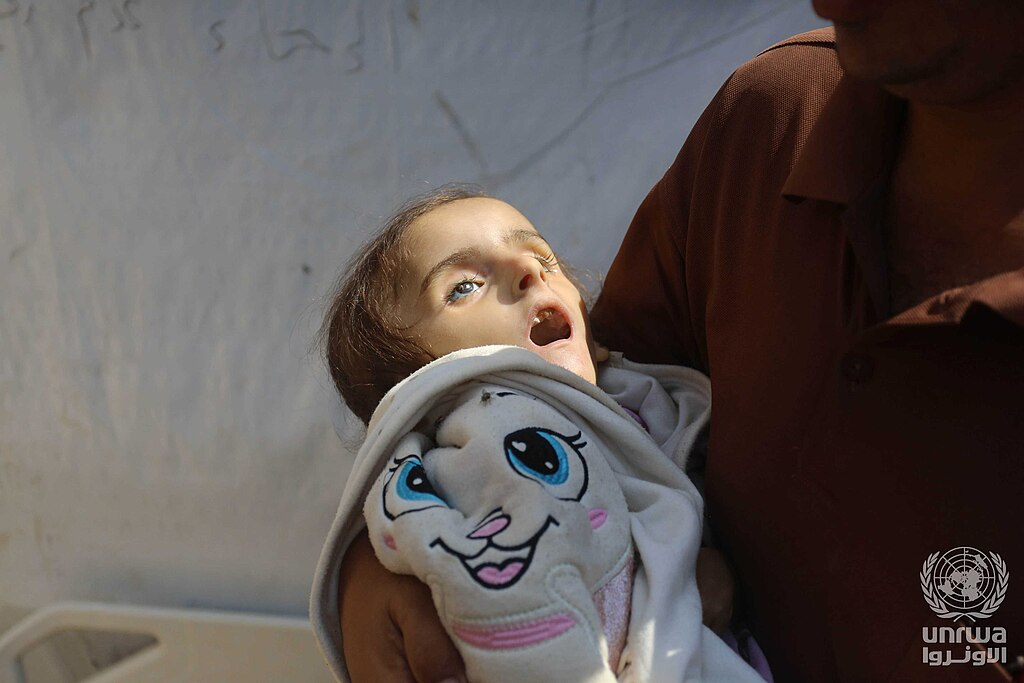
Four year old Palestinian girl who starved to death, 14 August 2024

This is the first case where the ICJ has imposed provisional measures aimed at protecting people from genocide. "The severity of risk escalates to the point where the Court decides the only means to protect these rights is to require immediate cessation of hostilities."

David Scheffer, who served as the first United States Ambassador-at-Large for War Crimes Issues, criticized South Africa's case for what he called a "complete lack of recognition... that Israel is at war," and argued that any Palestinian civilian deaths are the result of a military action against an enemy which Israel has "a justifiable right to attack in self-defense," rather than genocidal intent. Scheffer said that in a military and responsorial context of events since the 7 October attack, coupled with Israel's evacuation of Gazan civilians and its humanitarian aid efforts, would make it "clearly a line too far to try to argue that it is Israel that actually has the intent to commit genocide when Israel is responding to a genocidal act in order to prevent further genocide against Israel."

In their commentary on Just Security, Hachem and Hathaway stated that establishing genocidal intent is "extraordinarily challenging".

David Keane, a law professor focusing on the International Convention on the Elimination of All Forms of Racial Discrimination, states that the allegation in South Africa's application that Israel practices apartheid "is a remarkable statement coming from South Africa, which perhaps has been somewhat overshadowed by the overarching genocide claim." Keane notes that South Africa's application referred to the work of the Committee on the Elimination of Racial Discrimination.

In a series of posts on Verfassungsblog, University of Haifa law professor Itamar Mann stated that it "seems rather unlikely" that the Court would grant all provisional measures sought by South Africa, following oral argument in the case. He argued that the Court may impose a range of provisional measures, but would likely stop short of ordering Israel to suspend hostilities. He described South Africa's lack of reference to the ongoing armed conflict as a litigation strategy that may work against its case. He expressed concern that the provisional measures may legitimize what he described as extended or potentially "endless" war in Gaza.

An analysis, published in the Just Security forum, argues that the primary difference between South Africa and Israel position lies in competing narratives presented by both parties. The South African application followed a narrative of "...Israel commencing a massive attack on the Gaza Strip [after the events of October 7th], ...causing widespread destruction of an unprecedented nature, and severely impacting the entire population of Gaza". Israeli response followed a narrative of "...the harm and suffering experienced by Palestinian civilians were a regrettable, wholly undesirable but ultimately inevitable consequence of an intensive armed conflict taking place in an urban area...".

South Africa's allegations at the ICJ, regarding Israel's actions, have drawn criticism from some publications and individuals. The Economist, Wall Street Journal Editorial Board, former IDF international law division head Daniel Reisner, and The Daily Telegraph, and argued that labeling Israel's actions as "genocide" cheapens the term and undermines its serious nature as defined by the UN Genocide Convention. South Africa's claims were also criticized by The Economist, for diverting attention from real issues such as potential breaches of war laws and the humanitarian crisis in Gaza, and, by David Scheffer, for ignoring Hamas' actions. The Economist and the Times of Israel argued that Israel's actions are defensive responses to Hamas, not identity-based attacks on Palestinians, and warn that these claims could weaken global genocide laws. Austrian Chancellor Karl Nehammer and Czech Prime Minister Petr Fiala argued that the country's actions could result in the politicisation of the ICJ.

==== Israeli defense ====
In statements before the court, Israel's attorneys argued it has implemented "humanitarian protective measures", such as a wide-scale evacuation notification system, to prevent civilian casualties. In a report, the Goldsmith's College research team Forensic Architecture called this claim into question, stating that rather than preventing civilian casualties, the evacuations had instead "produced mass displacement and forced transfer, and contributed to the killings of civilians throughout Gaza".

In a separate report, Forensic Architecture found that in eight instances, the Israeli defense had "misrepresented the visual evidence they cited, through a combination of incorrect annotations and labelling, and misleading verbal descriptions."

=== Following the provisional measures order ===
Third States funding or supporting Israel's actions in Gaza may need to consider the impact of the court's ruling on their actions and the ruling is considered likely to trigger cases in domestic jurisdictions.

An analysis published by Opinio Juris concluded that the Court's ruling on provisional measures "is mostly unsurprising, legally and politically significant, and represents a victory for South Africa at the provisional measures stage." This analysis stated that the Court's order of provisional measures by a significant majority "sends a strong legal and political message to Israel that its current course of action is unacceptable", and further, that "the Court firmly confirmed that the situation on the ground in Gaza is catastrophic." Israeli legal analysts confirmed that the court largely adopted the South African argument.

Following the alleged participation of UNRWA employees in the Hamas-led attack on Israel, several countries suspended funding for UNRWA. According to Francesca Albanese, the UN special rapporteur for the occupied Palestinian territories, the decision to suspend funding could be a violation of the Genocide Convention, and "overtly defies" the provisional rulings. Francesca Albanese wrote on X: "The day after International Criminal Court (ICJ) concluded that Israel is plausibly committing Genocide in Gaza, some states decided to defund UN Agency for Palestinian refugees (UNRWA)". UN special rapporteur on the right to food, Michael Fakhri, said famine was inevitable and that the funding decisions "collectively punishes over 2.2 million Palestinians." The order is expected to impact Israel's conduct in Gaza; according to Stephen Rapp, former U.S. Ambassador-at-Large for War Crimes Issues, Israel's allies will find it hard to accept noncompliance.

On 28 January 2024, a conference on resettling Gaza was attended by 11 cabinet ministers and 15 coalition members of the Israeli Knesset. According to The Guardian, their attendance appeared "to violate the international court of justice ruling last week that Israel must 'take all measures within its power' to avoid acts of genocide in its war in Gaza, including the 'prevention and punishment of genocidal rhetoric'".

In February 2024, Francesca Albanese said that Israel appears to be violating the orders of the ICJ regarding Gaza. Gisha, an Israeli human rights organization, stated that Israel was not following the provisional measure to enable humanitarian aid, stating aid agencies were under attack, unable to deliver aid safely, and were not receiving deconfliction coordination. In March 2024, an analysis by Refugees International had found that Israel was failing to fulfill its obligations under the interim orders, stating Israel had "a clear pattern of wider obstruction of relief deliveries to Gaza, and its conduct of military operations that systematically obstruct effective humanitarian action within Gaza". A group of Israel's twelve most prominent human rights organizations stated Israel was failing to comply with the court's ruling to facilitate humanitarian aid into Gaza.

Following the Court's granting South Africa's emergency measure request to increase humanitarian aid, legal expert Alonso Gurmendi stated humanitarian assistance to Gaza "is potentially what might make or break the case". In October 2024, Amnesty International stated, "It has been nine months since the ICJ warned the risk of genocide in Gaza is real yet Israeli authorities continue to violate the provisional measures ordered by the court".

In June 2024, a three-person United Nations-backed committee released a report on the war in Gaza that accused Palestinian armed groups and Israel of committing war crimes, including crimes against humanity. In what was described as having "provided the most detailed U.N. examination yet of events on and since Oct. 7," the committee noted the torture and deaths of Israelis, the allegations of rape and sexual violence, and the abduction of hostages during the 7 October attack. The report also noted, among others, Israel's use of "starvation as a weapon of war" in Gaza, the "disproportionately" high number of civilian casualties, and the use of heavy weapons in densely populated areas. While the findings of the report did not result in any penalties unto Israel or Hamas and its allies, evidence in the report could form the basis for war crime prosecutions and disputes at the ICC and ICJ.

==== Implementation of third request ====
Yuval Yoaz, an Israeli lawyer and lecturer at Tel Aviv University, described the core issue as "whether the qualification – 'which may inflict on the Palestinian group in Gaza conditions of life that could bring about its physical destruction in whole or in part' – applies only to 'any other action', or also to 'military offensive'". He was critical of the use of ambiguous language by the court, explaining that it was likely a result of an attempt to create an order supported by as many judges as possible, and the initial interpretation of the media which did not align with the meaning as later stated by the judges. However, his primary concern was that the vague order led to diverging interpretations; he was highly critical of statements made by members of the Israeli Government, which he says contributed to the amendment of the order.

Others, such as Amnesty International and Alonso Gurmendi, who is a lecturer in international relations at the University of Oxford, interpreted the order as prohibiting the Rafah offensive in its entirety. In a statement, Amnesty stated, "The ground incursion and the associated mass forced displacement it has caused, pose further irreparable risk to the rights of the Palestinian people protected under the Genocide Convention". Reed Brody, a war crimes prosecutor, stated, "These are very specific orders; stop the offensive on Rafah, open the border crossing, allow in the fact-finding missions. There's not a lot of wiggle room here". Stefan Talmon, a professor of international law at the University of Bonn and former professor at University of Oxford, argued that while a Rafah offensive can't continue in its current form, but could only be continued once steps were taken to ensure that the civilian population has access to food, water and medicine, which he described as "difficult to implement".

=== Declarations of intervention ===
On 1 May 2024, the Turkish government stated it decided to join the South African case at the ICJ. Later the same month, Egypt and the Maldives both joined the ICJ case.

On 24 May 2024, Mexico filed a declaration of intervention to join the case alleging "the deliberate obstruction of access to humanitarian assistance" and the "destruction of cultural heritage" against Israel. A few days later, President Gabriel Boric announced during the annual address to Congress that Chile will intervene and support the South African case against Israel.

On 3 June 2024, the government of the State of Palestine joined the case against Israel.

On 6 June 2024, Spain announced it was joining South Africa's case against Israel. On 22 June, Cuba announced it would also join South Africa's case against Israel.

On 7 August 2024, Turkey submitted its request for joining the ICJ case.

On 12 September 2024, Chile submitted its request for joining the ICJ case.

On 8 October 2024, Bolivia submitted its request for joining the ICJ case.

On 6 January 2025, Ireland submitted its request for joining the ICJ case.

On 31 January 2025, Belize submitted its request for joining the ICJ case.

On 3 April 2025, Nicaragua withdrew its request to join the ICJ case.

On 13 July 2025, Brazilian minister of foreign relations Mauro Vieira announced that Brazil would officially join South Africa in the ICJ case accusing Israel of committing genocide in Gaza.

On 19 September 2025, Brazil submitted its request for joining the ICJ case.

On 23 December 2025, Belgium submitted its request for joining the ICJ case.

On 22 Sept, 2026, Colombia withdrew from joining the ICJ case.

== Other international responses ==
=== States and international organizations ===
==== In support ====
South Africa's case has been supported by the following states and international organizations:

- Algeria
- Bangladesh
- Belgium
- Bolivia
- Brazil
- Chile
- China
- Comoros
- Cuba
- Djibouti
- Egypt
- Iceland
- Iraq
- Ireland
- Jordan
- Lebanon
- Libya
- Malaysia
- Maldives
- Mexico
- Namibia
- Netherlands
- Pakistan
- Palestine
- Sahrawi Arab Democratic Republic
- Saint Vincent and the Grenadines
- Spain
- Syria
- Turkey
- Venezuela
- Zimbabwe
- African Union
- Arab League
- Organisation of Islamic Cooperation
- Non-Aligned Movement

Stances of states: South Africa Countries that have supported South Africa's case Countries that have opposed South Africa's case Israel

On 10 January 2024, Brazilian President Luiz Inácio Lula da Silva expressed support for the lawsuit, with the Ministry of Foreign Affairs stating, "The president expressed his support for South Africa's initiative to call on the International Court of Justice to order Israel to immediately cease all acts and measures that may constitute genocide". Slovenia announced that it will participate in the ICJ proceedings initiated by the UN General Assembly concerning Israel's allegedly controversial activities in Gaza and the West Bank, including East Jerusalem.

On 9 January 2024, Belgian Deputy Prime Minister Petra de Sutter stated she was encouraging her government to support the suit, stating, "Belgium cannot stand by and watch the immense human suffering in Gaza. We must act against the threat of genocide". Belgium's Development Minister Caroline Gennez questioned Germany's stance, saying: "German friends: are you really going to be on the wrong side of history twice? Are we going to continue to stand by if ethnic cleansing were to take place? Surely that was 'nie wieder'? So I hope Germans will want to look deep into their own hearts, unburdened by their own historical traumas." Belgian PM Alexander De Croo and foreign minister Hadja Lahbib expressed disapproval with Gennez's comments, with the latter saying: "If we want to play a role, it should be that of mediator and not prosecutor."

On 12 January 2024, Turkish President Recep Tayyip Erdoğan expressed support for the lawsuit. On 12 January, the Russian Foreign Ministry spokeswoman Maria Zakharova said that the "massive civilian casualties during the current escalation of the Palestinian-Israeli conflict are outrageous and deeply regrettable ... And in this regard, we understand the motives of South Africa's appeal to the International Court of Justice." On 21 January, Zakharova criticised Germany for its "unfettered support [...] to Israel while dismissing any possible consequences." Russia's Special Envoy for Syria, Alexander Lavrentiev, said on 25 January that the ICJ should legally classify Israel's actions in the Gaza Strip as genocide.

On 14 January 2024, Spanish Minister of Social Rights Pablo Bustinduy stated that they were working on making the Spanish government support the suit, by stating "full support for the lawsuit that South Africa has filed against Israel to stop the genocide of the Palestinian people. We will continue to demand that Spain joins this lawsuit and ask for the immediate recognition of the Palestinian state". On 26 January 2024, the Spanish government issued a statement celebrating the International Court of Justice's decision, calling on all parties "to respect and comply with these measures in their entirety".

The Irish government initially announced it will not join South Africa's case against Israel. Taoiseach Leo Varadkar said: "I would be a little bit uncomfortable about accusing Israel, a Jewish state, of genocide given the fact that six million Jews – over half the population of Jews in Europe – were killed." On 24 January 2024, the Irish parliament voted not to support South Africa's case and instead voted to "strongly consider" intervening once the ICJ has made its order on preliminary measures. On 27 March, Ireland announced that it will intervene in the case.

Following Ugandan judge Julia Sebutinde's vote to reject South Africa's request for provisional measures, the Ugandan Ministry of Foreign Affairs released a statement that it supported South Africa's position and that Sebutinde's vote "does not in any way, reflect the position of the Government of the Republic of Uganda". In response to the court's interim ruling on the provisional measures, African Union Commission chair Moussa Faki Mahamat stated, "The ruling upholds the respect of international law and the need for Israel to imperatively comply with its obligations". The Arab League held an extraordinary session on 28 January to reach a "unified Arab stance" on how to ensure Israel's compliance with the interim ruling and how to hold it "accountable for incitement to genocide in Gaza".

Palestinian Foreign Minister Riyad al-Maliki welcomed the ICJ's interim ruling, saying it "recognised the gravity of the situation on the ground". On 30 January 2024, the deputy Palestinian representative to the UN, stated, "Invoking the genocide convention... is part of an important and decisive shift that has been in the making for a long time." In March 2024, New Zealand's Minister of Foreign Affairs Winston Peters stated, "New Zealand notes and welcomes the new additional measures issued by the International Court of Justice in its ongoing case on Gaza. We call on Israel to adhere to the new measures".

Colombia initially intervened in the case in support of South Africa, but withdrew its intervention on September 22, 2026, amid the restoration and improvement of relations between Colombia and Israel under the government of Abelardo de la Espriella.

==== In opposition ====
The following states have stated their support of Israel in opposition to the case:

- Austria
- Czech Republic
- France
- Germany (later withdrew)
- Guatemala
- Hungary
- Italy
- Paraguay
- United States
- United Kingdom

South Africa's case has been opposed by the United States; U.S. National Security Council spokesperson John Kirby said the U.S. found the "submission meritless, counterproductive, completely without any basis in fact whatsoever". U.S. Secretary of State Antony Blinken called the genocide accusation against Israel "meritless".

The Guatemalan government issued a statement saying that the filing was regrettable and that Israel was making a "legitimate defense against the attacks of the terrorist group Hamas".

Austrian Chancellor Karl Nehammer and Czech Prime Minister Petr Fiala said in a joint statement that they "oppose any attempts to politicize the ICJ".

Hungarian Foreign Minister Péter Szijjártó condemned the "legal attack launched against Israel".

British Prime Minister Rishi Sunak held the opinion that South Africa's case was "completely unjustified and wrong", according to his spokesperson. The British government was accused of double standards and hypocrisy as the UK, as well as Canada, Germany, Denmark, France and the Netherlands, joined The Gambia's ICJ case against Myanmar in November 2023 for committing the Rohingya genocide. Foreign Secretary David Cameron dismissed South Africa's ICJ genocide case as "nonsense", saying that Israel is "a democracy, a country with the rule of law, a country with armed forces that are committed to obeying the rule of law".

The German government announced its opposition to South Africa's application and its intention to intervene before the ICJ on Israel's behalf. Germany's Vice Chancellor Robert Habeck said Israel was not committing genocide in Gaza; German Foreign Minister Annalena Baerbock said the Gaza war should be characterized as "self-defence", not genocide. German support for Israel was criticized by Namibian President Hage Geingob who said Germany had failed to draw lessons after having perpetrated the 1904 Herero and Namaqua genocide (in present-day Namibia): "Germany cannot morally express commitment to the United Nations Convention against genocide, including atonement for the genocide in Namibia, whilst supporting the equivalent of a holocaust and genocide in Gaza." In March 2026 Germany withdrew from the case and announced it would no longer be making submissions on Israel's behalf, citing the need to prepare for its own ICJ case.

==== Neutrality ====
Canada's Prime Minister, Justin Trudeau, said he did not accept the premise of South Africa's genocide motion, although Global Affairs Canada has stated that Canada will abide by the ICJ ruling in the case. Opposition Conservative Leader Pierre Poilievre accused Trudeau of "sinister and hypocritical" doublespeak on the issue. Canada's unclear position caused confusion, and it was initially widely misreported that Canada opposed the application. Israel's Consul-General in Toronto, Idit Shamir, claimed that "Canada is siding with Israel in its defence against allegations of genocide." On 18 January 2024, Israel's ambassador to Canada called on the Canadian government to clarify its position.

Australian Prime Minister Anthony Albanese declared that the Australian government will not participate in South Africa's genocide case against Israel. Australian Foreign Minister Penny Wong said that "Our support for the ICJ and respect for its independence does not mean we accept the premise of South Africa's case". Leader of the Opposition, Peter Dutton, has criticised the Australian government's stance in failing to oppose the case against Israel, for voting to grant additional rights to the Palestinian delegation at the UN, for granting visas to Palestinians fleeing the conflict and for failing to vote against a UN vote that called for Israel to end the occupation of the Palestinian territories.

The European Commission's spokesperson on foreign affairs, Peter Stano, stated that "The European Union is not part of this lawsuit...This is not for us to comment at all." Later, after the ICJ made the provisional measures ruling, the Commission stated "Orders of the International Court of Justice are binding on the parties and they must comply with them. The EU expects their full, immediate and effective implementation."

Nicaragua initially intervened in the case against Israel, but withdrew its intervention on April 3, 2025.

=== Movements, parties, and unions ===
The lawsuit has also been supported by hundreds of activist groups, NGOs, political parties, unions, and other organizations, with (as of mid-January 2024) over 1,400 showing support in the form of a letter organized by the newly-formed International Coalition to Stop Genocide in Palestine. Some of that letter's signatories, and other supportive organizations, include:

- Al-Haq
- Al-Mezan Center for Human Rights
- Amnesty International
- Boycott from Within
- CodePink
- De-Colonizer
- Democratic Socialists of America
- Human Rights Watch
- International Jewish Anti-Zionist Network
- International Peoples' Assembly
- Israeli Committee Against House Demolitions
- Israelis Against Apartheid
- Jewish Voice for Peace
- La Via Campesina
- National Lawyers Guild
- Nelson Mandela Foundation
- New Zealand Labour Party
- Palestinian Centre for Human Rights
- Palestinian General Federation of Trade Unions
- Palestinian NGO Network
- Progressive International
- RootsAction
- People's Forum
- Women's International League for Peace and Freedom
- World Beyond War
- World March of Women

=== Individuals and other groups ===
==== Public opinion ====
A poll in August 2025 by The Economist and YouGov showed an increase in the percentage of Americans who believe Israel is committing genocide against Palestinian civilians. In this poll, 43% responded "yes," compared to 28% who said "no," while 29% remained unsure. This marks a rise from a January 2024 poll by the same organizations, where 35% answered "yes," 36% said "no," and 29% were unsure.

A June 2024 poll by Léger and commissioned by the National Post found that 45% of Canadians believe that Israel is committing genocide in the Gaza Strip, with 23% saying that it isn't, and 32% saying that they don't know.

In June 2025, a YouGov poll commissioned by Action for Humanity and the International Centre of Justice for Palestinians found that 45% of adults in the UK believe that Israel’s actions in Gaza "amount to the crime of genocide".

==== Academics ====
Raz Segal, an Israeli historian of genocide, stated the case was notable due to the "mountain of evidence on genocidal intent that's been expressed by people with command authority". Responding to the court's ruling on the provisional measures, Ilias Bantekas, a professor at Hamad Bin Khalifa University, stated, "Reading between the lines, this is a clear call that there is evidence that Israel has committed genocide." Professor Diana Buttu criticized Canada's response to the interim ruling for including "racist Israeli talking points". A group of New Zealand's legal experts, led by David Williams and Jane Kelsey, signed an open-letter urging Prime Minister Christopher Luxon to support South Africa's petition.

Marco Sassoli, a professor of international law at the University of Geneva, said that not "everyone in the West is in favour of Israel and [not] everyone in the Global South is opposed to Israel," adding that "Both Western States and the Global South have double standards. Double standards are a poison for the credibility of international law." Professor Alan Dershowitz argued that Israel made a mistake in submitting to the jurisdiction of the ICJ court, because "...it is not a real court...it reflects foreign policy, not rule of law, not judiciary". He further asserted that "[the accusation of genocide against Israel] ...is one of the most absurd abuses of the judicial process in modern history".

==== Officials ====
Rosalie Silberman Abella, a former puisne justice of the Supreme Court of Canada, called the ICJ proceedings an "abuse of the principles of the international legal order." Pierre Poilievre, leader of Canada's official opposition, the Conservative Party, called the accusation "a shameless and dishonest attack on Jewish people and the Jewish state."

Ofer Cassif, an Israeli politician representing the left-wing party Hadash, signed South Africa's petition and accused Israel of genocide. In response, lawmakers began proceedings to expel him from the Knesset. The motion ultimately failed to obtain the required super-majority in the Knesset and Cassif retained his seat. However, other Israeli officials rejected the ruling and two ministers in the coalition government accused the court of having an antisemitic bias.

Volker Türk, the United Nations High Commissioner for Human Rights, said: "It is not a blood libel to deplore the failure to hold to account Israeli soldiers and armed settlers who have killed hundreds of Palestinians in the West Bank since October 7, or the prolongation of a war whose conduct has raised grave international humanitarian and human rights law concerns."

UK Shadow Foreign Secretary David Lammy stated the ICJ interim ruling "sets out urgent provisional measures that must be followed. Israel must now comply with the orders in this ruling in full".

==== Religious groups ====
The National Council of Canadian Muslims said it was "beyond disappointed" by the Canadian government's response.

Christian Zionist groups throughout South Africa, including Christian View Network, Bridges for Peace and International Christian Embassy in Jerusalem, condemned their government's decision to take Israel to the ICJ.

==== Other ====
On 9 January 2024, an open letter to the ICJ signed by over 600 Israelis stated their support for South Africa's case. On 18 January, a group of survivors of the Bosnian genocide wrote an open-letter to the ICJ, urging the court to "implement necessary provisional measures swiftly to protect Palestinians in Gaza" and avoid repeating the "grievous mistake" of failing to protect civilians from genocide.

Writing for Foreign Policy, Sasha Polakow-Suransky criticized the South African government for hypocrisy and double standards, recalling that South Africa failed to arrest Sudanese President Omar al-Bashir during his visit to South Africa, despite Bashir being accused of genocide and wanted by the International Criminal Court (ICC), and did not condemn Russia's invasion of Ukraine and was reluctant to comply with the International Criminal Court's arrest warrant for Russian President Vladimir Putin. Likewise, the analyst Stephan Pechdimaldji, in Foreign Policy, said Turkey's request to join the case "highlights the unfettered hypocrisy that characterizes genocide allegations made by many governments", writing that Turkey's continued denial of the Armenian genocide gives it "little credibility being an arbiter of what constitutes genocide". He argued that allowing Turkey to join the case demonstrated the international community's tendency to treat genocide allegations as a political football rather than as a serious matter.

== Impact ==
One week after the ICJ issued its provisional ruling, South African foreign minister Naledi Pandor stated that Israel was ignoring the court's order, with the IDF killing nearly 1,000 people in those seven days. (Note: One week after making this statement, Pandor stated that she had received threatening messages from Israeli intelligence against her and her family.) As early as December 2023 activists in Israel were attempting to block humanitarian aid entering the Gaza Strip with some activists either referencing or related to hostages still in Gaza, even after the decision. Islamic Relief, a UK-based charity, stated on 9 February that the situation in Gaza had worsened since the ICJ issued its provisional order.

On 5 February 2024, the aviation unit of Itochu stated it was ending its strategic partnership with Elbit Systems, citing the ICJ's provisional order to prevent acts of genocide against Palestinians. On 6 February the Government of Wallonia in Belgium announced it was temporarily suspending two ammunition export licenses to Israel, citing the ICJ interim ruling.

As of 10 February, UN special rapporteur Francesca Albanese said that Israel appears to be in breach of the ICJ orders as Israeli forces had killed at least 1,755 Palestinians since the order was issued, and have continued to block humanitarian aid for the Gaza population. On 15 February, Alex de Waal, a British academic, stated that rather than complying with the ICJ order, Israel had instead "intensified its activity". Amnesty International stated on 26 February that Israel had failed to take the "bare minimum" steps to comply with the ICJ order, while creating "one of the worst humanitarian crises in the world". Human Rights Watch stated Israel had "failed to comply" with the ICJ's provisional measures and had instead committed "acts of collective punishment that amount to war crimes and include the use of starvation of civilians as a weapon of war."

== See also ==
- Israel–South Africa relations
- Court cases
  - International Criminal Court investigation in Palestine
  - ICJ
    - Legal Consequences of the Construction of a Wall in the Occupied Palestinian Territory
    - Legal consequences arising from the policies and practices of Israel in the occupied Palestinian territory including East Jerusalem
    - List of International Court of Justice cases
  - Rohingya genocide case
  - Croatia–Serbia genocide case
  - Ukraine v. Russian Federation (2022)
  - Nicaragua v. Germany
- War crimes and genocide
  - Israeli war crimes
  - War and genocide
  - Genocides in history (21st century)
  - Ten stages of genocide
  - Israeli apartheid
  - Israeli generals' plan
- 21st century genocides

== Bibliography ==
- Alexander, Atul (2024). "Application of the Convention on the Prevention and Punishment of the Crime of Genocide in the Gaza Strip (South Africa v. Israel) at the International Court of Justice". Chinese Journal of International Law. 23 (1): 185–190. doi:10.1093/chinesejil/jmae004. ISSN 1540-1650.
- Krever, Tor; Veličković, Marina; Mégret, Frédéric; Engle, Karen; Ní Aoláin, Fionnuala; Knox, Robert; Hammouri, Shahd; Quigley, John; Jaber, Nora; Rigney, Sophie; Kendall, Sara; da Silva, Clare; Schwöbel-Patel, Christine; Samour, Nahed; Burgis-Kasthala, Michelle; Teitel, Ruti G; Korhonen, Outi; Bowring, Bill; Allen, Lori A; Chandler, David; Nesiah, Vasuki; Pappé, Ilan; Fakhri, Michael; Miller, Zinaida; Drumbl, Mark A; Sayed, Hani; Tzouvala, Ntina; Joyce, Daniel; Douzinas, Costas; Edelbi, Souheir; Hoffmann, Florian; Jallad, Zeina; Becker Lorca, Arnulf; Hajyahia, Alaa; Kolabhai, Reshard L; Almeida Cravo, Teresa; Chiam, Madelaine; Quintana, Francisco-José; Betancur-Restrepo, Laura; Fernandes Carvalho, Fabia; Kulamadayil, Lys; Li, Darryl; Reynolds, John; Sayed, Abdelghany; Eslava, Luis; Whyte, Jessica; Clark, Martin; Clements, Richard; Gevers, Christopher; Shalbak, Ihab; Uriburu, Justina; Özsu, Umut; Hernández, Gleider; Tallgren, Immi (2024). "On international law and Gaza: critical reflections". London Review of International Law. 12 (2): 217–301. doi:10.1093/lril/lrae012.
- "World Court to hear Genocide Case Against Israel". Human Rights Watch. 10 January 2024. Archived from the original on 10 January 2024.
- Duffy, Helen; Pinzauti, Giulia (2025). "The International Court of Justice in Conflict: Reflections on the Role and Impact of the Palestine Litigation". Unity in Diversity: Perspectives on the Law of International Organizations. Brill Nijhoff. pp. 232–248. ISBN 978-90-04-69993-9.
