= Balkees Jarrah =

Balkees Jarrah is a lawyer who serves as associate director of Human Rights Watch's International Justice Program.

== Career ==
Jarrah has a law degree from McGill University and a master's degree from Oxford and previously worked at the Brookings Institution. As part of her role as a Human Rights Watch associate director, Jarrah leads the International Justice Program's research and advocacy team on universal jurisdiction. She was involved in efforts to prosecute war crimes committed during the Syrian civil war, applying the legal concept of universal jurisdiction and advocating for transitional justice. Commenting on a 2013 Human Rights Watch report advocating for a holistic approach to pursuing justice in Syria, Jarrah explained that the international community "will need both a variety of judicial tools for justice in Syria and a long-term vision that avoids pitting one measure against another". She criticized of the lack of accountability in past conflicts which gave actors in Syria "no reason to change their behavior", explaining that transitional justice measures should complement, not substitute prosecutions. In 2014, Jarrah made the case to the Obama administration that the United States should support ICC involvement in Syria. She has also argued that there is legal precedent supporting the jurisdiction of parties to the Convention against Torture to bring Syria before the ICJ under the treaty, regardless of whether they had been directly impacted by violations.

Following the landmark 2022 conviction of a Syrian official in Germany, she described the verdict as "a breakthrough for Syrian victims and the German justice system in cracking the wall of impunity". In November 2023, after the ICJ issued binding provisional measures to prevent Syria's violations of the international Convention against Torture, Jarrah described the ruling as "a matter of life or death for many Syrians".

In January 2024, amid the ongoing Gaza war, Jarrah argued that the ICJ's issuance of binding provisional measures in response to South Africa's genocide case against Israel was "unprecedented" and called for their immediate implementation. She added that, "governments need to urgently use their leverage to ensure that the order is enforced". Following the issuance of additional provisional measures in May 2024, she argued that the ICJ's rulings would have little effect unless the international community abided by their obligations to enforce them.

In November 2024, following the ICC's issuance of arrest warrants for Israeli Prime Minister Netanyahu, Israeli Defense Minister Yoav Gallant, and Hamas official Mohammad Deif, Jarrah said, "The ICC arrest warrants against senior Israeli leaders and a Hamas official break through the perception that certain individuals are beyond the reach of the law." She added, "Whether the ICC can effectively deliver on its mandate will depend on governments' willingness to support justice no matter where abuses are committed and by whom."
