= Tshidiso Ramogale =

South African social justice advocate

- Born: c. 1992 (age 33–34); Johannesburg, South Africa
- Education: University of the Witwatersrand (LLB); Harvard Law School (LLM)

Tshidiso Ramogale (born c. 1992) is a South African advocate. He is known for his work in social justice.

== Early life and education ==
Ramogale is from Johannesburg. He has an older sister. He graduated from the University of the Witwatersrand in 2014 with a Bachelor of Laws (LLB); Ramogale is the first member of his family to graduate from university. He went on to complete a Master of Laws (LLM) in International Law and Legal Studies at Harvard Law School in 2017.

== Career ==
In 2014, Ramogale appeared on the Mail & Guardian's 2014 list of 200 Young South Africans. Prior to studying at Harvard, Ramogale was a legal officer at the South African Human Rights Commission and a law clerk to judge Sisi Khampepe. He founded the nonprofit organisation Change SA, which helps young South Africans become social entrepreneurs, and is an Allan Gray fellow.

Upon returning to South Africa after graduating from Harvard in 2017, Ramogale became an Advocate of the High Court of South Africa. He was also briefly a sessional lecturer at his alma mater Wits University and joined the Johannesburg Society of Advocates. In 2019, Ramogale was called to the Pan African Bar Association of South Africa.

== Notable cases ==
In 2021 and 2022, Ramogale successfully provided legal counsel to the late rapper Kiernan Forbes (AKA) in Forbes' battle with Makhuducom Media for ownership of The Brai Show and to AmaBhungane with Steven Budlender.

In January 2024, Ramogale appeared in the Hague as a member of the legal team representing South Africa's proceedings accusing Israel of genocide at the International Court of Justice (ICJ).
