= Adila Hassim =

South African barrister

Adv. Adila Hassim SC
- Born: 1972 (age 53–54)
- Education: University of Natal; Saint Louis University; Notre Dame Law School

Adila Hassim SC (born 1972) is a South African advocate. She rose to international prominence as a member of the legal team in the South Africa vs. Israel case at the International Court of Justice (ICJ) in January 2024.

== Early life and education ==
Hassim was born in 1972. She graduated with a Bachelor of Arts (BA) and Bachelor of Laws (LLB) from the University of Natal. She was awarded the Franklin Thomas Fellowship to pursue a Master of Laws (LLM) at the Saint Louis University School of Law of Saint Louis, Missouri, graduating in 1999, and the Rev Lewers–Bradlow Foundation Fellowship to become a Doctor of the Science of Law (JSD) at Notre Dame Law School of Notre Dame, Indiana, which she completed in 2006.

== Career ==
Hassim was a Constitutional Court law clerk to Pius Langa and Edwin Cameron, participating in the 1997 Soobramoney v Minister of Health case. Hassim was admitted to the Johannesburg Society of Advocates, South Africa's largest Bar, in 2003. In the 2000s, Hassim worked for the AIDS Law Project. In 2007, she sat on a Treatment Action Campaign (TAC) committee alongside the likes of Andrew Feinstein and Cheryl Gillwald to support Nozizwe Madlala-Routledge in the wake of her dismissal as Deputy Minister of Health.

Hassim co-edited Health & Democracy: A Guide to Human Rights and Health Law and Policy in Post-apartheid South Africa (2007) and The National Health Act: A Guide (2008). She also wrote a number of articles for the Mail & Guardian.

In 2010, Hassim helped found the public-interest organisation Section27, where she went on to serve as Director of Litigation. She is also a founding member of Corruption Watch.

In 2020, Hassim became a Senior Counsel at Thulamela Chambers. She currently serves on the Madlanga Commission, an independent inquiry into criminality, political interference and corruption in South Africa's Criminal Justice System.

== Notable cases ==
Hassim worked on the Limpopo Textbooks Case, which went to the Supreme Court of Appeal in 2015. She represented Sonke Gender Justice and the Treatment Action Campaign in the 2015 Silicosis class action lawsuit against 32 mining companies in court. In 2017, Hassim became Lead Counsel in the Life Esidimeni Arbitration, representing Section27 and the mental healthcare patients who died in the scandal.

In January 2024, Hassim appeared in The Hague as a member of the legal team representing South Africa's proceedings accusing Israel of genocide at the International Court of Justice (ICJ).

== Bibliography ==
- Health & Democracy: A Guide to Human Rights and Health Law and Policy in Post-Apartheid South Africa (2007), editor
- The National Health Act: A Guide (2008), editor
- South African Constitutional Law (2023)
