= Memorial (law) =

In law, a memorial is a legal document which contains a statement of facts or a summary of information related to a case, addressed to a government or a legislature. It commonly accompanies a petition. Often the petition itself is called "memorial", synonymously with "memorandum"/"memo".
