= Yogev Bar Sheshet =

Israeli brigadier general

- יוגב בר ששת
- Born: 1979 (age 46–47)
- Education: Military Boarding School for Command
- Military career
- Allegiance: Israel
- Branch: Israeli Ground Forces
- Service years: 1997–present
- Rank: Brigadier general
- Commands: Battalion 50; Yoav Brigade
- Conflicts: 2006 Lebanon War; Operation Brother's Keeper; 2014 Gaza War; Gaza war

Yogev Bar Sheshet (Hebrew: יוגב בר ששת; born 1979) is an officer in the Israel Defense Forces (IDF) with the rank of brigadier general. He currently serves as Deputy Comptroller of the Israel security establishment. Previously, he served as Deputy Head of the Civil Administration, Deputy Commander of the Steel Formation, Commander of the Yoav Brigade, Operations Officer of the Southern Command, and Commander of Battalion 50.

Bar Sheshet was moderately wounded during the Gaza war. As of May 2024, he was the most senior IDF officer wounded during the war.

== Biography ==
Bar Sheshet attended the Military Boarding School for Command at Merkaz Shapira. He enlisted in the Israel Defense Forces (IDF) and was placed in Battalion 51 of the Golani Brigade. He underwent training as a fighter, and took the Infantry Commanders Course and Infantry Officers Course. At the end of the course, he was appointed as a company commander in the Bislamach Brigade. Subsequently, he served as a deputy company commander and later as a company commander in Bislamach. He then moved to the Nahal Brigade and was appointed as a company commander, serving in this role during the Second Lebanon War. After the war, he was appointed as the commander of Nahal's advanced training company. He later served as the Deputy Commander of Battalion 50 and subsequently as the commander of the advanced training cycle in Nahal Training Base.

In 2012, Bar Sheshet was promoted to the rank of lieutenant colonel and appointed as the commander of the Northern Battalion, a regional battalion in the Bar'am Formation, and served in this position until 2014. In May 2014, he was appointed as the commander of Battalion 50, leading it during Operation Brother's Keeper, and then again in Beit Hanoun during Operation Protective Edge, ending his role on June 21, 2016. Afterwards, he was appointed as the Operations Officer of the Southern Command between 2016 and 2019. On June 19, 2019, he was promoted to the rank of colonel and appointed as the commander of the Yoav Brigade, a position he held until September 12, 2021. In 2021, he was appointed as Deputy Commander of the Steel Formation, serving in this position until 2022. In August 2022, he was appointed as Deputy Head of the Civil Administration. On September 3, 2023, he was promoted to the rank of brigadier general, and appointed as Deputy Comptroller of the Israel security establishment.

During the Gaza war, Bar Sheshet petitioned Civil Administration head Fares Atila to allow him to take command of the Nahal Brigade after its previous commander, Yonatan Steinberg, was killed in the fighting. Bar Sheshet was serving as Battalion Commander B when he was moderately wounded by shrapnel that hit him in the shoulder during an operation in the Zeitoun neighborhood in southern Gaza. Bar Sheshet, who was evacuated to Ichilov Hospital, was the most senior IDF officer to be wounded during the war as of May 2024.

On October 2026 Bar Sheshet was dismissed from the IDF after a command review into alleged Abuse of authority and disclosure of classified information.

== Opinions ==
Bar Sheshet has been outspoken on political and military affairs as they pertain to the Israeli–Palestinian conflict. Regarding operations commanded in Jenin, he said "I told the soldiers that there is no joy in seeing a person killed, even if it is a terrorist. There is no sense of transcendence. You are happy that you completed the mission and that the terrorist will no longer harm other civilians. This is purity of arms. You do the best you can. Professional, sharp. We are not bloodthirsty". During the initial phase of the Gaza war he said, referring to Palestinians who had been displaced from their homes in the Gaza Strip, "Whoever returns here, if they return here after, will find scorched earth. No houses, no agriculture, no nothing. They have no future." The statement was cited in South Africa's genocide case against Israel.

== Personal life ==
Bar Sheshet lives in Neta, is married, and has six children. Although he was raised in an Orthodox Jewish home, he is no longer observant.
