= Party lists for the 1984 Israeli legislative election =

The 1984 Israeli legislative election was held using closed list proportional representation. Each party presented a list of candidates to the Central Elections Committee prior to the election.

== Alignment ==
The Alignment list, a joint list between the Israeli Labor Party, Mapam and the Independent Liberals, is led by Shimon Peres.

1. Shimon Peres
2. Yitzhak Navon
3. Yitzhak Rabin
4. Haim Bar-Lev
5. Abba Eban
6. Victor Shem-Tov
7. Yisrael Kessar
8. Gad Yaacobi
9. Shoshana Arbeli-Almozlino
10. Elazar Granot
11. Mordechai Gur
12. Moshe Shahal
13. Rafael Edri
14. Shlomo Hillel
15. Ora Namir
16. Eliyahu Speiser
17. Uzi Baram
18. Aryeh Nehemkin
19. Yair Tzaban
20. Avraham Katz-Oz
21. Ya'akov Tzur
22. Yitzhak Peretz
23. Menachem Hacohen
24. Nava Arad
25. Yossi Sarid
26. Amira Sartani
27. Jacques Amir
28. Michael Harish
29. Shevah Weiss
30. Amnon Linn
31. Adiel Amorai
32. David Libai
33. Muhammed Wattad
34. Dov Ben-Meir
35. Haim Ramon
36. Efraim Shalom
37. Nahman Raz
38. Edna Solodar
39. Yitzhak Artzi
40. Haika Grossman
41. Aharon Harel
42. Abdulwahab Darawshe
43. Simcha Dinitz
44. Aharon Nahmias
45. Ya'akov Gil
46. Gadi Yatziv
47. Avraham Shochat
48. Rafael Suissa
49. Uri Sebag
50. Yehiel Leket
51. Michael Bar-Zohar
52. Yehuda Hashai
53. Shaul Ben Simhon
54. Yossi Beilin
55. Micha Goldman
56. Shimon Sheetrit
57. Yitzhak Elishiv
58. Rina Dotan
59. Haneh Hadad
60. Elisha Shapira
61. Yitzhak Haziza
62. David Glass
63. Menachem Ariav
64. Rafi Bar-Lavi
65. Saadia Marciano
66. Ra'anan Naim
67. Yeshayahu Perry
68. Yehuda Schuster
69. Yehuda Ben-Harush
70. Moshe Amar
71. David Levy
72. Amram Lok
73. Yosef Schperling
74. Yosef Katz
75. Aliza Tamir
76. Avshalom Vilan
77. Rafaela Bilsky Ben-Hur
78. Emanuel Zisman
79. Yael Dayan
80. Haim Lichtenberg
81. Yoram Oberkovich
82. Sabari Huri
83. Amos Carmel
84. Tsfora Tzur
85. Nissim Eliad
86. Eli Ben-Menachem
87. Amiram Nir
88. Shmuel Ohana
89. Efraim Koren
90. Shalom Haddad

== Likud ==
The Likud list, then a joint list of Herut and the Israeli Liberal Party, was led by Yitzhak Shamir.

1. Yitzhak Shamir
2. David Levy
3. Yitzhak Moda'i
4. Moshe Arens
5. Ariel Sharon
6. Moshe Nissim
7. Yigal Cohen-Orgad
8. Yoram Aridor
9. Avraham Sharir
10. Eliezer Shostak
11. Eliyahu Ben-Elissar
12. Moshe Katsav
13. Pesah Grupper
14. David Magen
15. Roni Milo
16. Gideon Patt
17. Meir Sheetrit
18. Dov Shilansky
19. Yitzhak Seiger
20. Michael Dekel
21. Michael Reisser
22. Gideon Gadot
23. Ariel Weinstein
24. Ehud Olmert
25. Haim Corfu
26. Sarah Doron
27. Miriam Glazer-Ta'asa
28. Amal Nasser el-Din
29. Pinchas Goldstein
30. Meir Cohen-Avidov
31. Haim Kaufman
32. Yehoshua Matza
33. Dan Tichon
34. Ovadia Eli
35. Dan Meridor
36. Uriel Lynn
37. Uzi Landau
38. Michael Eitan
39. Benny Shalita
40. Yigal Cohen
41. Eliezer Kulas
42. Ya'akov Shamai
43. David Mor
44. Mordechai Tzipori
45. Eitan Livni
46. Naftali Nir
47. Moshe Meron
48. Yehuda Perah
49. Michael Kleiner
50. Rachel Kemmerman
51. Reuven Rivlin
52. Moshe Rom
53. Avraham Hirschson
54. Yedidia Be'eri
55. Shlomo Gervetz
56. Dov Barzilay
57. David Stern
58. Elyakim Badian
59. Akiva Nof
60. Eli Landau
61. Aryeh Kremmer
62. Daniel Nahmani
63. Avi Yeker Alentzwig
64. Shlomo Tal
65. Avraham Yoel
66. David Hagoel
67. Div Almi
68. Daniel Asnin
69. Shaul Amor
70. Tzila Amidror
71. David Knafo
72. Shlomo Yarkoni
73. Haniya Rappaport
74. Yehosha Nahari
75. Moshe Maimon
76. Yona Barazani
77. Menachem Cohen
78. Yosef Goldberg
79. Aliza Yerushalmi
80. Shalom Pitchedva
81. Amram Edri
82. Dov Avidan
83. Aharon Pappo
84. Viktor Shaharvani
85. Yosef Ilouz
86. Reuven Vitella
87. Gabriel Levy
88. Shareen Solan
89. Avraham Rona'i
90. Muhammad Zuvidat

== Tehiya-Tzomet ==
The joint list between Tehiya and Tzomet was led by Yuval Ne'eman.

1. Yuval Ne'eman
2. Rafi Eitan
3. Geulah Cohen
4. Eliezer Waldman
5. Gershon Shafat
6. Zvi Shiloah
7. Efraim Ben-Haim
8. Eliezer Argamaan
9. Tuvia Leshem
10. Dov Keren

== National Religious Party ==
The National Religious Party list was led by Yosef Burg.

1. Yosef Burg
2. Zevulun Hammer
3. Avner Shaki
4. David Danino
5. Yosef Guetta
6. Avraham Melamed
7. Yehuda Ben-Meir
8. Avraham Stern
9. Yosef Fischler
10. Shalom Cohen

== Hadash ==
The Hadash list was led by Meir Vilner.

1. Meir Vilner
2. Tawfik Toubi
3. Charlie Biton
4. Tawfiq Ziad
5. Hashem Mahameed
6. Hussein Samih Al-Qassem
7. Dov Khenin
8. Tamar Gozansky
9. Ali Sna'allah
10. Mordechai Ish-Yair

== Shas ==
The Shas list was led by Yitzhak Peretz.

1. Yitzhak Peretz
2. Rafael Pinhasi
3. Ya'akov Yosef
4. Shimon Ben-Shlomo
5. Ya'akov Cohen
6. Ya'kov Hamad
7. Moshe Monsongo
8. Rafael Tahala
9. Zeret Meshulam
10. Yitzhak Sharbani

== Shinui ==
The Shinui list was led by Amnon Rubinstein.

1. Amnon Rubinstein
2. Mordechai Virshubski
3. Zeidan Atashi
4. Yoram Alster
5. Yehoshua Porath
6. Rina Sha'ashua Hasson
7. Zion Algarsi
8. Avraham Poraz
9. Moshe Becker
10. Roei Raviv

== Ratz ==
The Ratz list was led by Shulamit Aloni.

1. Shulamit Aloni
2. Mordechai Bar-On
3. Ran Cohen
4. David Zucker
5. Dina Goren
6. Boaz Moav
7. Binyamin Temkin
8. Zeidan Zeidan
9. Efraim Blumenfeld
10. Henry Haim Scribbel

== Yahad ==
The Yahad list was led by Ezer Weizman.

1. Ezer Weizmann
2. Binyamin Ben-Eliezer
3. Shlomo Amar
4. Mordechai Hod
5. Shlomo Bohbot
6. Muhammad Masrawwa
7. Miriam Laufer
8. Paul Kader
9. Michael Perry
10. Gad Pnini

== Progressive List for Peace ==
The Progressive List for Peace was led by Mohammed Miari.

1. Mohammed Miari
2. Mattityahu Peled
3. Riah Abu El-Assal
4. Walid Haj Yahia
5. Ya'akov Arnon
6. Hassan Al-Uqabi
7. Ruchama Marton
8. Oded Pilevsky
9. Ahmad Nasser
10. Aharon Pinhasi

== Agudat Yisrael ==
The Agudat Yisrael list was led by Avraham Yosef Shapira.

1. Avraham Yosef Shapira
2. Menachem Porush
3. Shimon Siroka
4. Shmuel Halpert
5. Yosef Melamed
6. Yitzhak Meir
7. Meir Luria
8. Haim Brilant
9. Eliezer Moses
10. David Vinberg

== Morasha ==
The Morasha list was led by Haim Drukman.

1. Haim Drukman
2. Avraham Verdiger
3. Yitzhak Levy
4. Hanan Porat
5. Ahiezer Shaki
6. Shlomo Zalman Druk
7. Meir Har-Noy
8. Eitan Ben-David
9. Uri Elitsur
10. Binyamin Yesharim

== Tami ==
The Tami list was led by Aharon Abuhatzira.

1. Aharon Abuhatzira
2. Ben-Zion Rubin
3. Eli Dayan
4. Shalom Danino
5. Daniel Azriel

== Kach ==
The Kach list was led by Meir Kahane.

1. Meir Kahane
2. Yehuda Richter
3. Baruch Goldstein
4. Avner Ozen
5. Ze'ev Hartman

== Ometz ==
The Ometz list was led by Yigal Hurvitz.

1. Yigal Hurvitz
2. Zalman Shoval
3. Yitzhak Saluki
4. Ruth Shamir
5. Aharon Katz

== Extraparliamentary parties ==
The following are parties which won no seats in the 1984 election.

=== Lova Eliav ===
the Lova Eliav list was led by Lova Eliav.

1. Lova Eliav
2. David Ohana
3. Rachel Yaakovson
4. Yigal Vilfand

=== Handicapped Organisation ===
The Handicapped Organization list was led by Yehuda Doron.

1. Yehuda Doron
2. Aryeh Tsodkovitz
3. Yair Tzuri
4. Moshe Golan

=== Movement for the Renewal of Social Zionism ===
The Movement for the Renewal of Social Zionism list was led by Mordechai Ben-Porat.

1. Mordechai Ben-Porat
2. Shlomo Ifrah
3. Avraham Even-Hai
4. Ravi Batat

=== Aliyah and Youth Movement ===
The Aliyah and Youth Movement list was led by Avraham Sapir.

1. Avraham Sapir
2. Georg Mordel
3. Vladimir Dudkin
4. Yosef Motzegoshvili

=== Shiluv ===
The Shiluv list was led by Tsfania Tzirker.

1. Tsfania Tzirker
2. David Shimshon
3. Raymond Ya'akov
4. Daniel Shurdker

=== Independence ===
The Independence list was led by Ezra Zohar.

1. Ezra Zohar
2. Mark Heinrich
3. Doron Raz
4. Barak Amarmi

=== National Organisation for the Defence of the Tenant ===
The National Organisation for the Defence of the Tenant list was led by Eliyahu Schmidt.

1. Eliyahu Schmidt
2. Latif Hai
3. Aharon Milgrom
4. David Abudi

=== Development and Peace ===
The Development and Peace list was led by Shmuel Flatto-Sharon.

1. Shmuel Flatto-Sharon
2. Shlomo Ohaion
3. Yosef Pe'er
4. Muhammad Halabi

=== Has Mas ===
The Has Mas list was led by Ya'akov Berger, who was its sole candidate.

=== Movement for the Homeland ===
The Movement for the Homeland list was led by Bentzi Koren.

1. Bentzi Koren
2. Binyamin Edelman
3. Hezekiah Rahamim

=== Amkha ===
The Amkha list was led by Victor Tayar, who was its sole candidate.
