= List of members of the tenth Knesset =

The 120 members of the tenth Knesset were elected on 30 June 1981. The breakdown by party was as follows:

- Likud: 48
- Alignment: 47
- National Religious Party: 6
- Agudat Yisrael: 4
- Hadash: 4
- Tehiya: 3
- Tami: 3
- Telem: 2
- Shinui: 2
- Ratz: 1

== List of members ==
Member	Party	Notes
Moshe Arens	Likud	
Yoram Aridor	Likud	
Menachem Begin	Likud	
Eliyahu Ben-Elissar	Likud	
Yitzhak Berman	Likud	
Meir Cohen-Avidov	Likud	
Yigal Cohen-Orgad	Likud	
Yigal Cohen	Likud	
Haim Corfu	Likud	
Michael Dekel	Likud	
Sarah Doron	Likud	
Simha Erlich	Likud	
Miriam Glazer-Ta'asa	Likud	
Pinhas Goldstein	Likud	
Pesach Grupper	Likud	
Moshe Katsav	Likud	
Haim Kaufman	Likud	
Eliezer Kulas	Likud	
David Levy	Likud	
Amnon Linn	Likud	Left party to join the Alignment
Eitan Livni	Likud	
David Magen	Likud	
Ya'akov Meridor	Likud	
Roni Milo	Likud	
Yitzhak Moday	Likud	
Amal Nasser el-Din	Likud	
Moshe Nissim	Likud	
Akiva Nof	Likud	
Ehud Olmert	Likud	
Gideon Patt	Likud	
Yehuda Perah	Likud	
Yitzhak Peretz	Likud	Left party to join the Alignment
Michael Reisser	Likud	
Zvi Rener	Likud	
Yosef Rom	Likud	
Menachem Savidor	Likud	
Yitzhak Seyger	Likud	
Benny Shalita	Likud	
Yitzhak Shamir	Likud	
Avraham Sharir	Likud	
Ariel Sharon	Likud	
Meir Sheetrit	Likud	
David Shiffman	Likud	
Dov Shilansky	Likud	
Eliezer Shostak	Likud	
Dan Tichon	Likud	
Dror Zeigerman	Likud	
Mordechai Tzipori	Likud	
Jacques Amir	Alignment	
Adiel Amorai	Alignment	
Nava Arad	Alignment	
Shoshana Arbeli-Almozlino	Alignment	
Haim Bar-Lev	Alignment	
Michael Bar-Zohar	Alignment	
Uzi Baram	Alignment	
Dov Ben-Meir	Alignment	
Naftali Blumenthal	Alignment	
Abba Eban	Alignment	
Rafael Edri	Alignment	
Tamar Eshel	Alignment	
Naftali Feder	Alignment	
Ya'akov Gil	Alignment	
Elazar Granot	Alignment	
Mordechai Gur	Alignment	
Menachem Hacohen	Alignment	
Aharon Harel	Alignment	
Moshe Harif	Alignment	
Michael Harish	Alignment	
Yehuda Hashai	Alignment	
Chaim Herzog	Alignment	
Shlomo Hillel	Alignment	
Avraham Katz-Oz	Alignment	
Hamad Khalaily	Alignment	
Yeruham Meshel	Alignment	
Aharon Nahmias	Alignment	
Ra'anan Naim	Alignment	
Ora Namir	Alignment	
Aryeh Nehemkin	Alignment	
Shimon Peres	Alignment	
Yitzhak Rabin	Alignment	
Emri Ron	Alignment	
Daniel Rosolio	Alignment	
Yossi Sarid	Alignment	
Uri Sebag	Alignment	
Moshe Shahal	Alignment	
Victor Shem-Tov	Alignment	
Eliyahu Speiser	Alignment	
Rafael Suissa	Alignment	
Yair Tsaban	Alignment	
Ya'akov Tzur	Alignment	
Muhammed Wattad	Alignment	
Shevah Weiss	Alignment	
Gad Yaacobi	Alignment	
Yehezkel Zakai	Alignment	
Dov Zakin	Alignment	
Eliezer Avtabi	National Religious Party	
Yehuda Ben-Meir	National Religious Party	Left party to establish Gesher – Zionist Religious Centre, before returning
Yosef Burg	National Religious Party	
Haim Drukman	National Religious Party	Left party to sit as an independent
Zevulun Hammer	National Religious Party	Left party to establish Gesher – Zionist Religious Centre, before returning
Avraham Melamed	National Religious Party	
Shmuel Halpert	Agudat Yisrael	
Shlomo Lorincz	Agudat Yisrael	
Menachem Porush	Agudat Yisrael	
Avraham Yosef Shapira	Agudat Yisrael	
Charlie Biton	Hadash	
Tawfik Toubi	Hadash	
Meir Vilner	Hadash	
Tawfiq Ziad	Hadash	
Geula Cohen	Tehiya	
Yuval Ne'eman	Tehiya	
Hanan Porat	Tehiya	
Aharon Abuhatzira	Tami	
Ben-Zion Rubin	Tami	
Aharon Uzan	Tami	
Moshe Dayan	Telem	
Mordechai Ben-Porat	Telem	Left party to establish the Movement for the Renewal of Social Zionism
Amnon Rubinstein	Shinui	
Mordechai Virshubski	Shinui	
Shulamit Aloni	Ratz	Party merged into the Alignment, but later split again

=== Replacements ===
MK	Replaced	Date	Party	Notes
Yigal Hurvitz	Moshe Dayan	16 October 1981	Telem	Hurvitz left Telem to establish Rafi
Edna Solodar	Moshe Harif	16 January 1982	Alignment	
Michael Kleiner	Moshe Arens	19 January 1982	Likud	
Ariel Weinstein	David Shiffman	18 October 1982	Likud	
Nahman Raz	Chaim Herzog	22 March 1983	Alignment	Herzog was elected President
Haim Ramon	Daniel Rosolio	16 March 1983	Alignment	
Avraham Hirschson	Simha Erlich	19 June 1983	Likud	
Zvi Shiloah	Hanan Porat	7 March 1984	Tehiya	
