= Israeli Labor Party =

Israeli political party (1968–2024)

Israeli Labor Party מפלגת העבודה הישראלית حزب العمل
- Leader: Levi Eshkol (first); Yair Golan (last)
- Founded: 23 January 1968; 58 years ago
- Dissolved: 12 July 2024; 2 years ago (de facto)
- Merger of: Mapai; Ahdut HaAvoda; Rafi
- Merged into: The Democrats
- Headquarters: Tel Aviv
- Youth wing: Israeli Young Labor
- Membership (2024): 48,288
- Ideology: Social democracy; Labor Zionism
- Political position: Centre-left
- National affiliation: Alignment (1968–1991); One Israel (1999–2001); Zionist Union (2014–2019)
- European affiliation: Party of European Socialists (observer)
- International affiliation: Progressive Alliance; Socialist International (until 2018)
- Colours: Red, blue
- Most MKs: 49 (1969–1973)
- Fewest MKs: 3 (2020–2021)

Election symbol
- אמת أ‌م‌ت

Website
- havoda.org.il

The Israeli Labor Party (Hebrew: מפלגת העבודה הישראלית, romanized: Mifleget HaAvoda HaYisraelit), commonly known in Israel as HaAvoda (Hebrew: העבודה, lit. 'The Labor'), was a Labor Zionist and social democratic political party in Israel. It was established in 1968 through the merger of three Labor Zionist political parties: Mapai, Ahdut HaAvoda and Rafi. Until 1977, all Israeli prime ministers were affiliated with the Labor Party or its predecessors.

The party supported the welfare state and maintained close links with Israeli trade unions. It was associated with advocating for an Israeli–Palestinian peace process based on a two-state solution, pragmatic foreign policy positions, and social-democratic economic policies. The party was also characterized as secular and progressive. The party was a member of Socialist International until July 2018, after which it joined the Progressive Alliance. The party was also an observer member of the Party of European Socialists.

On 30 June 2024, under the leadership of Yair Golan, who had been elected party leader on 28 May 2024, the party agreed to merge with Meretz to form a new political party, The Democrats. The merger agreement provided for one Meretz representative in every four positions on the new party's electoral list and party bodies, with additional representation for Meretz's municipal factions. The merger was ratified by delegates of both Labor and Meretz on 12 July 2024. Under the terms of the agreement, Labor and Meretz continue to function as separate corporate and budgetary entities, and their factions in the Histadrut, municipal councils, and other bodies outside the Knesset remain distinct while cooperating.

== History ==
=== Foundation and political dominance (1965–1977) ===
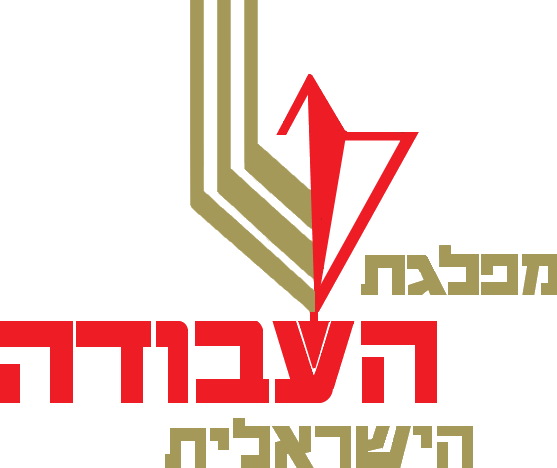
Original logo of the party from the 1980s

==== First Alignment ====
The foundations for the Israeli Labor Party were established shortly before the 1965 Knesset elections, when Mapai—the largest political party in Israel and the dominant partner in every government since the state's founding in 1948—and its affiliated Arab satellite lists formed an alliance with Ahdut HaAvoda, another Labor Zionist party. The alliance was intended to strengthen Mapai's electoral position following the departure of eight Knesset members led by former prime minister David Ben-Gurion, who established the new party Rafi after disputes including Mapai's refusal to support a change in the electoral system that he had favored.

The alliance between Mapai and Ahdut HaAvoda, known as the Labor Alignment (or retrospectively the First Alignment), won 45 seats in the 1965 elections. It formed a governing coalition with the National Religious Party, Mapam, the Independent Liberals, Poalei Agudat Yisrael, Progress and Development and Cooperation and Brotherhood. Following the Six-Day War in 1967, Rafi and Gahal also joined the coalition.

==== Merger and coalition with Mapam ====
On 23 January 1968 Mapai, Ahdut HaAvoda, and Rafi (excluding Ben-Gurion, who established the National List in protest) merged to create the Israeli Labor Party. On 28 January 1969, the party entered into an alliance with Mapam, which also came to be known as the Alignment.

As the larger faction in the second Alignment, Labor became the dominant partner. During the 1970s, successive Alignment-led governments expanded the welfare state. This included increases in pension benefits and the introduction of new social security schemes such as disability insurance and unemployment insurance (1970), children's insurance (1975), and vacation pay for adopting parents (1976). Other initiatives included a Family Allowance for Veterans (1970), a benefit for Prisoners of Zion (1973), and mobility and volunteer benefits (1975). Between 1975 and 1976, a limited housing rehabilitation program was introduced in several older neighborhoods, and the Sick Leave Compensation Law of 1976 was enacted to provide compensation for employees absent from work due to illness.

=== Opposition and comeback (1977–2001) ===
Following the 1977 Israeli legislative election, the Labor Party entered the opposition for the first time. After the 1984 election, in which the Independent Liberals participated as part of the Alignment, the Alignment joined a national unity government with Likud, the National Religious Party, Agudat Yisrael, Shas, Morasha, Shinui, and Ometz. Under the coalition agreement, the office of prime minister alternated between the Alignment and Likud. Shortly afterwards, Mapam left the Alignment in opposition to Shimon Peres’s decision to join the unity government with Likud.

On 16 July 1991, the Labor Party voted to stop using the Alignment name effective from the 18th. The party's secretary-general, Michael Harish, explained that the name became useless after Mapam's departure, and that the Labor Party's own name was much more meaningful. At this time, the Likud-led government elected in 1988 faced several challenges, including economic difficulties, the integration of large numbers of immigrants from the former Soviet Union, strained relations with the administration of U.S. President George H. W. Bush, and internal divisions.

Party logo adopted in 1992, which was used until 2016

Led again by Yitzhak Rabin, Labor won the 1992 elections and formed a government with Meretz and Shas. The Labor-led government introduced a range of social policy measures. These included expanded provisions for single parents and people with disabilities, liberalization of income support entitlements, and the 1994 Law to Reduce Poverty and Income Inequality, extended a year later, which increased income maintenance grants to low-income families. In 1995, a national health insurance policy was enacted. Other measures included reforms to make national insurance contributions more progressive, the introduction of a maternity grant for adopting mothers, old-age insurance for housewives, a minimum unemployment allowance, and a partial injury allowance. Additional investments were made in development projects, while affirmative action programs were implemented to increase the employment of Palestinian citizens in the public sector. The Ministry of Interior increased funding for Arab local councils, and the Ministry of Education expanded budgets for Arab education.

The party's subsequent role was closely linked to the Oslo Accords. The accords were approved by the Knesset in a vote of confidence that passed 61–50, with eight abstentions. Several members of the governing coalition declined to support the agreement, but it was secured with the backing of Palestinian-Arab parties in the Knesset. The government proceeded to implement the accords. Rabin's decision to advance negotiations with the Palestinians and sign the Oslo Accords led to his assassination in 1995 by right-wing Jewish extremist Yigal Amir.

Following Rabin's assassination, Shimon Peres became prime minister and called early elections in 1996 to seek a mandate for advancing the peace process. Although Labor won the most seats in the Knesset, Peres lost the direct election for prime minister to Benjamin Netanyahu, after a series of suicide bombings by Hamas. Netanyahu and Likud subsequently formed the government.

==== One Israel ====
In 1999, as his coalition weakened, Netanyahu called early elections. Labor, now led by Ehud Barak, formed an electoral alliance with Meimad and Gesher under the name One Israel. Barak won the prime minister election, while One Israel won 26 Knesset seats. He established a coalition of 75 members with Shas, Meretz, Yisrael BaAliyah, the National Religious Party, and United Torah Judaism. The coalition with religious parties (NRP, Shas, and UTJ) caused tensions with the secularist Meretz, who quit the coalition after a disagreement with Shas over the authority of the Deputy Education Minister. Other parties subsequently left before the 2000 Camp David summit.

=== Decline (2001–2018) ===
Following the October 2000 protests in Israel and the outbreak of the Second Intifada, Prime Minister Barak resigned in December 2000. In a subsequent special election for prime minister, he was defeated by Likud leader Ariel Sharon. Labor remained in Sharon's coalition, which included Likud, Shas, Yisrael BaAliyah, and United Torah Judaism, and received two key cabinet positions: Shimon Peres was appointed Minister of Foreign Affairs and Binyamin Ben-Eliezer became Defense Minister. Labor supported Operation Defensive Shield against Palestinians in the West Bank in April 2002. Amid criticism that Peres and Ben-Eliezer were subordinate to Sharon and not advancing peace efforts, Labor withdrew from the government in 2003.

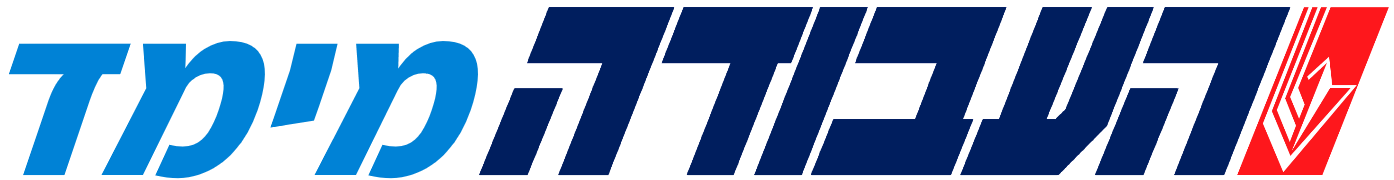
Logo of the Labor-Meimad List during the 2003 election

Ahead of the 2003 elections, Amram Mitzna led the party on a platform that included unilateral withdrawal from the Gaza Strip. Labor won 19 seats, its lowest result to that point, while Likud won 38. Following internal opposition, Mitzna resigned as leader and was succeeded by Peres. Labor later joined Sharon's coalition to support the plan for Israeli disengagement from the Gaza Strip, after the National Union and National Religious Party had left the government.

On 8 November 2005, Shimon Peres was replaced as the leader of the Labor party by the election of left-wing Histadrut union leader Amir Peretz in an internal Labor party ballot. Critics of Labor have argued that, over the years, the party had abandoned its socialist heritage in favor of economic and business elites, and had passed the mantle of custodian of the underprivileged to right-wing and religious parties. Peretz stated his intention to reassert Labor's traditional socialist policies, and took the party out of the government. This prompted Sharon to resign and call for new elections in March 2006. Prior to the election, the political map had been redrawn, as Sharon and the majority of Likud's MKs, together with a number of Labor MKs, including Shimon Peres, and some from other parties, had formed the new political party Kadima. In the elections Labor won 19 seats, making it the second largest party after Kadima. It joined Ehud Olmert's Kadima-led government, with Peretz appointed Defense Minister. Labor's main coalition demand and campaign promise was raising the minimum wage.

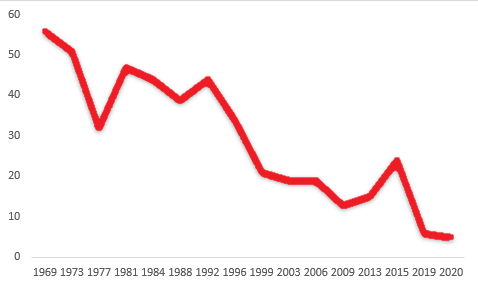
Seats held by the Labor party since its founding

On 28 May 2007, a leadership election resulted in Ehud Barak and Ami Ayalon defeating Peretz who was pushed into third place. In the run-off election (required as neither Barak nor Ayalon received over 40% of the vote), Barak was re-elected as party chairman. Despite stating that he would withdraw the party from the government unless Olmert resigned, Barak remained in government and took over as Defense Minister. Prior to the 2009 elections Labor and Meimad ended their alliance, with Meimad ultimately running a joint list with the Green Movement (which did not pass the electoral threshold). Several prominent members left the party, including Ami Ayalon, and Efraim Sneh (who formed Yisrael Hazaka). In the elections, Labor was reduced to just 13 seats, making it the fourth largest party behind Kadima, Likud and Yisrael Beiteinu.

Analysing the downfall of the once dominant political party in Israel, Efraim Inbar of the Begin-Sadat Center for Strategic Studies points to several factors. By forfeiting identification with the establishment and building of the State of Israel, symbolised by a predilection for military service and by the settling of the land of Israel, Labor lost its most important asset. Deserting the Zionist symbol of Jerusalem, by showing willingness to cede part of it to the Palestinians was an ill-fated move. Their association with the Oslo Accords meant that they could not avoid being discredited by its failure. Demographic factors have worked against Labor, as the growing Sefardi population, as well as the recent Russian-Jewish immigrants, have largely voted for other parties. Attempts to gain the support of the Israeli Arab voters have damaged the image of the party, and yielded no harvest.

On 17 January 2011, disillusionment with party leader Ehud Barak, over his support for coalition policies, especially regarding the peace process, led to Barak's resignation from the Labor Party with four other Knesset members to establish a new "centrist, Zionist and democratic" party, Independence. Following this move, all Labor Party government ministers resigned. Two days after the split, a group of prominent members of Israel's business, technology, and cultural communities including Jerusalem Venture Partners founder Erel Margalit founded the "Avoda Now" movement calling for a revival of the Labor Party. The movement launched a public campaign calling the people to support the Labor Party, with the aim of renewing its institutions, restore its social values, and choose new dynamic leadership.

Shelly Yachimovich was elected leader in 2011 saying "I promise that we will work together. This is just the beginning of a new start for Israeli society." She was congratulated by many in the party including her one-time rival Amir Peretz. Yachimovich was replaced as leader by Isaac Herzog in 2013. In the 2013 legislative election held on 22 January 2013, Labor received 11.39% of the national vote, winning 15 seats.

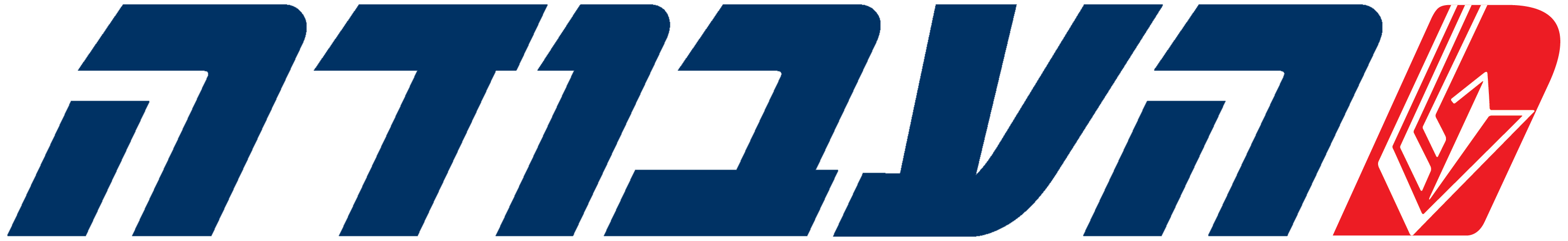
Leaning version of the later party logo, adopted in 2016

On 10 December 2014, party leader Isaac Herzog and Tzipi Livni, leader and founder of the Hatnuah party, announced an electoral alliance to contest the upcoming legislative election. In the 2015 legislative election on 7 March 2015, the joint list Zionist Union received 24 seats in the Knesset, of which 19 belong to the Labor Party. Both parties remained independent parties while both represented by the Zionist Union faction in the Knesset. The partnership continued after Avi Gabbay was elected chairman of the party on 10 July 2017, until 1 January 2019, when Gabbay announced the dissolution of the union unilaterally. On 10 July 2018, the Labor Party suspended its membership of the Socialist International after the international adopted a policy of BDS towards Israel.

=== Final years and merger with Meretz (2019–2024) ===
Labor's support collapsed in the April 2019 legislative election, being reduced to only 4.43% of votes and 6 seats, marking it as the worst result in the party's history. Anger at Gabbay intensified, with poor election results, and negotiating with the right to join a Netanyahu-led government. Longtime party member Peretz criticized Gabbay, tweeting "We will not enter or sit in his [Netanyahu] government. Every other option is a violation of everything we promised to the public". Gabbay resigned in June. In July 2019, Amir Peretz was elected as the new leader of the Labor party. A few weeks later, on 18 July 2019, ahead of the September 2019 election, Amir Peretz merged the party with the Gesher party, giving Gesher multiple spots on Labor's candidate list.

On 12 January 2020, Labor announced that it was negotiating a joint list with Meretz to prevent the possibility of either party not making the electoral threshold and not entering the Knesset. Labor and Meretz announced a joint run on 13 January 2020, with the Labor party central committee voting in favor of ratification of the alliance the following day. Meretz approved the alliance on 14 January. The alliance submitted its list on 15 January under the name Labor-Gesher-Meretz. In March 2020, Gesher's only MK Orly Levy announced that she was splitting from the union due to their support of Benny Gantz's efforts to set up a minority government with the Joint List, with him as prime minister. Gantz later abandoned that effort and instead joined a "national unity coronavirus government" headed by Benjamin Netanyahu. After repeatedly promising not to join a government headed by Netanyahu, Peretz decided to bring Labor into that coalition headed by Netanyahu to "promote social justice" along with Gantz.

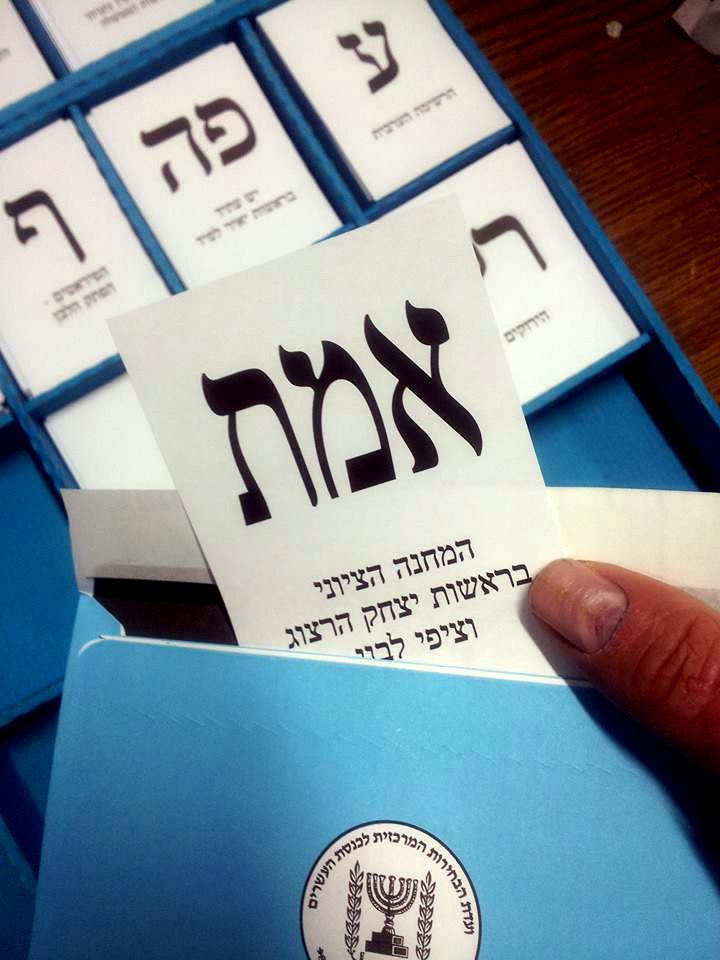
Israeli Labor Party ballot slip – "Emet" which translates to "Truth" in Hebrew

On 22 April 2020, it was announced that Labor Party leader Amir Peretz would serve as Israel's Economic Minister as a result of a coalition agreement which was made following the 2020 Israeli legislative election and will coordinate with Blue and White on parliamentary matters and policy issues. Despite agreeing to join the new government, Peretz also stated that he and other Labor MKs will still vote against a proposed West Bank annexation plan. On 26 April 2020, 64.2% of the Labor Party's 3,840 central committee members approved of Peretz's decision to join the new government. During the coalition talks, the party was under negotiations with Blue and White to implement a merger. On 17 May 2020, Peretz was officially sworn in at the new Israeli economic minister. Labor member Itzik Shmuli also joined the Israeli government after being sworn in as Israel's Minister of Welfare.

Peretz decided to not run for re-election in the 2021 election and also resigned as leader. In the consequent leadership election, Merav Michaeli (who did not join the Netanyahu government) was elected leader. Labor, which was struggling to cross the threshold in polls taken before Michaeli became leader, increased their share of seats to 7. The party subsequently joined the new government. Michaeli was re-elected leader ahead of the 2022 election. This was the first time the party re-elected its leader since primaries were held starting in 1992. In the 2022 elections the party was reduced to four seats and winning 3.69% of the votes. In December 2023, Michaeli announced her intention to step down as Labor leader. The following February, a leadership election was called for 28 May, which Yair Golan won on a platform of merging the party with the rival Meretz party. On 30 June 2024, an agreement between Labor and Meretz was signed to merge the parties and form The Democrats, which was approved by the newly elected party delegates on 12 July.

Despite the merger, members of The Democrats are identified in the 25th Knesset as members of the Labor Party, following an unsuccessful attempt to rename the Knesset faction.

== Ideology and platform ==
=== Past ===
Mapai evolved from the socialist Poale Zion movement and adhered to the Socialist Zionist ideology promulgated by Nahum Syrkin and Ber Borochov. Under Ben-Gurion's leadership (1930–1954), Mapai focused mainly on a Zionist agenda, as establishing a homeland for the Jewish people was seen as the most urgent issue.

After the founding of the state of Israel, Mapai engaged in nation building—the establishment of the Israel Defense Forces (while dismantling every other armed group), the establishment of many settlements, the settling of more than 1,000,000 Jewish immigrants and the desire to unite all the inhabitants of Israel under a new Zionist Jewish Israeli culture (an ideology known as the "Melting pot" כור היתוך).

Labor in the past was more hawkish on security and defense issues than it is now. During its years in office, Israel fought the 1956 Sinai War, the Six-Day War and the Yom Kippur War.

=== 21st century ===
While originally a democratic socialist party, Labor evolved into a programme that supported a mixed economy with strong social welfare programmes. In November 2005, Amir Peretz, leader of the social-democratic One Nation which had merged into Labor after a split in 1999, was elected chairman of the party, defeating Shimon Peres. Under Peretz, especially in the 2006 electoral campaign, the party took a significant ideological turn, putting social and economic issues on top of its agenda, and advocating a social democratic approach (including increases in minimum wage and social security payments), in sharp contrast to the economically liberal policies led by former Finance Minister Benjamin Netanyahu. In the post–Cold War era, the party's foreign policy retained a strong orientation toward the United States (especially the Democratic Party), and its security policy maintained that a permanent peace with the Palestinians can only be based on agreements that are enforceable. Labor supported a two-state solution and the creation of an independent, demilitarized Palestinian state.

On social issues, Labor supported same-sex marriage, the legalisation of cannabis, advancing surrogacy rights for gay couples and organized public transportation on Shabbat. Labor was committed to the continued existence of Israel as a Jewish and democratic state. It believed in maintaining a strong defense force and also supports the promotion of individual human rights. It supported most Supreme Court decisions on the latter issue, as well as the adoption of a written constitution that would entrench human rights. The party opposed the Nation State Bill in 2018, and after its passing pledged to adding a clause emphasising equality for all citizens.

== Party leaders ==
No.	Image	Leader	Took office	Left office	Prime ministerial tenure	Knesset elections	Elected/reelected as leader
1		Levi Eshkol	1968	1969	1963–1969	1965 (as leader of Mapai)	1965 (Mapai)
2		Golda Meir	1969	1974	1969–1974	1969, 1973	1969
3		Yitzhak Rabin	1974	1977	1974–1977		1974, 1977 (Feb)
4		Shimon Peres	1977	1992	1984–1986	1977, 1981, 1984, 1988	1977 (Apr), 1980, 1984
(3)		Yitzhak Rabin	1992	1995	1992–1995	1992	1992
(4)		Shimon Peres	1995	1997	1995–1996	1996	1995
5		Ehud Barak	1997	2001	1999–2001	1999	1997
6		Binyamin Ben-Eliezer	2001	2002			2001
7		Amram Mitzna	2002	2003		2003	2002
(4)		Shimon Peres (interim)	2003	2005			2003
8		Amir Peretz	2005	2007		2006	2005
(5)		Ehud Barak	2007	2011		2009	2007
—		Michael Harish (acting)	2011	2011			
9		Shelly Yachimovich	2011	2013		2013	2011
10		Isaac Herzog	2013	2017		2015	2013
11		Avi Gabbay	2017	2019		2019 (Apr)	2017
(8)		Amir Peretz	2019	2021		2019 (Sep), 2020	2019
12		Merav Michaeli	2021	2024		2021, 2022	2021, 2022
13		Yair Golan	2024	2024			2024

=== Leadership election process ===
The rules adopted in 1963 by the preceding Mapai party for electing leaders saw the party's leader elected by a vote of its Central Committee. This initially remained the case with the Labor Party when it succeeded Mapai. Beginning with the 1977 leadership election, the party shifted to electing its leaders by a vote of the party's convention delegates. Following Rabin's resignation, only months after the February 1977 leadership election, the party opted against holding another convention vote, and instead selected Peres as its new leader by a vote of its Central Committee. A vote of convention delegates was again used in the 1980 leadership election.

The party's 5th convention adopted a rule change that shifted the election of party leaders to a vote of the party's general membership. As a result, since 1992, Labor Party leaders have been chosen through party membership votes, aside from exceptional circumstances. Exceptional circumstances arose after the November 1995 assassination of Rabin, which saw the a vote of the party's Central Committee used to install Peres as the party's new leader. Exceptional circumstances again arose in 2003, when an internal vote of the party's Central Committee was used to select Shimon Peres to serve as they party's interim leader until a later vote for a new permanent leader.

== Other prominent members ==
Prominent former members include:

- Yigal Allon – Acting Prime-Minister
- Moshe Dayan – Defense Minister
- Abba Eban – Minister of Foreign Affairs
- Chaim Herzog – President of Israel
- Isaac Herzog – President of Israel
- Efraim Katzir – President of Israel
- Yitzhak Navon – President of Israel
- Zalman Shazar – President of Israel
- Ezer Weizman – President of Israel

== Election results ==
=== Knesset ===
Election	Leader	Votes	%	Seats	+/–	Government
1969	Golda Meir	Part of Alignment		49 / 120		Coalition (1969)
1969	Golda Meir	Part of Alignment		49 / 120		Coalition (1969–1974)
1973	Golda Meir	Part of Alignment		44 / 120	▼5	Coalition (1974)
1973	Golda Meir	Part of Alignment		44 / 120	▼5	Coalition (1974–1977)
1977	Shimon Peres	Part of Alignment		28 / 120	▼16	Opposition
1981	Shimon Peres	Part of Alignment		40 / 120	▲12	Opposition
1984	Shimon Peres	Part of Alignment		37 / 120	▼3	Coalition (1984–1986)
1984	Shimon Peres	Part of Alignment		37 / 120	▼3	Coalition (1986–1988)
1988 (Note: With Alignment as its only member)	Shimon Peres	685,363	30.02 (#2)	39 / 120	▲2	Coalition (1988–1990)
1988	Shimon Peres	685,363	30.02 (#2)	39 / 120	▲2	Opposition (1990–1992)
1992	Yitzhak Rabin	906,810	34.65 (#1)	44 / 120	▲5	Coalition (1992–1995)
1992	Yitzhak Rabin	906,810	34.65 (#1)	44 / 120	▲5	Coalition (1995–1996)
1996	Shimon Peres	818,741	26.83 (#1)	34 / 120	▼10	Opposition
1999	Ehud Barak	Part of One Israel		23 / 120	▼11	Opposition (1999–2001)
1999	Ehud Barak	Part of One Israel		23 / 120	▼11	Coalition (2001–2002)
1999	Ehud Barak	Part of One Israel		23 / 120	▼11	Opposition (2002–2003)
2003 (Note: With Meimad)	Amram Mitzna	455,183	14.46 (#2)	18 / 120	▼5	Opposition (2003–2005)
2003	Amram Mitzna	455,183	14.46 (#2)	18 / 120	▼5	Coalition (2005)
2003	Amram Mitzna	455,183	14.46 (#2)	18 / 120	▼5	Opposition (2005–2006)
2006	Amir Peretz	472,366	15.06 (#2)	18 / 120	Steady	Coalition
2009	Ehud Barak	334,900	9.93 (#4)	13 / 120	▼5	Coalition (2009–2011)
2009	Ehud Barak	334,900	9.93 (#4)	13 / 120	▼5	Opposition (2011–2013)
2013	Shelly Yachimovich	432,118	11.39 (#3)	15 / 120	▲2	Opposition
2015	Isaac Herzog	Part of Zionist Union		19 / 120	▲4	Opposition
Apr 2019	Avi Gabbay	190,870	4.43 (#6)	6 / 120	▼13	Snap election
Sep 2019 (Note: With Gesher)	Amir Peretz	212,782	4.80 (#9)	5 / 120	▼1	Snap election
2020	Amir Peretz	Part of Labor-Gesher-Meretz		3 / 120	▼2	Coalition (2020–2021) (Note: Labor MKs Amir Peretz and Itzik Shmuli joined while MK Merav Michaeli did not.)
2021	Merav Michaeli	268,737	6.09 (#6)	7 / 120	▲4	Coalition
2022	Merav Michaeli	175,922	3.69 (#10)	4 / 120	▼3	Opposition

=== Prime minister ===
Election	Candidate	Votes	%	Result
1996	Shimon Peres	1,471,566	49.5 (#2)	Lost
1999	Ehud Barak	1,791,020	56.1 (#1)	Won
2001	Ehud Barak	1,023,944	37.6 (#2)	Lost

== Knesset members ==
Knesset	Members	Total
7 (1969–1974)	Aharon Becker, Eliyahu Sasson, Ze'ev Sherf, Ya'akov Shimshon Shapira, Yitzhak Ben-Aharon, Mordechai Ben-Porat, Mordechai Bibi, Shimon Peres, Mordechai Ofer (replaced by Moshe Shahal 1 September 1971), Pinchas Sapir, Avraham Ofer, Yitzhak Navon, Moshe Dayan, Reuven Barkat, Yigal Allon, Yosef Almogi, Shoshana Arbeli-Almozlino, Moshe Baram, Menachem Cohen, David Coren, Yitzhak Coren, Adiel Amorai, Ari Ankorion, Abba Eban, Aryeh Eliav, Ada Feinberg-Sireni, Yisrael Galili, Uzi Feinerman, Zina Harman, Ze'ev Herring, Shlomo Hillel, Yisrael Kargman, Shalom Levin, Zvi Dinstein, Moshe Carmel, Yisrael Yeshayahu, Gad Yaacobi, Haim Yosef Zadok, Avraham Zilberberg, Mathilda Guez, Zvi Guershoni, Yizhar Harari, Mordechai Zar, Aharon Yadlin, Ben-Zion Halfon, Golda Meir, Haim Gvati, Mordechai Surkis, Yehonatan Yifrah, Moshe Wertman	50 (part of Alignment)
8 (1973–1977)	Yigal Allon, Yosef Almogi, Adiel Amorai, Ari Ankorion, Shoshana Arbeli-Almozlino, Moshe Baram, Yitzhak Ben-Aharon, Mordechai Ben-Porat (Left party to sit as an independent), Moshe Carmel, David Coren, Moshe Dayan, Abba Eban, Aryeh Eliav (Left party to sit as an independent, before establishing Ya'ad – Civil Rights Movement and then forming the Independent Socialist Faction), Uzi Feinerman (replaced by Amos Hadar 8 April 1974), Yisrael Galili, Avraham Givelber, Zvi Guershoni (replaced by Senetta Yoseftal 1 September 1976), Mathilda Guez, Menachem Hacohen, Ben-Zion Halfon, Michael Harish, Esther Herlitz, Shlomo Hillel, Yisrael Kargman, Nuzhat Katzav, Shalom Levin, Golda Meir (replaced by Jacques Amir 10 June 1974), Eliyahu Moyal, Ora Namir, Yitzhak Navon, Avraham Ofer (replaced by Yehiel Leket 3 January 1977), Shimon Peres, Yitzhak Rabin, Pinchas Sapir (replaced by Ya'akov Frank 12 August 1975), Yossi Sarid, Moshe Shahal, Moshe Wertman, Gad Yaacobi, Aharon Yadlin, Aviad Yafeh, Aharon Yariv (replaced by Zvi Alderoti 16 May 1977), Yisrael Yeshayahu, Haim Yosef Zadok, Avraham Zilberberg, Haviv Shimoni (replaced Abd el-Aziz el-Zoubi of the Mapam, 14 February 1974)	44 (part of Alignment)
9 (1977–1981)	Yigal Allon (replaced by Yehuda Hashai 29 February 1980), Jacques Amir, Adiel Amorai, Shoshana Arbeli-Almozlino, Haim Bar-Lev, Uzi Baram, Moshe Dayan (Left party to sit as an independent before establishing Telem), Abba Eban, Tamar Eshel, Menachem Hacohen, Amos Hadar, Michael Harish, Shlomo Hillel, Yeruham Meshel, Eliyahu Moyal, Ora Namir, Yitzhak Navon (replaced by Avraham Katz-Oz 18 April 1978), Shimon Peres, Yitzhak Rabin, Yehoshua Rabinovitz (replaced by Esther Herlitz 14 August 1979), Daniel Rosolio, Yossi Sarid, Moshe Shahal, Eliyahu Speiser, Gad Yaacobi, Aharon Yadlin (replaced by Ze'ev Katz 12 January 1979), Yehezkel Zakai, Haim Yosef Zadok (replaced by Emri Ron of Mapam)	28 (part of the Alignment)
10 (1981–1984)	Jacques Amir, Adiel Amorai, Nava Arad, Shoshana Arbeli-Almozlino, Haim Bar-Lev, Michael Bar-Zohar, Uzi Baram, Dov Ben-Meir, Naftali Blumenthal, Abba Eban, Rafael Edri, Tamar Eshel, Ya'akov Gil, Mordechai Gur, Menachem Hacohen, Aharon Harel, Moshe Harif (replaced by Edna Solodar 16 January 1982), Michael Harish, Yehuda Hashai, Chaim Herzog (replaced by Nahman Raz 22 March 1983), Shlomo Hillel, Avraham Katz-Oz, Hamad Khalaily Yeruham Meshel, Aharon Nahmias, Ra'anan Naim, Ora Namir, Aryeh Nehemkin, Shimon Peres, Yitzhak Rabin, Daniel Rosolio (replaced by Haim Ramon 16 March 1983), Yossi Sarid, Uri Sebag, Moshe Shahal, Eliyahu Speiser, Rafael Suissa, Ya'akov Tzur, Shevah Weiss, Gad Yaacobi, Yehezkel Zakai	40 (part of Alignment)
11 (1984–1988)	Jacques Amir, Adiel Amorai (replaced by Uri Sebag 31 October 1988), Nava Arad, Shoshana Arbeli-Almozlino, Yitzhak Artzi, Haim Bar-Lev, Uzi Baram, Dov Ben-Meir, Abdulwahab Darawshe (Left party to sit as an independent, before forming the Arab Democratic Party), Simcha Dinitz (replaced by Ya'akov Gil 13 March 1988), Abba Eban, Rafael Edri, Mordechai Gur, Menachem Hacohen, Aharon Harel (replaced by Avraham Shochat 10 May 1988), Michael Harish, Shlomo Hillel, Avraham Katz-Oz, Yisrael Kessar, David Libai, Amnon Linn, Aharon Nahmias, Ora Namir, Yitzhak Navon, Aryeh Nehemkin, Shimon Peres, Yitzhak Peretz, Yitzhak Rabin, Haim Ramon, Nahman Raz, Yossi Sarid (Left party to join Ratz), Moshe Shahal, Efraim Shalom, Edna Solodar, Eliyahu Speiser, Ya'akov Tzur, Shevah Weiss, Gad Yaacobi	38 (as part of the Alignment, Mapam leaves Alignment following election)
12 (1988–1992)	Nava Arad, Shoshana Arbeli-Almozlino, Haim Bar-Lev, Michael Bar-Zohar, Uzi Baram, Yossi Beilin, Binyamin Ben-Eliezer, Eli Ben-Menachem, Avraham Burg, Ra'anan Cohen, Eli Dayan, Rafael Edri, Aryeh Eliav, Gedalia Gal, Micha Goldman, Efraim Gur (Left party to establish the Unity for Peace and Immigration, which merged into Likud), Mordechai Gur, Michael Harish, Shlomo Hillel, Avraham Katz-Oz (replaced by Pini Shomer 28 May 1996), Yisrael Kessar, David Libai, Nawaf Massalha, Hagai Meirom, Ora Namir, Yitzhak Navon, Shimon Peres, Amir Peretz, Yitzhak Rabin, Haim Ramon, Moshe Shahal, Shimon Shetreet, Avraham Shochat, Edna Solodar, Ya'akov Tzur, Shevah Weiss, Ezer Weizman, Gad Yaacobi, Emanuel Zisman	39 (Alignment dissolved and renamed Labor Party)
13 (1992–1996)	Shmuel Avital, Uzi Baram, Yossi Beilin, Binyamin Ben-Eliezer, Eli Ben-Menachem, Shlomo Bohbot, Avraham Burg (replaced by Haneh Hadad 5 July 1995), Ra'anan Cohen, Eli Dayan, Yael Dayan, Rafael Edri, Rafi Elul, Gedalia Gal, Micha Goldman, Eli Goldschmidt, Mordechai Gur (replaced by Avraham Katz-Oz 16 July 1995), Michael Harish, Dalia Itzik, Avigdor Kahalani (Left party to establish the Third Way), Yossi Katz, Yisrael Kessar, Yoram Lass, David Libai, Masha Lubelsky, Nawaf Massalha, Hagai Meirom, Ora Namir, Ori Orr, Shimon Peres, Amir Peretz, Yitzhak Rabin (replaced by Nava Arad 5 November 1995, left Labor to sit as Independent in 1996), Haim Ramon, Gideon Sagi, Moshe Shahal, Ya'akov Shefi, Shimon Shetreet, Avraham Shochat, Efraim Sneh, Salah Tarif, Yosef Vanunu, Shevah Weiss, Avraham Yehezkel, Emanuel Zisman (Left party to establish the Third Way), Nissim Zvili	44
14 (1996–1997)	Adisu Massala (Left party to establish One Nation), Amir Peretz (Left party to establish One Nation), Avraham Shochat, Avraham Yehezkel, Binyamin Ben-Eliezer, Dalia Itzik, David Libai (Replaced by Eitan Cabel on 15 October 1996), Efi Oshaya, Efraim Sneh, Ehud Barak, Eli Ben-Menachem, Eli Goldschmidt, Hagai Meirom (Left party to establish Centre Party), Haim Ramon, Micha Goldman, Moshe Shahal (Replaced by Rafik Haj Yahia on 20 March 1998), Nawaf Massalha, Nissim Zvili (Left party to establish Centre Party), Ophir Pines-Paz, Ori Orr, Ra'anan Cohen, Rafael Edri, Rafi Elul, Saleh Tarif, Shalom Simhon, Shevah Weiss, Shimon Peres, Shlomo Ben-Ami, Sofa Landver, Uzi Baram, Yael Dayan, Yona Yahav, Yossi Beilin, Yossi Katz	34
15 (1999–2003)	Ehud Barak (Resigned from Knesset and replaced by Eitan Cabel on 9 March 2001), Shimon Peres, Shlomo Ben-Ami (Resigned from Knesset and replaced by Orit Noked on 11 August 2002), Yossi Beilin (Resigned from Knesset and replaced by Eli Ben-Menachem on 17 November 1999), Matan Vilnai (Resigned from Knesset and replaced by Colette Avital on 17 November 1999), Avraham Burg, Ra'anan Cohen (Resigned from Knesset and replaced by Tzali Reshef on 21 August 2002), Uzi Baram (Resigned from Knesset and replaced by Efi Oshaya on 15 February 2001), Dalia Itzik, Binyamin Ben-Eliezer, Haim Ramon, Eli Goldschmidt (Resigned from Knesset and replaced by Mordechai Mishani of Gesher on 15 February 2001), Avraham Shochat, Yael Dayan, Ophir Pines-Paz, Efraim Sneh, Nawaf Massalha, Avraham Yehezkel, Sofa Landver, Salah Tarif, Shalom Simhon, Yossi Katz, Weizman Shiri	22 (as part of One Israel)
16th (2003–2006)	Amram Mitzna (Replaced by Salah Tarif on 23 February 2005, who was replaced by Ronen Tzur on 22 January 2006), Binyamin Ben-Eliezer, Shimon Peres (Replaced by Wizman Shiry on 17 January 2006 when he left to join Kadima), Matan Vilnai, Avraham Burg (Replaced by Raleb Majadele on 28 June 2004), Dalia Itzik (Replaced by Avraham Yehezkel on 17 January 2006 when she left to join Kadima and then Dani Koren on 28 January 2006), Ophir Pines-Paz, Efraim Sneh, Yuli Tamir, Isaac Herzog, Haim Ramon (Replaced by Efi Oshaya on 18 January 2006 when he left to join Kadima and then by Tova Ilan of Meimad on 21 January 2006), Danny Yatom, Eitan Cabel, Avraham Shochat (Replaced by Sofa Landver on 11 January 2006 and then Orna Angel on 8 February 2006 and then Neta Dobrin on 15 February 2006), Colette Avital, Shalom Simhon, Orit Noked, Eli Ben-Menachem	18 (as part of Labor-Meimad)
17 (2006–2009)	Amir Peretz, Isaac Herzog, Ophir Pines-Paz, Avishay Braverman, Yuli Tamir, Ami Ayalon (Joined Meimad in November 2008), Eitan Cabel, Binyamin Ben-Eliezer, Shelly Yachimovich, Matan Vilnai, Colette Avital, Nadia Hilou, Shalom Simhon, Orit Noked, Yoram Marciano, Raleb Majadele, Efriam Sneh (replaced by Shakhiv Shana'an on 28 May 2008 when he left the Knesset to form his own party), Danny Yatom (replaced by Leon Litinetsky on 30 June 2008)	18 (as part of Labor-Meimad)
18 (2009–2013)	Shelly Yachimovich, Isaac Herzog, Avishay Braverman, Eitan Cabel, Binyamin Ben-Eliezer, Daniel Ben-Simon, Raleb Majadele, Yoram Marciano, Ophir Pines-Paz (replaced by Einat Wilf on 10 January 2010. Wilf resigned from Labor in January 2011 to form the Independence Party), Ehud Barak (resigned from Labor in January 2011 to form the Independence Party) Matan Vilnai resigned from Labor in January 2011 to form the Independence Party), Shalom Simhon (resigned from Labor in January 2011 to form the Independence Party), Orit Noked resigned from Labor in January 2011 to form the Independence Party), Amir Peretz (replaced by Yoram Marciano on 9 December 2012 when Peretz resigned to join Hatnua)	13 (as Labor)
19 (2013–2015)	Shelly Yachimovich, Isaac Herzog, Eitan Cabel, Merav Michaeli, Yehiel Bar, Omer Bar-Lev, Stav Shaffir, Avishay Braverman, Erel Margalit, Itzik Shmuli, Mickey Rosenthal, Michal Biran, Nachman Shai, Moshe Mizrahi, Binyamin Ben-Eliezer (replaced by Raleb Majadele 14 December 2014)	15
20 (2015–2019)	Isaac Herzog (replaced by Robert Tiviaev of Hatnua 31 July 2018), Shelly Yachimovich, Stav Shaffir, Itzik Shmuli, Omer Bar-Lev, Yehiel Bar, Amir Peretz (rejoined the Labor Party from Hatnua), Merav Michaeli, Eitan Cabel, Mickey Rosenthal, Revital Swid, Eitan Broshi, Michal Biran, Nachman Shai, Ayelet Nahmias-Verbin, Yossi Yona, Saleh Saad (replaced Manuel Trajtenberg on 3 October 2017), Leah Fadida (replaced Erel Margalit 6 October 2017), Zouheir Bahloul (replaced by Moshe Mizrahi 18 October 2018), Danny Atar (replaced by Yael Cohen Paran of Hatnua on 25 November 2015)	19 (as part of Zionist Union)
21 (April–September 2019)	Avi Gabbay, Tal Russo, Itzik Shmuli, Shelly Yachimovich, Amir Peretz, Merav Michaeli (replaced by Stav Shaffir 1 August 2019)	6 (as Labor)
22 (September 2019 – 2020)	Amir Peretz, Itzik Shmuli, Merav Michaeli, Omer Bar-Lev, Revital Swid	5 (as part of Labor-Gesher)
23 (2020–2021)	Amir Peretz (replaced by Ilan Gilon of Meretz 28 January 2021), Itzik Shmuli, Merav Michaeli	3 (as part of Labor-Gesher-Meretz)
24 (2021–2022)	Merav Michaeli, Emilie Moatti, Gilad Kariv, Efrat Rayten, Ram Shefa, Ibtisam Mara'ana, Omer Bar-Lev (replaced by Naama Lazimi 22 June 2021 under Norwegian Law)	7 (as Labor)
25 (2022–present)	Merav Michaeli, Naama Lazimi, Gilad Kariv, Efrat Rayten	4 (as Labor)

== See also ==
- Israeli Labor Party primaries
