= 2011 Israeli Labor Party leadership election =

Israeli Labor Party leadership election

- 12–21 September 2011

vote by general membership of party
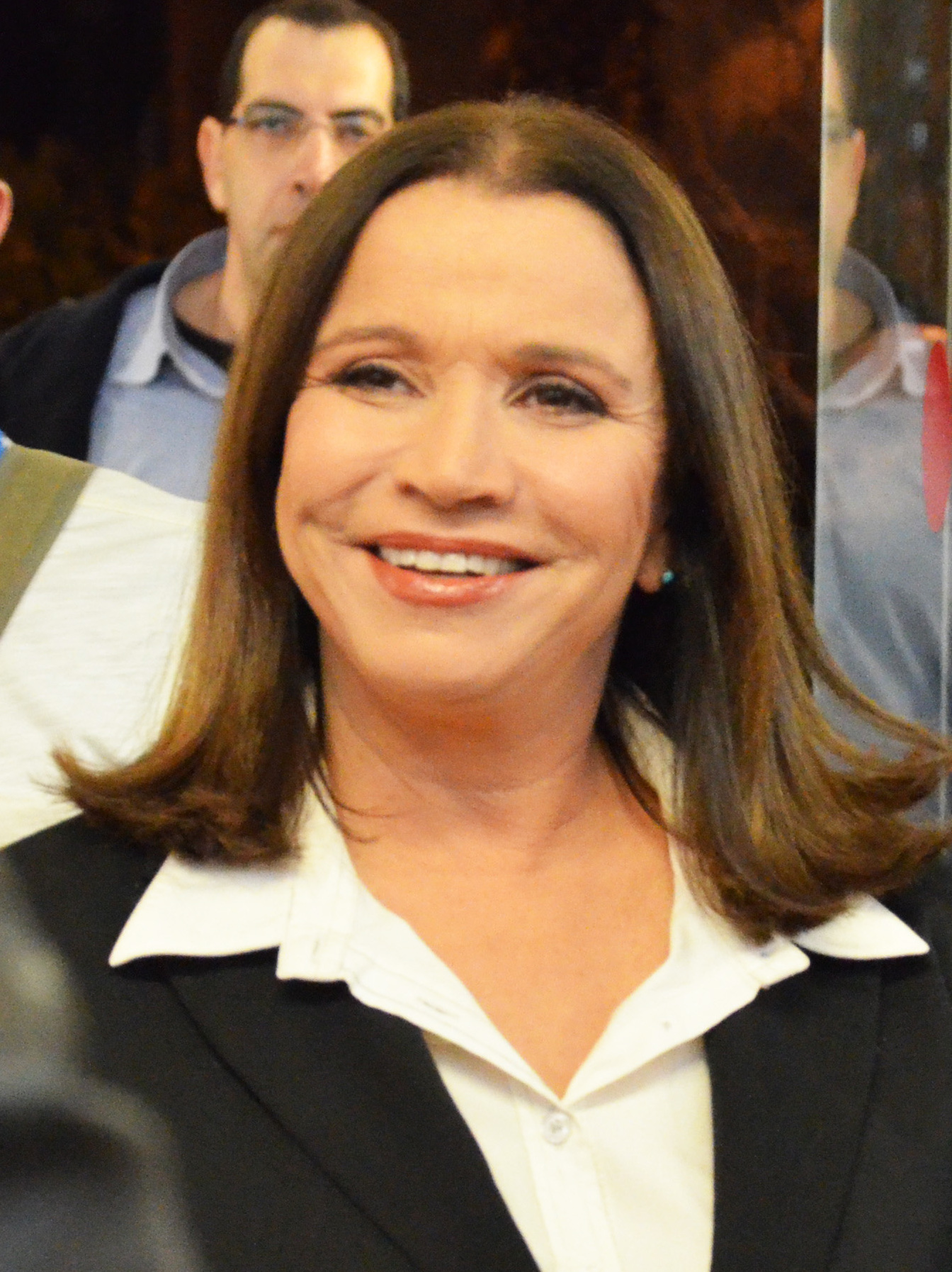

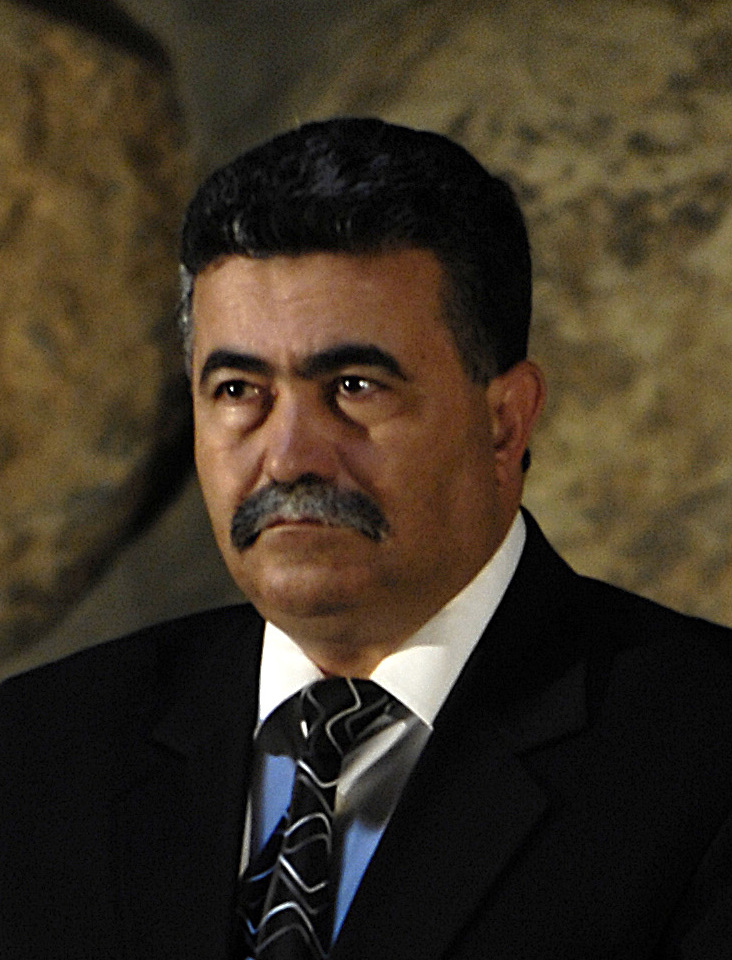

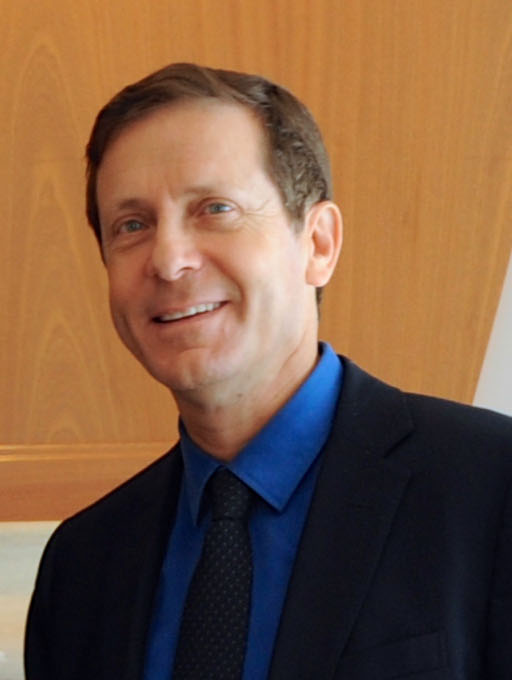

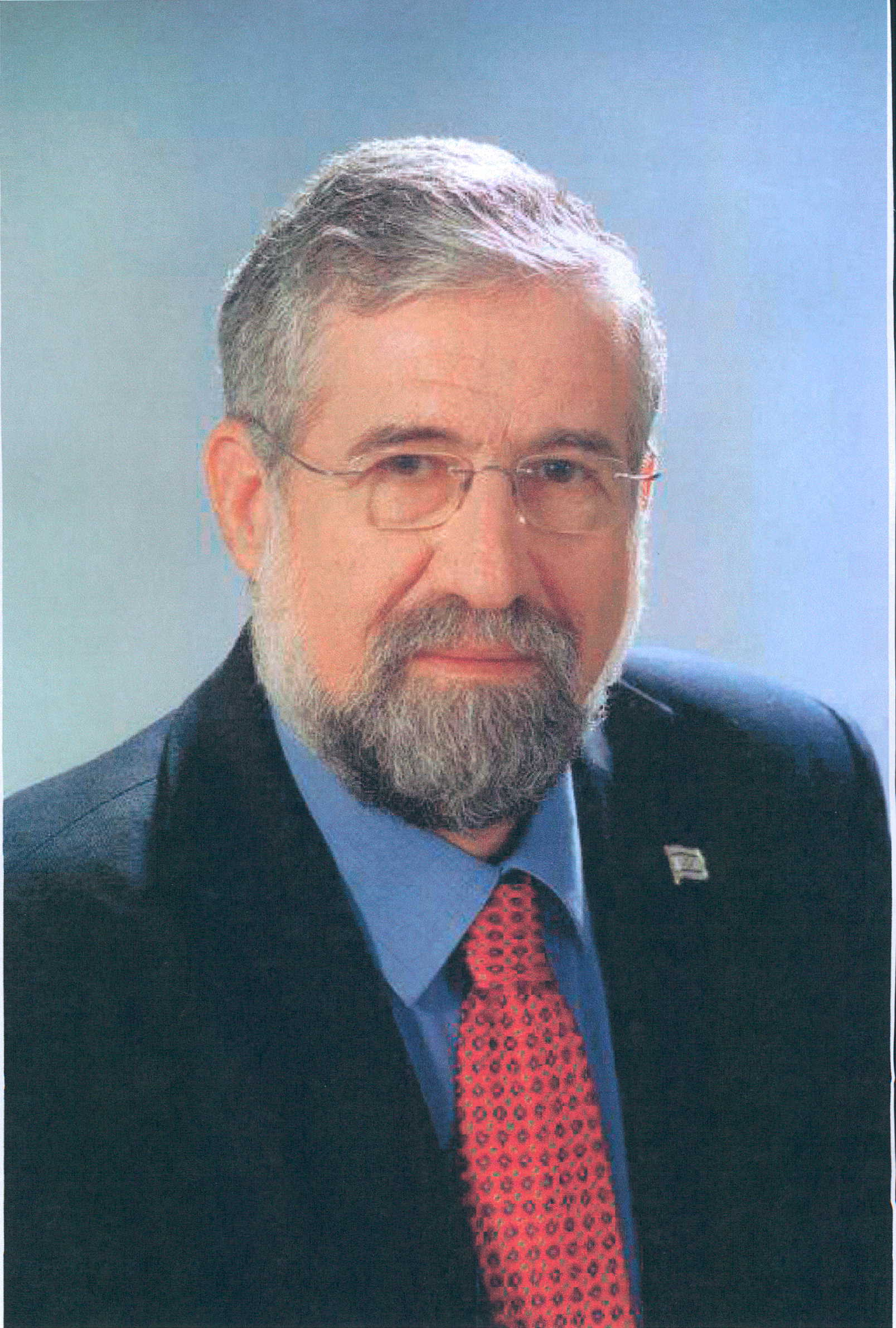
Candidate	Shelly Yachimovich	Amir Peretz
First round	14,003; 32.0%	13,566; 31.0%
Runoff	22,299; 54.5%	18,769; 45.5%
Candidate	Isaac Herzog	Amram Mitzna
First round	10,940; 25.0%	5,251; 12.0%
Leader before election
Michael Harish (acting)
Ehud Barak
Elected Leader
Shelly Yachimovich

A leadership election was held by the Israeli Labor Party on 12 September 2011, with a second round held on 21 September. Member of the Knesset Shelly Yachimovich defeated former party leader Amir Peretz in the second round.

== Election rules ==
Leadership elections in the Israeli Labor Party used a two-round voting system, in which the top two candidates in the first round advanced into a run-off. If a candidate won over 40% of the vote in the first round, he would win automatically and the second round would be cancelled.

== Candidates ==
4 Candidates ran for Labor leadership in this election:

- Shelly Yachimovich, Labor MK and former journalist.
- Amir Peretz, Labor MK, former party leader and current Minister of Defense.
- Isaac Herzog, Labor MK and former Minister of Welfare and Social Services
- Amram Mitzna, Labor MK, former party leader and former mayor of Haifa and Yeruham.

=== Withdrawn ===
- Erel Margalit, Venture Capitalist.
- Avishay Braverman, Labor MK, former Minister of Minorities.

== Results ==
Candidate	First round		Second round	
Candidate	Votes	%	Votes	%
Turnout: 65%			61%	
Shelly Yachimovich ✓	14,003	32%	22,299	54.5%
Amir Peretz	13,566	31%	18,769	45.5%
Isaac Herzog	10,940	25%		
Amram Mitzna	5,251	12%		
Total	43,760	N/A	41,068	N/A

Yachimovich was thus elected leader of the party, becoming the second female leader of the party since Golda Meir, who was elected leader of Mapai in 1969 and automatically became leader of the Labor Party upon the merger of Mapai with Rafi and Ahdut HaAvoda.
