= Zvi Rener =

Israeli politician (1920–1990)

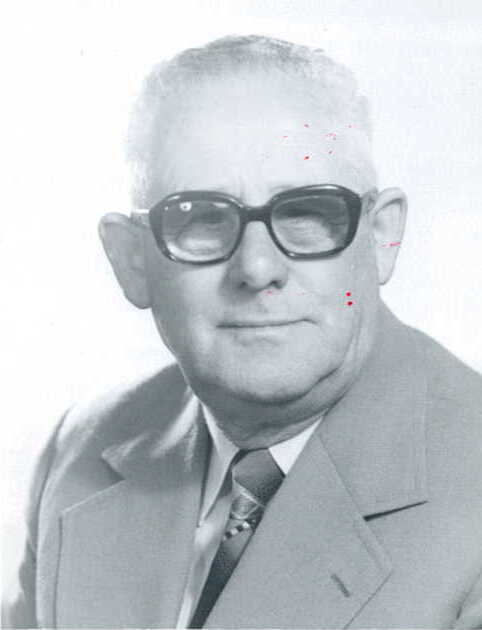
- Rener in the 1980s

Faction represented in the Knesset
- 1981–1984: Likud

Personal details
- Born: 1910
- Died: 31 May 1990 (aged 79–80)

Zvi Renner (Hebrew: צבי רנר; 1910 – 3 May 1990) was an Israeli politician who served as a member of the Knesset for Likud between 1981 and 1984.

== Biography ==
Born in Galicia in 1910, Renner was educated in a yeshiva. He joined the Polish branch of the General Zionists youth movement and emigrated to Mandatory Palestine in 1933. He joined kibbutz Ahva, located near Rehovot, which was associated with the General Zionists. He worked in construction and for Tel Aviv city council, becoming chairman of the personnel department and a member of its directorate.

In 1969 he was elected to the Tel Aviv city council. In 1980 he became chairman of the Liberal Workers Union and also chaired the Liberal Party secretariat (the General Zionists merged into the Liberal Party in 1961), as well as serving as its treasurer. In 1981 he was elected to the Knesset on the Likud list (then an alliance of the Liberal Party, Herut and other right-wing factions), but lost his seat in the 1984 elections.

He died in 1990.
