= Efraim Shalom =

Israeli politician (1934–2017)

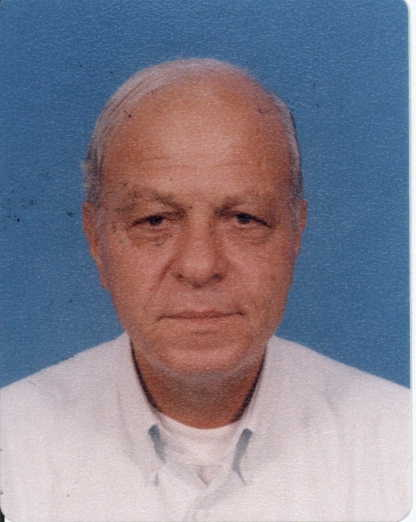
- Shalom in the 1980s

Faction represented in the Knesset
- 1984–1988: Alignment

Personal details
- Born: 17 January 1934; Iraq
- Died: 17 August 2017 (aged 83)

Efraim Shalom (Hebrew: אפרים שלום; 17 January 1934 – 17 August 2017) was an Israeli politician who served as a member of the Knesset for the Alignment between 1984 and 1988. He was a prominent figure amongst the moshav community, serving as secretary of the Moshavim Movement from 1977 until 1984.

== Biography ==
Born in Iraq in 1934, Shalom grew up in neighbouring Iran, before emigrating to Israel in 1950. He settled in the Beit Ezra moshav, becoming its manager in 1954 and secretary in 1957. Between 1959 and 1977 he managed the Be'er Tuvia Regional Council, and between 1961 and 1962 also managed a regional supply company. From 1965 until 1977 he was manager of the southern moshavim's purchasing organisation, and between 1977 and 1984 served as secretary of the Moshavim Movement.

He joined the ruling Mapai party in 1950, and became a member of its central committee in 1964. He became a member of the Labor Party when Mapai merged into it in 1968, and joined its bureau in 1981. In 1984 he was elected to the Knesset on the Alignment list (an alliance of the Labor Party and Mapam), and chaired the Subcommittee for the Issue of Water. He lost his seat in the 1988 elections.
