= Emri Ron =

Israeli politician (1936–2013)

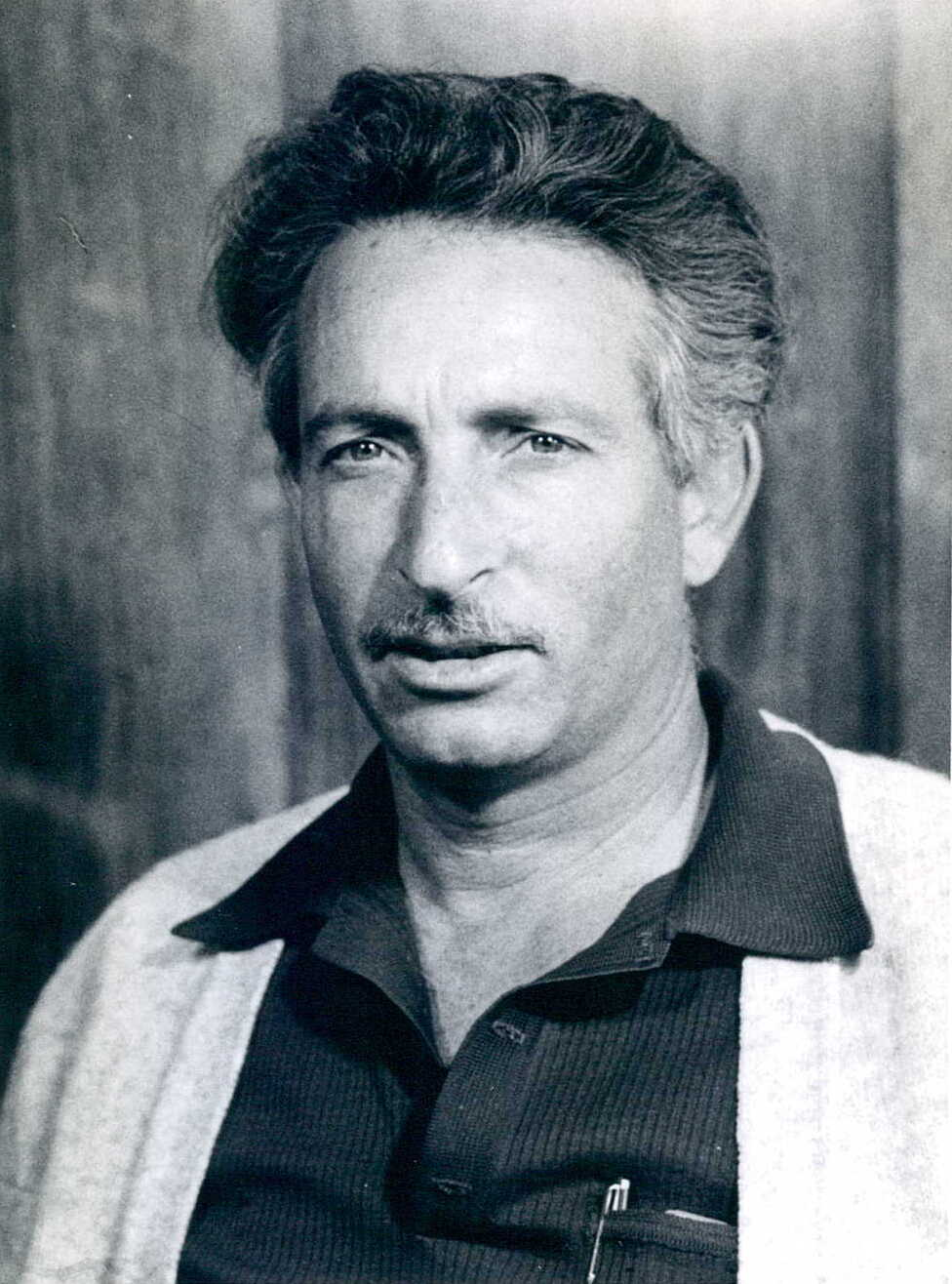
- Ron during his time in the Knesset

Faction represented in the Knesset
- 1978–1984: Alignment

Personal details
- Born: 9 September 1936; Mishmar HaEmek, Mandatory Palestine
- Died: 9 November 2013 (aged 77)

Emri Ron (Hebrew: אמרי רון; 9 September 1936 – 9 November 2013) was an Israeli politician who served as a member of the Knesset for the Alignment between 1978 and 1984.

== Biography ==
Born in Mishmar HaEmek during the Mandate era, Ron attended high school in the kibbutz before studying at the Ruppin Academy.

During the Suez Crisis he commanded a platoon and parachuted into the Mitla Pass. He commanded a company during the Six-Day War, served as a deputy battalion commander during the Yom Kippur War, and as a staff officer in the Paratroopers Brigade during the 1982 Lebanon War.

In 1973 he became secretary of the Kibbutz Artzi movement, a role he held until 1976. He was a member of the movement's secretariat from 1973 until 1976 and again from 1978 until 1984. In 1977 he became a member of the Mapam central committee, and in the Knesset elections that year, he was on the Alignment list (an alliance of Mapam and the Labor Party), but failed to win a seat. However, he entered the Knesset on 2 January 1978 as a replacement for Haim Yosef Zadok, who had resigned.

He was re-elected in 1981, but lost his seat in the 1984 elections, and left the Mapam central committee the following year.
