= Yeruham Meshel =

Israeli trade unionist and politician

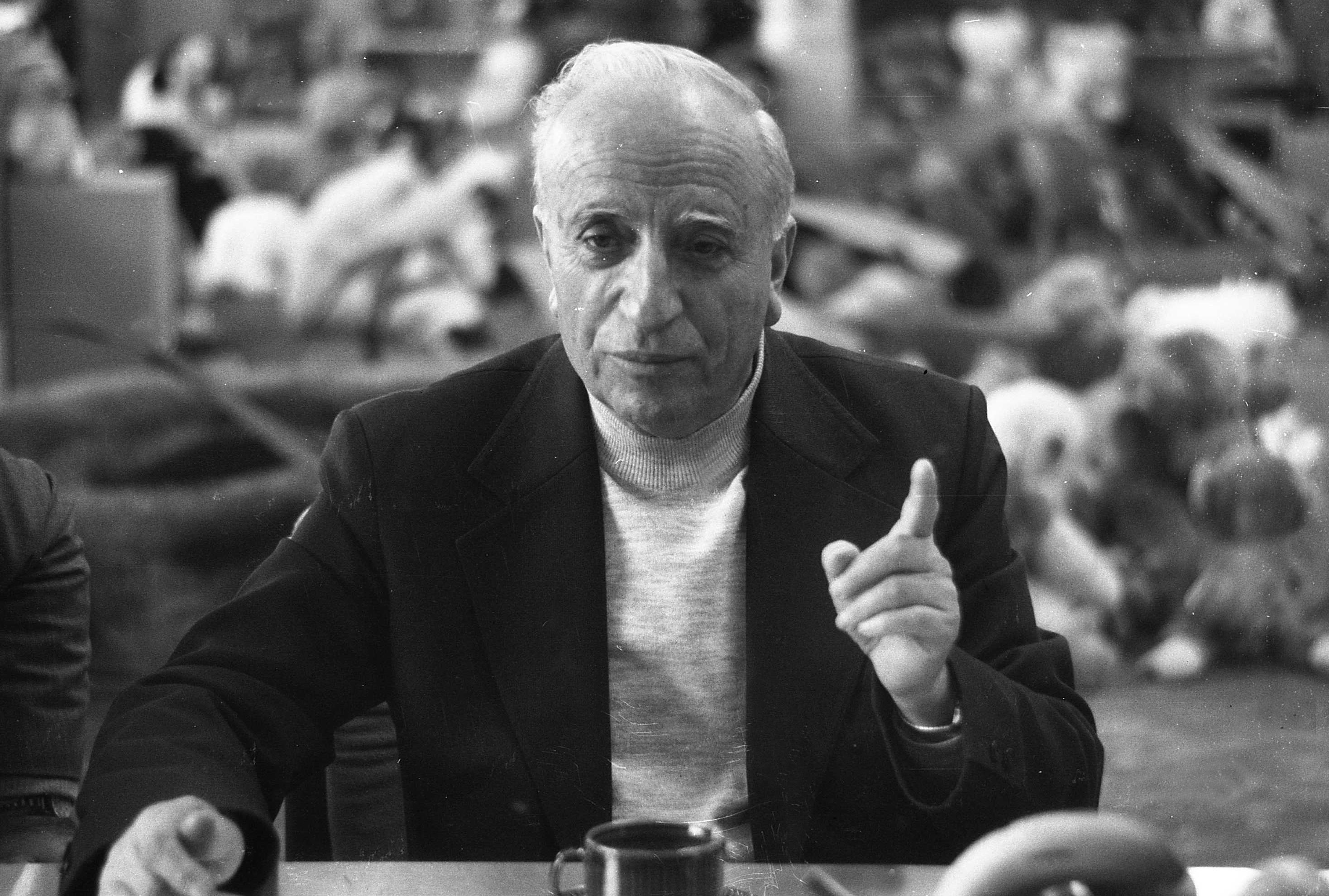
- Meshel in 1981

Faction represented in the Knesset
- 1977–1984: Alignment

Personal details
- Born: 24 November 1912 Pinsk, Russian Empire
- Died: 27 November 2002 (aged 90)

Yeruham Meshel (Hebrew: ירוחם משל; 24 November 1912 – 27 November 2002) was an Israeli union leader and politician who served as head of the Histadrut from 1973 until 1984, and as a member of the Knesset for the Alignment between 1977 and 1984.

== Biography ==
Born in Pinsk in the Russian Empire (today in Belarus), Meshel attended a religious primary school and a Hebrew high school. He was a member of Hashomer Hatzair and emigrated to Mandatory Palestine in 1933. He worked in the construction industry and was a member of Workers Councils.

Between 1940 and 1945 he was a representative for the Histadrut in British Army camps in Palestine. From 1950 until 1960 he was a member of the Histadrut's executive committee and chairman of the Industrial Workers Association. In 1970 he became chairman of the Trade Unions department and deputy secretary of the Histadrut, before becoming secretary general in 1973, a position he held until 1986. He also served as vice-president of Free Trade Union International.

A member of the Labor Party central committee, in 1977 Meshel was elected to the Knesset on the Alignment list (an alliance of Labor and Mapam). The following year he became head of the Pinhas Lavon Institute for Labor Movement Research, and in 1981 was re-elected. He lost his seat in the 1984 elections.

He died in 2002 at the age of 90.
