= Ya'akov Shamai =

Israeli farmer and politician (1940–2016)

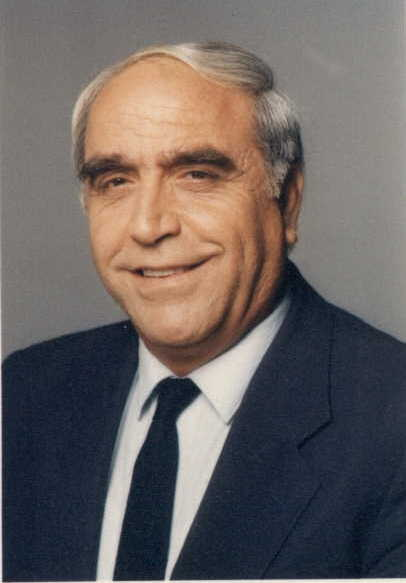
- Shamai during his time in the Knesset

Faction represented in the Knesset
- 1985–1996: Likud

Personal details
- Born: 22 May 1940 Jerusalem, Mandatory Palestine
- Died: 4 October 2016 (aged 76)

Ya'akov Shamai (Hebrew: יעקב שמאי; 22 May 1940 - 4 October 2016) was an Israeli farmer and politician.

== Biography ==
Shamai was born in Jerusalem during the Mandate era. After high school, he did national service in the IDF between 1958 and 1961, before working in agriculture.

He headed the Likud faction in the Histadrut trade union, and was on the Likud list for the 1984 Knesset elections. Although he failed to win a seat, he entered the Knesset on 5 February 1985 as a replacement for the deceased Yitzhak Seiger. He was re-elected in 1988 and 1992, before losing his seat in the 1996 elections. Shamai died on 4 October 2016.

His daughter Yifat is married to Likud MK Yariv Levin.
