= 2013 Israeli Labor Party leadership election =

Israeli Labor Party leadership election

- 22 November 2013

vote by general membership of party
- Turnout: 52.7%
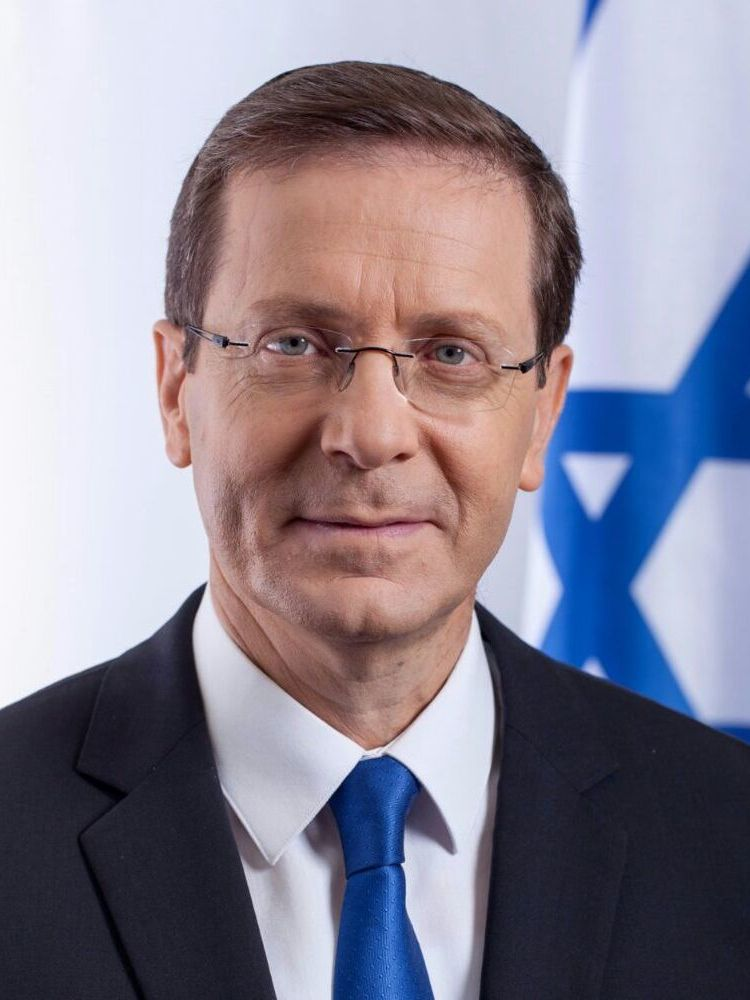

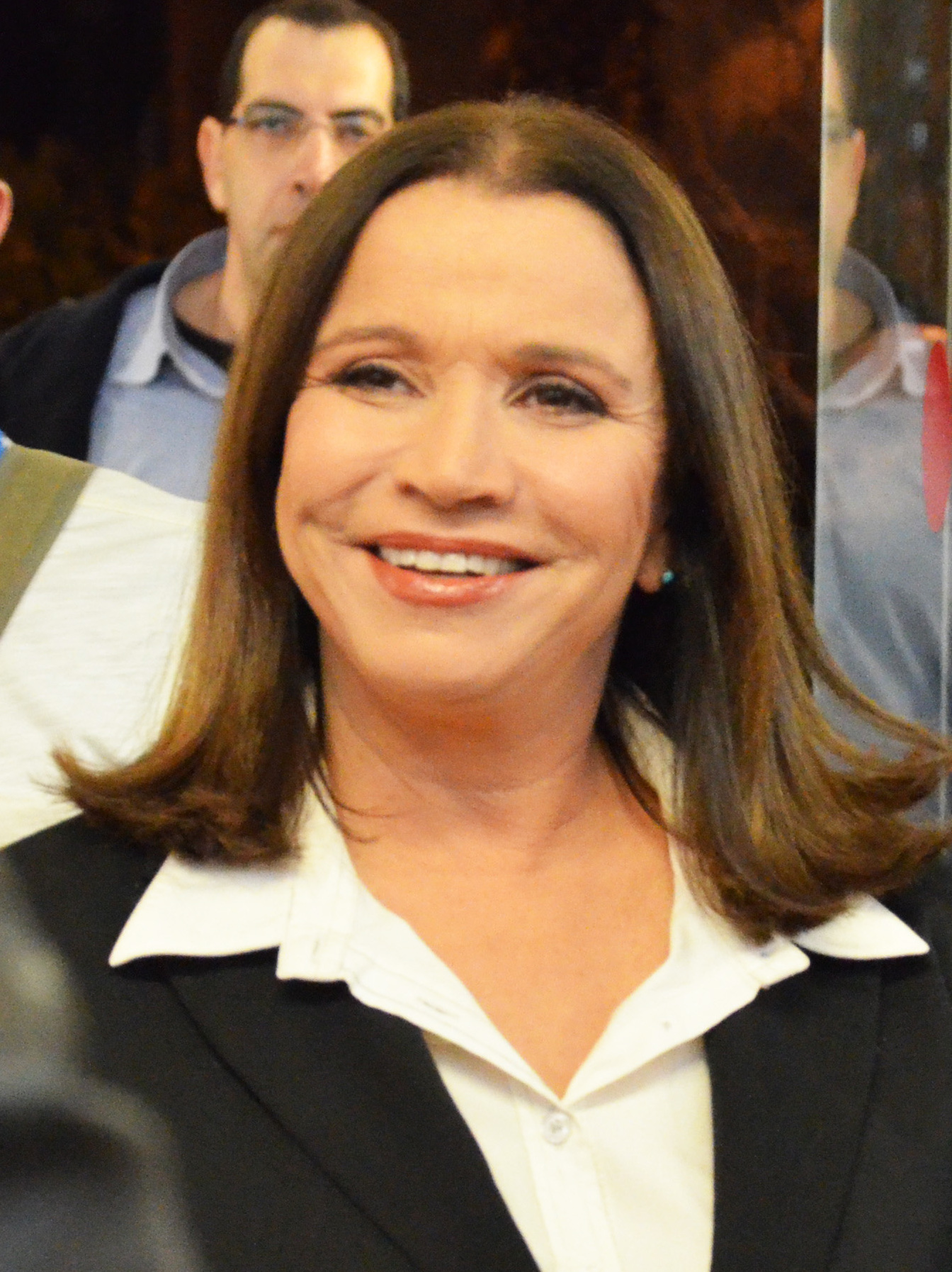
Candidate	Isaac Herzog	Shelly Yachimovich
Popular Vote	16,851	11,955
Percentage	58.5%	41.5%
Leader before election
Shelly Yachimovich
Elected Leader
Isaac Herzog

As a result of the party failing to enter the government after a poor performance in the legislative election in the previous January, a leadership election for the Israeli Labor Party was held on 22 November 2013.

== Candidates ==
- Shelly Yachimovich, incumbent Leader of the Labor Party and incumbent Leader of the Opposition
- Isaac Herzog, Member of the Knesset and former Minister of Welfare and Social Services

== Results ==
The only round of voting was held on November 22:

Candidate	Votes	%
Turnout: 52.7%
Isaac Herzog ✓	16,851	58.5%
Shelly Yachimovich	11,955	41.5%
Total	28,806	—N/a

According to Ynetnews, turnout of voting Labor Party members was a relatively low 52.7%. Herzog won a majority of the votes cast and was thus elected leader of the party.
