= Yehezkel Zakai =

Israeli politician (1932–2021)

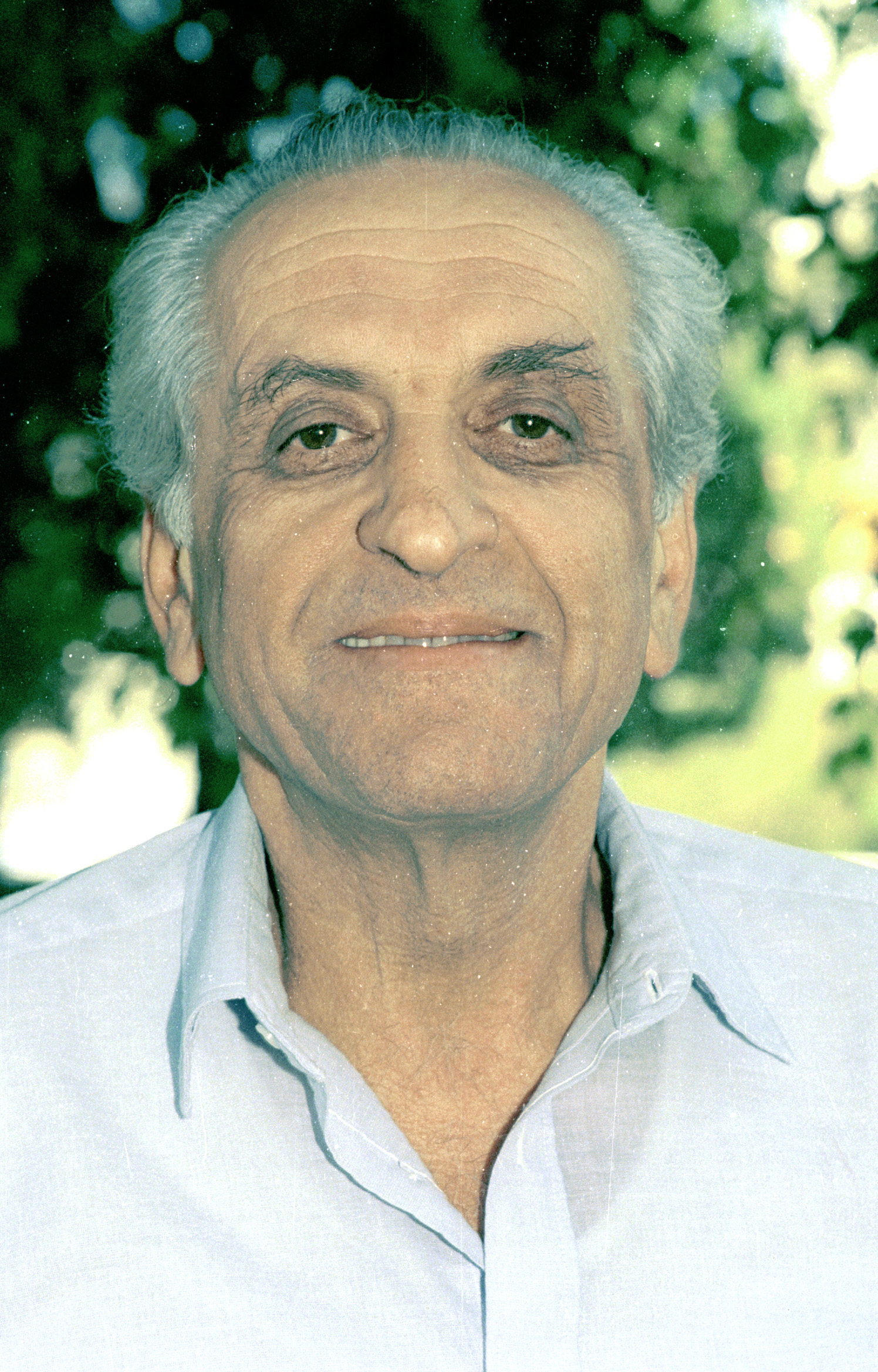
- Zakai in 1989

Faction represented in the Knesset
- 1977–1984: Alignment

Personal details
- Born: 24 April 1932 Kurdistan, Iraq
- Died: 31 March 2021 (aged 88)

Yehezkel Zakai (Hebrew: יחזקאל זכאי; 24 April 1932 – 31 March 2021) was an Israeli politician who served as a member of the Knesset for the Alignment between 1977 and 1984.

== Biography ==
Born in Kurdistan in Iraq in 1932, Zakai emigrated to Israel in 1950. He joined moshav Azaria, and served as its secretary from 1952 until 1953. Between 1954 and 1963 he worked as a guide in the hill settlements.

Having become the Organisation Director for the moshavim near Jerusalem, in 1974 he became deputy secretary-general of the Moshavim Movement. He was secretary of the moshav constituency in the Labor Party, and was elected to the Knesset in 1977 on the Alignment list (an alliance of Labor and Mapam). He was re-elected in 1981, but lost his seat in the 1984 elections.

In 1984 he became director general of Mekorot.
