= Zvi Shiloah =

Israeli politician (1911–2000)

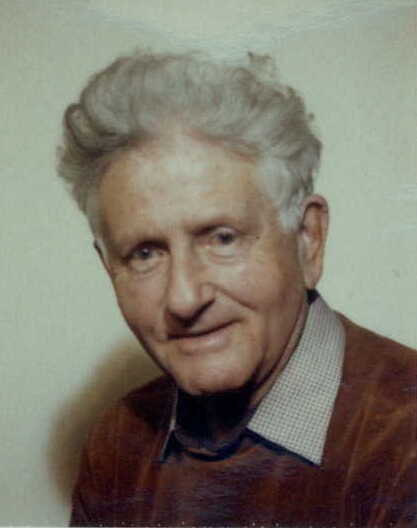
- Shiloah in 1964

Faction represented in the Knesset
- 1984: Tehiya

Personal details
- Born: 6 March 1911 Boryslav, Austria-Hungary
- Died: 10 October 2000 (aged 89)

Zvi Shiloah (Hebrew: צבי שילוח; 6 March 1911 – 10 October 2000) was an Israeli politician who served as a member of the Knesset for Tehiya in 1984.

== Biography ==
Born Zvi Langsam in Boryslav, Austria-Hungary (today in Ukraine), Shiloah was educated in a local gymnasium. During his youth he was a member of the Gordonia movement. He made aliyah to Mandatory Palestine in 1932, and studied history at Tel Aviv University.

In 1934 he joined Mapai, and four years later began working for the Herzliya Workers Council. In 1941 he enlisted into the Artillery Corps of the British Army, and headed a Jewish Brigade delegation to the Munich Displaced Persons camp.

In 1949 he became editor of HaDoar, a role he held until 1954. He was elected to the Mapai central committee in 1950, and Herzliya city council in 1954. From 1960 until 1964 he was the city's deputy mayor. In 1965 he joined the new Rafi party and became a member of its secretariat. In 1967 he was amongst the founders of the Movement for Greater Israel, and edited its biweekly publication Zot HaAretz. When Likud was formed by an alliance of several right-wing parties in 1973, he became a member of its directorate.

In 1977 he left Likud and was amongst the founders of Tehiya. He chaired the party's council, and was on its list for the 1981 elections. Although he failed to win a seat, he entered the Knesset on 7 March 1984 as a replacement for Hanan Porat, who had resigned. However, he lost his seat in the July 1984 elections.

He died in 2000 at the age of 89.
