= Hamad Khalaily =

Arab-Israeli politician (1928-2014)

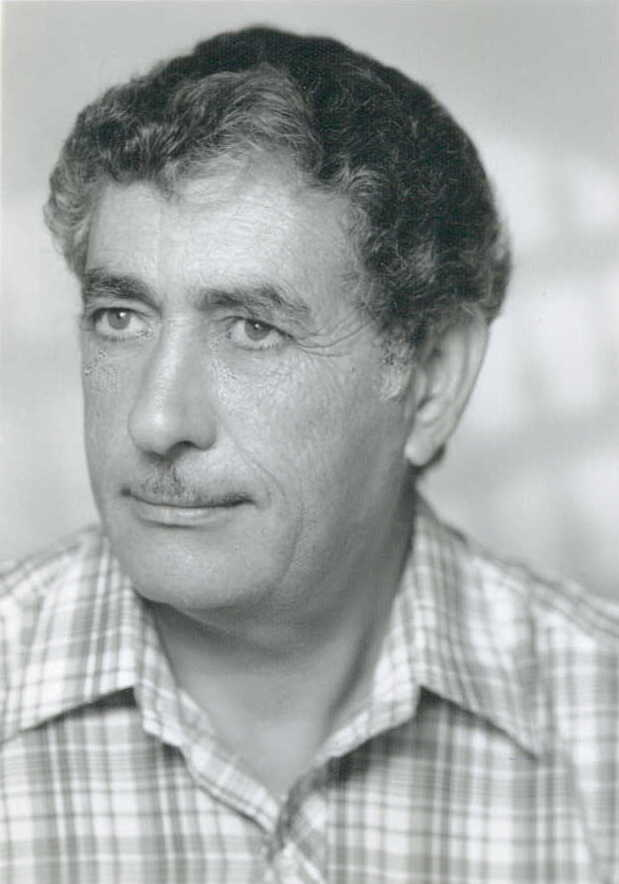
- Khalaily in the early 1980s

Faction represented in the Knesset
- 1981–1984: Alignment

Personal details
- Born: 1928 Sakhnin, Mandatory Palestine
- Died: 13 May 2014 (aged 85–86)

Hamad Khalaily (Arabic: حمد خلايلة, Hebrew: חמד חלאילה; 1928 – 13 May 2014) was an Arab-Israeli politician who served as a member of the Knesset for the Alignment from 1981 until 1984.

== Biography ==
Khalaily was born in Sakhnin during the Mandate era and received a high school education. He worked for the Histadrut trade union as a clerk.

In 1981 he was elected to the Knesset on the Alignment list. He sat on the Education and Culture Committee and the Committee for the Appointment of Qadis, until losing his seat in the 1984 elections.
