= Eliyahu Speiser =

Israeli politician (1930–2009)

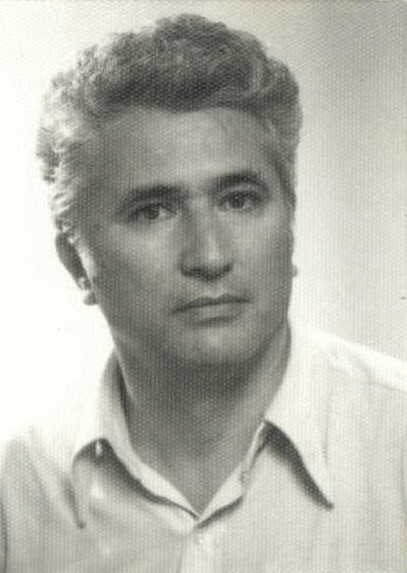

Faction represented in the Knesset
- 1977–1988: Alignment

Personal details
- Born: 23 March 1930; Haifa, Mandatory Palestine
- Died: 12 November 2009 (aged 79)

Eliyahu Speiser (Hebrew: אליהו שפייזר; 23 March 1930 – 12 November 2009) was an Israeli politician who served as a member of the Knesset for the Alignment between 1977 and 1988.

== Biography ==
Born in Haifa during the Mandate era, Speiser studied bacteriology at the Hebrew University of Jerusalem and economics and law at the University of Paris.

In 1965 he joined Mapai, and in 1968 became secretary of the newly formed Labor Party in the Tel Aviv district. He served as deputy mayor of Tel Aviv and chaired the association of cities of the Dan Area. He became international secretary of the Labor Party, and in 1977 was elected to the Knesset on the Alignment list (an alliance of Labor and Mapam). He was re-elected in 1981 and 1984, before losing his seat in the 1988 elections.

He died in 2009 at the age of 79.
