= Yehiel Leket =

Israeli Zionist activist and politician

- יחיאל לקט
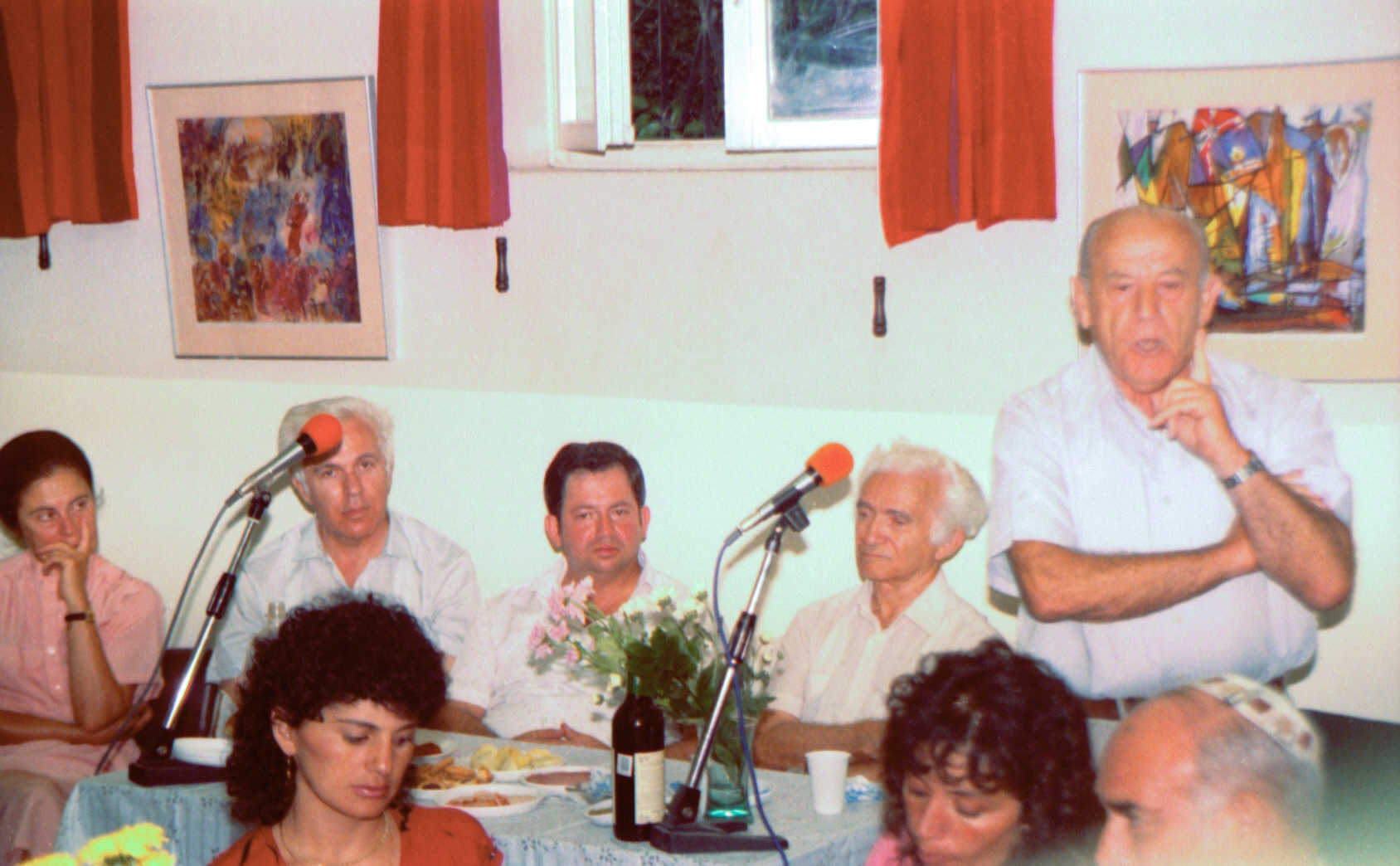
- Leket around 1980

Faction represented in the Knesset
- 1977: Alignment

Personal details
- Born: 12 July 1941 (age 85) Haifa, Mandatory Palestine

Yehiel Leket (Hebrew: יחיאל לקט; born 12 July 1941) is an Israeli Zionist activist and former politician who briefly served as a member of the Knesset for the Alignment in 1977.

== Biography ==
Born in Haifa during the Mandate era, Leket attended the Hebrew University of Jerusalem, where he studied philosophy and political science. He began working at the Ministry of Education and Culture, and was the ministry's spokesman between 1965 and 1969, serving as chairman of the Government Ministry's Spokesmens group between 1967 and 1968.

In 1969 he became chairman of the young leadership of the Labor Party. He was on the Alignment list for the 1973 elections, but failed to win a seat. Between 1975 and 1976 served as the head Aliyah emissary in the United States, and the following year entered the Knesset at the start of January as a replacement for Avraham Ofer, who had committed suicide following the Yadlin affair. However, he lost his seat in the May 1977 elections.

Between 1978 and 1982 Leket served as general secretary of the World Labor Zionist Organization, and from 1982 until 1989 as its chairman. From 1989 until 1992 he headed the Settlement Division of the World Zionist Organization, and between 1992 and 1996 headed the Youth Aliyah department of the Jewish Agency. In 1994 he briefly served as acting chairman of the WZO and the Jewish Agency, before being appointed head of the Department of Development and Settlement and chairman of Youth Aliyah in 1996.
