= Eliezer Kulas =

Israeli politician

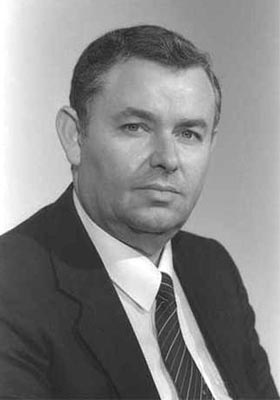
- Kulas in the 1980s

Faction represented in the Knesset
- 1981–1988: Likud

Personal details
- Born: 29 August 1944 (age 81) Kyzylorda, Soviet Union

Eliezer Kulas (Hebrew: אליעזר קולס; born 29 August 1944) is an Israeli former politician who served as a member of the Knesset for Likud between 1981 and 1988.

== Biography ==
Born in Kyzylorda in the Kyzylorda Oblast of the Kazakh SSR in the Soviet Union (today in Kazakhstan), Kulas emigrated to Israel in 1948. He attended the Hugim High School in Haifa, before studying economics, statistics and law at the Hebrew University of Jerusalem and was certified as a lawyer.

In 1962 he joined the Liberal Party. He worked as a senior advisor to the Minister of Housing and Construction, and served as director of the ministerial bureau between 1977 and 1978. He then worked as an advisor to the Minister of Industry, Trade and Tourism between 1978 and 1980, and was responsible for retail trade and small industry from 1980 until 1981.

In 1981 he was elected to the Knesset on the Likud list (then an alliance of the Liberal Party, Herut and other right-wing factions), and became chairman of the Constitution, Law and Justice Committee. He was re-elected in 1984 and remained chair of the committee, but lost his seat in the 1988 elections.
