= Yitzhak Seiger =

Israeli politician

- יצחק זיגר
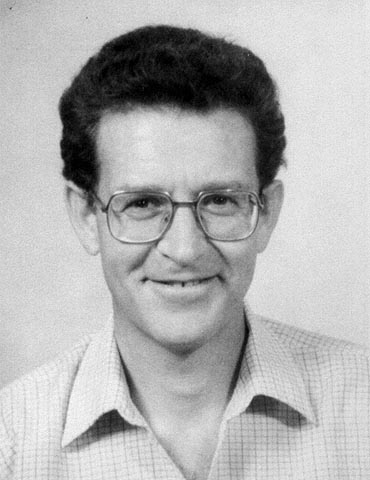
- Seiger in the 1980s

Faction represented in the Knesset#
- 1981–1985: Likud

Personal details
- Born: 22 February 1936; Haifa, Mandatory Palestine
- Died: 5 February 1985 (aged 48); Israel

Yitzhak Seiger (Hebrew: יצחק זיגר; 22 February 1936 – 5 February 1985) was an Israeli politician who served as a member of the Knesset for Likud between 1981 and his death in 1985.

== Biography ==
Born in Haifa during the Mandate era, Seiger studied economics, political science and law at the Hebrew University of Jerusalem and was certified as a lawyer.

In 1969 he joined the Liberal Party. He went on to become chairman of the party's Economics Council and a member of its central committee and directorate, and was also a member of the executive committee of the Hitahdut HaIkarim.

In 1981 he was elected to the Knesset on the Likud list (then an alliance of the Liberal Party, Herut and other right-wing factions). He was re-elected in 1984, but died in office the following year. His seat was taken by Ya'akov Shamai.
