= Benny Shalita =

Israeli politician

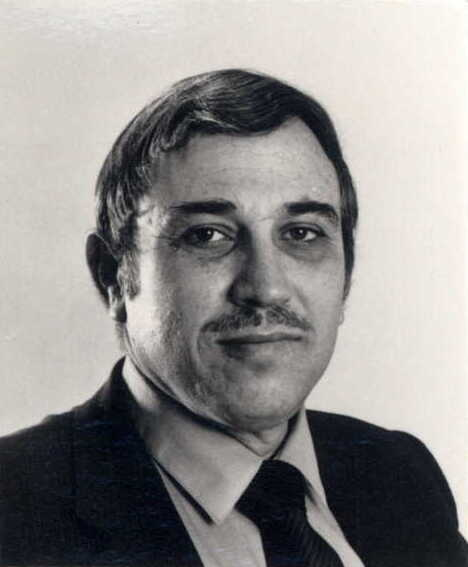
- Shalita in the 1980s

Faction represented in the Knesset
- 1981–1988: Likud

Personal details
- Born: 13 November 1934; Haifa, Mandatory Palestine
- Died: 4 June 2025 (aged 90)

Benny Shalita (Hebrew: בני שליטא; 13 November 1934 – 4 June 2025) was an Israeli politician, who served as a member of the Knesset for Likud between 1981 and 1988, and as mayor of Menahemia from 1956 until 1992.

== Biography ==
Born in Haifa during the Mandate era, Shalita attended an External high school, before studying political science at university.

In 1956, at the age of 22, he was elected mayor of Menahemia local council, becoming the country's youngest-ever council head. He became a member of the board of directors of the Local Government Association, a member of the Galilee Authority, and a member of the board of directors of the Development towns. He remained mayor of the council until 1992.

A member of the Liberal Party, he was elected to the Knesset on the Likud list (then an alliance of the Liberal Party, Herut and other right-wing factions) in 1981. During his first term he sat on the Economic Affairs Committee, the Foreign Affairs and Defense Committee and the Internal Affairs and Environment Committee. He was re-elected in 1984, after which he also joined the State Control Committee, the Education and Culture Committee, the Immigration and Absorption Committee and the Finance Committee. He lost his seat in the 1988 elections.

Shalita died in June 2025 at the age of 90.
