= Yehuda Hashai =

Israeli politician (born 1934)

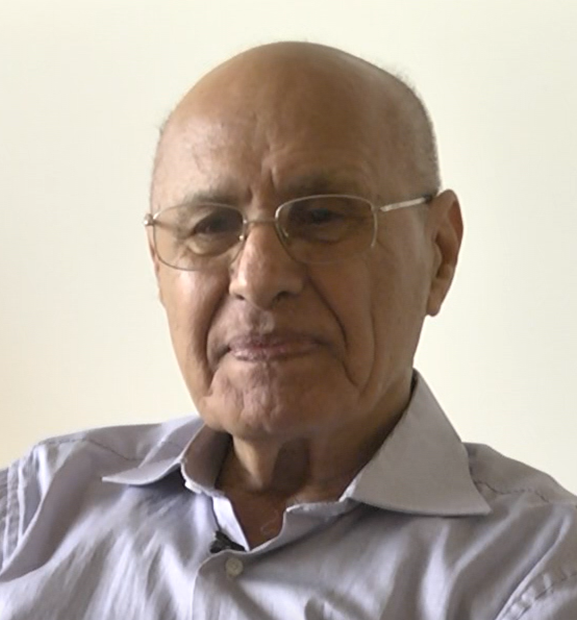

Faction represented in the Knesset
- 1980–1984: Alignment

Personal details
- Born: 3 January 1934 (age 91); Ad Dali', Yemen

Yehuda Hashai (Hebrew: יהודה חשאי; born 3 January 1934) is an Israeli former politician who served as a member of the Knesset for the Alignment from 1980 until 1984.

== Biography ==
Born in Ad Dali' in what is today Yemen in 1934, Hashai emigrated to Mandatory Palestine the same year. After attending high school he carried out his national service in the Paratroopers Brigade. He later studied at Tel Aviv University, where he earned an MA in philosophy and Middle East studies.

In 1961 he joined Mapai, and became a member of the central committee of the Labor Party when it was formed by a merger of Mapai, Ahdut HaAvoda and Rafi in 1968. He served as director of the Yemenite Immigrants department and the Municipalities department. He was on the Alignment list (an alliance of Labor and Mapam) for the 1977 elections. Although he failed to win a seat, he entered the Knesset on 29 February 1980 as a replacement for the deceased Yigal Allon. He retained his seat in the 1981 elections, but lost it in the 1984 elections. He also served as deputy chairman of the Central Elections Committee.

After retiring from public life, Hashai devoted himself to his hobby of photography, and chairs the Israeli Photographic Art Society.

His son Niron is a professor of strategy and international business at Reichman University.
