= Uri Sebag =

Israeli politician (born 1931)

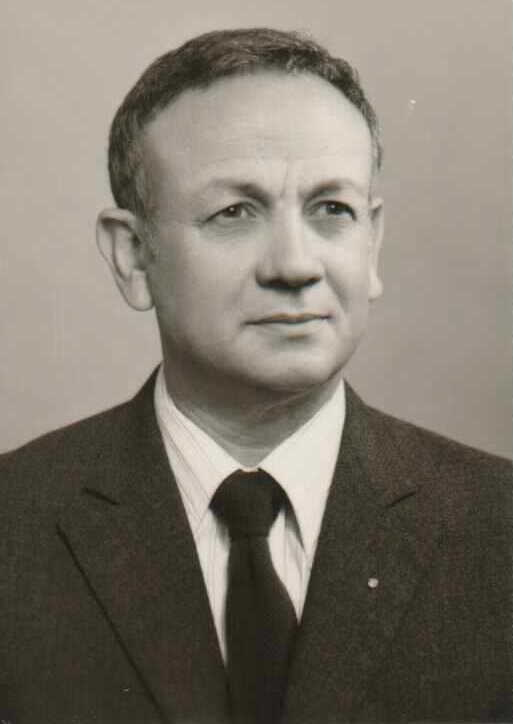
- Sebag in the 1980s

Faction represented in the Knesset
- 1981–1984: Alignment
- 1988: Alignment

Personal details
- Born: 11 November 1931 (age 94) Safi, Morocco

Uri Sebag (Hebrew: אורי סבג; born 11 November 1931) is an Israeli former politician who served as a member of the Knesset for the Alignment during the 1980s.

== Biography ==
Born in Safi in Morocco, Sebag studied metallurgy at a technical high school in Casablanca. He was later certified as an engineer, and graduated from the Public Administration College. He lived in Marrakesh, where he was a member of the Dror movement, and was also a member of the HaMagen underground Jewish defense organisation from 1948 until 1950.

In 1951 he emigrated to Israel and joined the ruling Mapai party, becoming a member of its central committee in 1959. He worked as a teacher in vocational training in Beersheba from 1957 until 1963, and then as a supervisor of vocational education for the Ministry of Education from 1963 until 1968.

From 1968 until 1981 he served as the secretary of the Beersheva Workers Council, and between 1974 and 1982 was also a member of the Histadrut's Organisation Committee.

In 1981 he was elected to the Knesset on the Alignment list (an alliance of Mapam and the Labor Party, which Mapai had merged into in 1968). He lost his seat in the 1984 elections, but returned to the Knesset on 31 October 1988 as a replacement for Adiel Amorai. However, he lost his seat again in the November 1988 elections.
