= Haneh Hadad =

Israeli Arab police officer and politician (1919–2020)

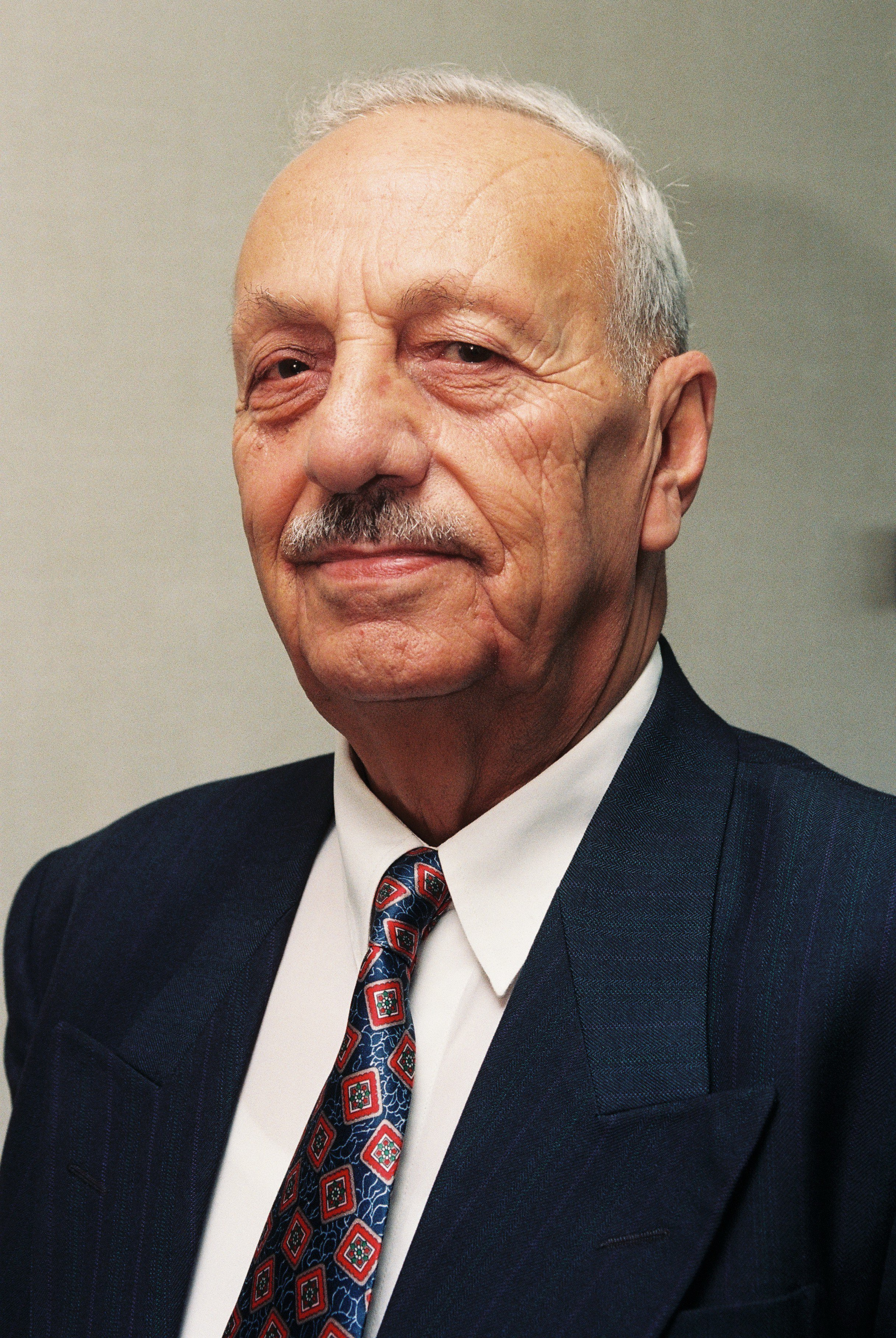
- Hadad in 1995

Faction represented in the Knesset
- 1995–1996: Labor Party

Personal details
- Born: 19 April 1919 Jish, Palestine
- Died: 5 October 2020 (aged 101)

Haneh Hadad (Arabic: حنا حداد, Hebrew: חנא חדד; 19 April 1919 – 5 October 2020) was an Israeli Arab police officer and politician who served as a member of the Knesset for the Labor Party between 1995 and 1996.

== Biography ==
Born in Jish in April 1919, Hadad received a high school education, before joining the police force. He worked as a detective and became a Chief Superintendent and assistant to the Minister of Police.

In the 1981 Knesset elections he headed the Arab Brotherhood List, but it received only 0.4% of the vote and failed to cross the electoral threshold. In 1988 he became a member of the Israeli delegation to the United Nations. He was on the Labor Party list for the 1992 elections, but failed to win a seat. However, he entered the Knesset on 5 July 1995 as a replacement for Avraham Burg, and was made a Deputy Speaker. He lost his seat in the 1996 elections.
