= Victor Tayar =

Israeli artist and political figure (1931–1993)

Victor Tayar (Hebrew: ויקטור תייר; 1931–1993) was an Israeli artist and political figure.

== Biography ==
Born in Libya, Tayar made aliyah to Israel and settled in Jaffa.

During the 1970s he was amongst the leaders of the Black Panthers. For the 1981 elections he headed a party called Amkha, but won only 460 votes. In the 1984 elections Amkha won 733 votes. For the 1988 elections the list was renamed "Unity - for Victor Tayar to the Knesset", but won only 446 votes.

He died in 1993.
