= Ya'akov Gil (politician born 1931) =

Israeli politician

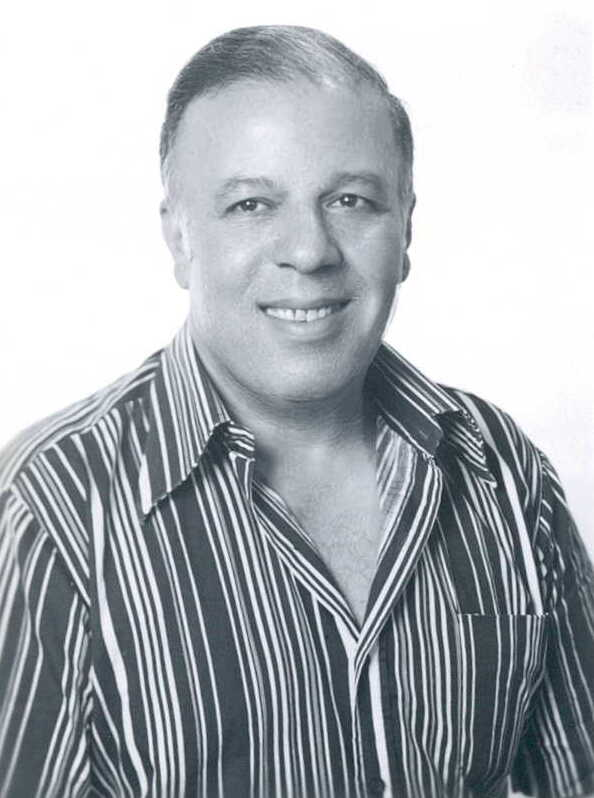

Faction represented in the Knesset
- 1981–1984: Alignment
- 1988: Alignment

Personal details
- Born: 17 January 1931; Jerusalem, Mandatory Palestine
- Died: 21 January 2007 (aged 76)

Ya'akov Gil (Hebrew: יעקב גיל; 17 January 1931 – 21 January 2007) was an Israeli politician who served as a member of the Knesset for the Alignment during the 1980s.

== Biography ==
Born Ya'akov Gila in Jerusalem, Gil was educated at Beit Alpha, before studying social work at the Hebrew University of Jerusalem. A member of Hashomer Hatzair, he joined kibbutz Megiddo in 1952, but left two years later. He worked for Jerusalem City Council from 1965 until 1983.

In 1964 he joined Mapai. After it merged into the Labor Party, he later became a member of Labor Party's Jerusalem executive, and chaired the youth section of the party's central committee. In 1981 he was elected to the Knesset on the list of the Alignment, an alliance of Labour and Mapam. He lost his seat in the 1984 elections, but returned to the Knesset on 15 March 1988 as a replacement for Simcha Dinitz. However, he lost his seat again in the November 1988 elections.

He died in 2007 at the age of 76.
