= Michael Harish =

Israeli politician (born 1936)

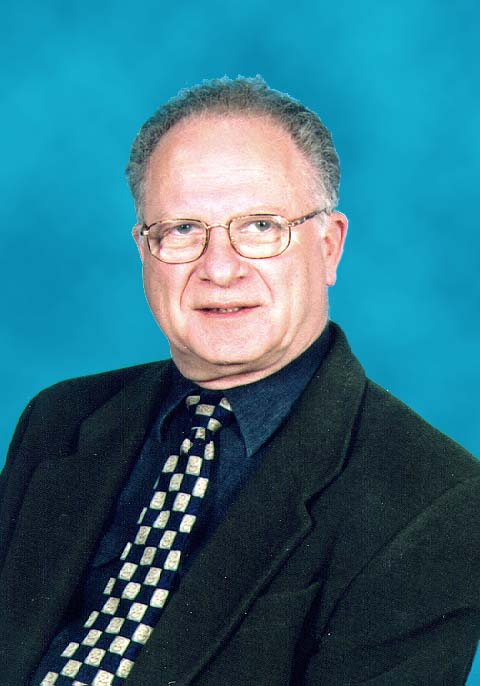

Ministerial roles
- 1992–1996: Minister of Industry and Trade

Faction represented in the Knesset
- 1974–1991: Alignment
- 1991–1996: Labor Party

Personal details
- Born: 28 November 1936 (age 88); Timișoara, Romania

Michael Harish (Hebrew: מיכאל חריש; born 28 November 1936) is a former Israeli politician who served as Minister of Industry and Trade between 1992 and 1996. Since 23 January 2011, he has served as the temporary chairman of the Labor Party, following the resignation of Ehud Barak as party chairman.

== Biography ==
Born in Timișoara in Romania in 1936, Harish emigrated to Israel in 1950, and served in the Golani Brigade during his mandatory military service. He subsequently studied for a BA in economics and political science at the Hebrew University of Jerusalem.

A member of the Labor Party, he was elected to the Knesset on the Alignment list in 1973. He was re-elected in 1977 and became chairman of the subcommittee on energy, a role he retained after retaining his seat in the 1981 elections.

He was re-elected in 1984, 1988 and 1992, and was appointed Minister of Industry and Trade in Yitzhak Rabin's government in July 1992. He lost his seat and cabinet position in the 1996 elections. During his time in the Labor Party he served as its general secretary.
