= 1984 Israeli legislative election =

- 23 July 1984
- All 120 seats in the Knesset; 61 seats needed for a majority
- Turnout: 78.8% (▲0.3 pp)
Party	Leader	Vote %	Seats	+/–
Alignment	Shimon Peres	34.9	44	−3
Likud	Yitzhak Shamir	31.9	41	−7
Tehiya-Tzomet	Yuval Ne'eman	4.0	5	+2
Mafdal	Yosef Burg	3.5	4	−2
Hadash	Meir Vilner	3.4	4	0
Shas	Yitzhak Peretz	3.1	4	New
Shinui	Amnon Rubinstein	2.7	3	+1
Ratz	Shulamit Aloni	2.4	3	+2
Yahad	Ezer Weizman	2.2	3	New
PLFP	Mohammed Miari	1.8	2	New
Agudat Yisrael	Avraham Yosef Shapira	1.7	2	−2
Morasha	Haim Drukman	1.6	2	New
Tami	Aharon Abuhatzira	1.5	1	−2
Kach	Meir Kahane	1.2	1	+1
Ometz	Yigal Hurvitz	1.2	1	New
This lists parties that won seats. See the complete results below.
Prime Minister before	Prime Minister after
Yitzhak Shamir; Likud	Shimon Peres; Alignment

Legislative elections were held in Israel on 23 July 1984 to elect the eleventh Knesset. Voter turnout was 78.8%. The results saw the Alignment return to being the largest party in the Knesset, a status it had lost in 1977. However, the party could not form a government with any of the smaller parties, resulting in a grand coalition government with Likud, with both party leaders, Shimon Peres and Yitzhak Shamir, holding the post of prime minister for two years each.

== Parliamentary factions ==
The table below lists the parliamentary factions represented in the 10th Knesset.

Name	Ideology	Symbol	Leader	1981 result		Seats at 1983 dissolution
Name	Ideology	Symbol	Leader	Votes (%)	Seats	Seats at 1983 dissolution
Likud	National liberalism	מחל	Yitzhak Shamir	37.1%	48 / 120	46 / 120
Alignment	Social democracy Labor Zionism	אמת	Shimon Peres	36.6%	47 / 120	49 / 120
Mafdal	Religious Zionism	ב	Yosef Burg	4.9%	6 / 120	6 / 120
Agudat Yisrael	Religious conservatism	ג	Avraham Yosef Shapira	3.7%	4 / 120	4 / 120
Hadash	Communism; Socialism	ו	Meir Vilner	3.4%	4 / 120	4 / 120
Tehiya	Ultranationalism; Revisionist Zionism	ת	Yuval Ne'eman; Geula Cohen	2.3	3 / 120	3 / 120
Tami	Religious Zionism; Mizrahi interests	ני	Aharon Abuhatzira	2.3%	2 / 120	2 / 120
Telem	Centrism	כן	Moshe Dayan	1.6%	2 / 120	0 / 120
Ometz	Conservatism		Yigal Hurvitz	1.6%	did not exist	1 / 120
Movement for the Renewal of Social Zionism	Zionism	-	Mordechai Ben-Porat	1.6%	did not exist	1 / 120
Shinui	Liberalism; Centrism	הן	Amnon Rubinstein	1.5%	2 / 120	2 / 120
Ratz	Progressivism; Secularism	רצ	Shulamit Aloni	1.4%	1 / 120	1 / 120

== Campaign ==
Since the previous election, hyperinflation increased to 350%. Up to election week, opinion polls (among those with telephones) showed a clear lead for the Alignment, scoring 42% over the Likud's 28%.

The televised party political broadcasts of the two major parties were intensified. The Likud brought in comedian Sefi Rivlin to mock Alignment leader Shimon Peres, and in turn, the Alignment brought in the comedy trio HaGashash HaHiver to ridicule the Likud.

1984 became an important year for the Arab vote. Turnout went from 68% in 1981 to 76% in 1984, thanks to the rise of the Progressive List for Peace. The new party was especially successful in getting younger Arab voters to the ballot box. Hadash called for voters to 'eliminate' the Progressives. The Progressives claimed that the actions of Hadash were akin to 'fascism, Nazism, and the Gush Emunim'. Hadash accused the Progressives of being set up on the command of the PLO, as well as being CIA agents. The Electoral Commission briefly banned the Progressives from running due to the alleged ties to the PLO that Hadash had raised. Nayef Hawatmeh of the Democratic Front for the Liberation of Palestine condemned the Progressives for 'serving' the Likud and the Alignment.

Infighting also happened within the Jewish left. Ratz advised people not to vote for Aryeh Eliav's list, claiming it would fail to surpass the threshold, and that "several hundred, and perhaps, God forbid, several thousand votes from good people" would be burnt. Ratz had previously offered to place Eliav second on their list. This came after the disintegration of Eliav's Sheli party, which Ratz had absorbed many remnants of. When a poll was published showing Eliav over the electoral threshold, he wrote to Ratz leader Shulamit Aloni, “I’m glad we’re both clearing the electoral threshold; see you in the next Knesset". Eliav only received 0.74% of votes, which did not win him a seat in the Knesset.

Ratz and Shinui had a public spat when a report in Haaretz claimed that Ratz had received IS40,000 to support its election campaign in exchange for abstaining on a vote around the parliamentary immunity of Aharon Abuhatzira. David Zucker of Ratz denied this. Ratz then published a leaflet criticising Shinui for its surplus agreement with the centrist Yahad, and for supporting the government on the 1982 Lebanon War.

Morasha and Mafdal's conflict was also made public; the two parties enlisted the support of multiple rabbis to try and gain the upper hand over each other.

=== Party slogans ===
Party or alliance	Original slogan	English translation
Likud	"העם רוצה ליכוד"	"The people want Likud"
Alignment	"המערך הוא התקווה היחידה"	"The Alignment is the only hope"
Alignment	"التجمع - هو الأمل"	"The Alignment is the only hope"
Mafdal	"בלי אבל- הצבע מפד"ל!"	"No buts about it - vote for Mafdal!"
Hadash	"קו חד"ש לשלום"	"A new [Hadash] line for peace"
Tehiya-Tzomet	"התחייה-צומת: בראש כל המחנה הציוני-לאומי"	"Tehiya-Tzomet: at the head of the entire Nationalist Zionist camp"
Shinui	"הפעם ממשלה בלי עבריינים"	"This time a government without criminals"
Ratz	"אתה רצ או הולך לאיבוד"	"Either you run [Ratz] or get left behind"
Kach	"כהנא: האיש שאומר מה שאתם חושבים"	"Kahane: The man who says what you think"
Shas	"ש"ס - להשיב עטרה ליושנה"	"Shas - restoring the crown to its former glory"
Progressive List for Peace	"הצדק איתנו - הכוח איתם! חזקו אותנו, החלישו אותם!"	"Justice is on our side - power is on theirs! Strengthen us, weaken them!"
Progressive List for Peace	"نعم للمساواه فن نعم للسلام . ف نعم للدولة الفلسطينة.ف"	"Yes to equality. Yes to peace. Yes to a Palestinian state."
Yahad	אני מאמין בוויצמן!	"I trust Weizman!"
Yahad	أنا أؤمن بويزمان!	"I trust Weizman!"

=== Surplus-vote agreements ===
Two parties could make a surplus-vote agreement so that they were considered to be running on a joint list when leftover seats were distributed. The Bader–Ofer method favors larger lists, meaning that a joint list is more likely to receive leftover seats than each list would individually. If such a joint list were to receive a leftover seat, the Bader–Ofer method would be applied a second time to determine which of the parties that make up the joint list would receive it. The following agreements were signed by parties prior to the election:

- Alignment - Ratz
- Shas - Agudat Yisrael
- Shinui - Yahad
- Likud - Tehiya-Tzomet

== Opinion polls ==
The parties can be grouped by the Israel Broadcasting Authority's bloc classification:

- Left-wing:
  - Jewish: Alignment, Ratz, Shinui, Yahad (retroactively), Aryeh Eliav List
  - Sheli
  - Arab: Hadash, PLFP
- Yahad
- Right-wing:
  - Secular: Likud, Tehiya, Telem, Ometz, Movement for the Renewal of Social Zionism (MRSZ). Hadashot also included Kach in this grouping.
  - Religious: Agudat Yisrael, Shas, Tami, Mafdal, Morasha

=== Seat projections ===
Note: Political blocs do not necessarily determine the exact makeup of post-election coalitions. Hadashot published most polls in percentages, which have been approximated into seat totals through the D'Hondt method, assuming surplus-vote agreements stay the same when possible.

Date	Poll client	Likud	Alignment	Mafdal	Agudat Yisrael	Hadash	PLFP	Tehiya	Tami	Telem	Shinui	Ratz	Shas	Yahad	Morasha	Kach	Ometz	MRSZ	Sheli	Aryeh Eliav	Others	Lead	Left	Right	Lead
Final results		41	44	4	2	4	2	5	1	defunct	3	3	4	3	2	1	1	0	defunct	0	0	3	59	61	8
23 July 1984	Exit poll on Channel 1	43	46	5	2	4	1	3	1	defunct	4	3	3	2	2	1	0	0	defunct	0	0	3	60	60	Tie
22 July 1984	Hadashot	39	53	4	-	-	-	6	-	defunct	5		-	1	-	-	-	1	-	-	-	14	59	52	
20 July 1984	Alignment	40	52	4	-	4		7		defunct	6		-	4	-	-	1	0	-	0	-	13	66	54	12
20 July 1984	Davar	37	53	4	3	3.5	-	5	2	defunct	2	2		5	2	-	-	-	-	-		16	65.5	N/A	
20 July 1984	Hadashot	40	52	4.5	4	-	-	6.5	-	defunct	-	3	-	-	-	-	-	-	-		13	12	55	42	13
17 July 1984	Ma'ariv	36	52	4	2	5		6	1	defunct	2.5	3	2	3	2	~1	1	-	-	0.5	-	18	66	54	12
17 July 1984	Davar	36	52	4	2	3	1	6	-	defunct	2.5	3	2	3	2	0	1	0		0	-	16	64.5	55.5	9
19 June 1984	Hadashot	40	59	4		4		4	-	defunct	3	1	-	2	-	-	-	-	-	0	3	19	69	48	21
23 May 1984	Hadashot	30	60	5		4		6	-	defunct	2	2	-	4	-	-	-	-	-	0	8	30	72	40	32
11 May 1984	Hadashot	29	58	3	0.9%	4		6	-	defunct	2	2	-	3	-	-	-	-	0.2%	-	8	29	69	43	26
Outgoing Knesset		46	49	6	4	4	-	3	3	defunct	2	1	-	-	-	-	1	1		-	0	3	56	64	8
1981 results		48	47	6	4	4	-	3	3	2	2	1	-	-	-	0.3%	-	-	0.5%	-	0	1	54	66	12

A hypothetical poll was conducted on 14 May 1984, where people were asked who they would vote for in the event of Likud splitting back into Herut and the Liberals. 18.4% of people would have voted for Herut and 2.3% for the Liberals.

=== Leadership polling ===
Date	Poll client	Rabin	Navon	Peres	Weizman	Sharon	Shamir
16 November 1981	Davar	27.3%	15.4%	13.2%	12.9%	12.1%	4.6%

== Results ==
Party	Votes	%	Seats	+/–
Alignment	724,074	34.92	44	−3
Likud	661,302	31.90	41	−7
Tehiya–Tzomet	83,037	4.01	5	+2
National Religious Party	73,530	3.55	4	−2
Hadash	69,815	3.37	4	0
Shas	63,605	3.07	4	New
Shinui	54,747	2.64	3	+1
Ratz	49,698	2.40	3	+2
Yahad	46,302	2.23	3	New
Progressive List for Peace	38,012	1.83	2	New
Agudat Yisrael	36,079	1.74	2	−2
Morasha	33,287	1.61	2	New
Tami	31,103	1.50	1	−2
Kach	25,907	1.25	1	+1
Ometz	23,845	1.15	1	New
Aryeh Eliav	15,348	0.74	0	New
Handicapped Organisation	12,329	0.59	0	New
Movement for the Renewal of Social Zionism	5,876	0.28	0	New
Aliyah and Youth Movement	5,794	0.28	0	New
Shiluv	5,499	0.27	0	New
Independence	4,887	0.24	0	New
National Organisation for the Defence of the Tenant	3,195	0.15	0	New
Development and Peace	2,430	0.12	0	0
Has Mas	1,472	0.07	0	New
Movement for the Homeland	1,415	0.07	0	New
Amkha	733	0.04	0	0
Total	2,073,321	100.00	120	0
Valid votes	2,073,321	99.14		
Invalid/blank votes	18,081	0.86		
Total votes	2,091,402	100.00		
Registered voters/turnout	2,654,613	78.78		
Source: IDI, Nohlen et al.

== Aftermath ==
Hadash lost 4% of the Arab vote, going from 38.1% to 34.1%. The Alignment dropped from 29% to 22.5%, and the Likud from 7% to 4.6%. Yahad won 5.9% of Arab votes, Shinui won 5.2% (the same as in 1981), Mafdal won 4.2%, Yahad won 5.9% and the Progressives won 18.2%.

The Alignment won 19% of the Druze vote, a drop from 30% in 1981. Likud fell from 35.5% to 19.2%. Shinui won out, with 24.5% of Druze votes compared to 7.5% in 1981.

The Alignment and the Likud remained steady in the Bedouin community; they won 49.2 and 10.3% respectively, close to their 1981 vote totals. Hadash fell from 10.5% to 4.4%. The Progressives won 10.1%.

While the right-leaning parties had 61 seats, they could not form another government, as the presence of Kach in a coalition was untenable. Likud's attempt to invite Yahad into a coalition failed. Yahad, as well as centre-right Ometz, backed Shimon Peres's nomination to form a government, along with the Alignment itself, Ratz, Hadash, the Progressives and Shinui, a group of 60 MKs. The Likud, Tehiya, Shas, Agudat Yisrael, and Morasha, who had 54 MKs together, supported Yitzhak Shamir to be nominated. Mafdal and Tami's sole MK, Aharon Abuhatzira, supported a broad government, while Meir Kahane was not invited to the session. Mafdal offered to join a Peres-led coalition to displace Shas as the potential party in charge of the Ministry of Religious Affairs, but only on the condition that the Arab parties be dropped, which was not numerically possible. President Chaim Herzog, with the advice of Yahad leader Ezer Weizman, facilitated the formation of a national unity government, with the Alignment and Likud holding the leadership for two years each. The Alignment's Shimon Peres formed the twenty-first government on 13 September 1984. Alongside the Alignment and Likud, the coalition government included the National Religious Party, Yahad, Agudat Yisrael, Shas, Morasha, Shinui and Ometz. However, once this government was announced, Mapam and its six MKs quit the Alignment, as did Yossi Sarid, who defected to Ratz. Outside national unity governments formed during wartime (notably the government formed during the Six-Day War in the term of the sixth Knesset, which had 111 MKs), it was the largest-ever coalition in Israeli political history, with 97 MKs.

In accordance with the rotation agreement, Peres resigned in 1986 and Likud's Yitzhak Shamir formed the twenty-second government on 20 October 1986. Shinui left the coalition on 26 May 1987.

The eleventh Knesset also contained two controversial parties, Kach and the Progressive List for Peace (PLFP). Kach was a far-right party that advocated the expulsion of most Israeli Arabs, and although it had run in previous elections, it had not passed the electoral threshold. Ultimately the party was banned after a law was passed barring parties that incited racism. The attempts made to stop Kach from competing in the next elections also affected the PLFP, as the addition of section 7a to the Basic Law dealing with the Knesset ("Prevention of Participation of Candidates List") included the banning of parties that denied Israel's existence as a Jewish state:

A candidates' list shall not participate in elections to the Knesset if its objects or actions, expressly or by implication, include one of the following... negation of the existence of the State of Israel as the state of the Jewish people.

On this basis, the Central Elections Committee initially banned the PLFP from running for the 1988 elections, arguing that its policies promoted the scrapping of Israel as a Jewish state. However, the decision was eventually overturned by the Supreme Court of Israel, and the party was able to compete in the elections, winning two seats. Nevertheless, the law was not overturned, the Supreme Court merely deciding it was impossible to determine if "the real, central and active purpose [of the PFLP] is to bring about the elimination of the State of Israel as the state of the Jewish people", and attempts were made to ban the Israeli Arab parties Balad (PFLP's partial successor) and Ta'al using the same law prior to the 2003 elections.

During the Knesset term nine MKs left the Alignment; Mapam's six, Yossi Sarid for Ratz, Abdulwahab Darawshe to establish the Arab Democratic Party, and Yitzhak Artzi to Shinui. The Alignment also gained three MKs when Yahad merged into it.

Ometz and Tami merged into Likud. Mordechai Virshubski defected from Shinui to Ratz. Rafael Eitan formally merged Tehiya with his Tzomet in 1986, but pulled Tzomet out of the merger and the parliamentary group altogether in 1987. Haim Drukman defected from Morasha to the National Religious Party. Shimon Ben-Shlomo broke away from Shas to sit as an independent.

== See also ==
- 1984 Herut leadership election
- 1984 Israeli Labor Party leadership election
- Party lists for the 1984 Israeli legislative election
