= Party lists for the 1988 Israeli legislative election =

The 1988 Israeli legislative election was held using closed list proportional representation. Each party presented a list of candidates to the Central Elections Committee prior to the election.

== Likud ==
The Likud list was led by Yitzhak Shamir.

1. Yitzhak Shamir
2. David Levy
3. Yitzhak Moda'i
4. Ariel Sharon
5. Moshe Arens
6. Yigal Horowitz
7. Moshe Nissim
8. Moshe Katsav
9. Benjamin Netanyahu
10. Avraham Sharir
11. David Magen
12. Aharon Abuhatzira
13. Benny Begin
14. Dan Tichon
15. Dan Meridor
16. Eliyahu Ben-Elissar
17. Gideon Patt
18. Ya'akov Shamai
19. Roni Milo
20. Pinhas Goldstein
21. Haim Corfu
22. Ehud Olmert
23. Uriel Lynn
24. Ovadia Eli
25. Michael Reisser
26. Ariel Weinstein
27. Reuven Rivlin
28. Yigal Cohen
29. Yehuda Perah
30. Michael Eitan
31. Yehoshua Matza
32. Yosef Goldberg
33. Gideon Gadot
34. Dov Shilansky
35. Pesach Grupper
36. Uzi Landau
37. Tzachi Hanegbi
38. Shaul Amor
39. Sarah Doron
40. Zalman Shoval
41. Yehoshua Sagi
42. Michael Kleiner
43. Haim Kaufman
44. Limor Livnat
45. Eliezer Kulas
46. Israel Katz
47. Moshe Rom
48. Daniel Azriel
49. David Mena
50. Miriam Glazer-Ta'asa
51. Michael Ratzon
52. Moshe Lipka
53. Avraham Hirschson
54. Eli Landau
55. Haim Perlok
56. Amal Nasser el-Din
57. Rachel Kremerman
58. Yitzhak Katbi
59. Muhammad Mulla
60. Ayoob Kara
61. Aaron Pappo
62. Rafi Duek
63. Yedidia Be'eri
64. Avraham Rona'i
65. Ariella Ravdel
66. Yitzhak Ben Gad
67. David Hagoel
68. David Mor
69. Uri Oren
70. Andrey Ozen
71. Akiva Nof
72. Gad Asulin
73. Shalom Fitchezda
74. Shlomo Levanoni
75. Shlomo Tal
76. Herzl Makov
77. Avraham Yoel
78. Yona Barazani
79. Ezra Mualem
80. Elyakim Badian

== Alignment ==
The Alignment, an alliance between the Israeli Labor Party and the Independent Liberals, was led by Shimon Peres.

1. Shimon Peres
2. Yitzhak Rabin
3. Yitzhak Navon
4. Yisrael Kessar
5. Ezer Weizmann
6. Shlomo Hillel
7. Uzi Baram
8. Moshe Shahal
9. Ora Namir
10. Shoshana Arbeli-Almozlino
11. Gad Yaacobi
12. Ya'akov Tzur
13. Mordechai Gur
14. Haim Ramon
15. Avraham Katz-Oz
16. David Libai
17. Haim Bar-Lev
18. Amir Peretz
19. Rafael Edri
20. Aryeh Eliav
21. Avraham Burg
22. Avraham Shochat
23. Shimon Sheetrit
24. Michael Harish
25. Binyamin Ben-Eliezer
26. Eli Dayan
27. Nava Arad
28. Yossi Beilin
29. Gedalia Gal
30. Shevah Weiss
31. Eli Ben-Menachem
32. Michael Bar-Zohar
33. Emanuel Zisman
34. Efraim Gur
35. Nawaf Massalha
36. Hagai Meirom
37. Ra'anan Cohen
38. Micha Goldman
39. Edna Solodar
40. Salah Tarif
41. Shlomo Amar
42. Efraim Feinelbaum
43. Yehiel Leket
44. Yosef Bar-Zion
45. Yitzhak Elishiv
46. Nelly Karkavi
47. Menachem Ariev
48. Baruch Wanger
49. Shmuel Bahat
50. Zecharia Nissim
51. David Levy
52. Efraim Zinger
53. Sarah Alspector
54. Mordechai Hod
55. Dov Garfunkel
56. Shlomo Bohbot
57. Yaakov Gal
58. Menachem Gilad
59. Efraim Bulmash
60. Yemin Suissa
61. Yehuda Doron
62. Yekutiel Sharabi
63. Doron Shorer
64. Younis Abu-Rabiyya
65. Liora Langer
66. Aharon Yadlin
67. Yeshayahu Perry
68. Ori Orr
69. Daniel Yochanan
70. Michael Sarussi
71. Hanita Atias-Keidar
72. Saadia Marciano
73. Baruch Elmaikes
74. Yael Dayan
75. Ya'akov Shefi
76. Michael Peron
77. Yosef Tzedaka
78. Shaul Ben Simhon
79. Yoram Oberkovich
80. Yosef Horowitz

== Shas ==
The Shas list was led by Yitzhak Peretz.

1. Yitzhak Peretz
2. Rafael Pinhasi
3. Yosef Azran
4. Aryeh Gamliel
5. Yair Levy
6. Shlomo Dayan
7. Moshe Almaliah
8. Mordechai Huri
9. Yaakov Amar
10. Zerah Meshulam
11. Binyamin Elias
12. Yitzhak Dayan
13. Eliyahu Sabag
14. Moshe Mashiah
15. Yitzhak Cohen

== Agudat Yisrael ==
The Agudat Yisrael list was led by Moshe Ze'ev Feldman.

1. Moshe Ze'ev Feldman
2. Menachem Porush
3. Avraham Verdiger
4. Shmuel Halpert
5. Eliezer Mizrahi
6. David Halachmi
7. Avraham Rabinowitz
8. Meir Luria
9. Ya'akov Ktzanlenburger
10. Baruch Waltzer

== Ratz ==
The Ratz list was led by Shulamit Aloni.

1. Shulamit Aloni
2. Yossi Sarid
3. Ran Cohen
4. David Zucker
5. Mordechai Virshubski
6. Najib Abu-Rakya
7. Rachel Alterman
8. Binyamin Temkin
9. Rafael Zagury
10. Tawfiq Zidan

== National Religious Party ==
The National Religious Party list was led by Avner Shaki.

1. Avner Shaki
2. Zevulun Hammer
3. Hanan Porat
4. Yigal Bibi
5. Yitzhak Levy
6. Shmaryahu Ben-Tzur
7. Yehudith Huebner
8. David Danino
9. Avraham Melamed
10. Boaz Levy

== Hadash ==
The Hadash list was led by Meir Vilner.

1. Meir Vilner
2. Tawfik Toubi
3. Charlie Biton
4. Tawfiq Ziad
5. Hashem Mahameed
6. Mohamed Nafa
7. Tamar Gozansky
8. Salam Jubran
9. Binyamin Gonen
10. Hajj Yahya Abed Al-Jawwad

== Tehiya ==
The Tehiya list was led by Yuval Ne'eman.

1. Yuval Ne'eman
2. Geulah Cohen
3. Eliezer Waldman
4. Gershon Shafat
5. Elyakim Haetzni
6. Benny Katzover
7. Avraham Farhan
8. Ezra Sadan
9. Daniel Dayan
10. Efraim Ben-Haim

== Mapam ==
The Mapam list was led by Yair Tzaban.

1. Yair Tzaban
2. Haim Oron
3. Hussein Faris
4. Amira Sartani
5. Gadi Yatziv
6. Ilan Gilon
7. Pini Gruv
8. Yosef Marciano
9. Giora Ram-Furman
10. Mufaraj Salhala

== Tzomet ==
The Tzomet list was led by Rafael Eitan.

1. Rafael Eitan
2. Yoash Tzidon
3. Yaakov Tuvia
4. Rami Michaeli
5. Eliezer Golan
6. Yael Michaeli
7. Dan Rom
8. Martin-Robert Sherman
9. Eliezer Argaman
10. Mordell Georg

== Moledet ==
The Moledet list wasa led by Rehavam Ze'evi.

1. Rehavam Ze'evi
2. Yair Sprinzak
3. Akhsa Lapid
4. Yosef Coller
5. Gideon Raski
6. Ze'ev Karuz
7. Ofer Babiof
8. Edel Blitantel
9. Ofir Haivry
10. Uri Yarom

== Shinui ==
The Shinui list was led by Amnon Rubinstein.

1. Amnon Rubinstein
2. Avraham Poraz
3. Zvi Nir
4. Zeidan Atashi
5. Moshe Becker
6. Eliezer Glaubach
7. Moshe Sagi
8. Israel Vinbaum
9. Michael Tausing
10. Haim Ashael

== Degel HaTorah ==
The Degel HaTorah list was led by Avraham Ravitz.

1. Avraham Ravitz
2. Moshe Gafni
3. Yosef Brilant
4. Shalom Zalman Kahanovich
5. Yisrael Gans
6. Eliyahu Essas
7. Efraim Tzemel
8. Mordechai Lasker
9. Yosef Brooke
10. Moshe Schlezinger

== Progressive List for Peace ==
The Progressive List for Peace was led by Mohammed Miari.

1. Mohammed Miari
2. Matti Peled
3. Abu El-Assel Riah
4. Bader Younis
5. Haim Hanegbi

== Arab Democratic Party ==
The Arab Democratic Party was led by Abdulwahab Darawshe.

1. Abdulwahab Darawshe
2. Ahmad Abu-Asba
3. Taleb el-Sana
4. Fahad Hussein
5. Mohammed Abu-Ghosh

== Extraparliamentary parties ==
The following are parties which won no seats in the 1988 election.

=== Pensioners ===
The Pensioners list was led by Aba Gefen.

1. Aba Gefen
2. Shlomo Dion
3. Yigal Mossinson
4. Ben-Zion Feirman

=== Meimad ===
The Meimad list was led by Yehuda Amital.

1. Yehuda Amital
2. Haim Riefel
3. Tova Ilan
4. Shalom Rosenberg

=== Derekh Aretz ===
Not to be confused with Derekh Eretz, The Derekh Aretz list was led by Naftali Dov Orbach.

1. Naftali Dov Orbach
2. Nabil Kablan
3. Gino Urbinio
4. Nasser Ebla

=== LeOrr Movement ===
The LeOrr Movement list was led by Ya'akov Hasdai.

1. Ya'akov Hasdai
2. Yeshaya Ben-Yehuda
3. Bracha Yehoshefat-Ronen
4. Ilana Shemesh

=== Movement for Social Justice ===
The Movement for Social Justice list was led by Rafael Suissa.

1. Rafael Suissa
2. Eli Cohen
3. Giora Zilberstein
4. Adina Tamir

=== Yishai ===
The Yishai list was led by Shimon Ben-Shlomo.

1. Shimon Ben-Shlomo
2. Haim Ben-Avraham
3. Yosef Melamed
4. Pinhas Yitzhak Halevy

=== Movement for Moshavim ===
The Movement for Moshavim list was led by Ra'anan Naim.

1. Ra'anan Naim
2. Shmuel Ohana
3. Shimon Adar
4. Shimon Mor Yosef

=== Tarshish ===
The Tarshish list was led by Moshe Dwek, who was also its sole member.

=== Silent Power ===
The Silent Power list was led by David Sanhi.

1. David Sanhi
2. Ya'akov Gross
3. Mordechai Shabtai
4. Dalia Hibner

=== Movement for Discharged Soldiers ===
The Movement for Discharged list has two members, its leader Bentzi Koren, as well as Eliyahu Dor Avraham.

=== Yemenite Association ===
The Yemenite Association list was led by Shalom Mantzura.

1. Shalom Mantzura
2. Israel Nahum
3. Haim Mantzur
4. Abigail Bar-Kokhba

=== Unity ===
The Unity list was led by Victor Tayar, who was also its sole member.
