= List of members of the eleventh Knesset =

The 120 members of the eleventh Knesset were elected on 23 July 1984. The breakdown by party was as follows:

- Alignment: 44
- Likud: 41
- Tehiya: 5
- National Religious Party: 4
- Hadash: 4
- Shas: 4
- Shinui: 3
- Ratz: 3
- Yahad: 3
- Progressive List for Peace: 2
- Agudat Yisrael: 2
- Morasha: 2
- Tami: 1
- Kach: 1
- Ometz: 1

== List of members ==
Member	Party	Notes
Jacques Amir	Alignment	
Adiel Amorai	Alignment	
Nava Arad	Alignment	
Shoshana Arbeli-Almozlino	Alignment	
Yitzhak Artzi	Alignment	Left party to join Shinui
Haim Bar-Lev	Alignment	
Uzi Baram	Alignment	
Dov Ben-Meir	Alignment	
Abdulwahab Darawshe	Alignment	Left party to sit as an independent, before forming the Arab Democratic Party
Simcha Dinitz	Alignment	
Abba Eban	Alignment	
Rafael Edri	Alignment	
Elazar Granot	Alignment	Mapam broke away from the Alignment
Haika Grossman	Alignment	Mapam broke away from the Alignment
Mordechai Gur	Alignment	
Menachem Hacohen	Alignment	
Aharon Harel	Alignment	
Michael Harish	Alignment	
Shlomo Hillel	Alignment	
Avraham Katz-Oz	Alignment	
Yisrael Kessar	Alignment	
David Libai	Alignment	
Amnon Linn	Alignment	
Aharon Nahmias	Alignment	
Ora Namir	Alignment	
Yitzhak Navon	Alignment	
Aryeh Nehemkin	Alignment	
Shimon Peres	Alignment	
Yitzhak Peretz	Alignment	
Yitzhak Rabin	Alignment	
Haim Ramon	Alignment	
Nahman Raz	Alignment	
Yossi Sarid	Alignment	Left party to join Ratz
Amira Sartani	Alignment	Mapam broke away from the Alignment
Moshe Shahal	Alignment	
Efraim Shalom	Alignment	
Victor Shem-Tov	Alignment	Mapam broke away from the Alignment
Edna Solodar	Alignment	
Eliyahu Speiser	Alignment	
Yair Tzaban	Alignment	Mapam broke away from the Alignment
Ya'akov Tzur	Alignment	
Muhammed Wattad	Alignment	Mapam broke away from the Alignment, later left Mapam to join Hadash
Shevah Weiss	Alignment	
Gad Yaacobi	Alignment	
Moshe Arens	Likud	
Yoram Aridor	Likud	
Eliyahu Ben-Elissar	Likud	
Meir Cohen-Avidov	Likud	
Yigal Cohen-Orgad	Likud	
Yigal Cohen	Likud	
Haim Corfu	Likud	
Michael Dekel	Likud	
Sarah Doron	Likud	
Michael Eitan	Likud	
Ovadia Eli	Likud	
Gideon Gadot	Likud	
Miriam Glazer-Ta'asa	Likud	
Pinchas Goldstein	Likud	
Pesah Grupper	Likud	
Moshe Katsav	Likud	
Haim Kaufman	Likud	
Eliezer Kulas	Likud	
Uzi Landau	Likud	
David Levy	Likud	
Uriel Lynn	Likud	
David Magen	Likud	
Joshua Matza	Likud	
Dan Meridor	Likud	
Roni Milo	Likud	
Yitzhak Moda'i	Likud	
Amal Nasser el-Din	Likud	
Moshe Nissim	Likud	
Ehud Olmert	Likud	
Gideon Patt	Likud	
Michael Reisser	Likud	
Yitzhak Seiger	Likud	
Benny Shalita	Likud	
Yitzhak Shamir	Likud	
Avraham Sharir	Likud	
Ariel Sharon	Likud	
Meir Sheetrit	Likud	
Dov Shilansky	Likud	
Eliezer Shostak	Likud	
Dan Tichon	Likud	
Ariel Weinstein	Likud	
Rafael Eitan	Tehiya	Left party to sit as an independent, later formed Tzomet
Geula Cohen	Tehiya	
Yuval Ne'eman	Tehiya	
Gershon Shafat	Tehiya	
Eliezer Waldman	Tehiya	
Yosef Burg	National Religious Party	
David Danino	National Religious Party	
Zevulun Hammer	National Religious Party	
Avner Shaki	National Religious Party	
Charlie Biton	Hadash	
Tawfik Toubi	Hadash	
Meir Vilner	Hadash	
Tawfiq Ziad	Hadash	
Yitzhak Peretz	Shas	
Rafael Pinhasi	Shas	
Ya'akov Yosef	Shas	
Shimon Ben-Shlomo	Shas	Left party to sit as an independent
Zeidan Atashi	Shinui	
Amnon Rubinstein	Shinui	
Mordechai Virshubski	Shinui	Left party to join Ratz
Shulamit Aloni	Ratz	
Mordechai Bar-On	Ratz	
Ran Cohen	Ratz	
Shlomo Amar	Yahad	Party merged into the Alignment
Binyamin Ben-Eliezer	Yahad	Party merged into the Alignment
Ezer Weizman	Yahad	Party merged into the Alignment
Mohammed Miari	Progressive List for Peace	
Mattityahu Peled	Progressive List for Peace	
Menachem Porush	Agudat Yisrael	
Avraham Yosef Shapira	Agudat Yisrael	
Haim Drukman	Morasha	Left party to join the National Religious Party
Avraham Verdiger	Morasha	
Meir Kahane	Kach	
Aharon Abuhatzira	Tami	Party merged into Likud
Yigal Hurvitz	Ometz	Party merged into Likud

=== Replacements ===
MK	Replaced	Date	Party	Notes
Ya'akov Shamai	Yitzhak Seiger	5 February 1985	Likud	
David Zucker	Mordechai Bar-On	26 November 1986	Ratz	
Ya'akov Gil	Simcha Dinitz	13 March 1988	Alignment	
Gadi Yatziv	Victor Shem-Tov	15 March 1988	Mapam	
Avraham Shochat	Aharon Harel	10 May 1988	Alignment	
David Mor	Michael Reisser	27 October 1988	Likud	
Uri Sebag	Adiel Amorai	31 October 1988	Alignment	
