= Suissa =

Suissa is a surname. Notable people with the surname include:

- Danièle J. Suissa, Canadian actress
- Eli Suissa (born 1956), Israeli politician
- Justine Suissa (born 1970), British singer-songwriter
- Rafael Suissa (born 1935), Israeli politician
- Steve Suissa (born 1970), French film director and actor
