= Aba Gefen =

Israeli Diplomat

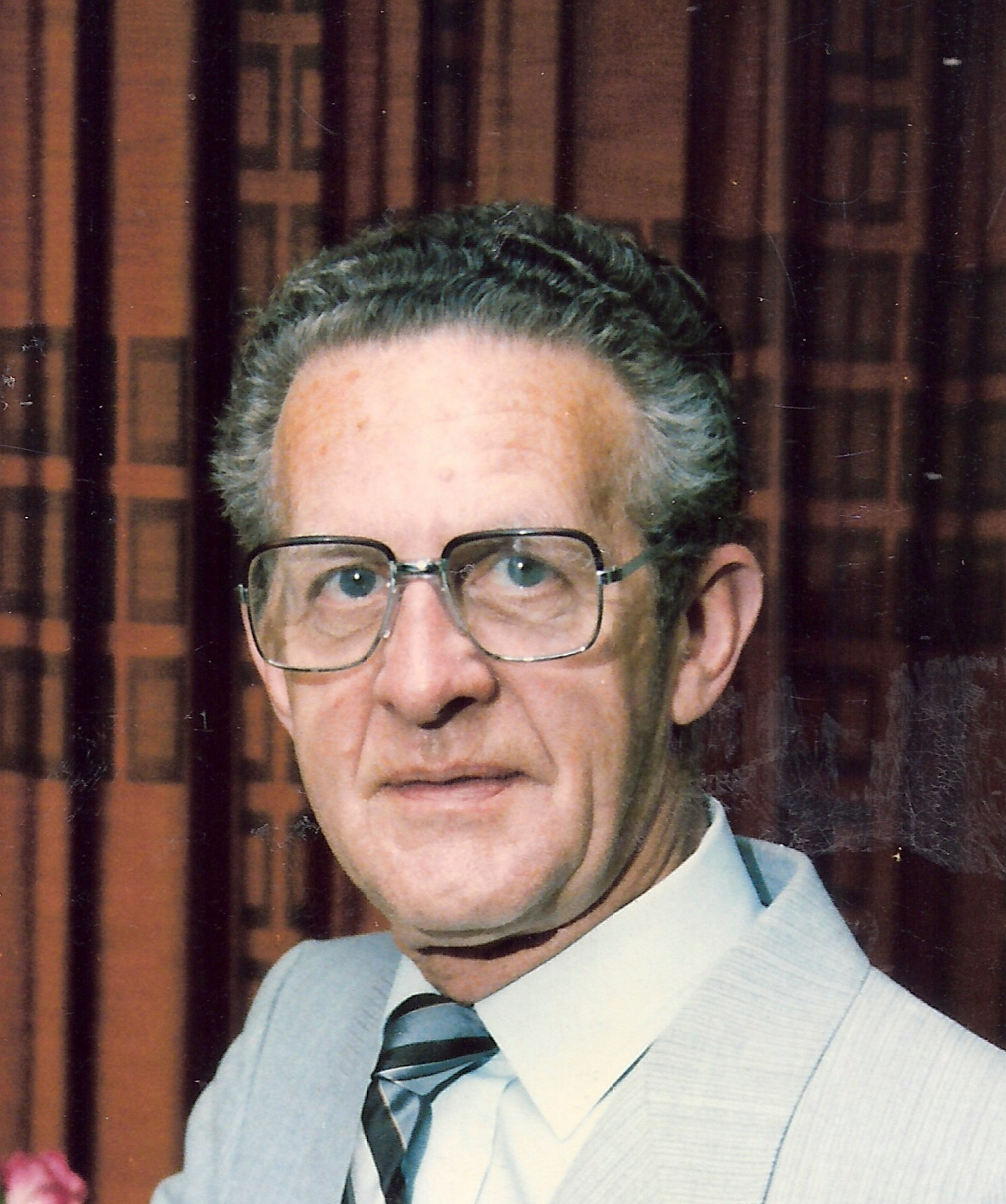
- Born: Aba Weinstein; May 31, 1922; Marijampolė, Lithuania
- Died: September 6, 2015 (aged 93)
- Occupation: Diplomat

Aba Gefen (May 31, 1922 – September 6, 2015) was an Israeli diplomat who served in the Israeli Foreign Service for more than 35 years. He held diplomatic posts in Italy, Peru, Argentina, Canada, and served as Israel's ambassador to Romania from 1977 to 1982. Born Aba Weinstein in Marijampolė, Lithuania, Gefen survived the Holocaust after spending three years in hiding with his brother Yosef. After World War II, he became active in the Bricha movement, helping Jewish refugees reach the Displaced Persons Camps and travel toward Eretz Israel, which was then Mandatory Palestine. He later served in Israel's intelligence community before joining the Ministry of Foreign Affairs. Gefen also wrote books about his experiences during the Holocaust, the Bricha movement, Israeli diplomacy, and political affairs.

== Early life and education ==
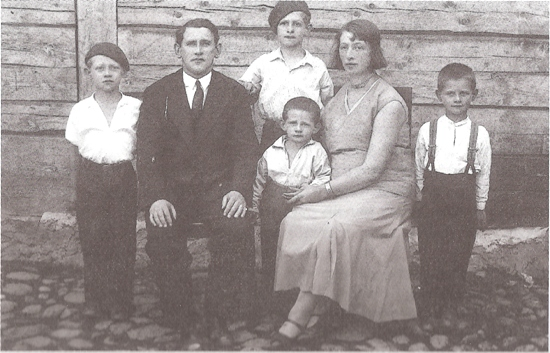
The Gefen family in Simna

Aba Gefen was born as Aba Weinstein in 1922 in Marijampolė, Lithuania, the eldest son of Meir Weinstein, a textile merchant, and Ruhama, née Rubinstein. He had three siblings, and his family lived in the town of Simnas. He attended the Hebrew Gymnasium in Marijampolė. After completing high school, he began studying civil engineering at the University of Kaunas.

== The Holocaust Period ==
Even before German forces entered Kaunas in June 1941, persecution and killing of the city's Jewish population began, led by the Lithuanian Activist Front, a Lithuanian Nationalist movement. On June 24, thousands of Jews were rounded up in the Kaunas Rotušės Square, and from there taken to the Seventh Fort and the Ninth Fort and murdered within a few weeks. Gefen survived thanks to the help of Zina Blumenthal, the wife of Colonel Adolf Blumenthal, who was a Jewish officer in the Lithuanian Air Force. The Colonel and his family were released from the square by a Lithuanian Air Force officer who knew him. Gefen was renting a room from the Blumenthal family at the time. Ms. Blumenthal spotted him in the crowd and obtained permission for him to join them.

Gefen then walked to Simnas to join his family. In August of that year, the Nazis, together with numerous Lithuanian collaborators, began carrying out systematic killings of Jews in Simnas. In the first such event, his father, Meir, and his brother, Benjamin, were taken to the provincial town of Alytus, where they were shot. On September 12, 1941, the Germans and their collaborators murdered most of the remaining Jews in the town, including Gefen's mother and his younger brother, Yehuda, aged 11.

Gefen and his remaining brother, Yosef, aged 15, fled and spent approximately three years hiding in the homes of local farmers.To some of these rescuers he also brought for sheltering Jews who had escaped from Kaunas Ghetto. Gefen kept a diary in Hebrew with a description of what happened to the two brothers, their thoughts, their struggles, and a record of the assistance they received from each of the families. Some of these were later recognized by Yad Vashem as Righteous Among the Nations. The original diary is preserved in the Yad Vashem Archives, and a copy is held by the United States Holocaust Memorial Museum in Washington. The diary was translated into five additional languages.

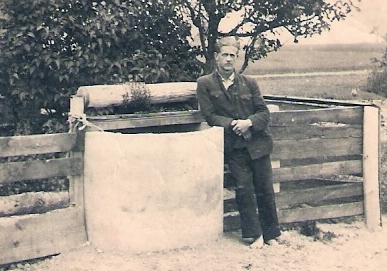
Gefen during the War

On July 29, 1944, Gefen and his brother emerged from hiding following the arrival of Soviet forces.

After he was freed, Gefen remained in Lithuania for approximately a year and joined the Soviet security services. He identified and brought to justice Lithuanian collaborators with the Nazis, including people who participated in the persecution and murder of Jews.

== The Bricha Movement ==
Gefen joined the Bricha Movement in Austria and served as the Bricha movement's commander in Salzburg for two years. Salzburg was a major transit center for the Bricha. Between 1945 and 1948, approximately 120,000–125,000 Jewish refugees passed through Salzburg or were temporarily sheltered there. The refugees were directed toward displaced-persons camps in Austria and Germany or onward routes through Italy, from where many hoped to reach Eretz Israel. In addition, the Bricha, together with UNRRA, the JOINT and assistance from the US Army, managed several Displaced Persons Camps and Transition Camps.

As part of Gefen's activity in Salzburg he established close relations with the US Army authorities, especially with Captain Stanley M. Nowinski, an officer in the 42nd Division, who had been part of the forces that liberated the Dachau concentration camp and was in charge of dealing with DPs (Displaced Persons) in the American Occupation Zone in Austria. Gefen's cooperation with U.S. Army authorities led to the establishment of the Committee for Assistance to Jewish Refugees (CAJR), through which Bricha activists operated with recognition from the U.S. Army. Gefen received a certificate from the army that he was the chairman of the CAJR, which constituted for him and other Bricha activists permission to wear uniform and to cross borders.

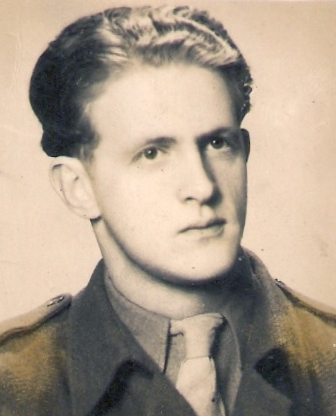
In the Bricha Service - in CAJR uniform

The U.S. Army also provided the Bricha in Salzburg with facilities and communications support, including a military telephone line that enabled contact with Bricha centers elsewhere in Europe.

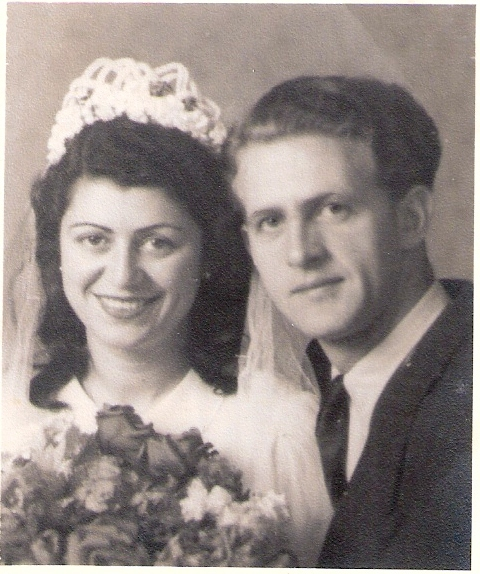
Wedding picture

Among the refugees who passed through Salzburg was Frida Szmuilowicz, whom Gefen met at the Bad Reichenhall displaced persons camp. They married in Salzburg in 1947.

== Israeli career ==
Following the United Nations partition resolution of November 29, 1947, Gefen and his wife entered Mandatory Palestine using forged passports and settled in Haifa. Gefen began working at the Haifa Port as a cargo clerk.

In 1950, he was approached by his former commander in the Bricha movement, Asher Ben Natan, who was head of Israeli intelligence in Europe, and was recruited to serve in Rome on behalf of the Mossad. Gefen spent four years in Italy, the last two as head of the Mossad office in Italy. During this period, he was involved in the operation that exposed Ted Cross (David Magen), an Israeli agent accused of working as a double agent. While in Rome, Gefen studied at Sapienza University of Rome and earned a doctorate for research on "The State of Israel and its Declaration of Independence".

In 1954 he returned to Israel and joined the Ministry of Foreign Affairs in Jerusalem.

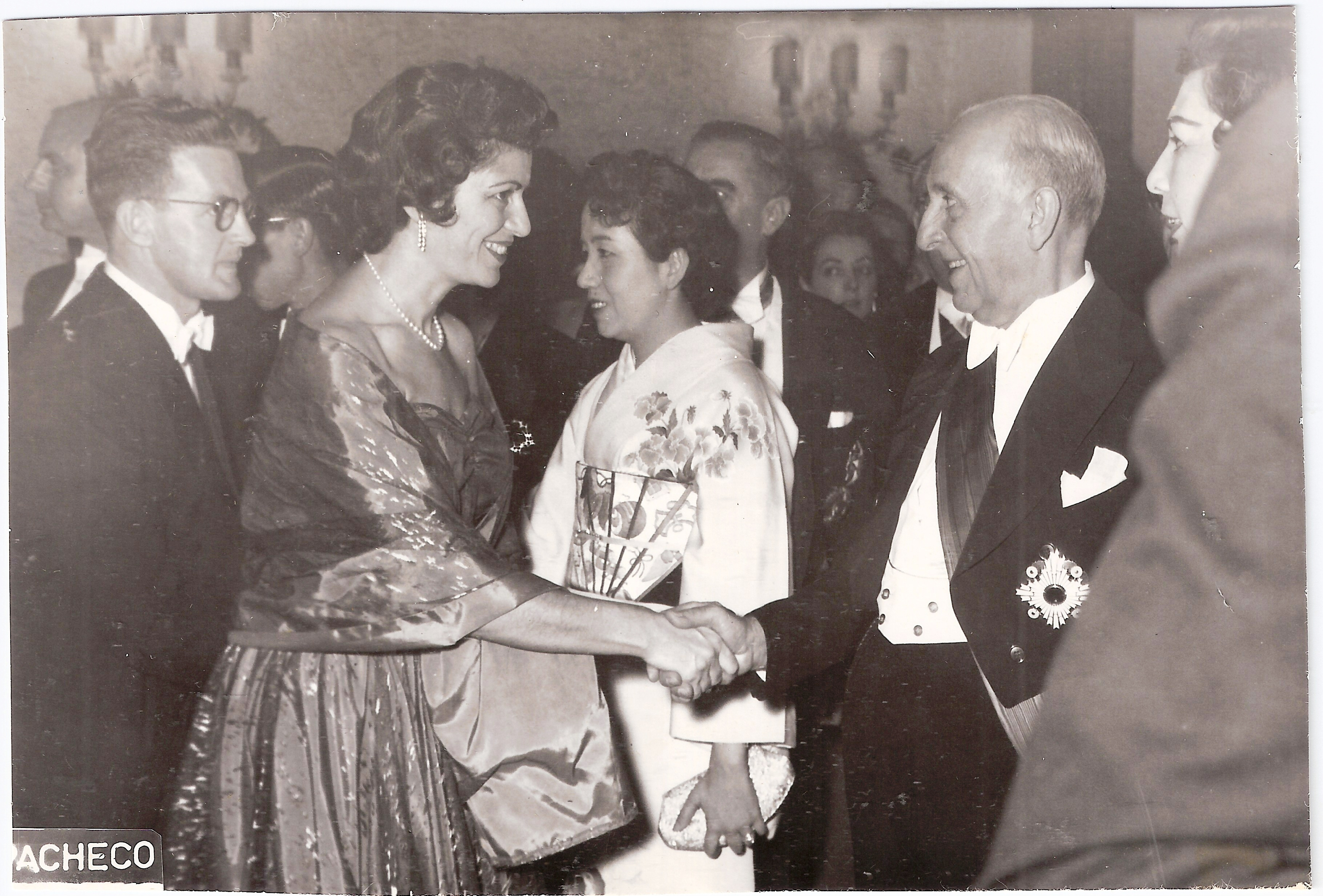
Aba and Frida Gefen in a meeting with the President of Peru.

From 1957 to 1959 he served as First Secretary at the Israeli Embassy in Lima, Peru. From 1963 to 1967 he served as Political Counselor at the Israeli Embassy in Buenos Aires, acting also as Chargé d’Affaires during part of 1965. From 1967 to 1971 he served as Consul General in Toronto, Canada. His final diplomatic posting abroad was as Israel's ambassador to Romania, from 1978 to 1982. His appointment was the first ambassadorship position made by the government of Menachem Begin, who became Prime Minister of Israel after the May 1977 elections.

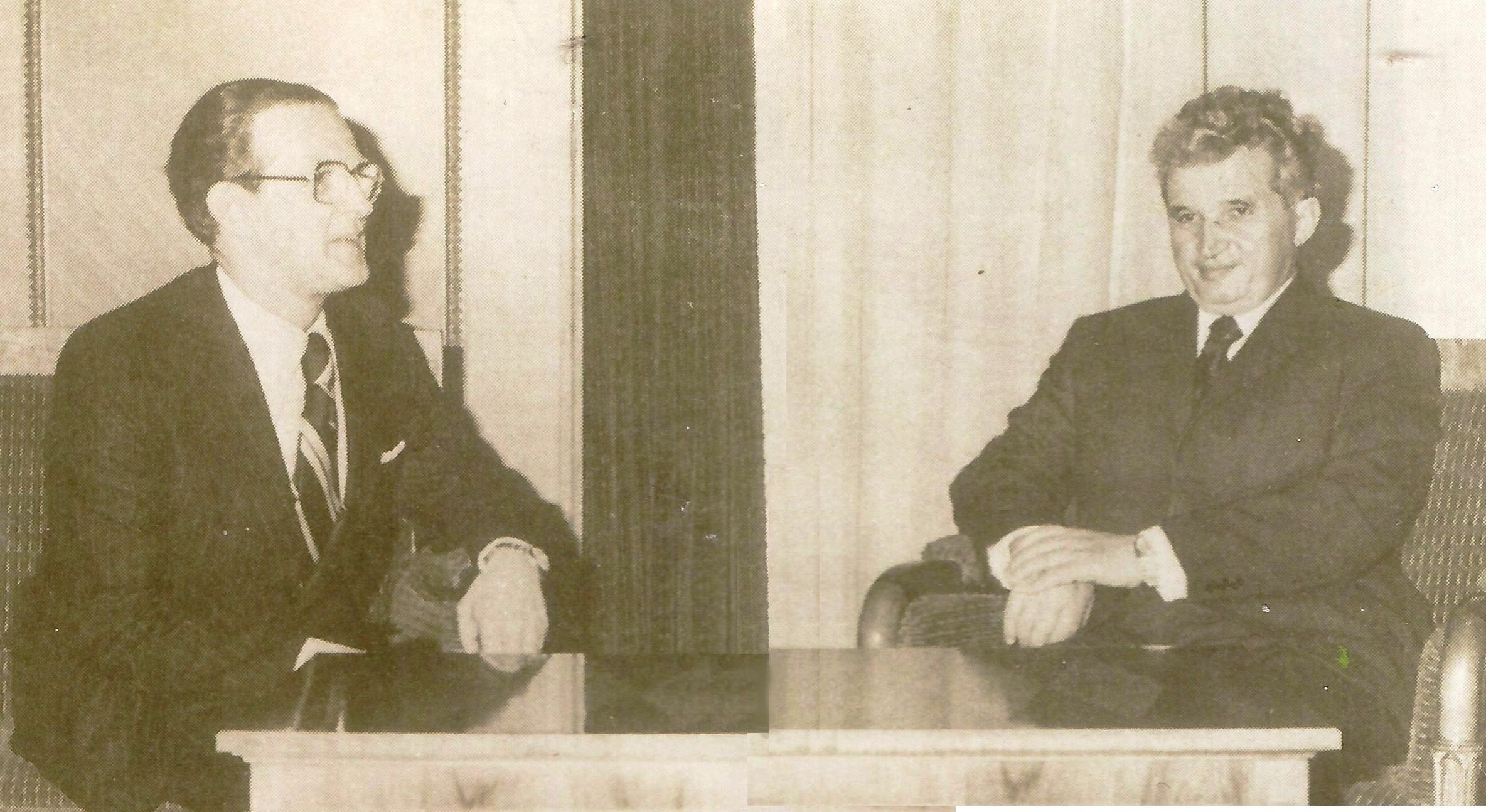
Gefen with Nicolae Ceaușescu, President of Romania.

He also held several positions at the Ministry of Foreign Affairs headquarters, including deputy director of the Cultural Relations Department from April 1960, director of the Cultural Relations Department from 1972 to 1978, and Advisor to Foreign Minister Yitzhak Shamir after 1982.

After retiring, Gefen continued to work for the Ministry of Foreign Affairs as a pensioner, serving as editor-in-chief of the Yearbook of Official Documents from 1993 to 1998. He also served as chairman of the Association of Lithuanian Expatriates in Israel between 1987–1992.

Gefen lived with his wife in Jerusalem. They had three children.

== Political activity ==
Gefen was a member of the Israeli Labor Party, and in January 1974 he founded the David Ben-Gurion ideological group in the party and served as its chairman. Gefen described the group's approach as ‘national non-partisan activism’ and criticized what he characterized as a ‘defeatist, factional, dovish approach’. He called for the establishment of a National Unity Government, and ahead of the 1977 elections, supported Shimon Peres for prime minister.

After his retirement, he founded a political movement, the Pensioners' Party and ran in the 1988 elections and in the 1992 elections. The list failed to cross the electoral threshold in either election.

== Books ==
Over the course of his career, Gefen published books on the Holocaust, the Bricha movement, Israeli diplomacy, and political affairs.

- Gefen, Aba (1961). פורצי המחסומים [The Barrier Breakers] (in Hebrew). Yessod. — A description of the Bricha activities in Austria after World War II.
- Gefen, Aba (1973). Unholy Alliance. Yuval Tal Ltd. - The Jewish People facing the forces of Anti-Semitism.
- Gefen, Aba (1976). ההכרעה בלתי נמנעת [The Decision is Inevitable] (in Hebrew). Biblos.
- Gefen, Aba (1985). אשנב למסך הברזל [A View into the Iron Curtain] (in Hebrew). Borgo Press. — An account of Gefen's tenure as Israel's ambassador to Romania during the Ceaușescu era.
- Gefen, Aba (1989). Hope in Darkness: The Aba Gefen Holocaust Diaries, 1941–1944. New York: Holocaust Library. — Originally published in Hebrew in 1977 and subsequently translated into five languages: English, French, German, Spanish, and Portuguese.
- Gefen, Aba (1990). חי יותר מדי [Lived Too Long] (in Hebrew). Milo.
- Gefen, Aba (1993). Defying the Holocaust: A Diplomat's Report. Borgo Press.
- Gefen, Aba (2001). Israel at a Crossroads. Gefen Publishing House. - The history of the State of Israel over the years
