= Iksal =

Arab locality in northern Israel

Iksal: אִכְּסָל, אכסאל, כִּסְלוֹת תָּבוֹר; إكسال
- Local council

Hebrew transcription(s)
  - ISO 259: ʔikksal, Ksalot Tabor
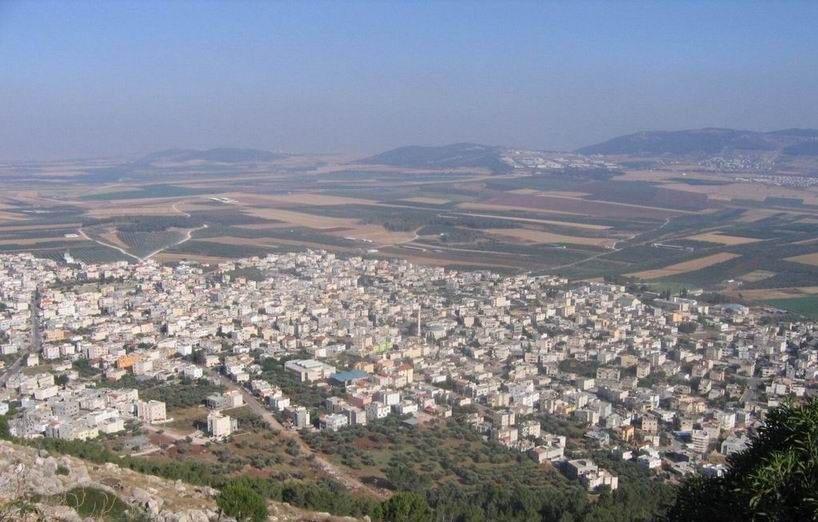
- Iksal, as seen from Nazareth Illit

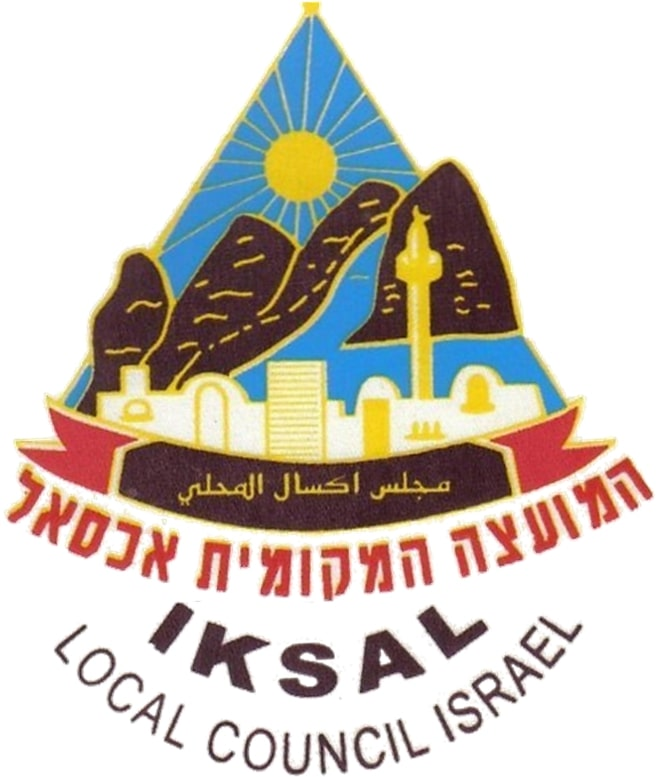
- Flag Seal

- Location within Israel Location within Jezreel Valley region of Israel
- Coordinates: 32°41′N 35°19′E
- Grid position: 180/232 PAL
- Country: Israel
- District: Northern
- Subdistrict: Jezreel
- Natural Region: Nazareth-Tir'an Mountains

Area
  - Total: 9,000 dunams (9.0 km^{2}; 3.5 sq mi)

Population (2024)
  - Total: 15,134
  - Density: 1,700/km^{2} (4,400/sq mi)
- Name meaning: from ancient Chesulloth, probably after a personal name
- Website: موقع إكسال مدرسة إكسال الثانوية مدرسة إكسال الإعداديةالرازي

Iksal (Arabic: إكسال, Hebrew: אִכְּסָאל, כִּסְלוֹת תָּבוֹר, Kislot Tavor) is an Arab local council in northern Israel, about 5 kilometres (3.1 mi) southeast of Nazareth. It has an area of 9,000 dunams and a population of 15,134 primarily Muslim inhabitants.

== Name ==
The name of the town is believed to derive from Kislot, a biblical town mentioned in the Book of Joshua (Joshua 19:12).

== History ==
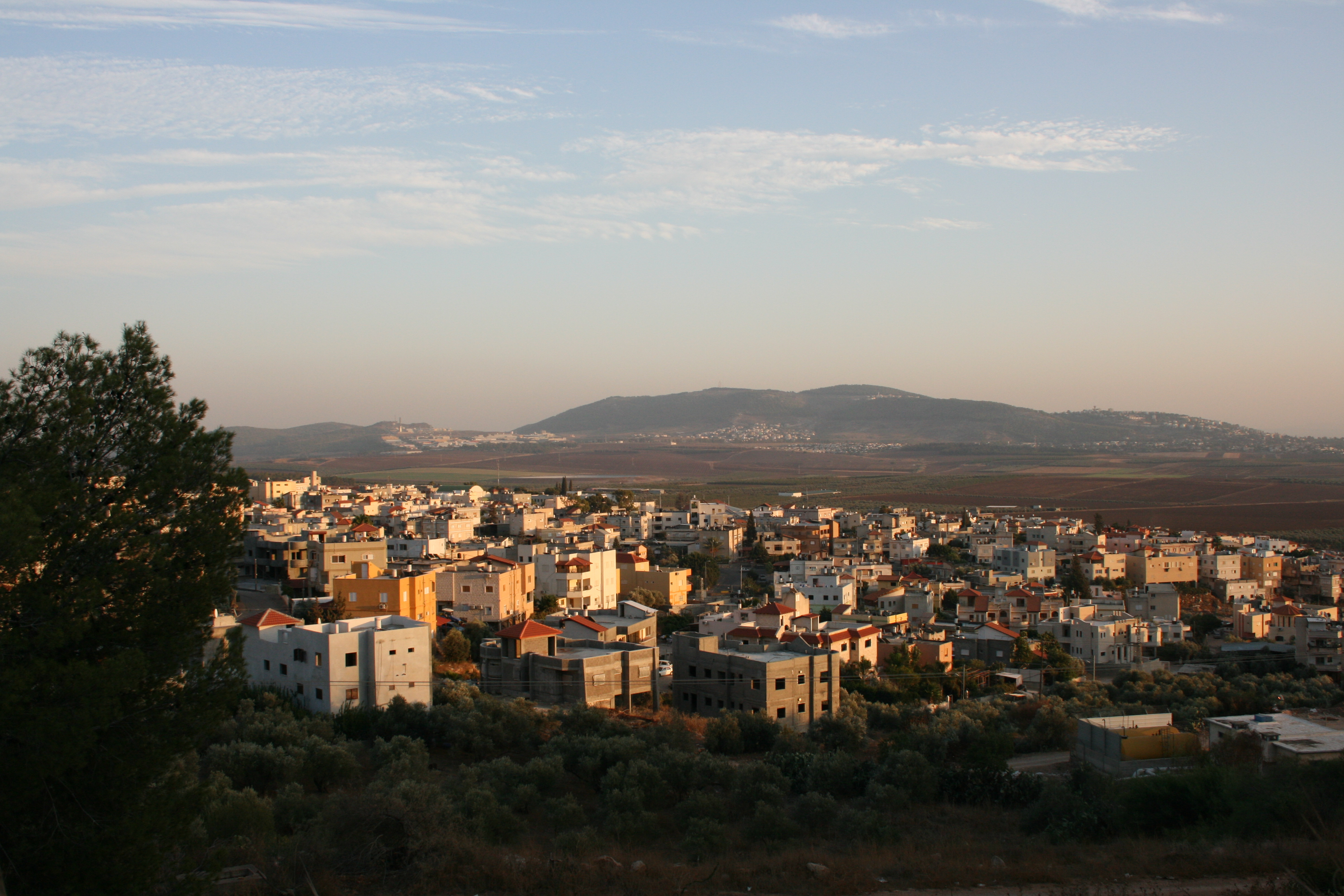
A view of Iksal from the east, looking towards the southwest

In 2008 and 2012, archaeological surveys were conducted at the ancient site by Daniel Zohar and Mouqary `Abdallah on behalf of the Israel Antiquities Authority (IAA).

=== Roman and Byzantine empires ===
Iksal was known to Josephus as Xaloth. Archaeological excavations in Iksal revealed artifacts from the period of Roman and Byzantine rule in Palestine. A ring decorated with the image of a lion dates to this period. Rock-cut tombs, glass vessels and jewelry were also found, as well as agricultural installations from the Byzantine period such as a plastered winepress carved into the rock.

Archaeologist Uzi Leibner says Iksal is one of several villages in Galilee that had a Jewish population during the Roman period, joined later by Christians.

=== Caliphates and Crusaders ===
In 536 a council in Jerusalem convened to condemn Severus of Antioch and his followers. Present at that Council were 45 bishops, including Parthenius, bishop of Exalus, who have been identified with Iksal.

Remains have been excavated dating to the Umayyad period (7th century CE), including pottery and Cream Ware bowls.

On December 22, 946, the forces of the Egyptian Ikhshidid dynasty defeated those of Sayf al-Daula at Iksal. The latter retreated to Aleppo, while the Ikshidid forces advanced onto Damascus.

During the period of Crusader rule in Palestine, a castle was built in Iksal, the ruins of which are visible today. The Crusaders probably built over an older structure dating to the Abbasid, and Fatimid era. A large cemetery on the village ouskirts was known as Mukbarat el Afranj ("Cemetery of the Franks").

Yaqut al-Hamawi described Aksal as a village five leagues from Tiberias near the Abu Futrus river.

Remains from the Mamluk period have also been excavated. Three sites revealed pottery remains from the 14th and 15th century CE.

=== Ottoman Empire ===
In 1517, the village came under the rule of the Ottoman Empire. In 1596 tax-records it appeared as Ksal, located in the Nahiya of Tabariyya of the Safad Sanjak. The population was 17 households and 1 bachelor, all Muslim. They paid a tax rate of 25% on agricultural products, which included wheat, barley, summer crops, fruit trees, occasional revenues, goats and beehives; a total of 6,633 Akçe.

In 1738 Richard Pococke passed by the place, which he called Zal. He noted that near it was "many sepulchres cut in the rock, some of them are like stone coffins above-ground, others are cut into the rock, like graves, some of them have stone covers over them, so that formerly this might be no inconsiderable place." A map from Napoleon's invasion of 1799 by Pierre Jacotin showed the place, named as Iksad.

Edward Robinson, who passed by the village in 1838, repeated Pocockes assertion that Iksal had many sepulchres.

In 1863 Henry Baker Tristram saw the remains of a "Crusader" tower in Iksal, while in 1875, Victor Guérin found it to have 400 inhabitants, all Muslim. In 1881, the PEF's Survey of Western Palestine (SWP) described Iksal as "a large stone village, built in the plains, with a conspicuous square tower, surrounded by gardens and containing about 400 Moslims, many caves and cisterns."

A population list from about 1887 showed that Iksal had about 600 Muslim inhabitants.

=== British Mandate ===
At the time of the 1922 census of Palestine Iksal had a population of 621 Muslims, increasing slightly in the 1931 census to 752, still all Muslims, in a total of 166 houses.

In the 1945 statistics the population was 1,110, all Muslims, while the total land area was 16,009 dunams, according to an official land and population survey. Of this, 581 were allocated for plantations and irrigable land, 13,029 for cereals, while 47 dunams were classified as built-up (urban) areas.

=== Israel ===
Like many other Arab towns and villages in the Galilee that were left standing after the 1948 Arab-Israeli War, Iksal surrendered to Israeli forces without putting up a fight. Individuals who had collaborated with Zionist officials prior to Israel's establishment, negotiated the terms of surrender and transition to rule under the new military government.

== Demographics ==
Historical population
Year	Pop.	±%
1972	3,500	—
1983	5,300	+51.4%
1995	8,100	+52.8%
2008	11,900	+46.9%
2022	14,646	+23.1%
2024	15,134	+3.3%

According to the Israel Central Bureau of Statistics, the town had a low ranking (3 out of 10) on the country's socioeconomic index (December 2001). Only 65.3% of students are entitled to a matriculation certificate after Grade 12 (2000). The average salary that year was NIS 3,640 per month, whereas the national average was NIS 6,835. Its population has grown at an annual rate of 2.8%. In Iksal, about 60 percent of the inhabitants are family relations of one another.

== Voting Patterns ==
In the 2022 election, 97 percent of voters in Iksal voted for the Arab parties, while 2 percent voted for the parties of the center-left coalition led by Yair Lapid and 1 percent voted for the parties of the right-wing coalition led by Benjamin Netanyahu. Among the voters for the Arab parties, 54 percent voted for the Hadash–Ta'al list, while 27 percent voted for Ra'am and 20 percent voted for Balad.

In the 2026 election, 98 percent of voters in Iksal voted for the Arab parties, while 1 percent voted for the parties of the center-left coalition led by Gadi Eisenkot and 0.3 percent voted for the parties of the right-wing coalition led by Benjamin Netanyahu. Among the voters for the Arab parties, 89.5 percent voted for the Joint List, while 10.5 percent voted for Ra'am. Voter turnout increased 77 percent from the 2022 election.

== Notable people ==
- Abdulwahab Darawshe, politician
- Ayid Habshi, footballer
- Sameh Zoabi, film director

== Social and family structure ==
The town of Iksal is home to several prominent families whose histories and contributions have significantly shaped the village's cultural and social landscape, including the families:

- Habashi
- Abd el-Hadi
- Shadafna
- Darawshi
- Shalaby

where the majority are the former two

Darawshe Family

The Darawshe family has resided in Iksal for generations and is part of Israel’s Palestinian Arab minority. The family has produced notable individuals, including Moad Darawshe, a paramedic who was recognized for his humanitarian work in treating Israelis injured in attacks. (KTSM News)

Abd el-Hadi Family

The Abd el-Hadi family has been engaged in almond cultivation in Iksal since 2009. The village’s favorable climate and soil conditions have allowed for the development of a thriving almond farming industry, with approximately 100 families involved in cultivating almonds across 3,000 dunams (750 acres). Their contribution to agriculture has played a vital role in the local economy. (Sindyanna of Galilee)

Shalaby Family

Historical photographs from the Anisa Shalaby Collection highlight members of the Shalaby family, indicating their longstanding presence in Iksal. (Palestinian Oral History Archive)

Cultural and Oral Traditions

Iksal has a rich oral tradition, encompassing proverbs, tales, legends, poems, prayers, songs, and drama performances, which offer deeper insight into the village's past. These narratives have been passed down through generations, preserving the heritage and collective memory of its residents. (IC

== See also ==
- Arab localities in Israel

== Bibliography ==
- Aharoni, Yohanan (1979). The land of the Bible: a historical geography (2nd, illustrated, revised ed.). Westminster John Knox Press. ISBN 0-664-24266-9.
- Alexandre, Yardenna (2008-03-26). "Iksal Final Report". Hadashot Arkheologiyot – Excavations and Surveys in Israel (120).
- Alexandre, Yardenna (2011-08-29). "Iksal Final Report". Hadashot Arkheologiyot – Excavations and Surveys in Israel (123).
- Armstrong, George (2009). Names and Places in the Old Testament and Apocrypha. BiblioBazaar, LLC. ISBN 978-1-103-29324-7.
- Bagatti, B. (2001). Ancient Christian Villages of Galilee. Jerusalem: Franciscan press. ISBN 9789655160123.
- Barron, J.B., ed. (1923). Palestine: Report and General Abstracts of the Census of 1922. Government of Palestine.
- Chancey, Mark A. (2005). Greco-Roman culture and the Galilee of Jesus (Illustrated ed.). Cambridge University Press. ISBN 0-521-84647-1.
- Conder, C.R.; Kitchener, H.H. (1881). The Survey of Western Palestine: Memoirs of the Topography, Orography, Hydrography, and Archaeology. Vol. 1. London: Committee of the Palestine Exploration Fund.
- Cohen, H. (2010). Good Arabs: The Israeli Security Agencies and the Israeli Arabs, 1948-1967. University of California Press. ISBN 978-0-520-25767-2.
- Cushner, Kenneth (2004). Beyond tourism: a practical guide to meaningful educational travel. Rowman & Littlefield. ISBN 1-57886-154-3.
- Dauphin, C. (1998). La Palestine byzantine, Peuplement et Populations. BAR International Series 726 (in French). Vol. III : Catalogue. Oxford: Archeopress. ISBN 0-860549-05-4.
- Department of Statistics (1945). Village Statistics, April, 1945. Government of Palestine.
- Freedman, D.N.; Myers, Allen C.; Beck, Astrid B. (2000). Eerdmans dictionary of the Bible (Illustrated ed.). Wm. B. Eerdmans Publishing. ISBN 0-8028-2400-5.
- Gil, Moshe (1997) [1983]. A History of Palestine, 634–1099. Translated by Ethel Broido. Cambridge: Cambridge University Press. ISBN 0-521-59984-9.
- Guérin, V. (1880). Description Géographique Historique et Archéologique de la Palestine (in French). Vol. 3: Galilee, pt. 1. Paris: L'Imprimerie Nationale.
- Hadawi, S. (1970). Village Statistics of 1945: A Classification of Land and Area ownership in Palestine. Palestine Liberation Organization Research Center.
- Hütteroth, W.-D.; Abdulfattah, K. (1977). Historical Geography of Palestine, Transjordan and Southern Syria in the Late 16th Century. Erlanger Geographische Arbeiten, Sonderband 5. Erlangen, Germany: Vorstand der Fränkischen Geographischen Gesellschaft. ISBN 3-920405-41-2.
- Karmon, Y. (1960). "An Analysis of Jacotin's Map of Palestine" (PDF). Israel Exploration Journal. 10 (3, 4): 155–173, 244–253. Archived from the original (PDF) on 2019-12-22.
- Le Strange, G. (1890). Palestine Under the Moslems: A Description of Syria and the Holy Land from A.D. 650 to 1500. Committee of the Palestine Exploration Fund.
- Mills, E., ed. (1932). Census of Palestine 1931. Population of Villages, Towns and Administrative Areas. Jerusalem: Government of Palestine.
- Mokary, Abdalla (2011-06-23). "Iksal". Hadashot Arkheologiyot – Excavations and Surveys in Israel (123).
- Mokary, Abdalla (2014-12-31). "Iksal". Hadashot Arkheologiyot – Excavations and Surveys in Israel (126).
- Palmer, E.H. (1881). The Survey of Western Palestine: Arabic and English Name Lists Collected During the Survey by Lieutenants Conder and Kitchener, R. E. Transliterated and Explained by E.H. Palmer. Committee of the Palestine Exploration Fund.
- Pococke, R. (1745). A description of the East, and some other countries. Vol. 2. London: Printed for the author, by W. Bowyer.
- Rhode, H. (1979). Administration and Population of the Sancak of Safed in the Sixteenth Century. Columbia University. Archived from the original on 2020-03-01.
- Robinson, E.; Smith, E. (1841). Biblical Researches in Palestine, Mount Sinai and Arabia Petraea: A Journal of Travels in the year 1838. Vol. 3. Boston: Crocker & Brewster.
- Schumacher, G. (1888). "Population list of the Liwa of Akka". Quarterly Statement - Palestine Exploration Fund. 20: 169–191.
- Sharon, M. (2013). Corpus Inscriptionum Arabicarum Palaestinae, H-I. Vol. 5. BRILL. ISBN 978-90-04-25097-0.
- Tristram, H.B. (1865). Land of Israel, A Journal of travel in Palestine, undertaken with special reference to its physical character. London: Society for Promoting Christian Knowledge.
- Zidan, Omar (2019-12-09). "Iksal Final Report". Hadashot Arkheologiyot – Excavations and Surveys in Israel (131).
