= Jacques Amir =

Israeli politician (1933–2011)

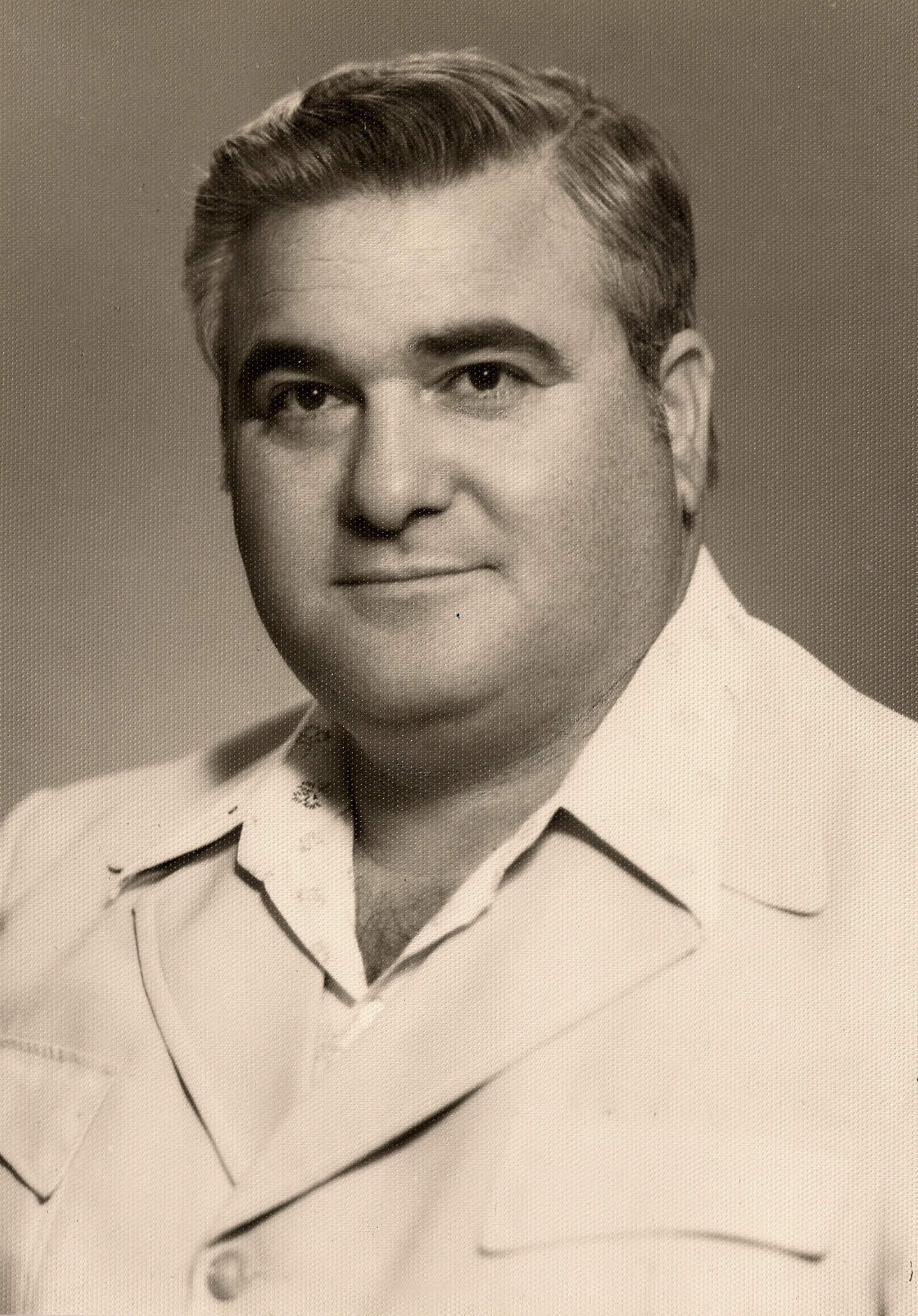
- Amir in 1977

Faction represented in the Knesset
- 1974–1988: Alignment

Personal details
- Born: 15 March 1933 Mogador, Morocco
- Died: 31 March 2011 (aged 78)

Ya'akov Jacques Amir (Hebrew: יעקב ז'אק אמיר; 15 March 1933 – 31 March 2011) was an Israeli politician who served as a member of the Knesset for the Alignment between 1974 and 1988.

== Biography ==
Born Jacques Amzalag in Mogador (now Essaouira) in Morocco, the son of Yitzhak-Chaim Amzalag, Amir was educated in a vocational high school in Casablanca and was a member of the Pioneer youth movement. In 1952 he emigrated to Israel, where he joined kibbutz Ein Gev and the Ahdut HaAvoda party. His first name, Jacques, was accidentally hebraized as Yaakov due to the error of an official at Haifa port. The following year he moved to Kibbutz Ginosar, where he lived until moving to Dimona in 1958. From 1959 until 1974 he worked at the Dead Sea Works, becoming senior foreman of the metal section and first secretary and chairman of the workers council. He also served on Dimona Workers Council between 1959 and 1964 and as a member of the Histadrut executive committee from 1965 until 1973.

In 1965 he became deputy mayor of Dimona, serving until 1968 and again from 1973 until 1976. He was placed fifty-third on the Alignment list (an alliance of the Labor Party (which Ahdut HaAvoda had merged into in 1968) and Mapam) for the 1973 Knesset elections, and although the alliance won only 51 seats, he entered the Knesset on 10 June 1974 as a replacement for former Prime Minister Golda Meir. He was moved up to twenty-seventh on the Alignment list for the 1977 elections, and was re-elected as the alliance won 32 seats. The following year he became mayor of Dimona, a post he held until 1984. Remaining twenty-seventh on the Alignment list, he was re-elected to the Knesset again in 1981 and 1984, before losing his seat in the 1988 elections when he was placed 109th on the alliance's list.

Outside politics, Amir was also a member of the world presidium of the Sephardi Federation and in 1986 was appointed chairman of the Israeli Alcoholism Prevention Society.
