= Nahman Raz =

Israeli politician (1924–2015)

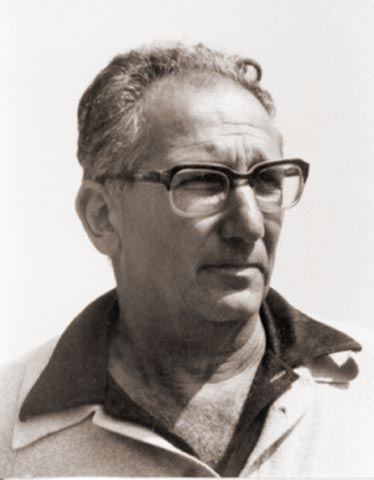

Faction represented in the Knesset
- 1983–1988: Alignment

Personal details
- Born: 9 December 1924 Ein Harod, Mandatory Palestine
- Died: 5 July 2015 (aged 90)

Nahman Raz (Hebrew: נחמן רז; 9 December 1924 – 5 July 2015) was an Israeli politician who served as a member of the Knesset for the Alignment between 1983 and 1988.

== Biography ==
Born Nahman Rizhyk in Ein Harod during the Mandate era, Raz was educated at a high school in kibbutz Geva, before attending the Teachers Seminary at Beit Berl and studying history and literature at the Hebrew University of Jerusalem. From 1947 until 1948 he was secretary of the Noar HaOved youth movement.

During his national service in the IDF from 1950 until 1952 he served as a Social Officer and a Chief Educational Officer in the Nahal brigade. From 1954 until 1956 he worked as an instructor in immigrant settlements. He began working as a teacher at a school in Ein Harod in 1958, remaining at the school until 1978, and also serving as its headteacher.

In 1972 he became secretary of Geva, and between 1973 and 1976, also served as secretary of Ihud HaKvutzot VeHaKibbutzim. After it merged into the United Kibbutz Movement in 1981, he became a member of its secretariat. He was also a member of the central committee of the Labor Party, and was on the Alignment list (an alliance of the Labor Party and Mapam) for the 1981 elections. Although he failed to win a seat, he entered the Knesset on 22 March 1983 as a replacement for Chaim Herzog, who had been elected President.

He was re-elected in 1984 and chaired the Education and Culture Committee. However, he lost his seat in the 1988 elections.
