= Haim Kaufman =

Israeli politician (1934–1995)

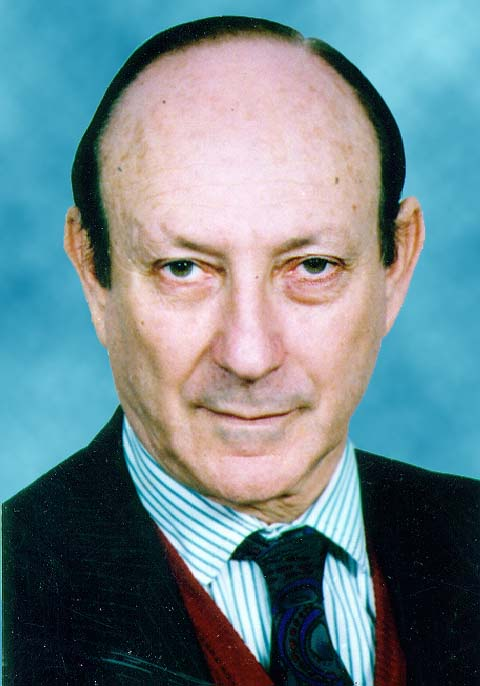

Faction represented in the Knesset
- 1974–1988: Likud
- 1990–1995: Likud

Personal details
- Born: 12 December 1934 Tel Aviv, Mandatory Palestine
- Died: 7 August 1995 (aged 60)

Haim Kaufman (Hebrew: חיים קופמן; 12 December 1934 – 7 August 1995) was an Israeli politician who served as a member of the Knesset for Likud between 1977 and 1988, and again from 1990 until his death in 1995.

== Biography ==
Born in Tel Aviv during the Mandate era, Leket served in the Artillery Corps during his national service in the IDF. He studied law at the School of Law and Economics in Tel Aviv, and later worked as a corporate director.

A member of Herut, Kaufman chaired the party's youth group and the Dor Hemsheh group within it. He was on the Likud list (an alliance of Herut and several other right-wing parties) for the 1973 elections, but failed to win a seat. However, he entered the Knesset on 19 January 1977 as a replacement for Binyamin Halevi, He was re-elected in the May 1977 elections, and again in 1981 and 1984, serving as Deputy Minister of Finance between 1981 and 1984. He became a member of the Likud secretariat and chairman of its municipal branch, as well as chairing the party's Petah Tikva branch and editing the party magazine BeEretz Yisrael.

Although he lost his seat in the 1988 elections, Kaufman returned to the Knesset on 8 October 1990 as a replacement for Zalman Shoval. He retained his seat in the 1992 elections, but died in office on 7 August 1995. He was buried in Segula Cemetery. His seat was taken by Yosef Ahimeir.
