= Miriam Glazer-Ta'asa =

Israeli politician (born 1929)

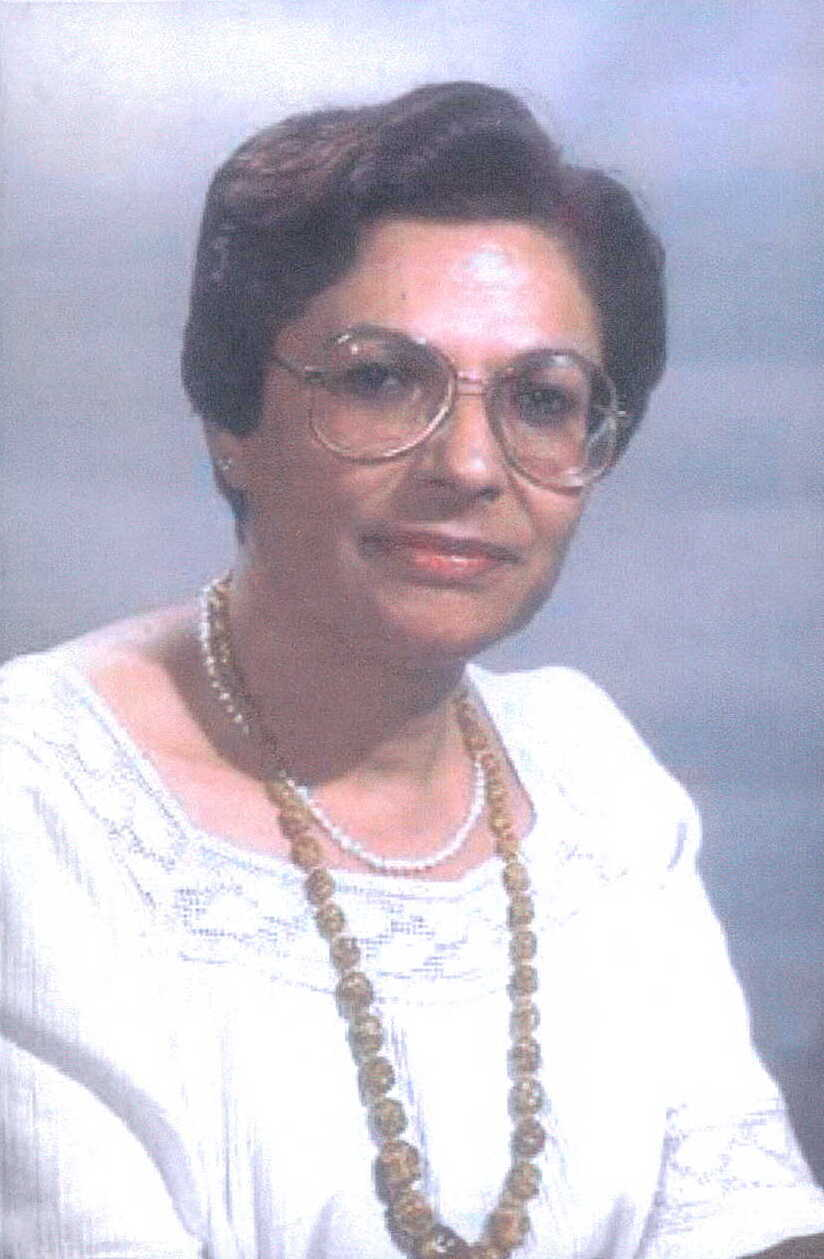
- Glazer-Ta'asa in the 1980s

Faction represented in the Knesset
- 1981–1984: Likud

Personal details
- Born: 11 August 1929 (age 96) Yemen

Miriam Glazer-Ta'asa (Hebrew: מרים גלזר-תעסה; born 11 August 1929) is an Israeli former politician who served as a member of the Knesset for Likud between 1981 and 1988, and as Deputy Minister of Education and Culture from 1981 until 1984.

== Biography ==
Miriam Ta'asa was born in Yemen in 1929 to a Mizrahi Jewish family. In 1934, the family emigrated to Mandatory Palestine and she grew up in the Neve Tzedek neighbourhood of Tel Aviv, where she attended the Talpiot Gymnasium. She joined the Irgun in 1945, later becoming an officer, and served in the IDF after Israeli independence.

She went on to study at the Hebrew University of Jerusalem, where she earned a bachelor's degree, and the Jewish Theological Seminary of America, where she earned a master's. Between 1951 and 1980, she worked as the headteacher at the Johanna Jabotinsky high school in Be'er Ya'akov. From 1978 until 1980, she also lectured at the Levinsky Teachers' Seminary.

In 1981, she was elected to the Knesset on the Likud list, and on 11 August that year was appointed Deputy Minister of Education and Culture. She was re-elected in 1984, but was not re-appointed to her deputy ministerial post, though she did become chairwoman of the Immigration and Absorption Committee. She lost her seat in the 1988 elections.

== Personal life ==
She was married to Chaim Glazer in 1955 and remained so until his death in 2009. They had three sons.
