= David Danino =

Israeli politician

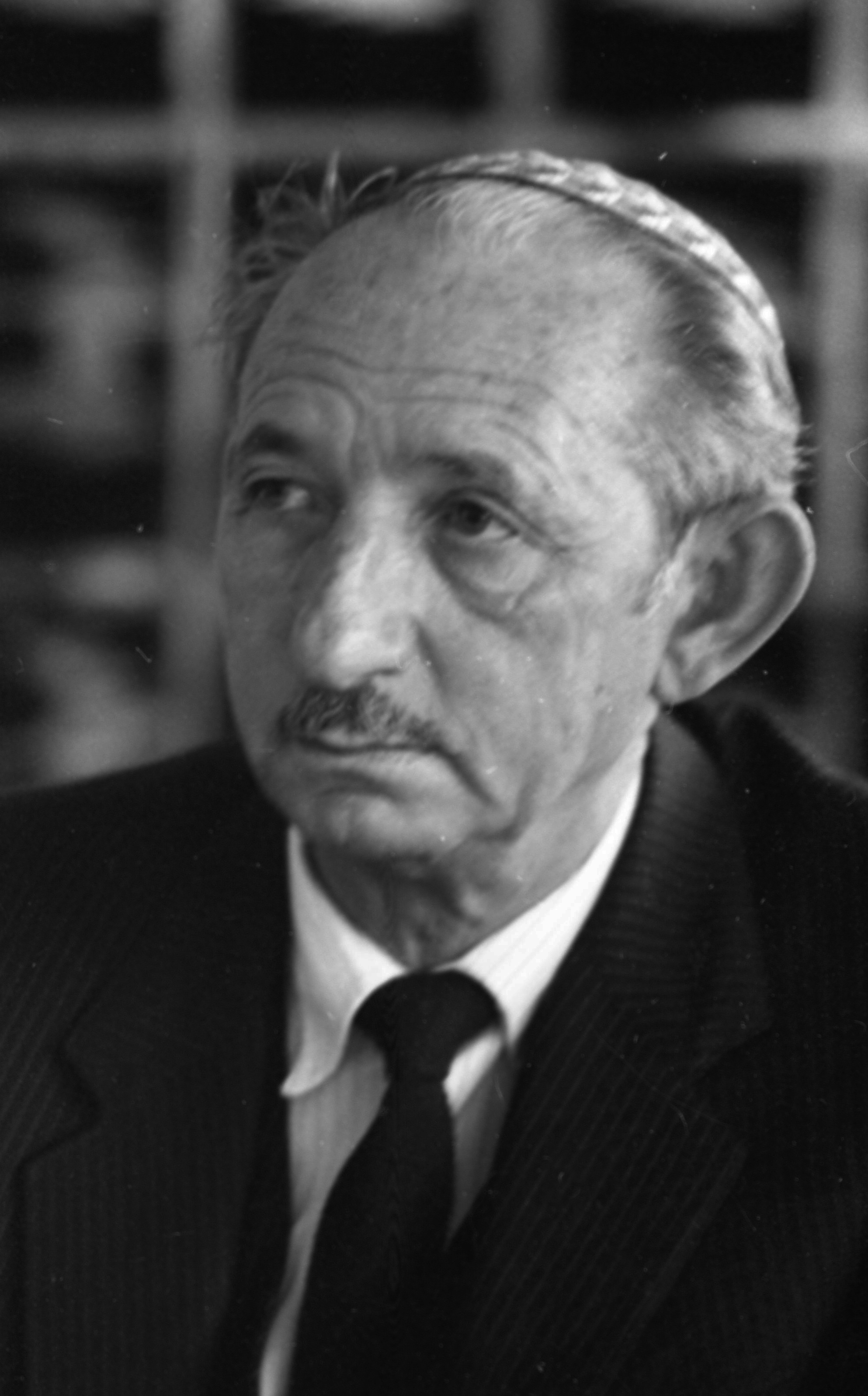
- Danino in 1985

Faction represented in the Knesset
- 1984–1988: National Religious Party

Personal details
- Born: 1924 Marrakesh, Morocco
- Died: 7 June 1990 (aged 65–66)

David Danino (Hebrew: דוד דנינו, 1924 – 7 June 1990) was a Moroccan-born Israeli politician who served as a member of the Knesset for the National Religious Party from 1984 until 1988.

== Biography ==
Born in Marrakesh in Morocco in 1924, Danino was educated in yeshivas in his home city and Casablanca, where he was an instructor for Religious Zionist youth. He made aliyah to Israel in 1956 and studied at a Teachers Seminary at Bar-Ilan University. He was also certified as a rabbi.

In 1956 he was amongst the founders of the Galil State School and taught there until 1959. A member of Hapoel HaMizrachi, he became head of Shlomi local council in 1960, holding the post until 1969. In 1974 he became head of the Religious Council, and in 1978 head of Hapoel HaMizrachi's Organisation Department.

In 1984 he was elected to the Knesset on the National Religious Party list. He lost his seat in the 1988 elections and died in 1990.
