= Shlomo Amar (politician) =

Israeli former politician

Faction represented in the Knesset
- 1984: Yahad
- 1984–1988: Alignment

Personal details
- Born: 24 November 1935 (age 90) Haifa, Mandatory Palestine

Shlomo Amar (Hebrew: שלמה עמר; born 24 November 1935) is an Israeli former politician who served as a member of the Knesset for Yahad and the Alignment between 1984 and 1988.

== Biography ==
Amar was born in Haifa during the Mandate era. He started working at the Egged bus company in 1950, eventually becoming a member of its secretariat.

He was elected to the Knesset on the Yahad list in the 1984 elections, with the party joining the Alignment shortly afterwards. He lost his seat in the 1988 elections.
