= Avner Shaki =

Israeli politician (1926–2005)

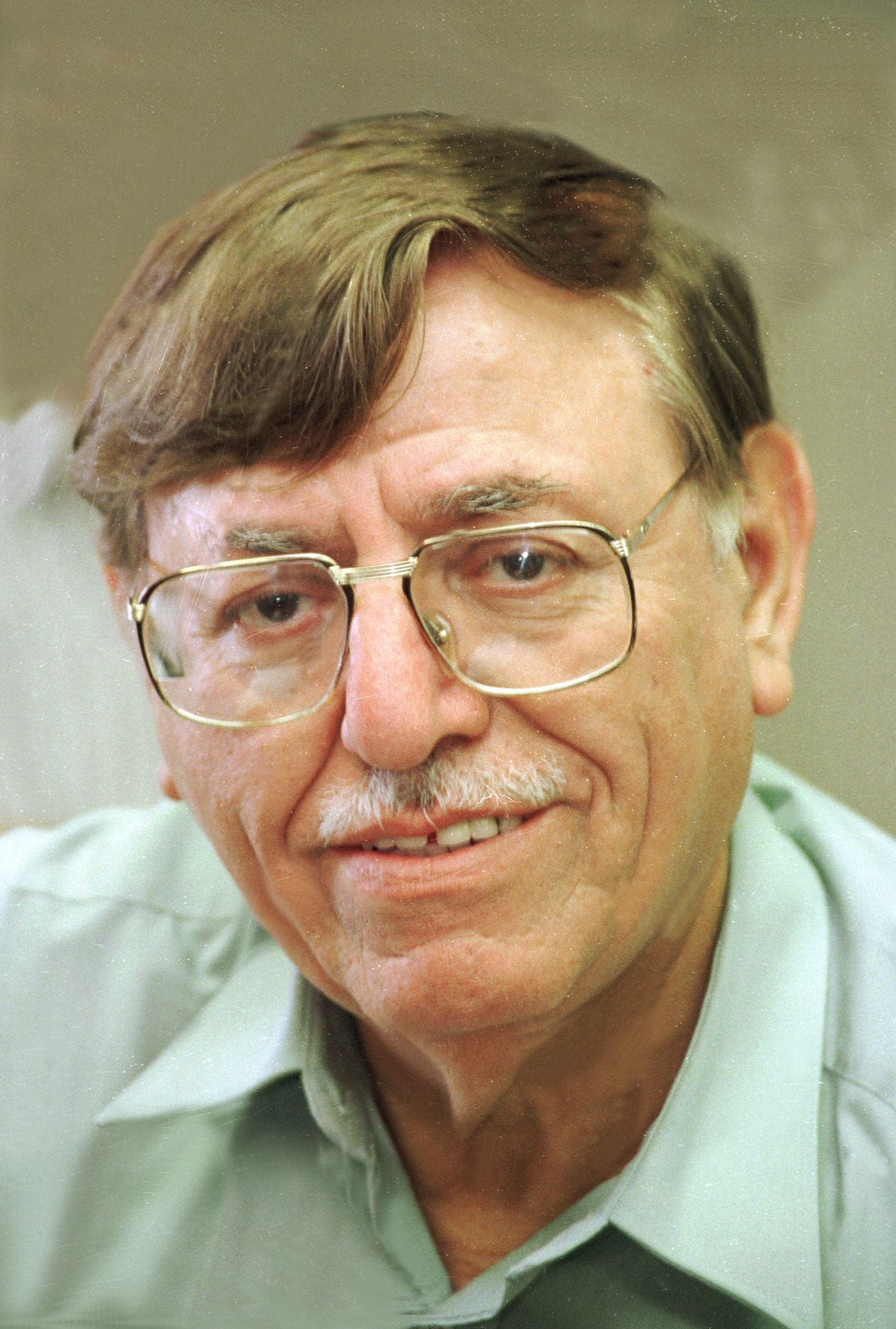
- Shaki in 1996

Ministerial roles
- 1988–1990: Minister without Portfolio
- 1990–1992: Minister of Religious Affairs

Faction represented in the Knesset
- 1970–1973: National Religious Party
- 1973–1974: Independent
- 1984–1999: National Religious Party

Personal details
- Born: 5 February 1926 Safed, Mandatory Palestine
- Died: 28 May 2005 (aged 79)

Avner-Hai Shaki (Hebrew: אבנר-חי שאקי; 5 February 1926 – 28 May 2005) was an Israeli politician who served as a government minister in the late 1980s and early 1990s.

== Biography ==
=== Early life ===
Shaki was born in Safed, the son of Hana (Nazli) and Rabbi Ovadia Shaki. He excelled as a student at the Alliance school. After completing his external matriculation certificate, he studied teaching at the Religious Teachers' Seminary in Jerusalem. Upon finishing his studies, he worked as a salaried teacher at an institution for juvenile offenders in Acre. After examining the conditions at the institution, he approached the Ministry of Welfare demanding the institution's closure, which was subsequently carried out. In his youth he also wrote poems, some of which were published in poetry collections. Shaki began studying law at the Hebrew University of Jerusalem, and due to his excellence he was awarded a full scholarship throughout his studies. In April 1955 he received his master's degree in law, and in November 1955 he qualified as a lawyer. Upon completing his studies, he was invited to serve as a teaching assistant in Jewish law at the Faculty of Law at the university and published research on democratic regimes. He later received a doctorate in law from the Hebrew University of Jerusalem and became a professor of law (private international law, family law and inheritance, religion and state in Law) at Tel Aviv University.

=== In politics ===
Shaki's political career began when he attempted to lead an independent list for the student union but was not elected. He later founded the "Movement for the Advancement of Sephardic Communities." In January 1959 he was appointed by the Minister of Religious Affairs Yaakov Moshe Toledano to a committee investigating claims of discrimination against Sephardim in the composition of the religious council in Jerusalem. Ahead of the 1959 Knesset elections he founded the "National Sephardic Party," which claimed discrimination against Sephardim but failed to pass the electoral threshold. Shaki later joined the National Religious Party (NRP). In the 1969 Knesset elections he was placed 15th on the NRP list and entered the seventh Knesset in 1970 following the death of Haim-Moshe Shapira. A month and a half later, when Micha Reiser was appointed Minister of Welfare, Shaki replaced him as Deputy Minister of Education and Culture in the fifteenth government.

In July 1972, after voting in favor of an amendment to the Law of Return regarding the definition of Who is a Jew according to Halakha, against the stance of the government and his party, he was dismissed from his position as Deputy Minister of Education. In April 1973 he resigned in protest from the NRP and became an independent Member of Knesset. Prior to the 1973 Knesset elections he founded the "Movement for Social Equality," but it did not pass the electoral threshold.

In 1984 he rejoined the NRP and was elected to the 11th Knesset, serving continuously until the 1999 elections. After the 1999 elections, where he served as the chairman of the movement, he was appointed a minister without portfolio in Yitzhak Shamir's government. Following the dirty trick in mid-1990 and the formation of a new government, Shaki was appointed Minister of Religious Affairs, a position he held until 1992. He appointed Shlomo Bekish as Director-General of the ministry. After competing against Rabbi Yitzhak Levi for the leadership of the NRP and the education portfolio in 1998, a contest he lost, Shaki announced he would not run for Knesset again and was appointed an associate president of the World Mizrachi Movement. During his tenure in the Knesset he initiated the Passover Holiday Law together with Avraham Yosef Shapira.

In the 1999 Knesset elections he was placed in the symbolic 120th spot on the NRP list for Knesset.

Shaki served as the chairman of the NRP office and chairman of the lobby to promote understanding between religious and secular people. He was also an honorary president of the Institute for the Study of the Family in Israel.

He died after a severe illness on 28 May 2005.

== Personal life ==
His sister Esther Shaki-Arazi was a poet.

His daughter Smadar Gross served for nine months as the head of the Religious Council in Kfar Saba and was the first woman to hold this position.

In 2021 he was commemorated with a street named after him in the Gilo neighborhood of Jerusalem.
