= Amira Sartani =

Israeli politician (born 1931)

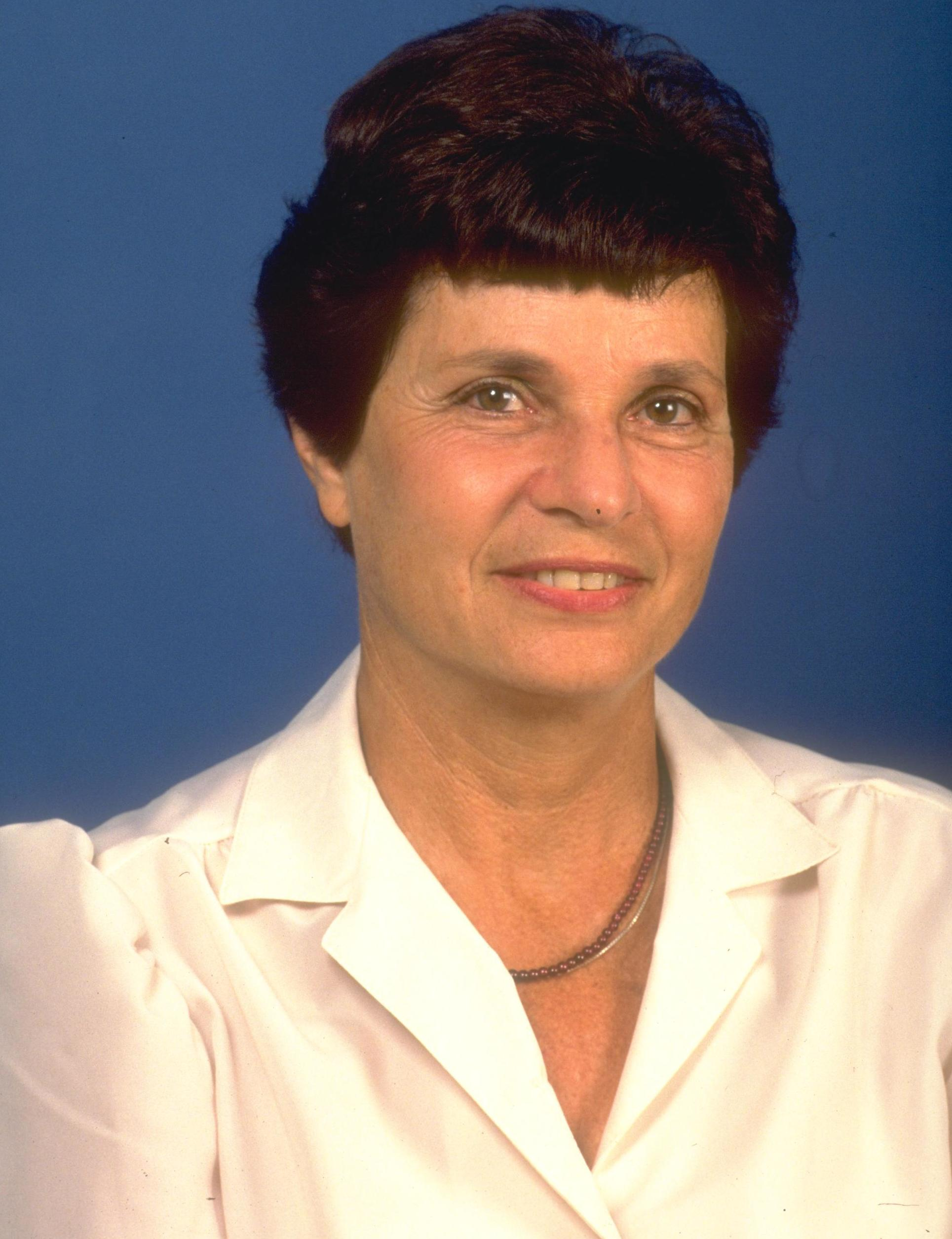
- Sartani in 1984

Faction represented in the Knesset
- 1984: Alignment
- 1984–1988: Mapam

Personal details
- Born: 17 November 1931 (age 94) Merhavia, Mandatory Palestine

Amira Sartani (Hebrew: אמירה סרטני; born 17 November 1931) is an Israeli former politician who served as a member of the Knesset for the Alignment and Mapam between 1984 and 1988.

== Biography ==
Born in kibbutz Merhavia during the Mandate era, Sartani studied at the educational institute Mishmar HaEmek, before attending the Oranim teachers seminary. She later studied sociology and political science at Tel Aviv University.

A member of the Executive Committee of Kibbutz Artzi, Sartani was also a member of Mapam, and joined the party's central committee in 1974. She headed the party's Women's Department and the Mapam delegation to the Na'amat women's organisation from 1976 until 1984, and from 1978 until 1982 she was also a member of the Histadrut's Executive Committee.

In 1984 she was elected to the Knesset on the Alignment list (an alliance of Mapam and the Labor Party, although Mapam broke away from the Alignment shortly after the election). Until losing her seat in the 1988 elections, she was a member of the Education and Culture Committee.

In the 1996 Knesset elections she was placed 90th on the Meretz ticket, in the 2009 elections in 108th place, in the 2013 elections in 111th place, in the 2015 elections in 105th place, and in the 2022 elections in 108th place.
