= Modi'in Ezrachi =

Israel security services company

Modi'in Ezrachi is a company that provides security services, secure patrol services, and call center and monitoring services throughout Israel using armored vehicles. Modi'in Ezrachi Group was founded in 1963 and includes one of the largest security and protection companies in Israel along with a private investigation company.

The company employs security guards, watchmen, armored vehicle patrols (including secure patrols in a mobile unit), patrols, call center operators, and administrative staff. Since February 2009, the company has been operating the Efrayim Gate checkpoint south of Tul Karem.

As of 2022, the company has provided security for former Prime Minister Naftali Bennett's residence in Ra'anana and his children as part of the Prime Minister's Office Security Unit. The company also provides security for ministers, Knesset members, and public figures.

In 2008, the Tel Aviv District Court ruled that the company had signed a false declaration when it stated that it complies with labor laws and that no negative inspection reports had been written against it by a government office. This led to the rejection of its bid in a tender by Israel Railways.

In 2016, an incident occurred at the Qalandiya checkpoint where security guards from "Modi'in Ezrachi" fatally shot a 23-year-old Palestinian woman, the mother of two young girls, and later her 16-year-old brother. The company conducted an internal investigation that concluded that the two security guards acted according to procedure, and the company decided to continue their employment as usual. However, Palestinian sources claimed that the two individuals did not pose a threat to the security personnel and that the shooting was unjustified.
