= Moshe Ze'ev Feldman =

Israeli politician (1930–1997)

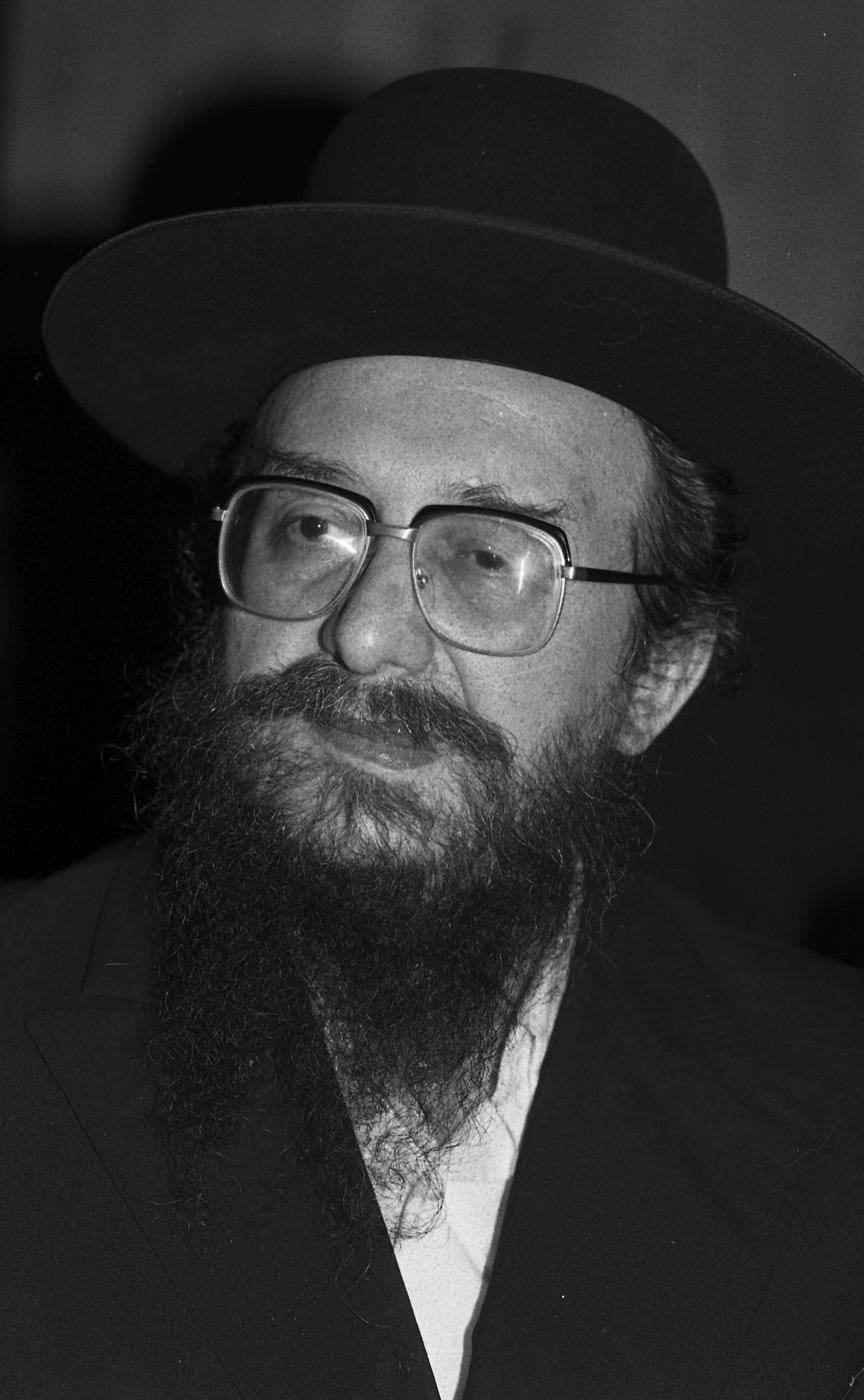
- Feldman in 1983

Faction represented in the Knesset
- 1988–1992: Agudat Yisrael

Personal details
- Born: 14 November 1930 Eisenstadt, Austria
- Died: 9 February 1997 (aged 66)

Moshe Ze'ev Feldman (Hebrew: משה זאב פלדמן; 14 November 1930 – 9 February 1997) was an Israeli rabbi and politician who served as a member of the Knesset for Agudat Yisrael between 1988 and 1992. He also served as Deputy Minister of Labor and Social Welfare from 1988 until 1989.

== Biography ==
Born in Eisenstadt, Austria in 1930, Feldman's family moved to England in 1936. He was educated at a high school for gifted children, before attending the HaRav Weingorten's yeshiva in Staines and the Shfat Emet yeshiva. He emigrated to Israel in 1949 and studied at Yeshivat Shefat Emet. After being certified as a rabbi he became headmaster of the Omar Emet yeshiva in Bnei Brak, and also headed the Beit Yisrael yeshiva in Ashdod, the Aguda yeshiva in Kfar Saba and the Karlin yeshiva in Bnei Brak.

He joined the Agudat Yisrael movement, becoming a member of its central committee, World Executive Committee and eventually chairman of the party in Israel. He was elected to the Knesset on its list in 1988, and was appointed Deputy Minister of Labor and Social Welfare in Yitzhak Shamir's government, although he resigned on 31 October 1989. He lost his seat in the 1992 elections.

He died in 1997 at the age of 66.
