= Moshe Dwek =

Israeli domestic terrorist

Moshe Dwek (Hebrew: משה דואק; 1931–2003) was an Israeli political activist who threw a hand grenade in the Knesset in 1957, wounding the prime minister and several ministers. After 15 years in prison, he established a party and ran for the 12th Knesset but did not pass the electoral threshold.

== Biography ==
Moshe Dwek was born in Aleppo, Mandatory Syria, to a Jewish family. At the age of 13, he was part of a group of Jewish boys that immigrated to Mandate Palestine He initially lived on kibbutz Dorot, then on kibbutz Glil Yam. He fought in the 1948 Arab-Israeli War. In 1950, his parents and brothers immigrated to Israel, settling in Pardesiya.

== Grenade attack ==
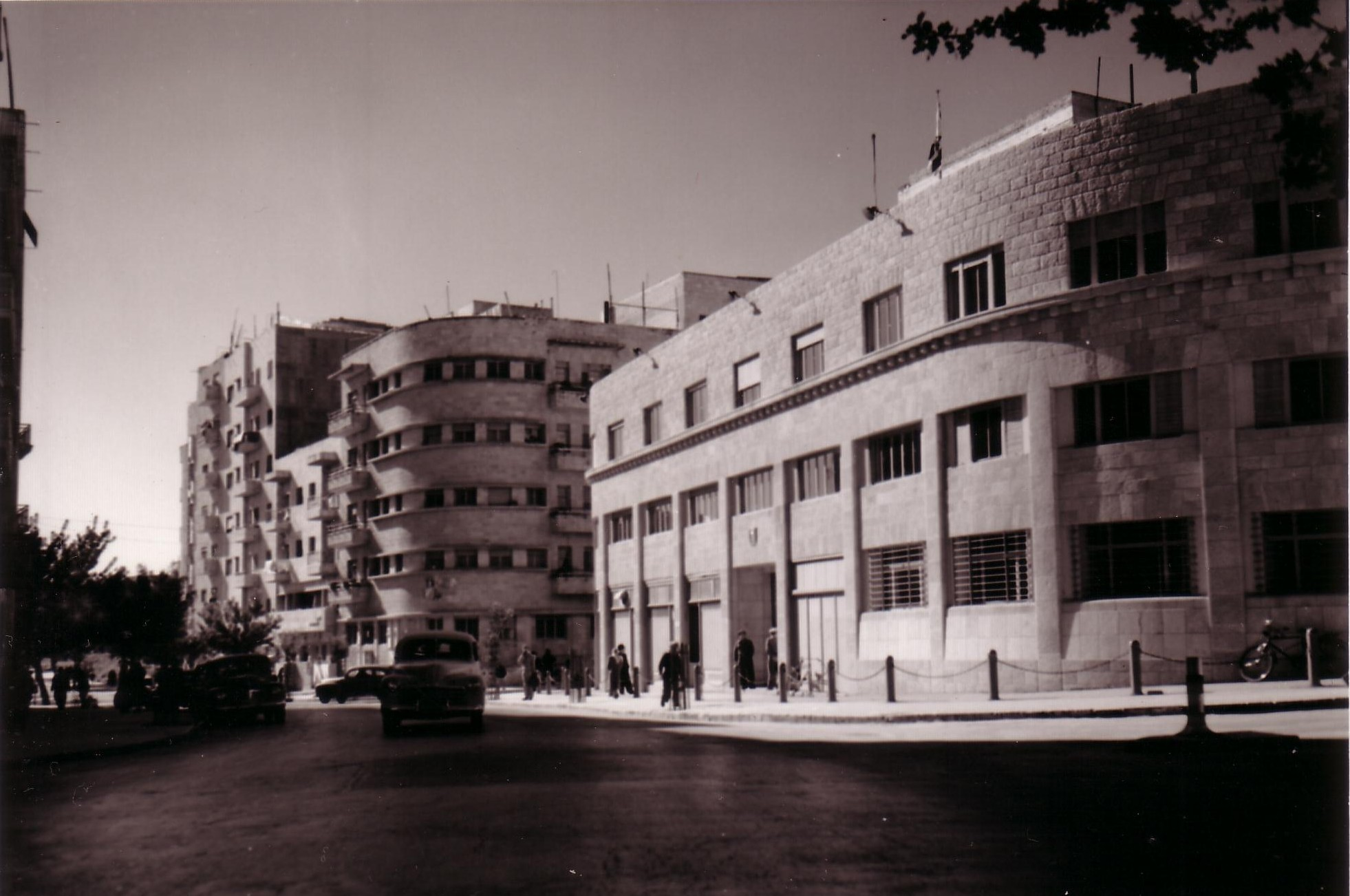
Site of Knesset at the time

On October 29, 1957, while the Knesset (then located in Frumin House in downtown Jerusalem) was in session, Dwek, who was standing on a balcony, threw a grenade he had stolen from the army into the chamber. The grenade exploded and seriously injured Rabbi Haim-Moshe Shapira of the National Religious Party. Prime Minister David Ben-Gurion, Foreign Minister Golda Meir, and Transport Minister Moshe Carmel were injured by shrapnel. The grenade that Moshe Dwek threw had been intended for Ben-Gurion and Meir. Dwek later asked Shapira for forgiveness.

Dwek's assassination attempt resulted in the establishment of the Knesset Guard and Shin Bet's VIP protection unit. The incident was allegedly prompted by Dwek's inability to receive national insurance for his declining health, and was apparently not prompted by larger political issues. Although he was portrayed as psychologically unbalanced, a panel of experts agreed that he was fit to stand trial and he was sentenced to 15 years in prison, part of which he spent in a psychiatric hospital. Requests for a retrial were rejected. After 10 years, Dwek requested a pardon, but this was denied. A slightly different account, published in 1959, gives his name as Moshe Ben Yaakov Dueg, aged 25 years old. This version says he suffered an accident in childhood that left him mentally unbalanced. He had another accident in a youth camp after coming to Palestine just before the founding of the state of Israel. He then tried to sue the Jewish Agency for $66,000.

After losing the case, Dwek sent threatening letters to the judge and was subsequently arrested. He was later deemed unfit for stand trial. In another incident, he attempted to stowaway on a flight to New York City. He had no political party affiliations.

Following the grenade attack, Ben-Gurion wrote a personal letter to Dwek's parents, who were living in a hut without electricity in a village near Tel Aviv. As they spoke only Arabic, the letter had to be translated for them by the courier.

== Political career ==
Dwek later started his own political party, which he named Tarshish, and ran for the Knesset in 1988. The party platform called for an end to Ashkenazi hegemony, and integrating the Sephardic and Mizrahi Jews into the leadership by giving them half of all government ministries, as well as widespread representation in the Knesset, municipalities, and the Jewish Agency. Its other demands included setting up a university, college, and a religious polytechnic institute in the coastal city of Netanya. He is remembered for his unusual TV advertisements, which would start off with Dwek chanting the words No'ar, No'ar, No'ar (literally "youth, youth, youth"). Gaining only 1,654 votes for Tarshish, Dwek failed in his attempt to win a seat in the 12th Knesset.

== See also ==
- 1988 Israeli legislative election
