= Aharon Harel =

Israeli politician (1932–2000)

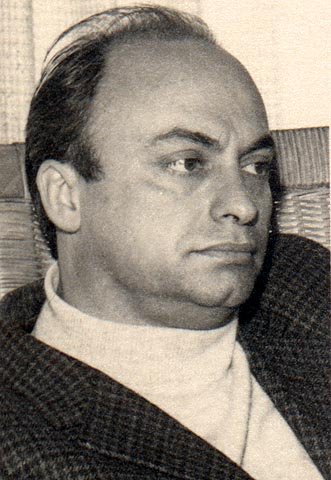
- Harel in the 1980s

Faction represented in the Knesset
- 1981–1988: Alignment

Personal details
- Born: 13 April 1932 Pinsk, Poland
- Died: 13 December 2000 (aged 68)

Aharon Harel (Hebrew: אהרן הראל; 13 April 1932 – 13 December 2000) was an Israeli politician who served as a member of the Knesset for the Alignment between 1981 and 1988.

== Biography ==
Born in Pinsk in Poland (today in Belarus), Harel made aliyah to Mandatory Palestine in 1935. He joined the HaNoar HaOved, and between 1942 and 1950 was an instructor and co-ordinator of the Borochov Neighbourhood branch, before becoming a member of its secretariat in 1951. He went on to study economics and statistics at the Hebrew University of Jerusalem, where he gained a BA, and then management, labour relations and human resource management at the Technion.

He joined Mapai, and headed its Labor Movement department from 1960 until 1964. In 1965 he joined the Mapai breakaway group that left to form Rafi, becoming a member of the central committee and secretariat of the new party.

From 1970 until 1981 he chaired the Organisation and Workers Council department of the Histadrut. He also worked as a lecturer at Ben-Gurion University of the Negev from 1975 until 1976 and at the Technion from 1976 until 1981.

In 1981 he was elected to the Knesset on the Alignment list (an alliance of the Labor Party (which Rafi had merged into in 1968) and Mapam). He was re-elected in 1984 and also became a director of Beit Berl college in the same year.

On 10 May 1988 he resigned from the Knesset, and was replaced by Avraham Shochat. That year he became chairman of the Israel Broadcasting Authority. He left Beit Berl in 1990, and the IBA in 1992.

With his wife, Nira, a writer, Harel had four children, including Asaf, a comedian and writer. He died in 2000 at the age of 68.
