= David Mor =

Israeli politician and jeweler (born 1946)

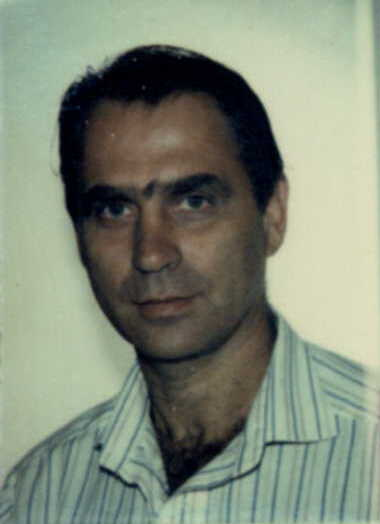
- Mor in 1988

Faction represented in the Knesset
- 1988: Likud

Personal details
- Born: 20 September 1946 (age 79)

David Mor (Hebrew: דוד מור; born 20 September 1946) is an Israeli businessman and former politician who briefly served as a member of the Knesset for Likud in 1988.

== Biography ==
During the 1980s he was chairman of the board of directors of the government development company, Shikun VePituah. He won on the Likud list for the 1984 elections, but failed to win a seat. However, he entered the Knesset on 27 October 1988, replacing Michael Reisser, who had been killed in a car crash. However, he lost his seat in the November elections. He served as a member of the boards of directors of the public housing company Amidar and the Airports Authority, where was also chair of the development committee.

Today he lives in Savyon and is married with three children. He is the father-in-law of Amos Mansdorf.
