= Ra'anan Naim =

Israeli politician (1935–2009)

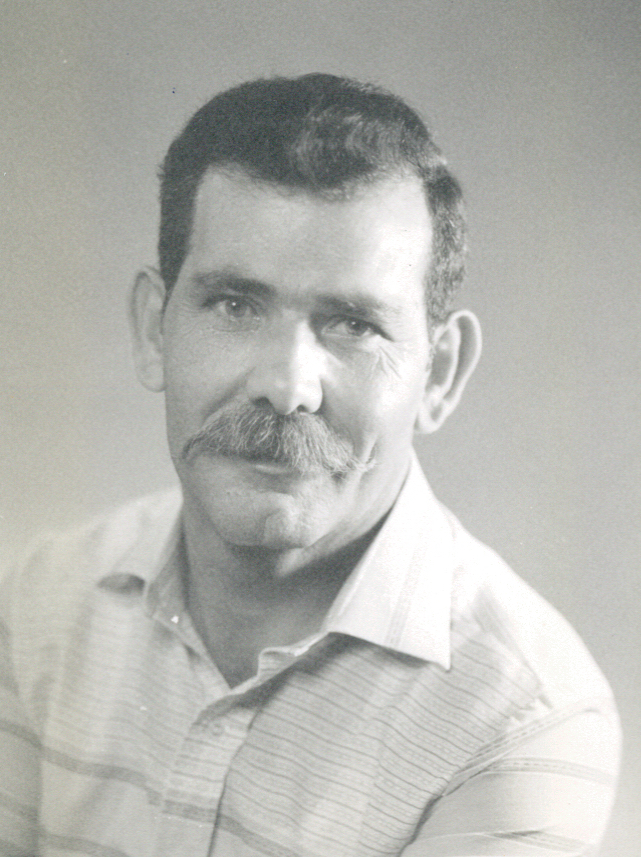
- Naim during his time in the Knesset

Faction represented in the Knesset
- 1981–1984: Alignment

Personal details
- Born: 31 December 1935 Benghazi, Libya
- Died: 7 September 2009 (aged 73)

Ra'anan Naim (Hebrew: רענן נעים; 31 December 1935 – 7 September 2009) was an Israeli politician who served as a member of the Knesset for the Alignment from 1981 to 1984.

== Biography ==
Born in Benghazi in Libya in 1935, Naim made aliyah to Israel in 1949. He attended the Hebrew school established by the Jewish Brigade, as well as the Ben Shemen Agricultural School and Beit Berl. He worked as an agricultural trainer in Kfar Hoshen, and in 1963 was amongst the people who re-established moshav Ramot Naftali. He served as secretary of the purchasing organisation of the Galilee moshavim, and also as director of the Moshavim Movement in the Galilee region.

In 1981 he was elected to the Knesset on the Alignment list, and served on the Economic Affairs committee. He lost his seat in the 1984 elections. In the 1988 elections he headed a new party, the Movement for Moshavim, but it failed to cross the electoral threshold.

He died in 2009 at the age of 73.
