= David Mena =

David Mena may refer to:

- David Mena (politician) (1953–2026), Israeli politician and lawyer
- David Mena (footballer) (born 1992), Colombian footballer
