= Michael Reisser =

Israeli politician

- מיכאל רייסר
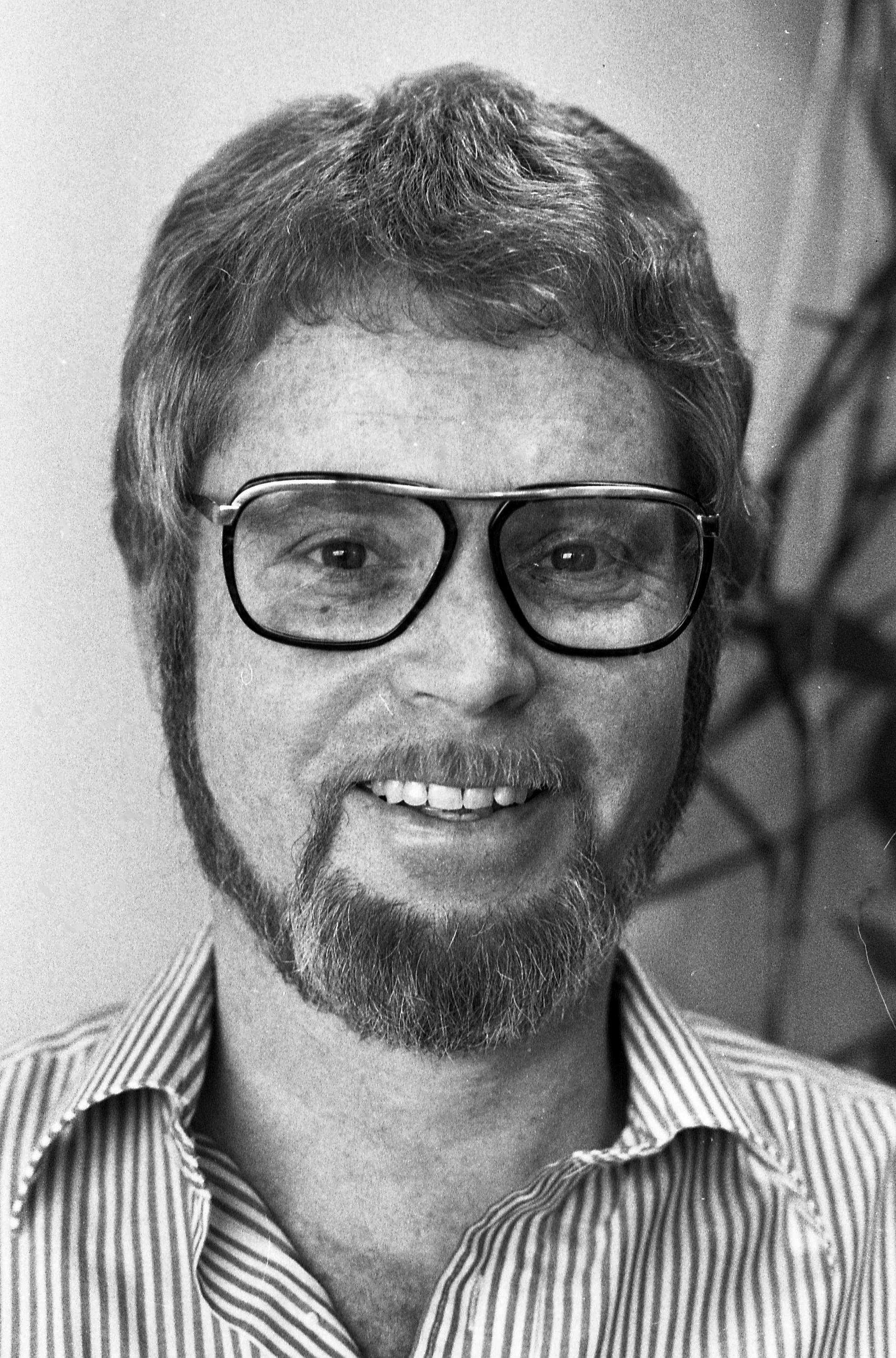
- Reisser in 1982

Faction represented in the Knesset
- 1981–1988: Likud

Personal details
- Born: 26 April 1946; Tel Aviv, Mandatory Palestine
- Died: 27 October 1988 (aged 42)

Michael "Mikha" Reisser (Hebrew: מיכאל רייסר; 26 April 1946 – 27 October 1988) was an Israeli politician who served as a member of the Knesset for Likud between 1981 and his death in 1988.

== Biography ==
Born in Tel Aviv towards the end of the Mandate era, Reisser was educated at the Shalva gymnasium, before studying sociology and labour studies at Tel Aviv University. He became chairman of the university's student union in 1970, and from 1971 until 1977 chaired the secretariat of the Herut young guard.

In 1978 he started working as a consultant to the Minister of Immigrant Absorption and Minister of Housing. He went on to become deputy director of the Housing Ministry and director of the Israel Builders Association from 1979 until 1981. He also became chairman of the board at HaYekev in 1981, and was a member of the board at the ATA textiles company from 1981 until 1984.

From 1979 until 1980 he chaired Herut's Organisation Department. The following year he was elected to the Knesset on the Likud list (then an alliance of Herut and other right-wing parties). He was re-elected in 1984, and became chairman of the House Committee. However, on 26 October 1988, he was fatally injured in a car crash whilst on a journey to Jerusalem for a photoshoot for the upcoming elections when his car crashed into another car being driven by future politician Dalia Itzik, and died of his injuries the following day. His Knesset seat was taken by David Mor.

Reisser was married with a son and twin daughters. All three of his children became religious after his death.

Beitar Avraham Be'er Sheva's stadium, a junior high school and winery club in Rishon LeZion, streets in Lod and Ramla, and a playground in Nahariya are named after him.
