= Yahad (1984 political party) =

Yahad יחד
- Leader: Ezer Weizman
- Merged into: Alignment
- Ideology: Centrism; Liberal Zionism; Two-state solution Anti-settlement
- Political position: Center
- Most MKs: 3 (1984)

Election symbol
- ט ط

Yahad (Hebrew: יחד, lit. 'Together', Arabic: ياحد) was a centrist political party in Israel during the 1980s.

== Background ==
The party was formed by Ezer Weizman prior to the 1984 elections. Weizman had previously been an MK for Likud during the ninth Knesset, but had been ejected from the party after taking dovish positions on disputes concerning the peace process and settlements in the West Bank and for considering forming a new party with Moshe Dayan.

Because Yahad campaigned heavily for a two-state solution, it tried to appeal to Arab voters, with Weizman appearing at community events and festivals in Arab towns like Kafr Qara with Yahad's sixth's placed candidate, Muhammad Masarwa.

Weizman hoped that together it would become the third largest party and invested a lot of money in campaign advertisements, including front-page sections on Arabic-language newspapers and early sections on Hebrew-language newspapers. However, the party won three seats in the election, taken by Weizman, Binyamin Ben-Eliezer and Shlomo Amar. They were invited to join Yitzhak Shamir's coalition government, and Weizman became Minister without Portfolio.

Shortly after the Knesset came into session, the party joined the Alignment. Weizman became Minister of Science and Technology in the twelfth Knesset, and later served as President of Israel from 1993 to 2000. Ben-Eliezer later served as Minister of Housing and Construction, Minister of Communications, Minister of Defence and Minister of National Infrastructure, whilst Amar failed to retain his seat in the 1988 elections.
