= Shimon Ben-Shlomo =

Israeli politician

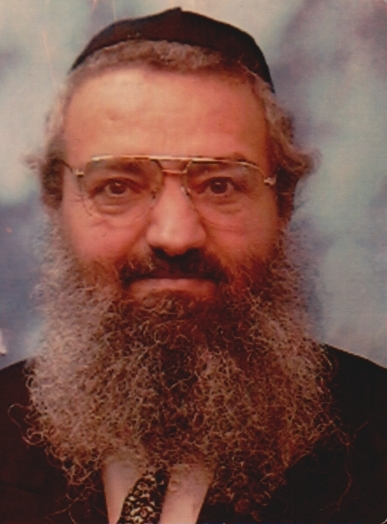
- Ben-Shlomo in the 1980s

Faction represented in the Knesset
- 1984-1988: Shas
- 1988: Independent

Personal details
- Born: 1942 (age 82–83) Yemen

Shimon Ben-Shlomo (Hebrew: שמעון בן שלמה; born 1942) is an Israeli former politician who served as a member of the Knesset between 1984 and 1988.

== Biography ==
Born in Yemen in 1942, Ben-Shimon emigrated to Israel in 1949. He studied at Be'er Ya'akov yeshiva, before attending the Advanced Religious Teachers Seminary in Beit Shemesh.

He joined the new Shas party in the early 1980s, and was elected to the Knesset on its list in 1984. He sat on the Finance, Foreign Affairs and Defense and the Labor and Welfare Committees, and caused controversy when claiming that IDF soldiers "were killed in Lebanon because of licentiousness in the army". On 27 September 1988 he left Shas to sit as an independent. In the November 1988 elections he headed a new party named Yishai, but it received only 2,947 votes, failing to cross the electoral threshold, resulting in Ben-Shlomo losing his seat.
