= Arab Democratic Party (Israel) =

- Leader: Taleb el-Sana; Abdulwahab Darawshe; Mohammed Darawshe
- Founded: 15 February 1988
- Split from: Alignment
- Ideology: Israeli Arab interests Two-state solution Non-Zionism
- National affiliation: Ra'am (1996–2012); Arab List (2015); Joint List (2021–2022)
- Colours: Dark blue Yellow; Dark green (until 2019)
- Current MKs: 0 / 120

Election symbol
- ע (1988–1999; 2015–2019) עם (1999–2015) ר (2019–2021) צכ (2021–)

Website
- arabvoice.co.il

The Arab Democratic Party (Hebrew: מפלגה דמוקרטית ערבית, romanized: Miflaga Demokratit Aravit; Arabic: الحزب الديمقراطي العربي, romanized: al-Hizb ad-Dimuqrati al-Arabi), commonly known in Israel by its Hebrew acronym Mada (מד"ע), is a political party in Israel. Between the mid-1990s and 2012 it was a faction within the United Arab List.

== Background ==
The party was formed on 15 February 1988, towards the end of the term of the eleventh Knesset, when Abdulwahab Darawshe broke away from the Alignment to create his own faction in protest at the party's policy on the First Intifada. At the time of its founding, the party was the only solely Israeli Arab faction in the Knesset (although the Progressive List for Peace's only MK was an Israeli Arab, the party also had Jewish membership), and the first since the demise of the original United Arab List in the 1981 elections.

In the 1988 elections the party just crossed the electoral threshold of 1%, winning 1.2% of the vote and one seat, taken by Darawshe, and was again the only Israeli-Arab party to win a seat. The 1992 elections saw the party win two seats, though it remained the only Israeli Arab party with parliamentary representation. For the 1996 elections, the party ran in an alliance with the new United Arab List under the name Mada-Ra'am (the acronyms of each party). The alliance was successful, winning two seats. The party was also joined in the Knesset by a new Israeli Arab party, Balad, which had run in an alliance with Hadash. After the 1996 elections, the party became a faction within Ra'am, a position it retained until Taleb el-Sana broke away from Ra'am in December 2012.

The party contested the 2015 elections as part of the Arab List, an alliance with the Arab National Party headed by Muhamad Kanan. The alliance received just 4,301 votes (0.11%), failing to win a seat. It submitted a candidate list for the 2021 elections under the name Ma'an – Together for a New Era, although it later withdrew from the elections and endorsed the Joint List, which it also committed to joining.

== Election results ==
Election	Leader	Votes	%	Seats	+/−	Status
1988	Abdulwahab Darawshe	27,012	1.18 (#15)	1 / 120	–	Opposition
1992	Abdulwahab Darawshe	40,788	1.56 (#10)	2 / 120	▲1	Opposition
1996	Abdulwahab Darawshe	with Ra'am		2 / 120	Steady	Opposition
1999	Abdulwahab Darawshe	with Ra'am		2 / 120	Steady	Opposition
2003	Abdulwahab Darawshe	with Ra'am		1 / 120	▼1	Opposition
2006	Taleb el-Sana	with Ra'am and Ta'al		1 / 120	Steady	Opposition
2009	Taleb el-Sana	with Ra'am and Ta'al		1 / 120	Steady	Opposition
2013	did not contest			0 / 120	▼1	Extra-parliamentary
2015	Mohammed Darawshe	part of the Arab List		0 / 120	Steady	Extra-parliamentary
Apr 2019	Mohammed Darawshe	part of the Arab List		0 / 120	Steady	Extra-parliamentary
Sep 2019	did not contest			0 / 120	Steady	Extra-parliamentary
2020	did not contest			0 / 120	Steady	Extra-parliamentary
2021	Mohammed Darawshe	253	0.01 (#35)	0 / 120	Steady	Extra-parliamentary
2022	did not contest			0 / 120	Steady	Extra-parliamentary
