= Rafael Suissa =

Israeli politician (born 1935)

- רפאל סוויסה
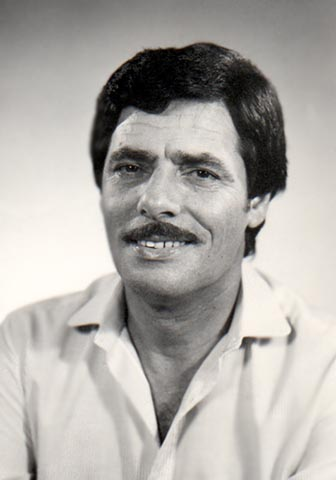
- Suissa during his time in the Knesset

Faction represented in the Knesset
- 1981–1984: Alignment

Personal details
- Born: 5 January 1935; Casablanca, Morocco
- Died: 4 March 2024 (aged 89)

Rafael "Rafi" Suissa (Hebrew: רפאל "רפי" סוויסה; 5 January 1935 – 4 March 2024) was an Israeli politician who served as a member of the Knesset for the Alignment between 1981 and 1984, and as mayor of Mazkeret Batya on three occasions.

== Biography ==
Born in Casablanca in Morocco in 1935, Suissa emigrated to Israel in 1950 and was amongst the founders of moshav Komemiyut. He served in the IDF and was injured during the Suez Crisis. Between 1950 and 1960 he worked as director of an unemployment office in Yavne, and for Amidar between 1950 and 1956. In 1956 he moved to Mazkeret Batya and in 1965 was elected onto its local council, holding the posts of director of the labor department, secretary and treasurer. During 1969 he served as mayor.

After the formation of the Labor Party by a merger of Mapai, Rafi and Ahdut HaAvoda, Suissa became a member of its secretariat and central committee, and chaired its Judea branch. He was elected to the Knesset on the Alignment list (an alliance of the Labor Party and Mapam) in 1981 and sat on the Internal Affairs and Environment Committee until losing his seat in the 1984 elections. He also served as mayor of Mazkeret Batya again between 1982 and 1984.

Between 1984 and 1986 he worked as Commissioner of the Israel Prison Service, and also founded the Association to Rehabilitate Prisoners.

In the 1988 Knesset elections he headed a party named the Movement for Social Justice, but it won only 3,222 votes (0.1%) and failed to cross the electoral threshold. He became mayor of Mazkeret Batya again in 1993, holding the post until 2003. He later joined Kadima, and was placed 113th on its list in 2006 and 115th in 2009. He remained a member of Mazkeret Batya council for several years.

He died in March 2024 aged 89.
