= Mohammed Miari =

Arab-Israeli politician (born 1939)

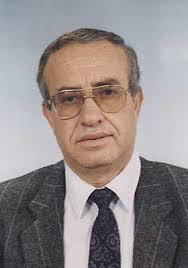

Faction represented in the Knesset
- 1984–1992: Progressive List for Peace

Personal details
- Born: 12 April 1939 (age 87) Al-Birwa, Mandatory Palestine

Mohammed Miari (Arabic: محمد ميعاري, Hebrew: מוחמד מיעארי; born 12 April 1939) is an Israeli Arab former politician who headed the Progressive List for Peace during the 1980s and early 1990s.

== Biography ==
Miari was born during the Mandate era in al-Birwa, a village which was depopulated as a result of the 1948 Arab-Israeli War. He grew up in Makr and attended high school in Kafr Yasif, and was also a member of the Arab Youth Pioneer movement. He later studied law at the Hebrew University of Jerusalem, and was certified as a lawyer.

Whilst at university, he became active in Arab student politics. He was amongst the founders of the al-Ard movement, was placed third on the Arab Socialist List for the 1965 Knesset elections, although the list was eventually prevented from running by the Central Elections Committee.

In 1984 he was amongst the founders of the Progressive List for Peace, and was elected to the Knesset in the elections that year. During his first term in office he was a member of the Internal Affairs and Environment Committee. The party was initially banned from contesting the 1988 elections by the Central Elections Committee on the basis that it violated the Basic Law on the Knesset, which stated that parties should not aim for a "negation of the State of Israel as the state of the Jewish people". The PLFP appealed to the Supreme Court and the ban was overturned. Miari was re-elected, though the party was reduced to a single seat. He lost his seat in the 1992 elections, in which the PLFP won only 0.9% of the vote, failing to cross the 1.5% electoral threshold.

During his time in the Knesset, there were two attempts to remove his parliamentary immunity; one over his attendance at a meeting in memory of Fuad Kawasme, who had been removed from his position as mayor of Hebron, and the second for meeting PLO leaders in 1988 and a press conference at which he expressed support for the First Intifada. Both attempts failed.

He later joined Balad, and was given the symbolic last place on its list for the 2003 elections. He left Balad in 2014 due to the party's criticism of Bashar al-Assad's conduct during the Syrian Civil War, becoming leader of a breakaway movement named Kapah (Struggle).
