= Abdulwahab Darawshe =

Israeli Arab politician (1943–2026)

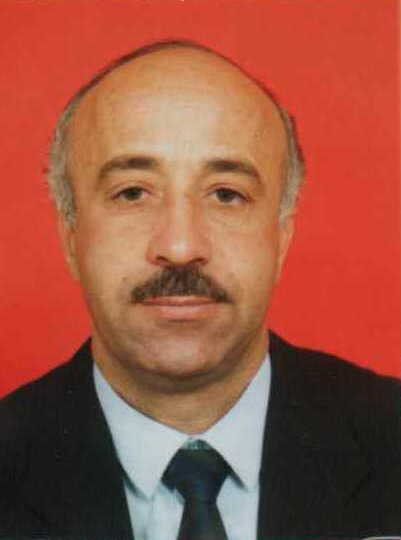

Faction represented in the Knesset
- 1984–1988: Alignment
- 1988–1999: Arab Democratic Party

Personal details
- Born: 12 October 1943 Iksal, Mandatory Palestine
- Died: 10 March 2026 (aged 82) Iksal, Israel

Abdulwahab Darawshe (Arabic: عبد الوهاب دراوشة, Hebrew: עבד-אלוהאב דראושה; 12 October 1943 – 10 March 2026) was an Israeli Arab politician who served as a member of the Knesset for the Alignment and the Arab Democratic Party between 1984 and 1999.

== Life and career ==
Abdulwahab Darawshe was born on 12 October 1943 in Iksal, Mandatory Palestine. He studied at Nazareth High School, before graduating from the University of Haifa with a degree in education and history. He worked as a teacher and headmaster, also serving as a national supervisor for the Ministry of Education, a member of the board of the Teachers' Union's central committee, a member of the Education Institute for Jewish-Arab Coexistence's board, and chairman of the Arab Association for Education and Grants in Nazareth.

Darawshe was first elected to the Knesset on the Alignment's list in 1984. On 15 February 1988, he left the alliance to found his own single-member faction, which was named the Arab Democratic Party on 7 March.

His new party won 1.2% of the vote in the November 1988 election, just crossing the electoral threshold (1%), and winning a single seat, taken by Darawshe. He retained his seat again in the 1992 elections, after which the party gained a seat. During his third term in the Knesset, Darawshe chaired the subcommittee for Arab Education and the subcommittee for the Advancement of the Status of Arab Women.

For the 1996 elections, Darawshe's party ran a joint list with the United Arab List, winning four seats, with Darawshe chairing the alliance's parliamentary group. He lost his seat in the 1999 elections. For the 2009 elections, he was placed 114th on the United Arab List-Ta'al list.

Darawshe died at his home in Iksal, on 10 March 2026, at the age of 82.
