= 1988 Israeli legislative election =

- 1 November 1988
- All 120 seats in the Knesset; 61 seats needed for a majority
- Turnout: 79.66% (▲0.88pp)
Party	Leader	Vote %	Seats	+/–
Likud	Yitzhak Shamir	31.07	40	−1
Alignment	Shimon Peres	30.02	39	−5
Shas	Yitzhak Haim Peretz	4.72	6	+2
Agudat Yisrael	Moshe Ze'ev Feldman	4.50	5	+3
Ratz	Shulamit Aloni	4.27	5	+2
Mafdal	Avner Hai Shaki	3.93	5	+1
Hadash	Meir Vilner	3.68	4	0
Tehiya	Yuval Ne'eman	3.10	3	−1
Mapam	Yair Tzaban	2.47	3	−3
Tzomet	Rafael Eitan	1.99	2	+1
Moledet	Rehavam Ze'evi	1.93	2	New
Centre-Shinui	Amnon Rubinstein	1.73	2	−1
Degel HaTorah	Avraham Ravitz	1.50	2	New
PLFP	Mohammed Miari	1.48	1	−1
Mada	Abdulwahab Darawshe	1.18	1	New
This lists parties that won seats. See the complete results below.
Prime Minister before	Prime Minister after
Yitzhak Shamir; Likud	Yitzhak Shamir; Likud

Legislative elections were held in Israel on 1 November 1988. Voter turnout was 80%.

== Parliament factions ==
The table below lists the parliamentary factions represented in the 11th Knesset.

Name	Ideology	Symbol	Leader	1984 result		Seats at 1988 dissolution
Name	Ideology	Symbol	Leader	Votes (%)	Seats	Seats at 1988 dissolution
Alignment	Social democracy Labor Zionism	אמת	Shimon Peres	34.9% (Note: Mapam had been part of the Alignment since 1969, but the party broke away prior to the 1988 election as a gesture of disapproval of the national unity government with Likud.)	38 / 120	38 / 120
Mapam	Labor Zionism; Democratic socialism	מפם	Yair Tzaban	34.9%	6 / 120	5 / 120
Likud	National liberalism	מחל	Yitzhak Shamir	31.9%	41 / 120	43 / 120
Tehiya	Ultranationalism; Revisionist Zionism	ת	Yuval Ne'eman; Rafael Eitan	4.0%	5 / 120	4 / 120
Mafdal	Religious Zionism	ב	Yosef Burg	3.5%	4 / 120	5 / 120
Hadash	Communism; Socialism	ו	Meir Vilner	3.4%	4 / 120	5 / 120
Shas	Religious conservatism Populism	שס	Yitzhak Peretz	3.1%	4 / 120	3 / 120
Shinui	Liberalism; Centrism	הן	Amnon Rubinstein	2.7%	3 / 120	4 / 120
Ratz	Progressivism; Secularism	רצ	Shulamit Aloni	2.4%	3 / 120	4 / 120
Yahad	Centrism	ט	Ezer Weizman	2.2%	3 / 120	0 / 120
PLP	Pacifism	פ	Mohammed Miari	1.8%	2 / 120	2 / 120
Agudat Yisrael	Religious conservatism	ג	Avraham Yosef Shapira	1.7%	2 / 120	2 / 120
Morasha	Religious conservatism Social conservatism	עד	Haim Drukman	1.6%	2 / 120	1 / 120
Tzomet	Agrarianism; Zionism	ץ	Rafael Eitan	-	0 / 120	1 / 120
Tami	Religious Zionism; Economic egalitarianism	ני	Aharon Abuhatzira	1.5%	1 / 120	0 / 120
Kach (Note: Kach was disqualified from running in the 1988 elections for violation of the amended Basic Law: the Knesset.)	Religious Zionism; Kahanism	כך	Meir Kahane	1.2%	1 / 120	1 / 120
Ometz	National liberalism	יש	Yigal Hurvitz	1.2%	1 / 120	0 / 120
Mada	Israeli Arab interests	ע	Abdulwahab Darawshe	-	0 / 120	1 / 120
Independent	-	-	-	-	0 / 120	1 / 120

== Campaign ==
On 8 October 1988, the Alignment leader Shimon Peres visited the Likud stronghold Beit Shemesh, near Jerusalem. There, he was greeted by a mob of angry protesters, who called him "Peres Arafat", a "traitor", and a "maniac", and threw buckets of cold water at him, forcing dozens of police officers being called to guide Peres away from the demonstrators.

On the same day, Ratz's Yossi Sarid unsuccessfully testified to the Central Elections Committee to block the ultranationalist pro-transfer Moledet party from running, while the Progressive leader Muhammad Miari demanded to disqualify Moledet, Tehiya and Tzomet. This came as the Justice Minister Avraham Sharir (Likud) tried to get Miari arrested for meeting with Yasser Arafat.

Ratz's surge in the polls caused fear among the right-wing parties. Likud's youth wing handed out letters saying, "If you want a big strong Ratz, but in opposition, vote for Ratz, but if you want a smaller Ratz, but in government, vote for the Alignment."

During the campaign, left-wing parties were in a state of conflict. Mapam and Ratz rejected the possibility of running on a joint list. When Ratz signed a surplus vote agreement with the Alignment, Mapam accused Ratz of wanting to "remove Mapam from the political scene", to which Ratz leader Shulamit Aloni responded by saying that "Mapam's panic is understandable. It is a spoiled party, rich in assets and jobs, which fears any young, fresh organization without vested economic interests that comes to fight with clean hands." She also highlighted the inevitability of the two parties becoming allies, comparing Mapam to the biblical character Saul throwing his spear at David. Further to the left, there was outright hostility between the Progressive List for Peace and Hadash, resulting in physical altercations between their activists.

The PLP criticised Ratz for giving its 'unconditional' support to Shimon Peres's bid to become prime minister, while ignoring the fact that Peres was set to appoint Yitzhak Rabin, who the PLP called 'a minister of blood and gore', as Defense Minister. The PLP criticised Ratz, Hadash, Mapam and Shinui for not assembling a coherent singular force for peace in the Knesset. The PLP also stated they would not support a Peres-led government if it was not up to their standards.

The Jericho bus firebombing, which killed an Israeli mother and her three children, galvanised voters to force a last-minute swing to the right, just when the Alignment was gaining on the Likud in polls.

=== Party slogans ===
Party or alliance	Original slogan	English translation	Refs
Likud	"͏͏͏͏͏͏͏͏͏͏͏͏רק הליכוד יכול"	"Only the Likud can"	
Alignment	"המערך, הדרך לפריצת דרך"	"The Alignment, the path to a breakthrough"	
Mafdal	"צריך אמונה במדינה"	"We need faith in the country"	
Mapam	"הפעם מפם"	"This time, Mapam"	
Hadash	"שתי מדינות לשני העמים"	"Two states for two peoples"	
Ratz	"העובדות מצביעות רצ"	"The facts point to Ratz"	
Shinui	"יש פתרון שפוי- המרכז: שינוי!"	"There is a sensible solution, the centre - Shinui!"	
Tehiya	"זה הזמן להתעורר לתחייה"	"It's time to wake up to Tehiya [a revival]"	
Tzomet	"כל הדרכים מובילות לצומת"	"All roads lead to Tzomet [crossroad]"	
Moledet	"מולדת יש רק אחת"	"There is only one homeland"	
Degel HaTorah	"הפעם יש ברירה- דגל התורה"	"This time there is a choice - Degel HaTorah"	

=== Debates ===
Date	Organizer	Moderator	P Present I Invitee N Non-invitee		
Date	Organizer	Moderator	Likud	Alignment	Refs
			P Yitzhak Shamir	P Shimon Peres	

=== Surplus-vote agreements ===
Two parties could make a surplus-vote agreement so that they were considered to be running on a joint list when leftover seats were distributed. The Bader–Ofer method favors larger lists, meaning that a joint list is more likely to receive leftover seats than each list would individually. If such a joint list were to receive a leftover seat, the Bader–Ofer method would be applied a second time to determine which of the parties that make up the joint list would receive it. The following agreements were signed by parties prior to the election:

- Alignment-Ratz
- Shas-Degel HaTorah
- Mapam-Shinui
- Likud-Tehiya
- The Movement for a Just Society - Yemenite Association in Israel

== Opinion polls ==
The Israel Broadcasting Authority separated the parties into two blocs:

- Left-wing:
  - Jewish: Alignment, Ratz, Mapam, Shinui, Meimad
  - Arab: Hadash, PLP, Mada
- Right-wing:
  - Secular: Likud, Tehiya, Tzomet, Moledet. Hadashot also included Kach in this grouping.
  - Religious: Agudat Yisrael, Shas, Degel HaTorah, Mafdal, Morasha (dropped out in August 1988).

Ometz dissolved into Likud, and Yahad ran as part of the Alignment.

Ma'ariv polled Morasha together with Mafdal.

=== Seat projections ===
Note: Political blocs do not necessarily determine the exact makeup of post-election coalitions. Hadashot published polls in percentages, which have been approximated into seat totals through the D'Hondt method, assuming surplus-vote agreements stay the same when possible.

Some polls gave certain seat totals as a range of numbers, for which the average has been given.

Date	Poll client	Likud	Alignment	Mapam	Tehiya	Tzomet	Hadash	PLP	Mada	Shinui	Ratz	Morasha	Mafdal	Shas	Agudat Yisrael	Degel	Kach	Moledet	Meimad	Others	Lead	Left	Right	Lead
Final results		40	39	3	3	2	4	1	1	2	5	defunct	5	6	5	2	banned	2	0	0	1	50	70	20
1 November 1988	Exit poll on Channel 1	40	40	3	3	2	5	2	0	2	6	defunct	5	5	2	1	banned	2	0	0	Tie	58	62	4
30 October 1988	Smith Research Center	40	41	3	6	N/A	N/A	N/A	N/A	N/A	6	defunct	N/A	5	N/A	N/A	banned	1	0	N/A	1	N/A	N/A	N/A
28 October 1988	Tazpit Institute	40	43	2	5	1	6	2		2	7	defunct	3	3	2	1	banned	1	1	0	3	63	57	6
28 October 1988	Modi'in Ezrachi	43	33	3	8	2	8			1	8	defunct	5	4	2	1	banned	1	1	0	10	55	65	10
28 October 1988	Israel Research Institute	40	42	2	7	1.5	4	3.5		1	6	defunct	3.5	4	2	1.5	banned	1.5	1.5	0	2	60	60	Tie
21 October 1988	Israel Research Institute	40	42	2	7	1	6			1.5	6.5	defunct	3.5	3.5	2	1.5	banned	N/A	0.5	1.5 (Note: Pensioners - 1.5)	2	58.5	60	1.5
20 October 1988	Modi'in Ezrachi	40	33	3	7	2	8			1	9	defunct	5	3	2	1	5	N/A	N/A	0	7	54	66	12
6-10 October 1988	Hadashot	38	44	2	6	1	4	2	2	2	7	defunct	5	2	2		1	1	1	0	6	63	57	6
4 October 1988		The Central Elections Committee forbids Kach from running in the election																						
2-8 October 1988	Hadashot	41	38	2	7	3	6			2	4	defunct	10				6	N/A	N/A	N/A	3	52	68	16
October 1988	Maariv	41	34	2	7	2	8			1	8	defunct	4	3	3	N/A	6	N/A	1	N/A	7	54	66	12
26 August-8 October 1988	Hadashot	39	37	2	7	3	7			2	7	defunct	8				8	0	N/A	0	2	55	65	10
23 September 1988	Hadashot	43	39	2	6	1	4	2	1	2	6	defunct	6	3	2	N/A	2	N/A	1	0	4	61	59	2
August-5 September 1988	Hadashot	36	46	2	4	3	7		N/A	2	7	defunct	4	3	2	N/A	2	1	1	0	10	63	57	6
May-October 1988	Hadashot	39	39	2	8	3	7			1	8	9					4	N/A	N/A	0	Tie	57	63	6
August 1988	Maariv	42	34	2	7	1	7			2	6	5		4	3	N/A	7	N/A	N/A	0	8	51	69	18
July 1988	Maariv	41	35	2	7	3	7			2	7	4		3	3	N/A	6	N/A	N/A	0	6	53	67	14
June 1988	Hadashot	40	45	1	7	1	4	2	N/A	2	5	N/A	5	3	3	N/A	2	N/A	N/A	0	5	59	61	2
March 1988	Hadashot	44	41	1	6	1	4	2	N/A	2	6	N/A	5	4	2	N/A	2	N/A	N/A	0	3	56	64	8
15 February 1988		Abdulwahab Darawshe leaves the Alignment to establish the Arab Democratic Party (Mada)																						
January 1988	Hadashot	38	44	1	5	1	4	2	not founded	2	6	N/A	6	5	3	N/A	4	N/A	N/A	0	6	59	61	2
25 December 1987	Hadashot	37	46	1	6	N/A	6		not founded	3	5	N/A	5	5	2	not founded	2	not founded	not founded	0	11	61	59	2
December 1987		Tzomet splits from Tehiya and becomes an independent party again																						
June 1987	Ma'ariv	36	46	2	8		6		not founded	2	5	N/A	4	4	2	not founded	5	not founded	not founded	0	10	61	59	2
March 1987	Ma'ariv	35	48	2	7		6		not founded	2	4	N/A	6	4	2	not founded	4	not founded	not founded	0	13	62	58	4
27 January 1987	Ma'ariv	34	53	2	6		6		not founded	3	5	N/A	4	4	1	not founded	2	not founded	not founded	0	19	67	53	14
July 1986	Ma'ariv	32	51	2	9		6		not founded	2	6	1	4	3	2	not founded	2	not founded	not founded	0	19	67	53	14
June 1986		Tzomet folds into Tehiya																						
28 February 1986	Ma'ariv	30	55	2	7		6		not founded	1	5	1	4	4	2	not founded	2	not founded	not founded	0	25	69	51	18
November 1985	Ma'ariv	32	53	1	8		6		not founded	2	4	1	3	3	2	not founded	5	not founded	not founded	0	21	66	54	12
September 1985	Ma'ariv	30	51	1	8		6		not founded	1	7	1	3	3	2	not founded	7	not founded	not founded	0	21	66	54	12
9 August 1985	Hadashot	33	51	1	6		6 (Note: Unknown if figure includes Progressives)	N/A	not founded	2	4	1	4	2	2	not founded	5.5	not founded	not founded	2.5 (Note: Tami - 1)	18	64	54.5	9.5
11 June 1985		HaBonim train-bus collision, 22 (mostly children) killed, Shas blames the victims for violating Shabbat, leading to public outrage																						
1 June 1985		1985 Israel Economic Stabilization Plan introduced																						
23 September 1984		Mapam leaves the Alignment																						
Outgoing Knesset		42	38 (Note: All 6 Mapam MKs left the Alignment in 1984, and afterwards 1 MK each defected to Shinui, Ratz and Mada. Yahad's 3 MKs joined the Alignment.)	5	4	1	5	2	1	4	4	1	5	3	2	not founded	1	not founded	not founded	1	1	57	63	6
1984 results		42 (Note: Including Ometz)	47 (Note: With Yahad. Mapam won 6 seats in the Knesset in 1984, as part of the Alignment.)		5		4	2	not founded	3	3	2	4	4	2	not founded	1	not founded	not founded	1 (Note: Tami)	5	57	63	6

== Results ==
Party	Votes	%	Seats	+/–
Likud	709,305	31.07	40	−1
Alignment	685,363	30.02	39	−5
Shas	107,709	4.72	6	+2
Agudat Yisrael	102,714	4.50	5	+3
Ratz	97,513	4.27	5	+2
National Religious Party	89,720	3.93	5	+1
Hadash	84,032	3.68	4	0
Tehiya	70,730	3.10	3	−2
Mapam	56,345	2.47	3	New
Tzomet	45,489	1.99	2	New
Moledet	44,174	1.93	2	New
Shinui	39,538	1.73	2	−1
Degel HaTorah	34,279	1.50	2	New
Progressive List for Peace	33,695	1.48	1	−1
Arab Democratic Party	27,012	1.18	1	New
Pensioners	16,674	0.73	0	New
Meimad	15,783	0.69	0	New
Derekh Aretz	4,253	0.19	0	New
LeOrr Movement	4,182	0.18	0	New
Movement for Social Justice	3,222	0.14	0	New
Yishai – Tribal Israel Together	2,947	0.13	0	New
Movement for Moshavim	2,838	0.12	0	New
Tarshish	1,654	0.07	0	New
Silent Power	1,579	0.07	0	New
Movement for Discharged Soldiers	1,018	0.04	0	New
Yemenite Association	909	0.04	0	New
Unity	446	0.02	0	0
Total	2,283,123	100.00	120	0
Valid votes	2,283,123	99.03		
Invalid/blank votes	22,444	0.97		
Total votes	2,305,567	100.00		
Registered voters/turnout	2,894,267	79.66		
Source: IDI, Nohlen et al.

Political observers noted that if Hadash and the Progressive List for Peace had made a surplus vote agreement, the latter would have won a surplus seat, which was ultimately won by the Shas-Degel surplus agreement.

== Aftermath ==
Likud's Yitzhak Shamir formed the twenty-third government on 22 December 1988, including the Alignment, the National Religious Party, Shas, Agudat Yisrael and Degel HaTorah in his coalition, with 25 ministers.

In 1990 Shimon Peres tried to form an Alignment-led coalition in a move that became known as "the dirty trick", but failed to win sufficient support. Eventually Shamir formed the twenty-fourth government on 11 June 1990, with a coalition encompassing Likud, the National Religious Party, Shas, Agudat Yisrael, Degel HaTorah, the New Liberal Party, Tehiya, Tzomet, Moledet, Unity for Peace and Immigration and Geulat Yisrael. Tehiya, Tzomet and Moledet all left the coalition in late 1991/early 1992 in protest at Shamir's participation in the Madrid Conference.

Several defections occurred during the Knesset term; five members of Likud left to form the Party for the Advancement of the Zionist Idea. After two of them returned, the party was renamed the New Liberal Party. Yitzhak Peretz left Shas and established Moria. Eliezer Mizrahi left Agudat Yisrael and established Geulat Yisrael. Efraim Gur left the Alignment to establish Unity for Peace and Immigration, which later merged into Likud.

The Twelfth Knesset saw the rise of the ultra-orthodox religious parties as a significant force in Israeli politics, and as a crucial "swing" element which could determine which of the large two secular parties (Likud, Alignment) would get to form the coalition government. Ratz, Mapam, and Shinui merged into Meretz, while Black Panthers broke away from Hadash.
