= Party lists for the 1992 Israeli legislative election =

The 1992 Israeli legislative election was held using closed list proportional representation. Each party presented a list of candidates to the Central Elections Committee prior to the election.

== Labor ==
The Israeli Labor Party's list was headed by Yitzhak Rabin.

1. Yitzhak Rabin
2. Shimon Peres
3. Avraham Burg
4. Binyamin Ben-Eliezer
5. Ora Namir
6. Haim Ramon
7. Michael Harish
8. Yisrael Keisar
9. David Libai
10. Nissim Zvili
11. Shimon Sheetrit
12. Uzi Baram
13. Rafi Elul
14. Ori Orr
15. Avraham Shochat
16. Shevah Weiss
17. Hagai Meirom
18. Masha Lubelsky
19. Eli Ben-Menachem
20. Nawaf Massalha
21. Moshe Shahal
22. Ra'anan Cohen
23. Eli Dayan
24. Yossi Beilin
25. Dalia Itzik
26. Gedalia Gal
27. Efraim Sneh
28. Micha Goldman
29. Avi Yehezkel
30. Salah Tarif
31. Avigdor Kahalani
32. Yossi Katz
33. Rafael Edri
34. Mordechai Gur
35. Ya'akov Shefi
36. Eli Goldschmidt
37. Yael Dayan
38. Gideon Sagi
39. Emanuel Zisman
40. Yoram Lass
41. Yosef Vanunu
42. Shlomo Bohbot
43. Amir Peretz
44. Shmuel Avital
45. Gad Yaacobi
46. Haneh Hadad
47. Avraham Katz-Oz
48. Nava Arad
49. Zvi Nir
50. Pini Shomer
51. Talal Alkernawi
52. Saadia Marciano
53. Yossi Genosar
54. Ofra Friedman
55. Michael Bar-Zohar
56. Dafna Sherfman
57. Ya'akov Tzur
58. Noga Botansky
59. Shalom Fadida
60. Nitza Shapira-Libai
61. Yehuda Doron
62. Yuval Frankel
63. Shalom Perry
64. Yitzhak Valber
65. Ra'anan Naim
66. Yemin Suissa
67. Ronen Karasso
68. Evgeny Tyumkin
69. Ya'akov Dellal
70. Mas'ad Kadur
71. Khalil Qassem
72. Eliyahu Landau
73. Eitan Avivi
74. Tova Zucker
75. Yoram Oberkovich
76. Shlomo Avitan
77. Haim Barnes
78. Michael Sarussi
79. Rafael Bar-Lavi
80. Esther Bitan
81. Katsav Kaduri
82. Liora Langer
83. David Cohen
84. Eyal Pardis
85. Simon Alfasi
86. Adi Eldad
87. Yitzhak Yaron
88. Meir Nitzan
89. Aryeh Gur'el
90. Ya'akov Gil

== Likud ==
The Likud list was led by Yitzhak Shamir.

1. Yitzhak Shamir
2. Moshe Arens
3. Ariel Sharon
4. David Levy
5. Moshe Katsav
6. Benjamin Netanyahu
7. Benny Begin
8. Roni Milo
9. Moshe Nissim
10. Dov Shilansky
11. Meir Sheetrit
12. Eliyahu Ben-Elissar
13. Ehud Olmert
14. Dan Tichon
15. David Magen
16. Dan Meridor
17. Gideon Patt
18. Uzi Landau
19. Shaul Amor
20. Yehoshua Matza
21. Ya'akov Shamai
22. Tzachi Hanegbi
23. Michael Eitan
24. Ovadia Eli
25. David Mena
26. Avraham Hirschson
27. Haim Kaufman
28. Ron Nachman
29. Assad Assad
30. Efraim Gur
31. Limor Livnat
32. Naomi Blumenthal
33. Silvan Shalom
34. Ariel Weinstein
35. Yosef Ahimeir
36. Michael Ratzon
37. Reuven Rivlin
38. Aharon Abuhatzira
39. Gil Samsonov
40. Michael Kleiner
41. Prosper Ezran
42. Yehoshua Sagi
43. Eli Boker
44. Miriam Mazar
45. Israel Katz
46. Yosef Goldberg
47. Yehuda Perah
48. Shlomo Ben-Lulu
49. Avraham Sharir
50. David Re'em
51. Haim Corfu
52. Mordechai Ben-Porat
53. Amal Nasser el-Din
54. Tamar Cohen
55. Daniel Azriel
56. Miriam Glazer-Ta'asa
57. Ze'ev Boim
58. Yishay Tzemach
59. Aharon Greenstein
60. Ezra Binyamini

== Meretz ==
The Meretz list was led by Shulamit Aloni. The list was a joint list between Mapam, Ratz and Shinui.

1. Shulamit Aloni
2. Yair Tzaban
3. Amnon Rubinstein
4. Yossi Sarid
5. Ran Cohen
6. Haim Oron
7. Avraham Poraz
8. David Zucker
9. Walid Haj Yahia
10. Naomi Chazan
11. Binyamin Temkin
12. Anat Maor
13. Yehoshua Porath
14. Najib Abu-Rakya
15. Mordechai Virshubski
16. Shoshanna Arar
17. Naftali Raz
18. Zehava Galon
19. Jamal Knaan
20. Ya'akov Alfasi

== Tzomet ==
The Tzomet list was led by Rafael Eitan.

1. Rafael Eitan
2. Gonen Segev
3. Pini Badash
4. Eliezer Sandberg
5. Moshe Peled
6. Haim Dayan
7. Esther Salmovitz
8. Alex Goldfarb
9. Ahuva Tzean
10. Doron Nehamia
11. Shlomo Levy
12. Adam Ilana
13. Kamal Gevishi
14. Lubov Tumarkin
15. Yitzhak Kashy
16. Yosef Bechar
17. Shmuel Kahana
18. Asher Notta
19. Mira Halevy
20. Sarah Ginzburg

== National Religious Party ==
The National Religious Party list was led by Zevulun Hammer.

1. Zevulun Hammer
2. Avner Shaki
3. Yigal Bibi
4. Yitzhak Levy
5. Hanan Porat
6. Shaul Yahalom
7. Shmaryahu Ben-Tzur
8. Yehudith Huebner
9. Nahum Langental
10. Yosef Mendelevitch
11. Azriel Tsadok
12. Avraham Stern
13. Boaz Levy
14. Moshe Hanya
15. Binyamin Hen
16. Nissim Mantsura
17. Dov Zisman
18. Ehud Gahali
19. Shalom Shukrun
20. Eliezer Sheffer

== Shas ==
The Shas list was led by Aryeh Deri.

1. Aryeh Deri
2. Moshe Maya
3. Yosef Azran
4. Aryeh Gamliel
5. Rafael Pinhasi
6. Shlomo Benizri
7. Yair Levy
8. Eli Yishai
9. Ya'akov Hamad
10. Eli Suissa
11. Yitzhak Idan
12. Mordechai Yitzhari
13. Shalom Sa'adun
14. Zerah Meshulam
15. Eli Tzubary
16. Boris Yitzhakov
17. David Azulai
18. Yitzhak Cohen
19. Shlomo Khemo
20. Shimon Mualem

== United Torah Judaism ==
The United Torah Judaism list was led by Avraham Yosef Shapira.

1. Avraham Yosef Shapira
2. Yitzhak Peretz
3. Menachem Porush
4. Shmuel Halpert
5. Avraham Ravitz
6. Avraham Verdiger
7. Moshe Gafni
8. Moshe Irenstein
9. Haim Brilant
10. Yehezkel Ashaiek

== Hadash ==
The Hadash list was led by Tawfiq Ziad.

1. Tawfiq Ziad
2. Hashem Mahameed
3. Tamar Gozansky
4. Saleh Saleem
5. Mustafa Abu-Ria
6. Hassan Beshara
7. Shalom Shmuel
8. Afif Kial
9. Hussein Al-Ubra
10. Anwar Gabbay

== Moledet ==
The Moledet list was led by Rehavam Ze'evi.

1. Rehavam Ze'evi
2. Shaul Gutman
3. Yosef Ba-Gad
4. Sarah Folk
5. Avraham Yehezkeli
6. Uzi Bar
7. Uri Yaron
8. Rafaela Segal
9. Ya'akov Barkai
10. Roni Visler

== Mada ==
The Mada list was led by Abdulwahab Darawshe.

1. Abdulwahab Darawshe
2. Taleb el-Sana
3. Muhammad Zidan
4. Hana Elias

== Extraparliamentary parties ==
The following are parties which won no seats in the 1992 election.

=== Tehiya ===
The Tehiya party was led by Yuval Ne'eman.

1. Yuval Ne'eman
2. Geulah Cohen
3. Elyakim Haetzni
4. Benny Katzover
5. Yaakov Faitelson

=== Progressive List for Peace ===
The Progressive List for Peace was led by Mohammed Miari.

1. Mohammed Miari
2. Jiris Huri
3. Mansour Tamim
4. Hamad Bassam

=== New Liberal Party ===
The New Liberal Party list was led by Yitzhak Moda'i.

1. Yitzhak Moda'i
2. Eli Landau
3. Pinchas Goldstein
4. Pesah Grupper

=== Geulat Yisrael ===
The Geulat Yisrael list was led by Eliezer Mizrahi.

1. Eliezer Mizrahi
2. Shimon Cohen
3. Zvi Rosenfeld
4. Yitzhak Drexler

=== Movement for Democracy and Aliyah ===
The Movement for Democracy and Aliyah list was led by Yuli Kosharovsky.

1. Yuli Kosharovsky
2. Vladimir Glozman
3. Yisrael Nov
4. Lev Ovsishcher

=== Pensioners, Immigrants and Senior Citizens ===
The Pensioners, Immigrants and Senior Citizens list was led by Aba Gefen.

1. Aba Gefen
2. Alexander Tentser
3. Efraim Melamed
4. Iddo Gur

=== Movement of Mortgage Victims, the Homeless and Veterans ===
The Movement of Mortgage Victims, the Homeless and Veterans list was led by Arnon Aharon.

1. Arnon Aharon
2. Efraim Ozer
3. Aharon Amatzia Michaelis
4. Esther Tzairi

=== Pikanti ===
The Pikanti list was led by Moshe Badash.

1. Moshe Badash
2. Eliyahu Bartzawi
3. Mali Muvka Yariv
4. Nirit Opfel

=== Torah VeArtetz ===
The Torah VeAretz list was led by Moshe Levinger.

1. Moshe Levinger
2. Ya'akov Novick
3. Zion Almaliach
4. Dov Einuch

=== On Wheels ===
The On Wheels list was led by Herzl Hackem.

1. Herzl Hackem
2. Yehuda Savtani
3. Zvi Steinman
4. Zvi Yedidia

=== Women's Party ===
The Women's Party list was led by Ruth Rasnic.

1. Ruth Rasnic
2. Esther Herzog
3. Balhaa Klein
4. Nili Gotin

=== Hatikva ===
The Hatikva list was led by Charlie Biton.

1. Charlie Biton
2. Leah Shkadiel
3. David Hemo
4. Maya Ben-Zion

=== Natural Law Party ===
The Natural Law Party list was led by Gad Tik.

1. Gad Tik
2. Amichay Rokach
3. Reuven Zilinovsky
4. Yehoshua Cohen

=== Tali ===
The Tali list was led by Reuven Golan.

1. Reuven Golan
2. Yehuda Keidar
3. Avraham Kaikov
4. Svetlana Vinnick

=== Tzipor ===
The Tzipor list was led by Zion Yasur, who was the sole candidate on the party's list.
