= List of members of the twelfth Knesset =

The 120 members of the twelfth Knesset were elected on 1 November 1988. The breakdown by party was as follows:

- Likud: 40
- Alignment: 39
- Shas: 6
- Agudat Yisrael: 5
- Ratz: 5
- National Religious Party: 5
- Hadash: 4
- Tehiya: 3
- Mapam: 3
- Tzomet: 2
- Moledet: 2
- Shinui: 2
- Degel HaTorah: 2
- Progressive List for Peace: 1
- Arab Democratic Party: 1

== List of members ==
| Member | Party | Notes |
|---|---|---|
| Aharon Abuhatzira | Likud | |
| Shaul Amor | Likud | |
| Moshe Arens | Likud | |
| Benny Begin | Likud | |
| Eliyahu Ben-Elissar | Likud | |
| Yigal Cohen | Likud | |
| Haim Corfu | Likud | |
| Sarah Doron | Likud | |
| Michael Eitan | Likud | |
| Ovadia Eli | Likud | |
| Gideon Gadot | Likud | |
| Yosef Goldberg | Likud | Left party to establish the New Liberal Party, but later returned to Likud |
| Pinchas Goldstein | Likud | Left party to establish the New Liberal Party |
| Pesach Grupper | Likud | Left party to establish the New Liberal Party |
| Tzachi Hanegbi | Likud | |
| Yigal Hurvitz | Likud | |
| Moshe Katsav | Likud | |
| Uzi Landau | Likud | |
| David Levy | Likud | |
| Uriel Lynn | Likud | |
| David Magen | Likud | |
| Joshua Matza | Likud | |
| Dan Meridor | Likud | |
| Roni Milo | Likud | |
| Yitzhak Moda'i | Likud | Left party to establish the New Liberal Party |
| Benjamin Netanyahu | Likud | |
| Moshe Nissim | Likud | |
| Ehud Olmert | Likud | |
| Gideon Patt | Likud | |
| Yehuda Perah | Likud | |
| Reuven Rivlin | Likud | |
| Yehoshua Saguy | Likud | |
| Ya'akov Shamai | Likud | |
| Yitzhak Shamir | Likud | |
| Avraham Sharir | Likud | Left party to establish the New Liberal Party, but later returned to Likud |
| Ariel Sharon | Likud | |
| Dov Shilansky | Likud | |
| Zalman Shoval | Likud | |
| Dan Tichon | Likud | |
| Ariel Weinstein | Likud | |
| Nava Arad | Alignment | Faction dissolved and renamed Labor Party |
| Shoshana Arbeli-Almozlino | Alignment | Faction dissolved and renamed Labor Party |
| Haim Bar-Lev | Alignment | Faction dissolved and renamed Labor Party |
| Michael Bar-Zohar | Alignment | Faction dissolved and renamed Labor Party |
| Uzi Baram | Alignment | Faction dissolved and renamed Labor Party |
| Yossi Beilin | Alignment | Faction dissolved and renamed Labor Party |
| Binyamin Ben-Eliezer | Alignment | Faction dissolved and renamed Labor Party |
| Eli Ben-Menachem | Alignment | Faction dissolved and renamed Labor Party |
| Avraham Burg | Alignment | Faction dissolved and renamed Labor Party |
| Ra'anan Cohen | Alignment | Faction dissolved and renamed Labor Party |
| Eli Dayan | Alignment | Faction dissolved and renamed Labor Party |
| Rafael Edri | Alignment | Faction dissolved and renamed Labor Party |
| Aryeh Eliav | Alignment | Faction dissolved and renamed Labor Party |
| Gedalia Gal | Alignment | Faction dissolved and renamed Labor Party |
| Micha Goldman | Alignment | Faction dissolved and renamed Labor Party |
| Efraim Gur | Alignment | Left party to establish the Unity for Peace and Immigration, which merged into Likud |
| Mordechai Gur | Alignment | Faction dissolved and renamed Labor Party |
| Michael Harish | Alignment | Faction dissolved and renamed Labor Party |
| Shlomo Hillel | Alignment | Faction dissolved and renamed Labor Party |
| Avraham Katz-Oz | Alignment | Faction dissolved and renamed Labor Party |
| Israel Kessar | Alignment | Faction dissolved and renamed Labor Party |
| David Libai | Alignment | Faction dissolved and renamed Labor Party |
| Nawaf Massalha | Alignment | Faction dissolved and renamed Labor Party |
| Hagai Meirom | Alignment | Faction dissolved and renamed Labor Party |
| Ora Namir | Alignment | Faction dissolved and renamed Labor Party |
| Yitzhak Navon | Alignment | Faction dissolved and renamed Labor Party |
| Shimon Peres | Alignment | Faction dissolved and renamed Labor Party |
| Amir Peretz | Alignment | Faction dissolved and renamed Labor Party |
| Yitzhak Rabin | Alignment | Faction dissolved and renamed Labor Party |
| Haim Ramon | Alignment | Faction dissolved and renamed Labor Party |
| Moshe Shahal | Alignment | Faction dissolved and renamed Labor Party |
| Shimon Shetreet | Alignment | Faction dissolved and renamed Labor Party |
| Avraham Shochat | Alignment | Faction dissolved and renamed Labor Party |
| Edna Solodar | Alignment | Faction dissolved and renamed Labor Party |
| Ya'akov Tzur | Alignment | Faction dissolved and renamed Labor Party |
| Shevah Weiss | Alignment | Faction dissolved and renamed Labor Party |
| Ezer Weizman | Alignment | Faction dissolved and renamed Labor Party |
| Gad Yaacobi | Alignment | Faction dissolved and renamed Labor Party |
| Emanuel Zisman | Alignment | Faction dissolved and renamed Labor Party |
| Yosef Azran | Shas | |
| Shlomo Dayan | Shas | |
| Aryeh Gamliel | Shas | |
| Yair Levy | Shas | |
| Yitzhak Peretz | Shas | Left party to establish Moria |
| Rafael Pinhasi | Shas | |
| Moshe Ze'ev Feldman | Agudat Yisrael | |
| Shmuel Halpert | Agudat Yisrael | |
| Eliezer Mizrahi | Agudat Yisrael | Left party to establish Geulat Yisrael |
| Menachem Porush | Agudat Yisrael | |
| Avraham Verdiger | Agudat Yisrael | |
| Shulamit Aloni | Ratz | Party merged into Meretz |
| Ran Cohen | Ratz | Party merged into Meretz |
| Yossi Sarid | Ratz | Party merged into Meretz |
| Mordechai Virshubski | Ratz | Party merged into Meretz |
| David Zucker | Ratz | Party merged into Meretz |
| Yigal Bibi | National Religious Party | |
| Zevulun Hammer | National Religious Party | |
| Yitzhak Levy | National Religious Party | |
| Hanan Porat | National Religious Party | |
| Avner Shaki | National Religious Party | |
| Charlie Biton | Hadash | Left party to sit as an independent, before establishing the Black Panthers |
| Tawfik Toubi | Hadash | |
| Meir Vilner | Hadash | |
| Tawfiq Ziad | Hadash | |
| Geula Cohen | Tehiya | |
| Yuval Ne'eman | Tehiya | |
| Eliezer Waldman | Tehiya | |
| Hussein Faris | Mapam | Party merged into Meretz |
| Haim Oron | Mapam | Party merged into Meretz |
| Yair Tzaban | Mapam | Party merged into Meretz |
| Rafael Eitan | Tzomet | |
| Yoash Tzidon | Tzomet | |
| Yair Sprinzak | Moledet | |
| Rehavam Ze'evi | Moledet | |
| Avraham Poraz | Shinui | Party merged into Meretz |
| Amnon Rubinstein | Shinui | Party merged into Meretz |
| Moshe Gafni | Degel HaTorah | |
| Avraham Ravitz | Degel HaTorah | |
| Mohammed Miari | Progressive List for Peace | |
| Abdulwahab Darawshe | Arab Democratic Party | |

=== Replacements ===
| MK | Replaced | Date | Party | Notes |
|---|---|---|---|---|
| Michael Kleiner | Yigal Cohen | 6 December 1988 | Likud | |
| Hashem Mahameed | Meir Vilner | 10 January 1990 | Hadash | |
| Gershon Shafat | Yuval Ne'eman | 30 January 1990 | Tehiya | |
| Elyakim Haetzni | Eliezer Waldman | 31 January 1990 | Tehiya | |
| Mohamed Nafa | Tawfiq Ziad | 14 February 1990 | Hadash | |
| Tamar Gozansky | Tawfik Toubi | 4 July 1990 | Hadash | |
| Haim Kaufman | Zalman Shoval | 8 October 1990 | Likud | |
| Salah Tarif | Ezer Weizman | 3 February 1992 | Labor Party | |
| Limor Livnat | Haim Corfu | 14 April 1992 | Likud | |
