= Twenty-fourth government of Israel =

1990–92 government led by Yitzhak Shamir

Fourth Shamir Cabinet
- 24th Cabinet of Israel

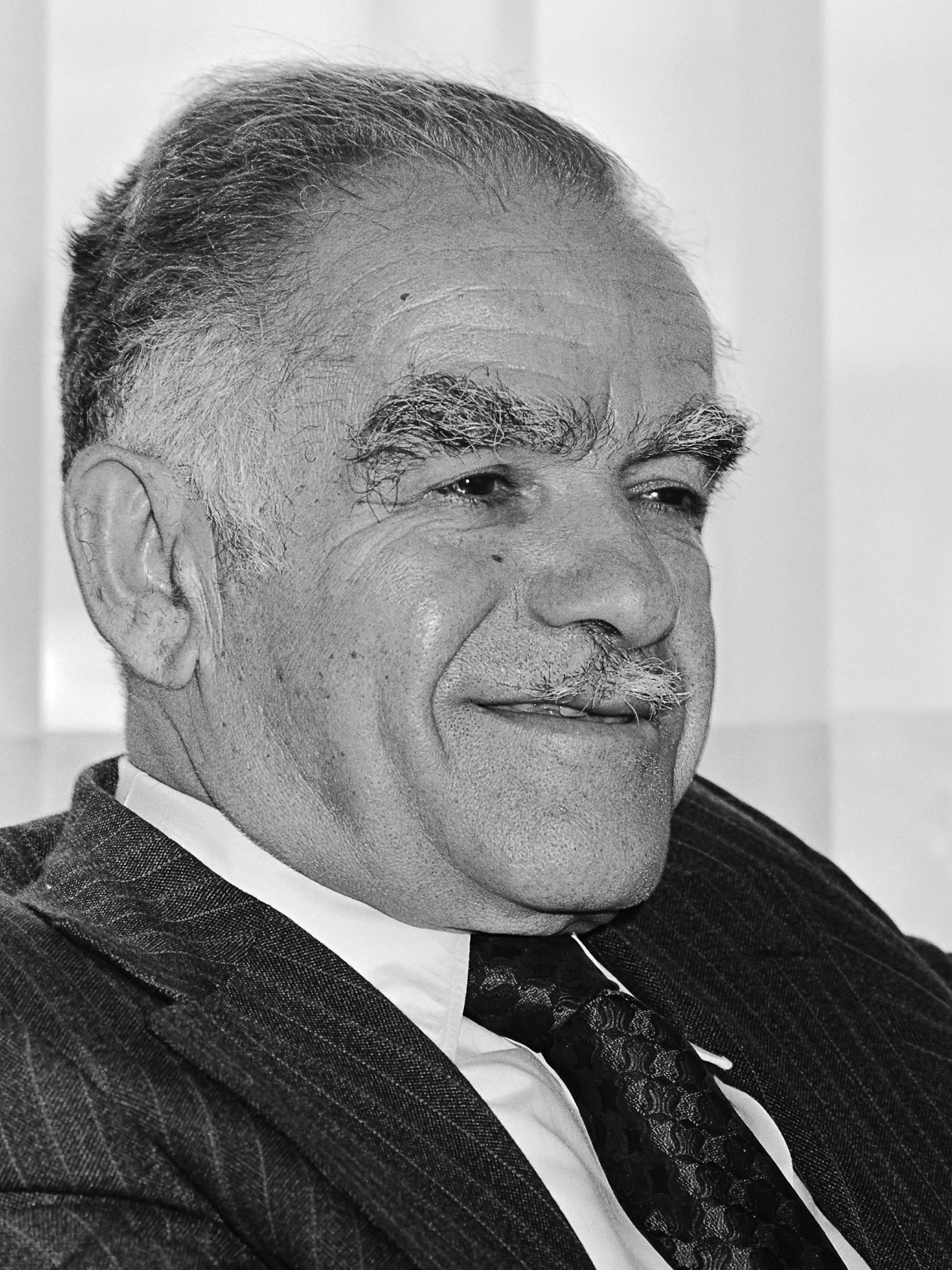
- Date established: 11 June 1990
- Date dissolved: 13 July 1992

Leadership and composition
- Head of state: Chaim Herzog
- Head of government: Yitzhak Shamir
- Member parties: Likud; Tzomet (until 31 December 1991); Shas; National Religious Party; Moledet (until 21 January 1992); Agudat Yisrael; Unity for Peace and Immigration; New Liberal Party; Geulat Yisrael; Degel HaTorah; Tehiya (until 21 January 1992); Alignment (one person)
- Status in legislature: Right-wing Coalition
- Opposition party: Labor
- Opposition leader: Shimon Peres

Formation and history
- Legislature term: 12th Knesset
- Predecessor: 23rd Cabinet of Israel
- Successor: 25th Cabinet of Israel

The twenty-fourth government of Israel was formed by Yitzhak Shamir of Likud on 11 June 1990. This followed the failure of Alignment leader Shimon Peres to form a government, after the Alignment had pulled out of the previous national unity coalition, in an incident which became known as the dirty trick.

Shamir's coalition included Likud, the National Religious Party, Shas, Agudat Yisrael, Degel HaTorah, the New Liberal Party, Tehiya, Tzomet, Moledet, Unity for Peace and Immigration and Geulat Yisrael, and held 62 of the 120 seats in the Knesset. Between the 1990s to the 2010s, some authors (including political scientist Clive A. Jones and historians Avi Shlaim and Benny Morris) later asserted that the 24th government of Israel was the most right-wing government in the country's history, a record that was since surpassed by the 37th government in 2022. Tehiya, Tzomet and Moledet all left the coalition in late 1991 and early 1992 in protest at Shamir's participation in the Madrid Conference, but the government remained in office until Yitzhak Rabin formed the twenty-fifth government, following the Labor Party's victory in the 1992 elections.

Israeli government formation, 1990
- 11 June 1990
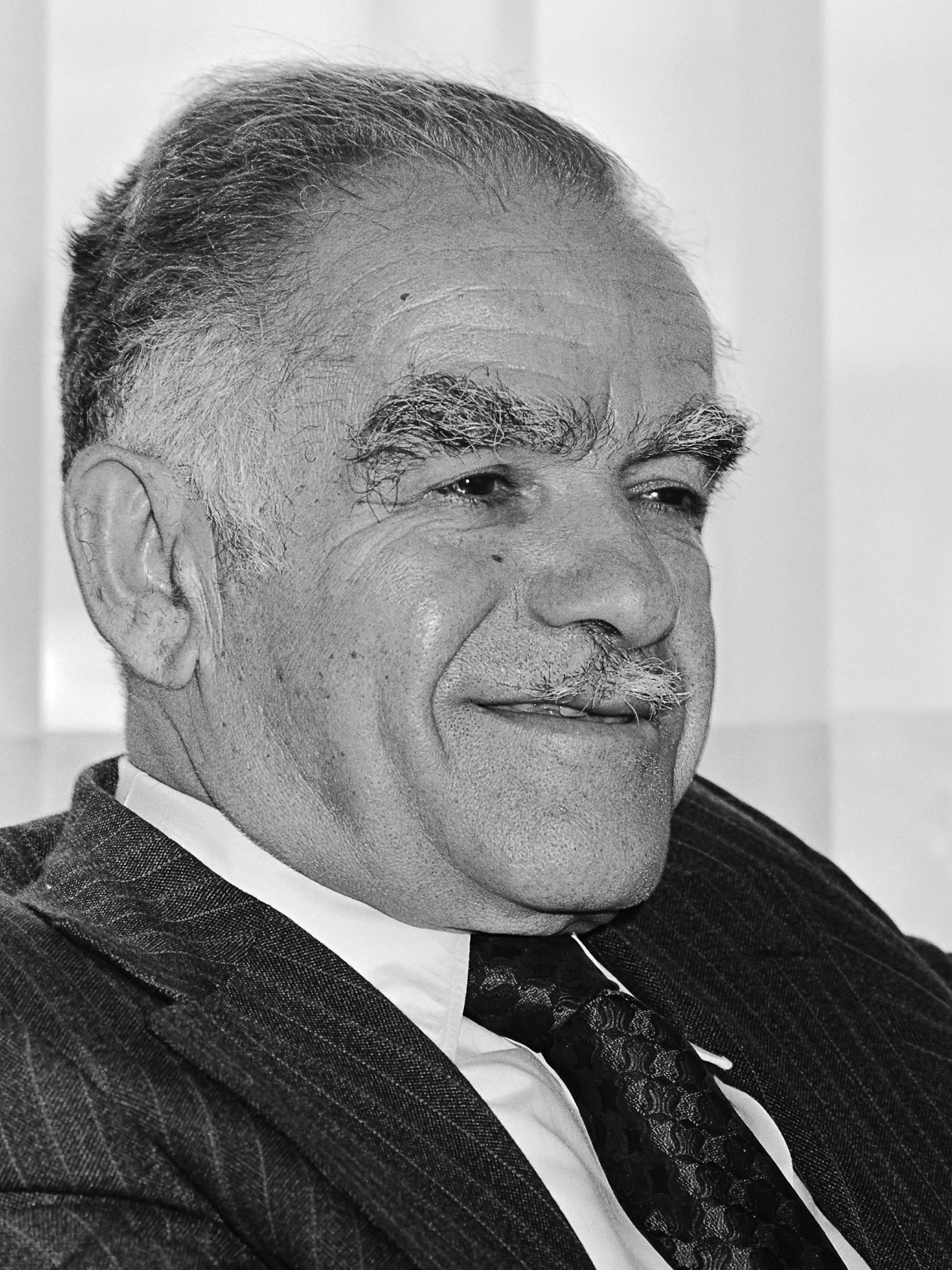

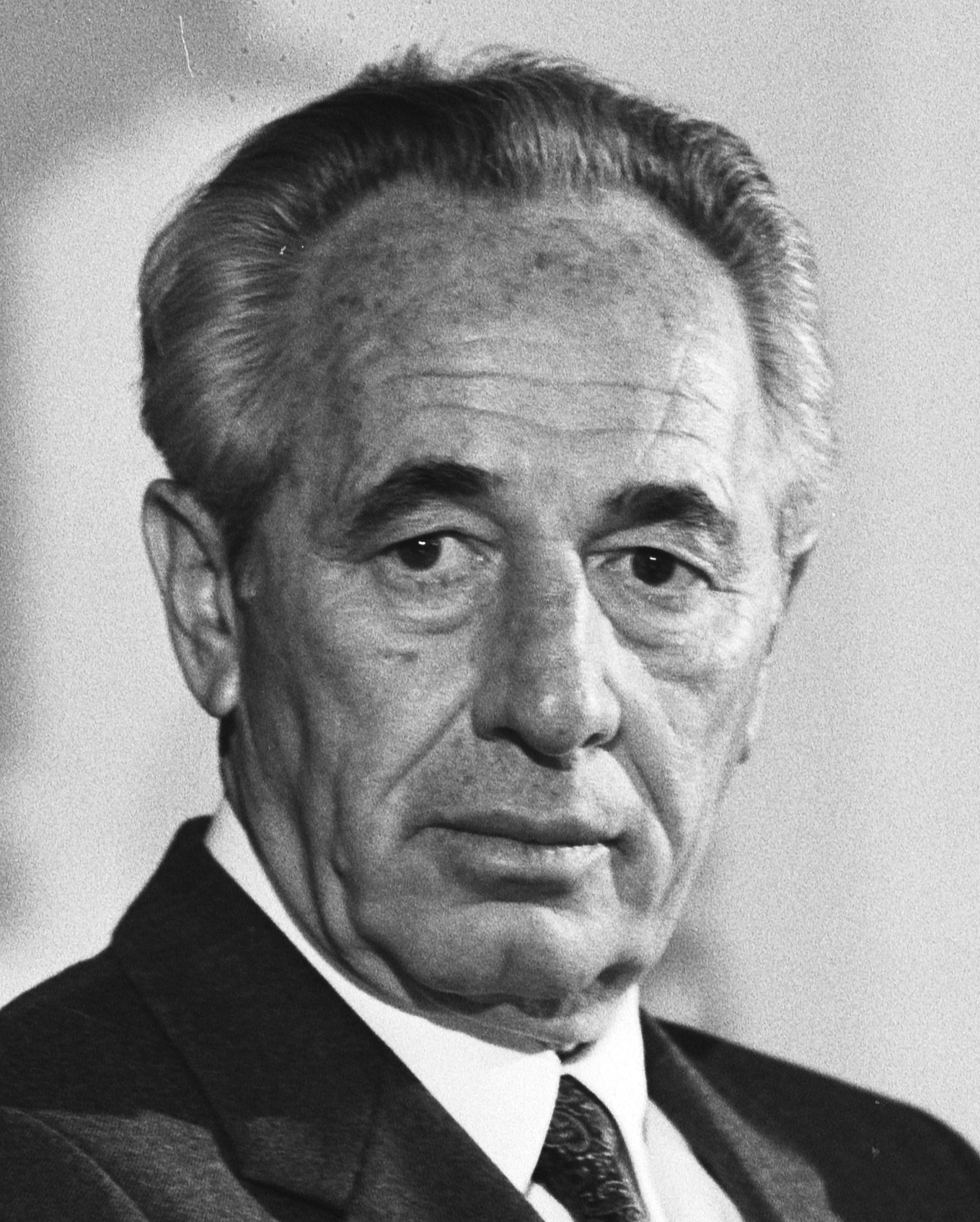
Nominee	Yitzhak Shamir	Shimon Peres
Party	Likud	Labor
Electoral vote	62	58
Percentage	51.6%	48.3%
Prime Minister before election
Yitzhak Shamir
Likud
Elected Prime Minister
Yitzhak Shamir
Likud

== Cabinet members ==
Position	Person	Party
Prime Minister	Yitzhak Shamir	Likud
Deputy Prime Minister	David Levy	Likud
Deputy Prime Minister	Moshe Nissim	Likud
Minister of Agriculture	Rafael Eitan (until 31 December 1991)	Tzomet
Minister of Communications	Rafael Pinhasi	Shas
Minister of Defense	Moshe Arens	Likud
Minister of Economics and Planning	David Magen	Likud
Minister of Education and Culture	Zevulun Hammer	National Religious Party
Minister of Energy and Infrastructure	Yuval Ne'eman (until 21 January 1992)	Not an MK ^{1}
Minister of the Environment	Yitzhak Shamir	Likud
Minister of Finance	Yitzhak Moda'i	Likud
Minister of Foreign Affairs	David Levy	Likud
Minister of Health	Ehud Olmert	Likud
Minister of Housing and Construction	Ariel Sharon	Likud
Minister of Immigrant Absorption	Yitzhak Peretz	Shas
Minister of Industry and Trade	Moshe Nissim	Likud
Minister of Internal Affairs	Aryeh Deri	Not an MK ^{2}
Minister of Jerusalem Affairs	Yitzhak Shamir (from 27 November 1990)	Likud
Minister of Justice	Dan Meridor	Likud
Minister of Labour and Social Welfare	Yitzhak Shamir	Likud
Minister of Police	Roni Milo	Likud
Minister of Religious Affairs	Avner Shaki	National Religious Party
Minister of Science and Development	Yuval Ne'eman (until 21 January 1990)	Not an MK ^{1}
Minister of Tourism	Gideon Patt	Likud
Minister of Transportation	Moshe Katsav	Likud
Minister without Portfolio	Rehavam Ze'evi (5 February 1991 - 12 January 1992)	Moledet
Deputy Minister in the Prime Minister's Office	Yigal Bibi (2 August - 20 November 1990)	National Religious Party
Deputy Minister in the Prime Minister's Office	Shmuel Halpert (19 November 1990 - 8 June 1991)	Agudat Yisrael
Deputy Minister in the Prime Minister's Office	Benjamin Netanyahu (from 11 November 1991)	Likud
Deputy Minister of Communications	Efraim Gur (2 July - 20 November 1990)	Unity for Peace and Immigration
Deputy Minister of Defense	Ovadia Eli	Likud
Deputy Minister of Education and Culture	Pinchas Goldstein (from 20 November 1990)	New Liberal Party
Deputy Minister of the Environment	Yigal Bibi (from 20 November 1990)	National Religious Party
Deputy Minister of Finance	Yosef Azran (from 2 July 1990)	Alignment
Deputy Minister of Foreign Affairs	Benjamin Netanyahu (until 11 November 1991)	Likud
Deputy Minister of Health	Eliezer Mizrahi	Agudat Yisrael, Geulat Yisrael
Deputy Minister of Housing and Construction	Avraham Ravitz	Agudat Yisrael
Deputy Minister of Jerusalem Affairs	Avraham Verdiger (from 27 November 1990)	Agudat Yisrael
Deputy Minister of Labour and Social Welfare	Menachem Porush (from 19 November 1990)	Agudat Yisrael
Deputy Minister of Labour and Social Welfare	Shmuel Halpert (from 8 June 1991)	Agudat Yisrael
Deputy Minister of Religious Affairs	Moshe Gafni (from 23 July 1990)	Degel HaTorah
Deputy Minister of Science and Technology	Geula Cohen (until 31 October 1991)	Tehiya
Deputy Minister of Transportation	Pinchas Goldstein (2 July - 20 November 1990)	New Liberal Party

^{1} Although Ne'eman was not a Knesset member at the time, he was a member of Tehiya.

^{2} Although Deri was not a Knesset member at the time, he was a member of Shas.
