= Gennady Riger =

Israeli politician (1948–2015)

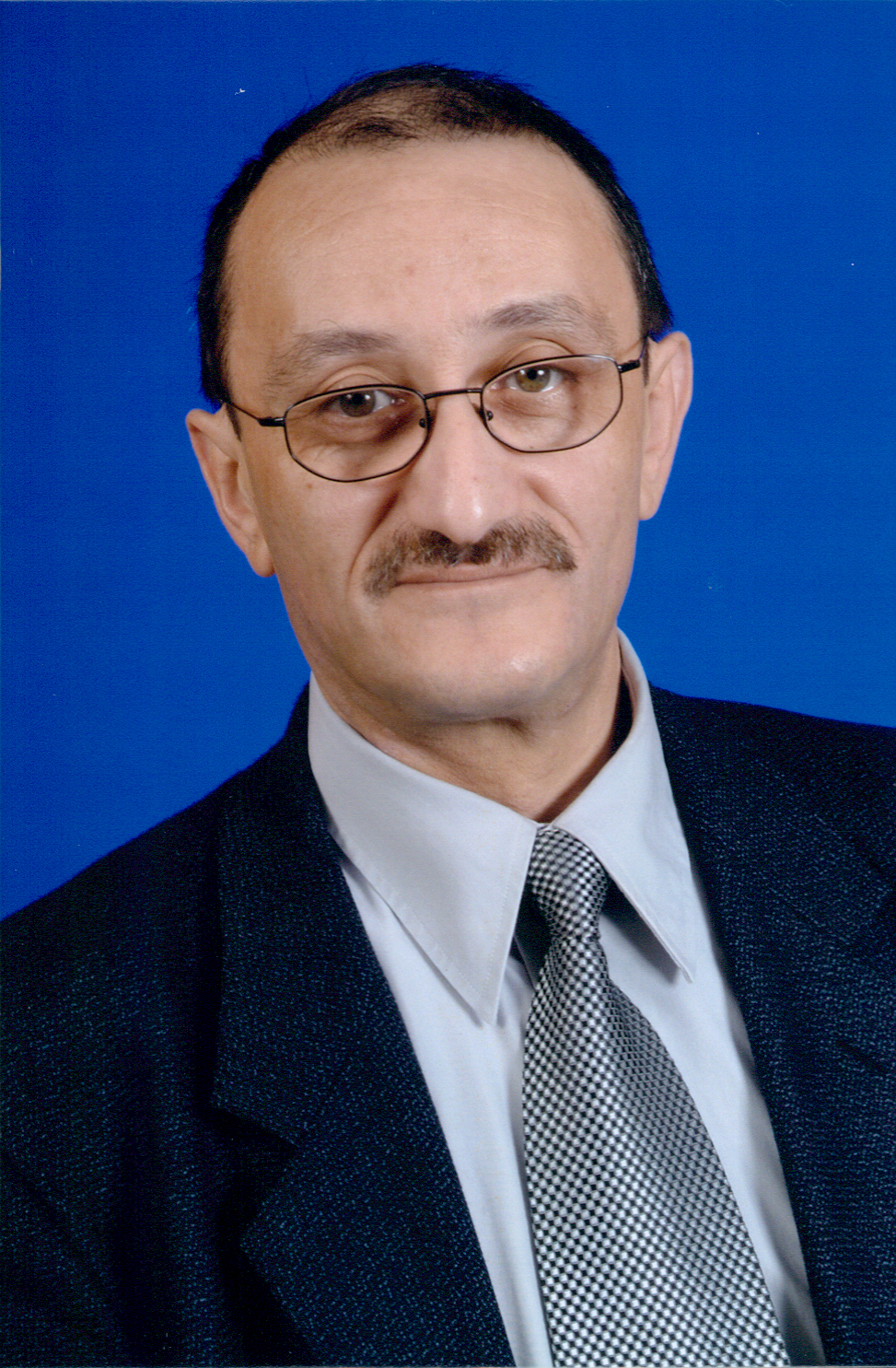
- Riger during his time in the Knesset

Faction represented in the Knesset
- 1999–2003: Yisrael BaAliyah

Personal details
- Born: 24 May 1948 Soviet Union
- Died: 12 October 2015 (aged 67) Kfar Saba, Israel

Gennady Riger (Hebrew: גנדי ריגר; 24 May 1948 – 12 October 2015) was an Israeli politician who served as a member of the Knesset for Yisrael BaAliyah between 1999 and 2003.

== Biography ==
Born in the Soviet Union, Riger studied mechanical engineering at Lviv University, obtaining a second degree. He worked as an engineer before emigrating to Israel in 1990.

In 1992 he was involved in founding the Da party, which was dominated by immigrants from the former Soviet Union. In 1996 he became general secretary of another immigrant party, Yisrael BaAliyah. He was placed fifth on the Yisrael BaAliyah list for the 1999 elections, and entered the Knesset as the party won six seats.

He was placed fourth on the list for the 2003 elections, but lost his seat as the party was reduced to just 2 MKs. He later founded a political consulting firm, Politeck.

A father of one, Riger was married and lived in Kfar Saba.
