= The dirty trick =

Israeli political scandal

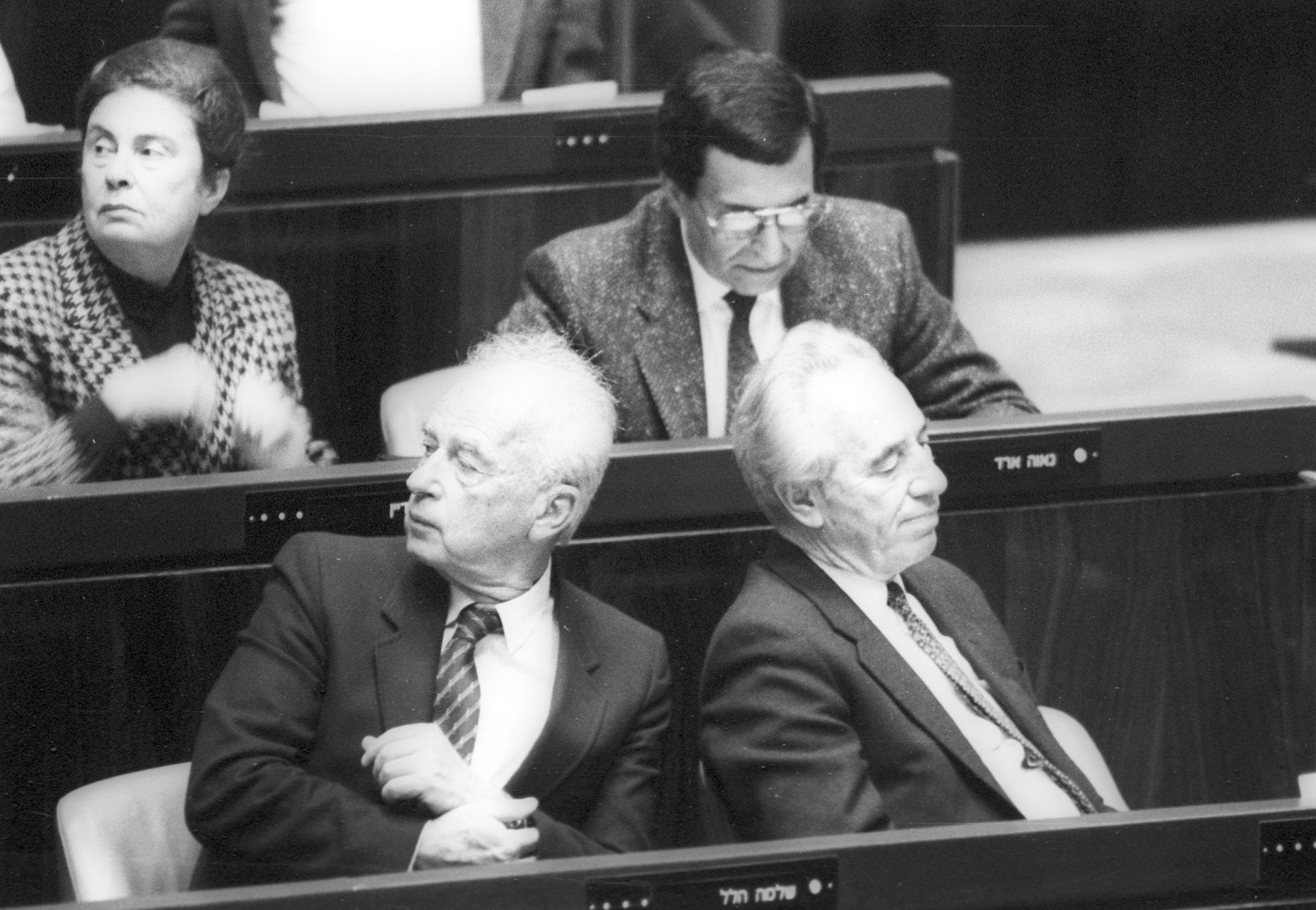
Yitzhak Rabin and Shimon Peres listening to the speeches of the PM and ministers.

The dirty trick (Hebrew: התרגיל המסריח, romanized: HaTargil HaMasriaḥ, lit. 'The stinking trick') was a political scandal that occurred in Israel in 1990. It referred to an attempt by Shimon Peres to form a government made up of the left-wing factions and the ultra-orthodox parties. It failed when the ultra-orthodox parties backed out on the deal.

== Background ==
Peres' Israeli Labor Party had been part of the second national unity government with its traditional rival, Yitzhak Shamir's Likud, since 1988. Shamir had served as prime minister, while Peres served as finance minister. In early 1990, the United States Secretary of State James Baker suggested that Israel negotiate with a Palestinian delegation consisting of Palestinians deported from the Israeli occupied territories as well as some from East Jerusalem. Peres demanded that the government accept Baker's proposal. Shamir balked, under pressure from hardliners in his own party. Peres gave Shamir an ultimatum, threatening to tear up the coalition agreement if Shamir did not accept the Baker plan.

== The move ==
Peres drafted a secret agreement with Aryeh Deri and Shas to support the dissolution of the national unity government. The Alignment then issued a motion of no confidence against the government. Shamir promptly sacked Peres, and the other Alignment ministers resigned as well. On 15 March, the government was dissolved by a vote of 60 to 55. Agudat Yisrael voted for the motion, while Shas abstained. It was the only time in Israeli history that a government was dissolved by a motion of no confidence.

After the government fell, President Chaim Herzog chose Peres to form the new government. Peres soon found this task difficult. Speaking in a rally at the Yad Eliyahu Arena, Rabbi Elazar Shach, Degel HaTorah's spiritual leader, called on his public not to tolerate a coalition with the secular, Kashrut-violating left, "eaters of hares and swine". This later became known as "The hares address". Following Rabbi Shach's firm objection, Shas mentor Rabbi Ovadia Yosef also refused to allow Shas to serve under Peres. Peres was thus left with the support of 60 MKs, one short of a majority. The extra MK would be Avraham Sharir, who had left the Likud in February to form the New Liberal Party.

The new government was to be approved on 11 April. However, on that morning two Agudat Yisrael MKs, Eliezer Mizrahi and Avraham Verdiger, were absent due to the Lubavitcher Rebbe Menachem Mendel Schneerson refusing to support any concession of Israeli territory. It later turned out that Mizrahi was not even present at the signing of the agreement between the Alignment and Agudat Yisrael, while Verdiger had only pretended to sign it, and in fact had just waved his pen over the paper.

Peres asked Herzog for an extension, but had to surrender his mandate on 26 April. Herzog then invited Shamir to form a government. Shamir managed to form a right-wing coalition. Sharir returned to the Likud following Shamir's memorable cry, "Abrasha, come back home!", and Efraim Gur, who left the Alignment, also joined. Shamir presented his new government on 11 June.

== Aftermath ==
Yitzhak Rabin named the affair "the dirty trick" in an interview, saying "All this bluff and corruptibility which came into the Israeli political life in an attempt to form a narrow government failed not only tactically but also conceptually". Despite the incident, Peres avoided an immediate leadership election within the Labor Party, although he lost the contest to Rabin prior to the 1992 elections.

During the affair, potential coalition members publicly demanded inducements, including a $2.5 million bank bond, $111 million in subsidies for private religious schools, and guaranteed seats in the Knesset. This prompted protests by the Israeli public, including rallies and hunger strikes. It was in one of the rallies in Kings of Israel Square that the call "Mush'hatim, nim'astem!" ("We're fed up with you corrupt people!") was first uttered. It was later adopted by the Labor Party in its 1992 elections campaign (when it was led by Rabin), and is considered to have been instrumental to its victory.

The affair also led to an electoral reform and a direct elections format for the position of prime minister.

== See also ==
- Haredim and Zionism
- Unholy alliance (geopolitical)
