= Unity for Peace and Immigration =

Unity for Peace and Immigration אחדות למען השלום והעלייה
- Leader: Efraim Gur
- Founder: Efraim Gur
- Founded: 25 December 1990
- Split from: Alignment
- Merged into: Likud
- Most MKs: 1 (1990)

Unity for Peace and Immigration (Hebrew: אחדות למען השלום והעלייה, Ahdut LeMa'an HaShalom VeHaAliya) was a short-lived one man political faction in Israel in the early 1990s.

== Background ==
The faction was formed on 25 December 1990 when Efraim Gur broke away from the Alignment in 1990, during the term of the twelfth Knesset. Gur was invited to join Yitzhak Shamir's new government, which had been formed (minus the Alignment) on 11 June 1990, and accepted. He was initially appointed Deputy Minister of Communications, but became Deputy Minister of Transportation in November 1990.

Towards the end of the Knesset term, Gur merged his faction into Likud on 17 May 1992. Gur retained his seat in the 1992 elections on Likud's list, but broke away from his new party in March 1996 and saw out the remainder of his term as an independent. He formed a new party under the name Unity for New Immigrants (Hebrew: אחדות למען העלייה בראשות אפרים גור) which ran in the 1996 elections but failed to cross the electoral threshold and subsequently disappeared.
