= Ya'akov Mizrahi =

Israeli politician

Faction represented in the Knesset
- 1972–1974: Agudat Yisrael

Personal details
- Born: 1919 Rehovot, Palestine
- Died: 13 August 1980 (aged 60–61) Be'er Ya'akov, Israel

Ya'akov Mizrahi (Hebrew: יעקב מזרחי; 1919 – 13 August 1980) was an Israeli politician who served as a member of the Knesset for Agudat Yisrael between 1972 and 1974.

== Biography ==
Mizrachi was born in Rehovot in 1919 to a family who had emigrated from Yemen. He was on the Agudat Yisrael list for the 1969 elections, and although he failed to win a seat, he entered the Knesset on 27 November 1972 as a replacement for Shlomo-Ya'akov Gross, who had resigned his seat as part of a rotation agreement. He was a member of Internal Affairs Committee until losing his seat in the 1973 elections. Earlier in the year one of his sons, David, had died during the Yom Kippur War. His other son Eliezer later also became a member of the Knesset for Agudat Yisrael.

In 1980 he suffered a heart attack while travelling to Jerusalem. After being found unconscious next to his car, he was taken to Assaf Harofeh Medical Center in Be'er Ya'akov, where he died.
