= Yoram Lass =

Israeli physician and politician

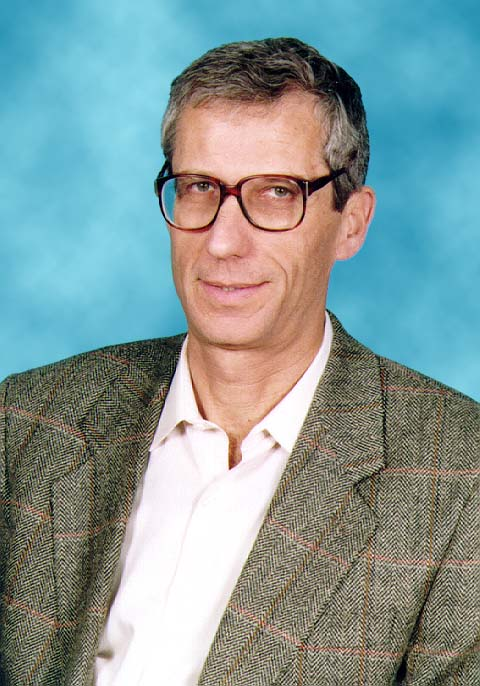
- Lass in the 1990

Faction represented in the Knesset
- 1992–1996: Labor Party

Personal details
- Born: 30 January 1945 (age 81) Mandatory Palestine

Yoram Lass (Hebrew: יוֹרָם לַס; born 30 January 1945) is an Israeli physician, researcher, scientist, and former politician. He served as Director-General of the Ministry of Health and was a member of the Knesset for the Labor Party between 1992 and 1996.

== Biography ==
Born towards the end of the Mandate era, Lass earned a doctorate in medicine at the Hebrew University of Jerusalem. He worked as a lecturer, and became Associate Dean of the Tel Aviv University Medical School. During the 1980s he presented the science-based television show Tatzpit with Yael Dan. He later became Director-General of the Health Ministry.

A member of the Labor Party, he was elected to the Knesset on its list in 1992. He chaired the Health Subcommittee. After leaving politics he returned to teaching at Tel Aviv University.

In 2011 founded N-UFiltration, a company dedicated to recycling of hemodialisers for various industrial and agricultural usages, as well as for providing affordable drinking water.

During the COVID-19 pandemic, Lass opposed the lockdown policy adopted by the government, arguing that "I'm going to say something that's really hard to hear. For the sake of a few people who anyways don't have a long life expectancy, you don't ruin a country. You don't ruin the world. You sacrifice."
