= Gideon Sagi =

Israeli politician

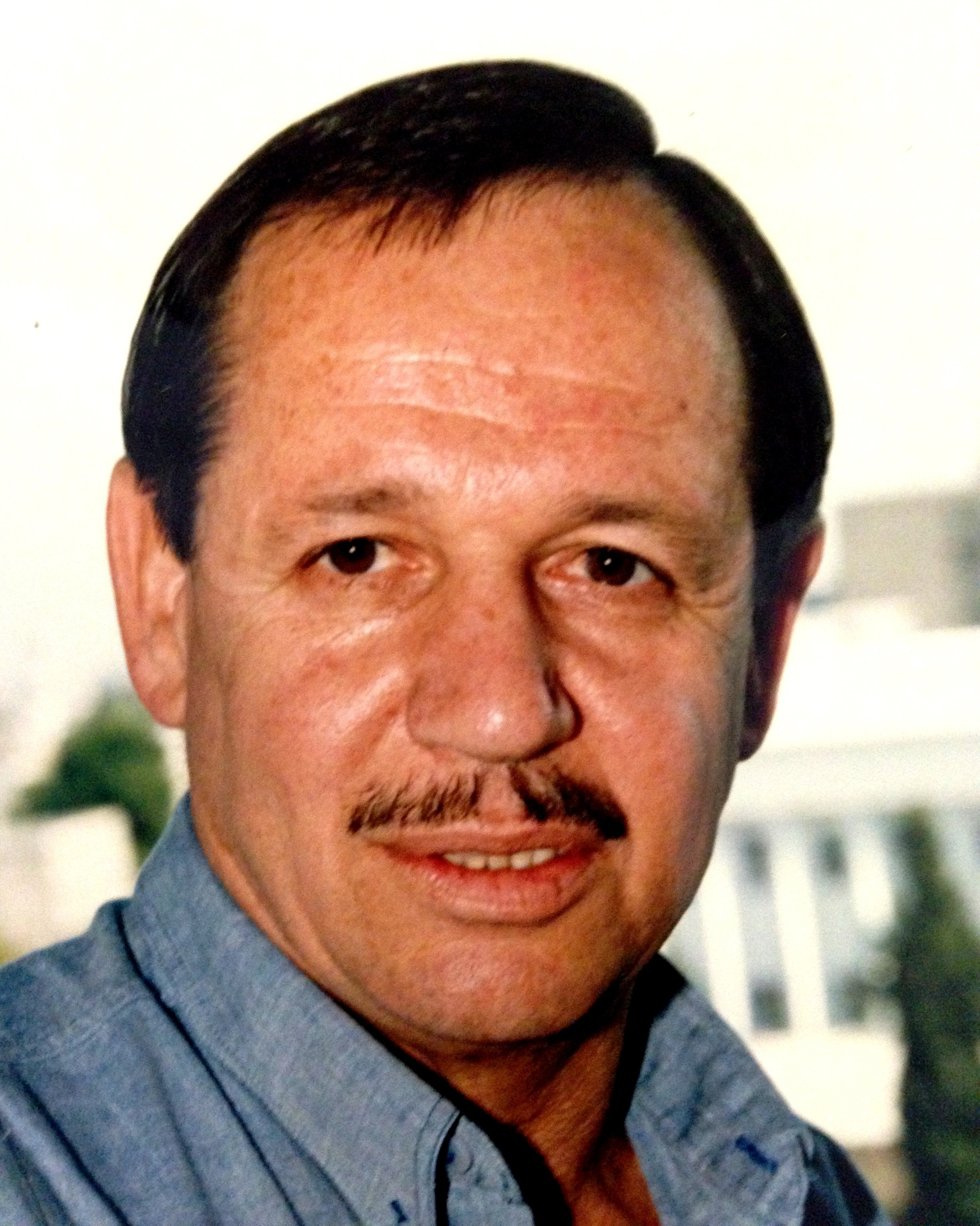
- Sagi in the 1990s

Faction represented in the Knesset
- 1992–1996: Labor Party

Personal details
- Born: 17 August 1939 (age 85); Petah Tikva, Mandatory Palestine

Gideon Sagi (Hebrew: גדעון שגיא; born 17 August 1939) is an Israeli former politician who served as a member of the Knesset for the Labor Party between 1992 and 1996.

== Biography ==
Born in Petah Tikva during the Mandate period, Sagi received a BA from the Hebrew University of Jerusalem, and worked in administration. He was a member of the Histadrut trade union's central committee, and headed the Workers Organisations and Manpower and Administrations departments.

A member of the Labor Party central committee, he was elected to the Knesset on the party's list in 1992. He was a member of several committees, and chaired the Subcommittee for Insurance, before losing his seat in the 1996 elections.
