= Yehuda Perah =

Israeli politician (1924–1998)

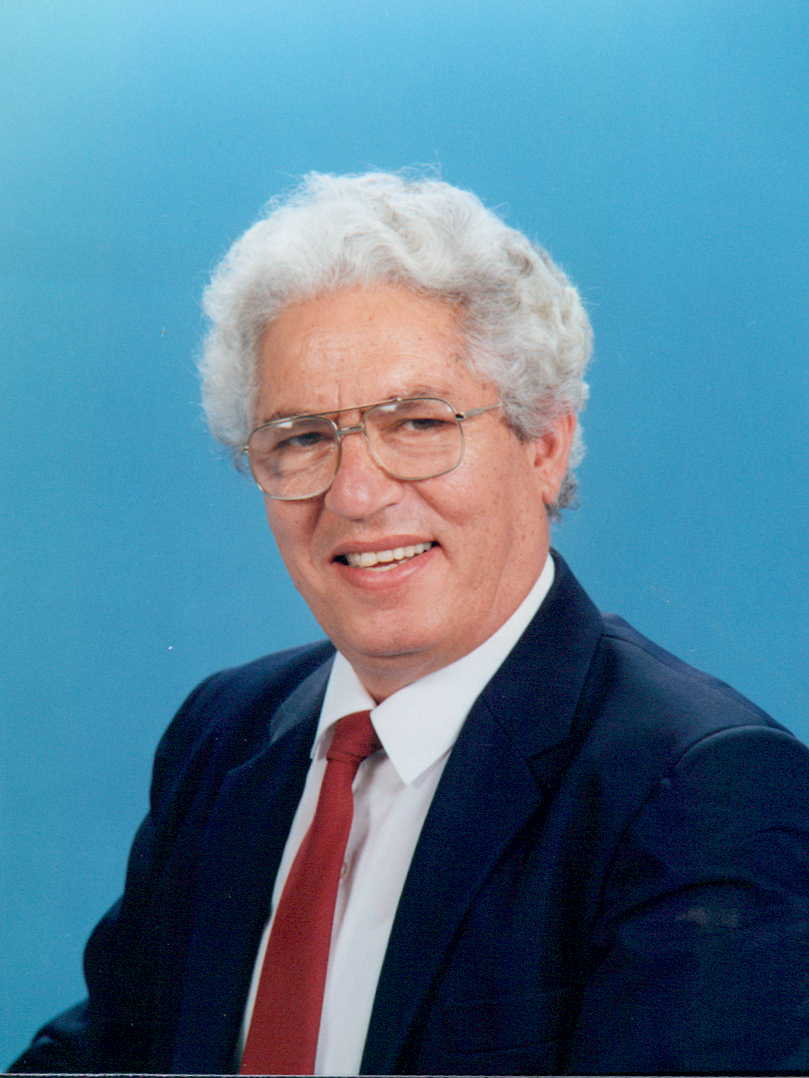

Faction represented in the Knesset
- 1981–1984: Likud
- 1988–1992: Likud

Personal details
- Born: 11 January 1924 Jerusalem, Mandatory Palestine
- Died: 6 November 1998 (aged 74)

Yehuda Perah (Hebrew: יהודה פרח; 11 January 1924 – 6 November 1998) was an Israeli educator and politician who served as a member of the Knesset for Likud between 1981 and 1984, and again from 1988 until 1992.

== Biography ==
Born in Jerusalem during the Mandate era, Perah was educated at the Kadoorie Agricultural High School. He went on to study at the Teachers Seminary in Jerusalem, and was later awarded a Ph.D. in literature and education by Tel Aviv University. In 1976 he became head of the Centre of Technology for Education and a senior lecturer at the university. Between 1976 and 1982 he also worked as a supervisor in the Central District for the Ministry of Education.

In 1974 he joined the Liberal Party. He became chairman of the party's Netanya branch, and a member of its central committee. He was elected to the Knesset on the Likud list (then an alliance of the Liberal Party, Herut and other right-wing factions) in 1981. In 1983 he was one of five Liberal Party MKs who formed a hawkish faction led by Yitzhak Modai. He lost his seat in the 1984 elections, and became general manager of the Central School for Tourism the following year. He returned to the Knesset following the 1988 elections, but lost his seat again in 1992 after being placed forty-seventh on the Likud list, but the party won only 32 seats.

He died in 1998 at the age of 74.
