= Ya'akov Shefi =

Israeli politician

- יעקב שפי
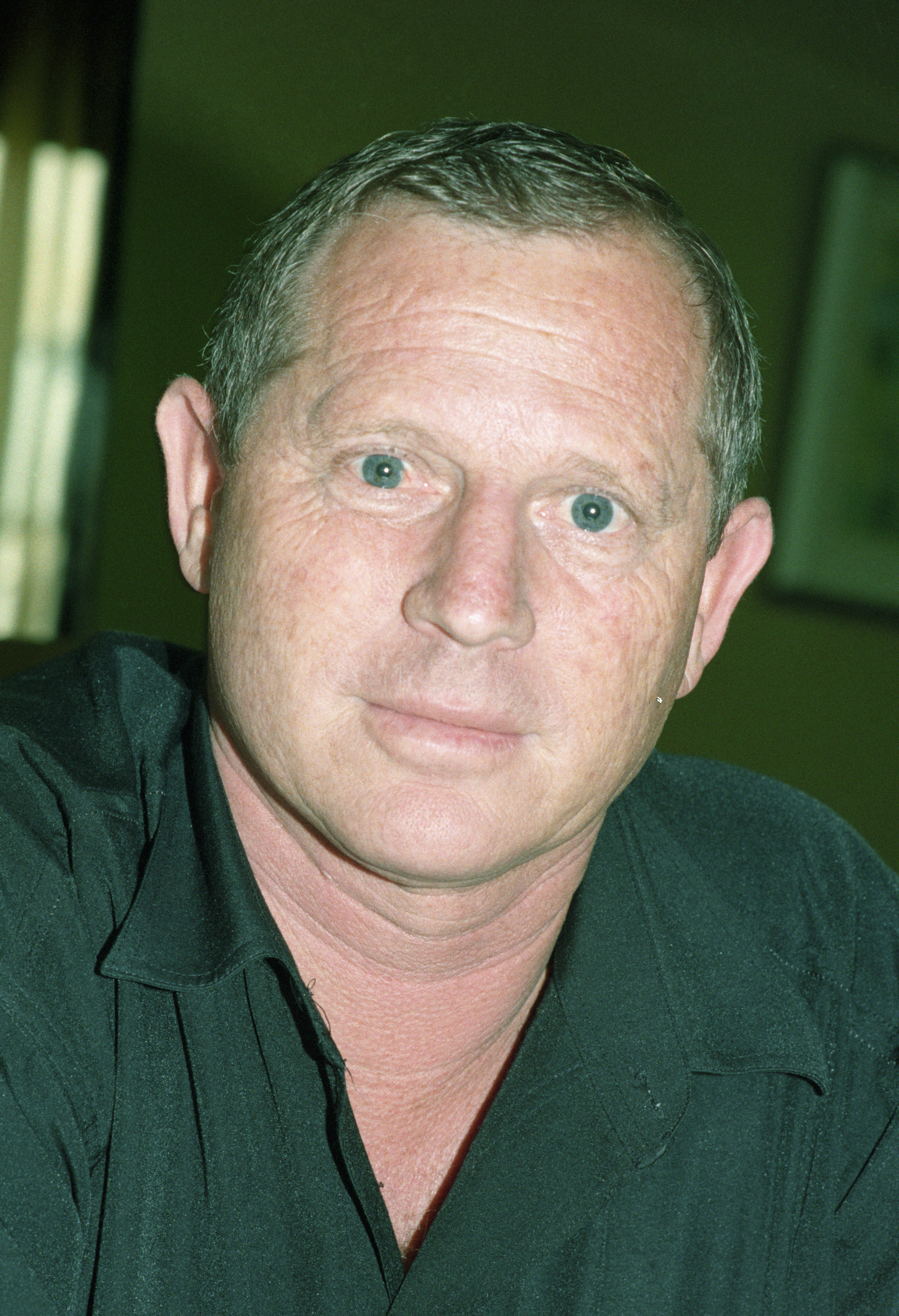
- Shefi in 1992

Faction represented in the Knesset
- 1992–1996: Labor Party

Personal details
- Born: 25 January 1941 (age 84); Petah Tikva, Mandatory Palestine

Ya'akov Shefi (Hebrew: יעקב שפי; born 25 January 1941) is an Israeli former politician who served as a member of the Knesset for the Labor Party from 1992 until 1996.

== Biography ==
Born in Petah Tikva during the Mandate period, Shefi was educated at the Israeli Air Force's technical school. He worked as an administrator, and was a member of the Petah Tikva Workers Council and the central committee of the Histadrut trade union. He was also a member of the board at Hapoel Petah Tikva and of the Israel Football Association's administration.

A member of the Labor Party, he was elected to the Knesset on the party's list in 1992. He was a member of several committees until losing his seat in the 1996 elections.
