= Gedalia Gal =

Israeli politician (born 1933)

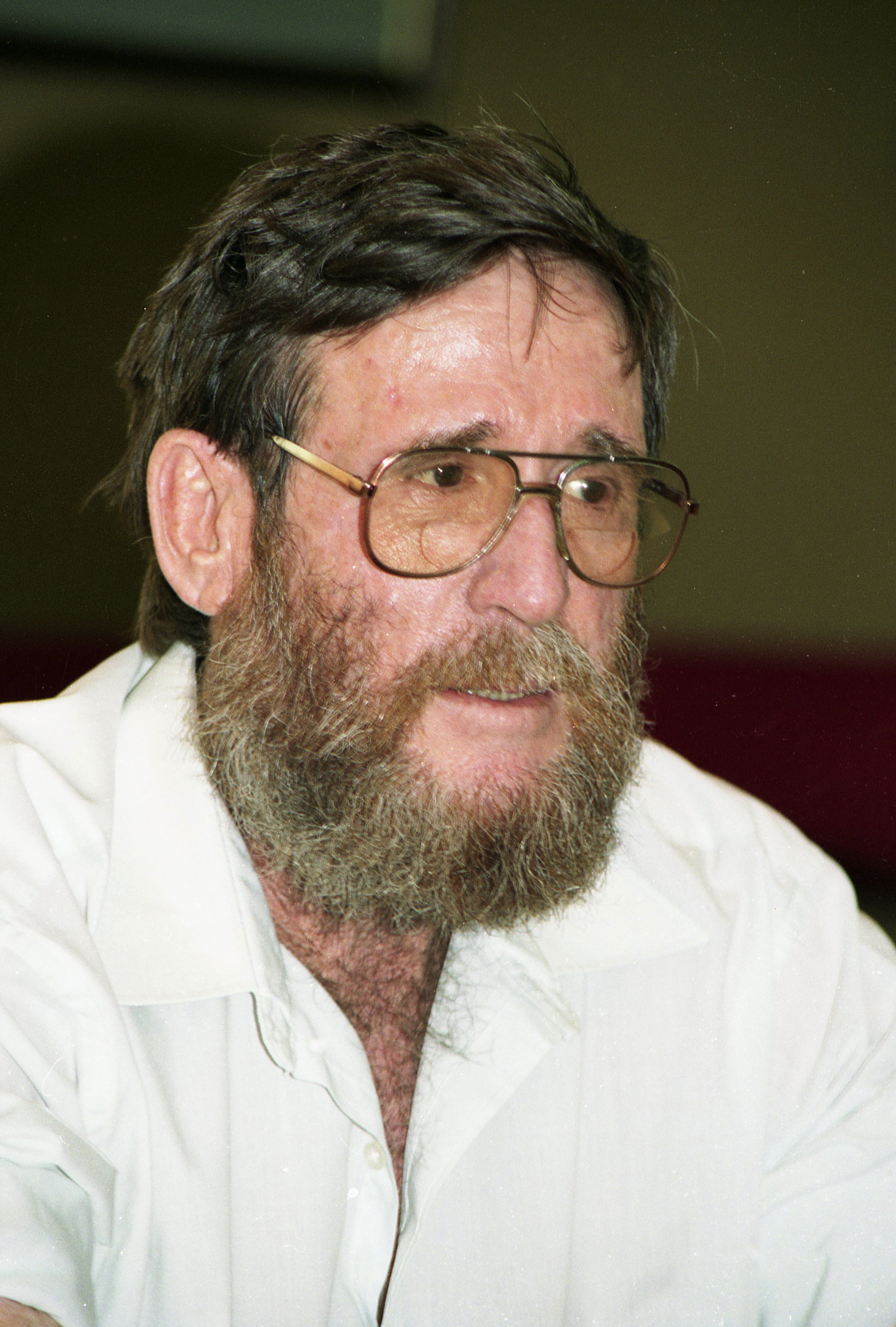
- Gal in 1992

Faction represented in the Knesset
- 1988–1991: Alignment
- 1991–1996: Labor Party

Personal details
- Born: 14 February 1933 (age 92); Magdiel, Mandatory Palestine

Gedalia Gal (Hebrew: גדליה גל; born 14 February 1933) is an Israeli farmer and former politician who served as a member of the Knesset for the Alignment and Labor Party from 1988 until 1996.

== Biography ==
Born in Magdiel during the Mandate era, Gal attended a professional high school and went on to work in agriculture, including emissary work for the Moshavim Movement.

In 1988 he was elected to the Knesset on the Alignment list. In 1992 he was heavily involved in what became known as the "Gal law", which dealt with moshavim's debts. He was re-elected in 1992, by which time the Alignment, followed a merge, ran as the Labor Party. During his second term he chaired the influential Finance Committee and was involved in the creation of the 1996 Electricity Law. He was involved in the Third Way movement, but did not join when it became an official party, preferring to remain in the Labor Party. However, he lost his seat in the 1996 elections.

After leaving the Knesset he was appointed CEO of Tnuva dairy company, a post he held until 2001. He later chaired the board of the Society for the Protection of Nature in Israel and the Ammunition Hill museum. He lives in Kfar Vitkin and is involved in livestock rearing.
