= Hagai Meirom =

Israeli politician (born 1946)

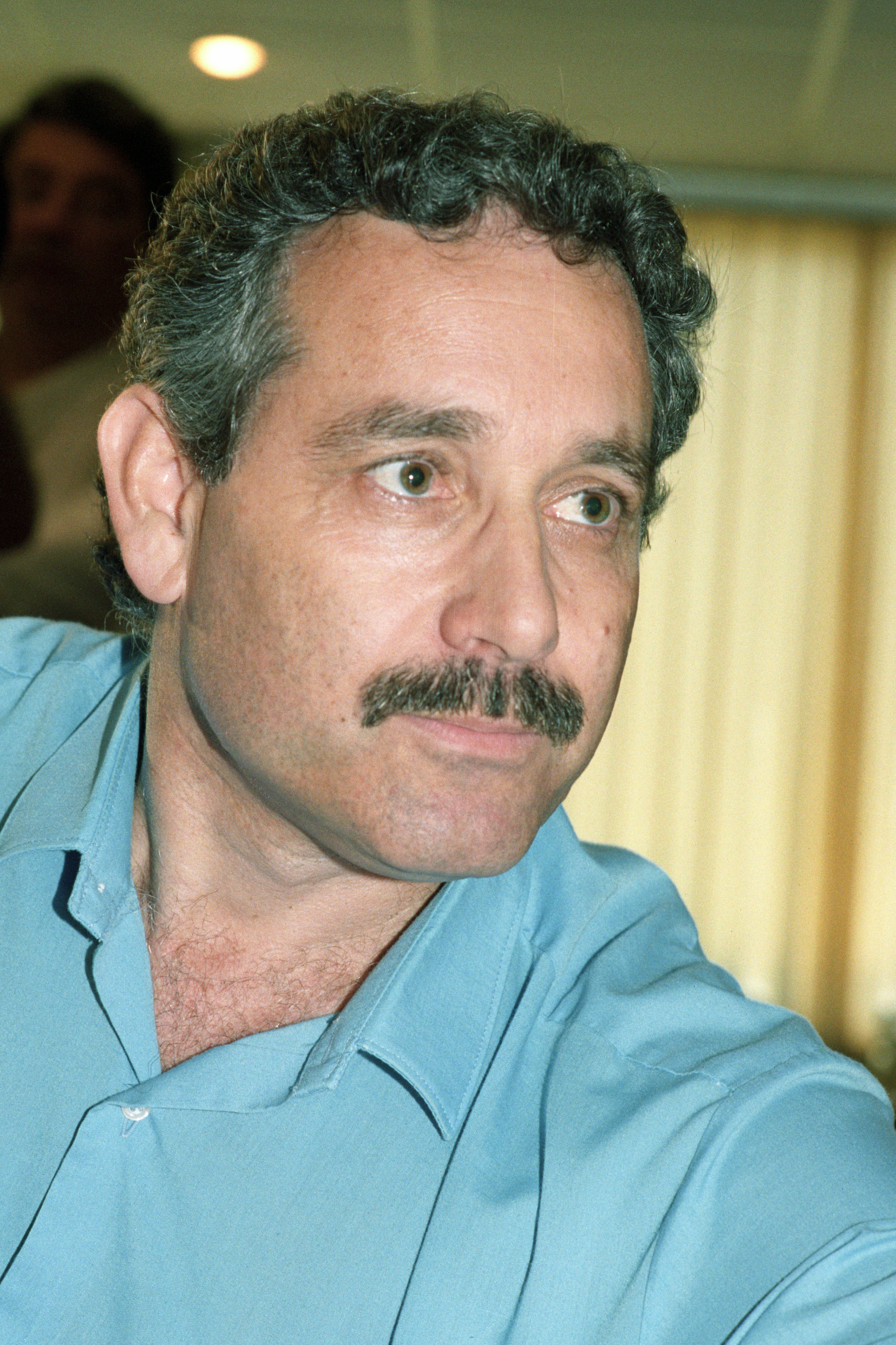
- Meirom in 1992

Faction represented in the Knesset
- 1988–1991: Alignment
- 1991–1999: Labor Party
- 1999: Center Party

Personal details
- Born: 23 September 1946 (age 80) Afula, Mandatory Palestine

Hagai Meirom (Hebrew: חגי מירום; born 23 September 1946) is an Israeli former politician who served as a member of the Knesset for the Alignment, Labor Party and the Center Party between 1988 and 1999.

== Biography ==
Born in Afula during the Mandate era, Meirom served as general secretary of HaNoar HaOved VeHaLomed youth movement and studied law at Tel Aviv University, gaining an LLB, before working as a lawyer and agriculturalist. A member of Histadrut's executive, he also served on the union's high court and was a member of the Kibbutz Movement secretariat.

He was first elected to the Knesset in 1988 on the Alignment's list (the party was renamed the Labor Party in 1991). Re-elected in 1992, during his second term he chaired several key committees, including the House Committee, the Foreign Affairs and Defense Committee, and the Joint Committee for the Knesset Budget.

He retained his seat in the 1996 elections, and during his third term served as a Knesset Observer to NATO and chairman of the Israel-Italy Parliamentary Friendship League.

On 23 February 1999 he was one of two Labor Party MKs to break away and establish Israel in the Centre (later renamed the Centre Party), alongside four Likud MKs. For the 1999 elections he was placed tenth on the Centre Party list, but lost his seat as the party won only six seats.
