= Da (political party) =

Movement for Democracy and Aliyah התנועה לדמוקרטיה ועלייה
- Leader: Yuli Kosharovsky
- Founded: 1992
- Ideology: Soviet immigrant interests Liberalism
- Political position: Center
- Most MKs: 0

The Movement for Democracy and Aliyah (Hebrew: התנועה לדמוקרטיה ועלייה, HaTnu'a LeDemokratia VeAliya), commonly known as Da (Hebrew: דה; Russian: ДА, lit. 'Yes'), was a minor Israeli political party founded by immigrants from the former Soviet Union in the early 1990s.

== History ==
Da was established in winter 1992 and was closely associated with the well-known refusenik Natan Sharansky, who Da's members hoped would head the party's list. After several changes of heart, Sharansky turned the offer down.

Most of Da's founders and key members had been refuseniks or Prisoners of Zion. Da was one of three parties contesting the 1992 Knesset elections that were established to capture the votes of recent immigrants from the former Soviet Union, the other two being Tali (Israel Renaissance Movement) and Yad BeYad Gimlaim Ve'Olim (Pensioners and Immigrants). All three put the failure of the immigration and absorption process at the center of their platforms. Da was the largest and best organized of the three. It did not take a position on peace and security matters. It ran as a centrist party and defined itself as generally liberal, but did not rule out future cooperation with the left.

Led by Yuli Kosharovsky, in the elections that year the party received 11,697 votes (0.4% of the total, and around 5% of the immigrant vote), and failed to cross the electoral threshold of 1.5%. Most Russian immigrants voted for the Labor Party.

Notable members included Gennady Riger, who later served as general secretary and a MK for Yisrael BaAliyah, another immigrant party.
