= Pinchas Goldstein =

Israeli politician (1939–2007)

- פנחס גולדשטיין
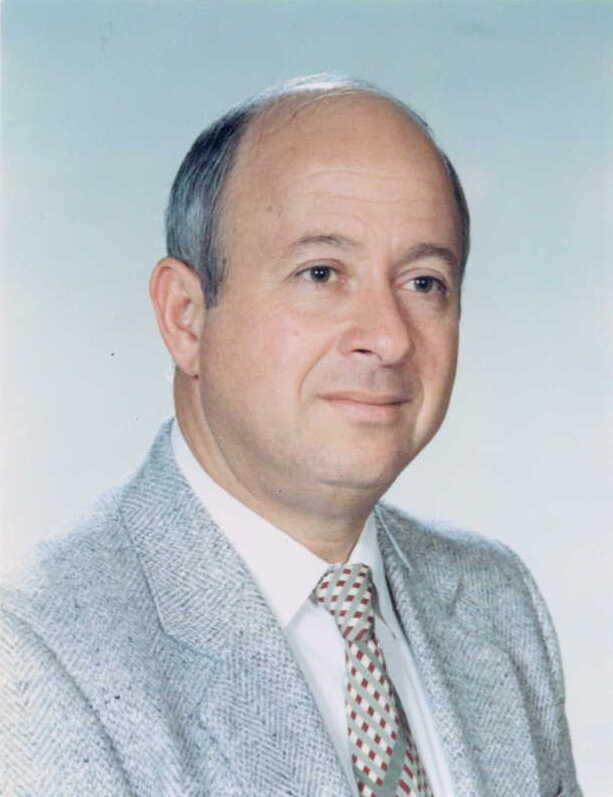

Faction represented in the Knesset
- 1981–1990: Likud
- 1990–1992: New Liberal Party

Personal details
- Born: 26 August 1939 Tel Aviv, Mandatory Palestine
- Died: 14 August 2007 (aged 67) Kfar Saba, Israel

Pinchas Goldstein (Hebrew: פנחס גולדשטיין; born 26 August 1939, died 14 August 2007) was an Israeli politician, who served as a member of the Knesset for Likud and the New Liberal Party between 1981 and 1992, and as Deputy Minister of Communications and Deputy Minister of Education and Culture during the early 1990s.

== Biography ==
Born in Tel Aviv during the Mandate era, Goldstein graduated from the Haifa military school of command, a boarding school, and went on to study law at the Tel Aviv branch of the Hebrew University of Jerusalem, but did not graduate. He was a member of the board of directors of Israel Electric Corporation from 1978 to 1981, and a member of the Executive of World Zionist Organization from 1978 to 1982.

Originally a member of the Liberal Party, he was elected to the Knesset on the Likud list (an alliance of Herut, the Liberal Party and other right-wing factions) in 1981. He was re-elected in 1984 and 1988. On 15 March 1990, Goldstein and four other Likud MKs left the party to establish the Party for the Advancement of the Zionist Idea, which was later renamed the New Liberal Party. This was part of what became known as the dirty trick, with Shimon Peres attempting to form a new government without Likud. Although Peres failed, the new faction joined a Likud-led government and Goldstein was appointed as Deputy Minister of Communications, and later Deputy Minister of Education and Culture.

The New Liberal Party failed to cross the electoral threshold in the 1992 elections and Goldstein lost his seat.

He died of cancer on 14 August 2007 at the age of 67. He was survived by his wife, a son, and a daughter.
