= Yair Levy =

Israeli Haredi rabbi and politician (1952–2026)

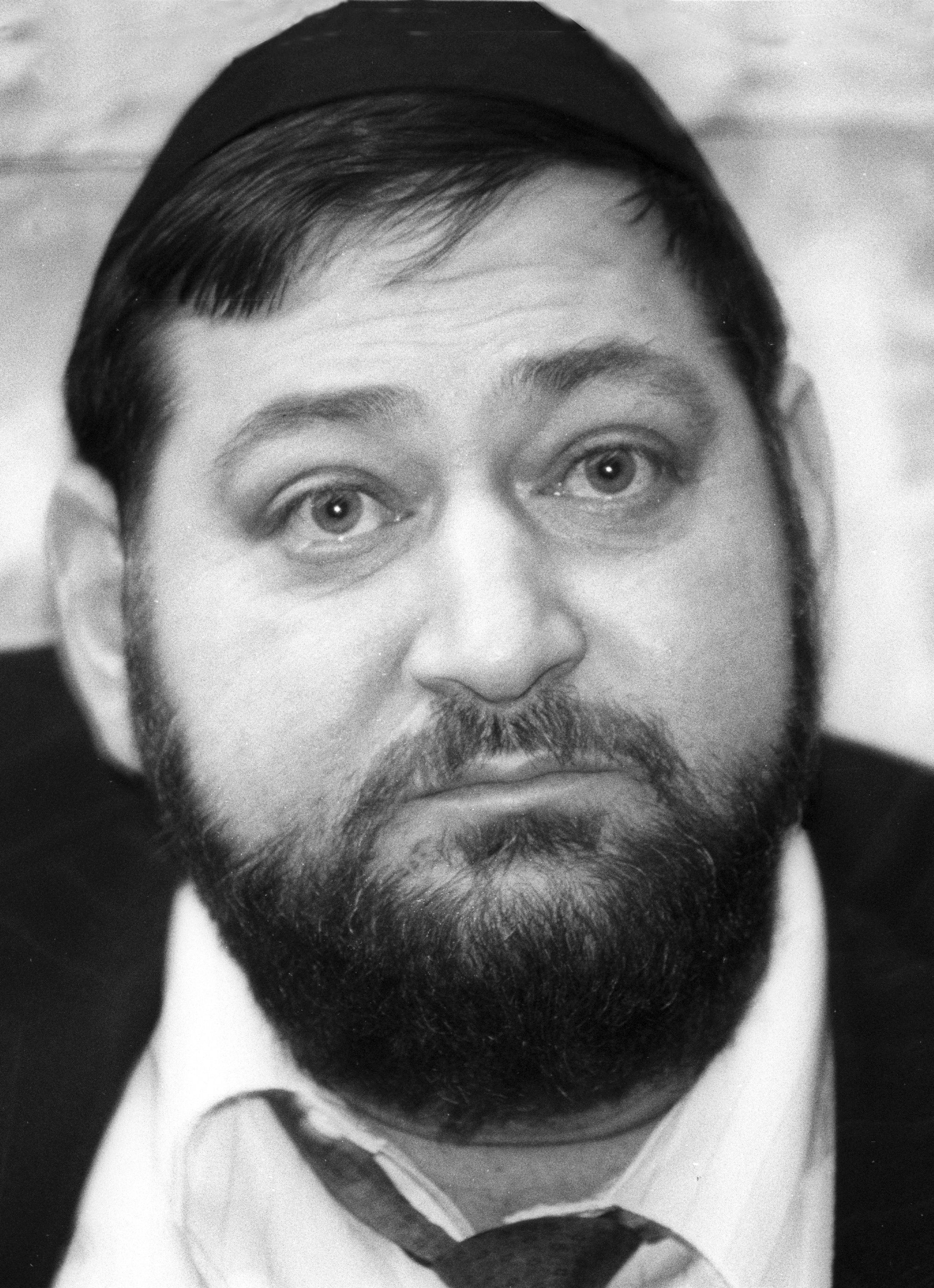
- Levy in 1991

Faction represented in the Knesset
- 1988–1992: Shas

Personal details
- Born: 11 October 1952 Tiberias, Israel
- Died: 20 March 2026 (aged 73) Bnei Brak, Israel

Yair Levy (Hebrew: יאיר לוי; 11 October 1952 – 20 March 2026) was an Israeli Haredi rabbi and politician who served as a member of the Knesset for Shas between 1988 and 1992.

== Life and career ==
Born in Tiberias in 1952, Levy attended a rabbinical seminary, and was certified as a rabbi. During his national service in the IDF, he was a camp commander in the Oded Brigade and was injured during the Yom Kippur War.

Levy joined the Shas party during the 1980s, and served as its secretary and secretary of its schooling system. He was elected to the Knesset on the party's list in 1988, but lost his seat in the 1992 elections. In 1993, he was jailed for five years for embezzling NIS 500,000 from the party's El HaMa'ayan organisation.

Levy died on 20 March 2026, at the age of 73.

== See also ==
- List of Israeli public officials convicted of crimes or misdemeanors
