= Pesah Grupper =

Israeli politician (1924–2013)

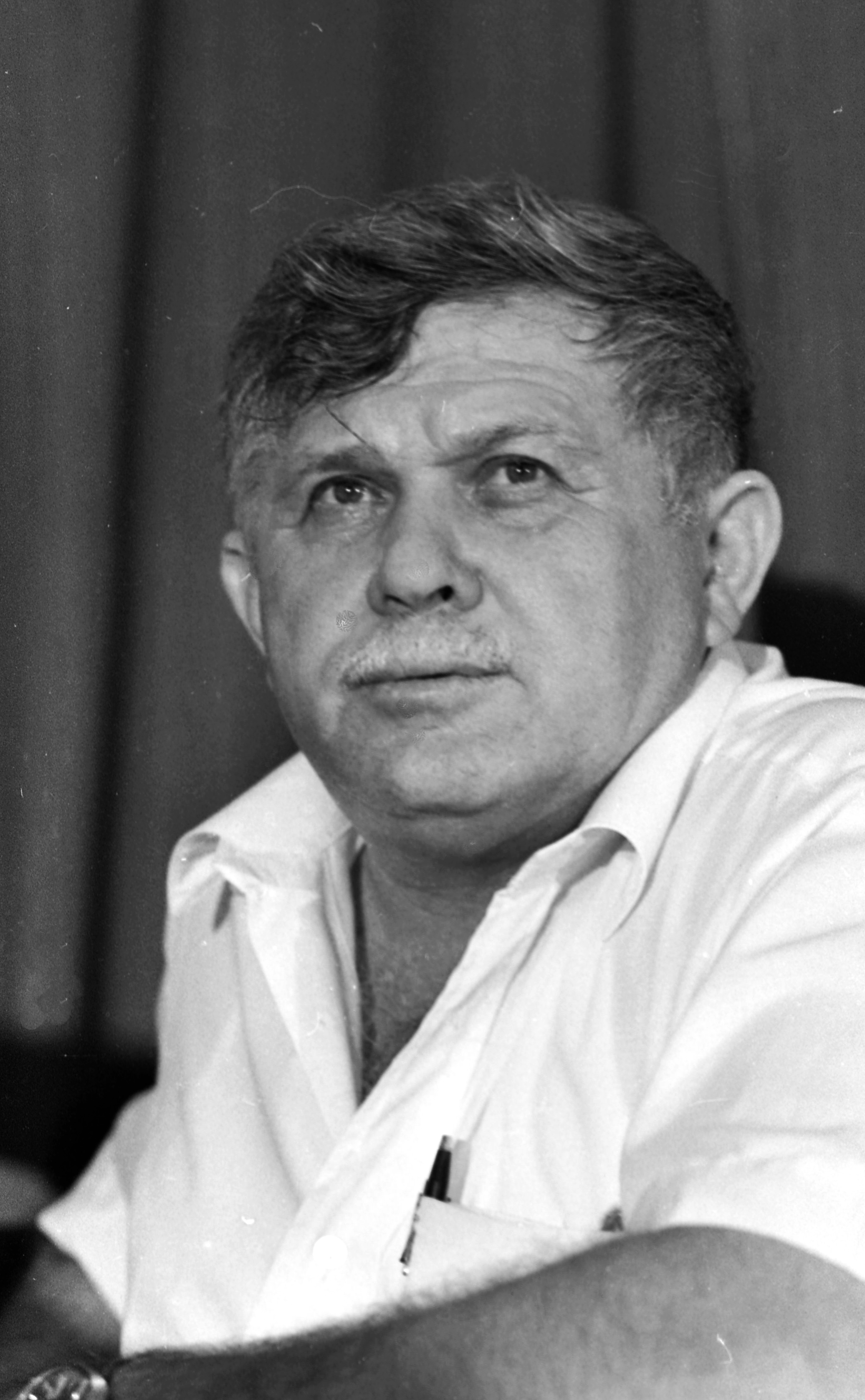
- Grupper in 1984

Ministerial roles
- 1983–1984: Minister of Agriculture

Faction represented in the Knesset
- 1974–1990: Likud
- 1990–1992: New Liberal Party

Personal details
- Born: 21 August 1924; Tel Aviv, Mandatory Palestine
- Died: 29 April 2013 (aged 88)

Pesah Grupper (Hebrew: פסח גרופר; 21 August 1924 – 29 April 2013) was an Israeli politician who served as Minister of Agriculture between October 1983 and September 1984.

== Biography ==
Grupper was born in Tel Aviv during the Mandate era. He served as head of Atlit local council between 1959 and 1962 and again from 1969 until 1971.

He was elected to the Knesset on Likud's list in 1973, and retained his seat in elections in 1977. In March 1978 he proposed that a psychiatrist visit the Knesset once a week to help MKs deal with overworking and stress. The proposal was met with ridicule from other MKs.

He retained his seat again in the 1981 Knesset elections. Following the elections, he was appointed Deputy Minister of Agriculture, a role he held until 1983, when he became Minister of Agriculture in Yitzhak Shamir's government. Although re-elected in 1984, he lost his place in the cabinet.

Following re-election in 1988, in March 1990 Grupper and four other Likud MKs left the party to form the Party for the Advancement of the Zionist Idea (later renamed New Liberal Party). The party ran in the 1992 elections, but failed to cross the electoral threshold, resulting in Grupper losing his seat.

Grupper died on 29 April 2013 aged 88.
