= Ovadia Eli =

Israeli politician (born 1945)

- עובדיה עלי
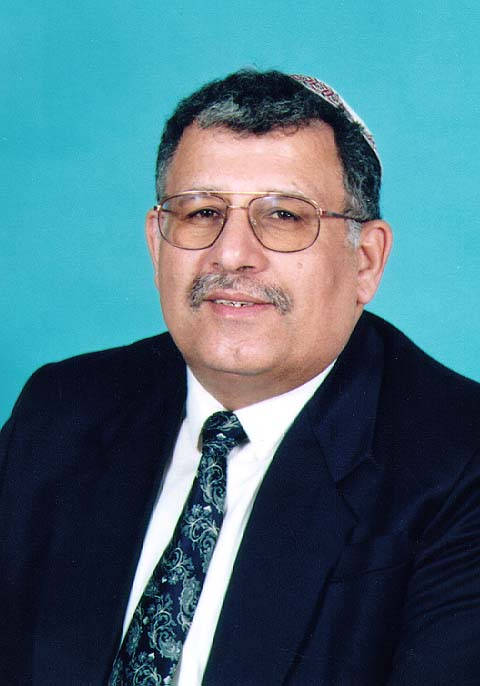
- Eli during his time in the Knesset

Faction represented in the Knesset
- 1984–1996: Likud

Personal details
- Born: 22 May 1945 (age 81) Khanaqin, Iraq

Ovadia Eli (Hebrew: עובדיה עלי; born 22 May 1945) is an Israeli former politician who served as a member of the Knesset for Likud from 1984 until 1996, Deputy Minister of Defense between 1991 and 1992, and mayor of Afula from 1978 until 1991. Since leaving the Knesset he has headed several government-owned companies and is currently the CEO of the Israel Airports Authority.

== Life and politics ==
Born in Khanaqin in Iraq in 1945, Eli emigrated to Israel in 1950. He studied at the Lifshitz College of Education and received a BA from the University of Haifa, after which he worked as a teacher. He later became head of the school system in the north of the country.

A member of Herut, he was elected mayor of Afula in 1978, a position he held until 1991. He was elected to the Knesset on the Likud list (then an alliance of Herut and other right-wing parties) in 1984. He was re-elected in 1988, and was appointed Deputy Speaker. On 8 July 1991 he was also appointed Deputy Defense Minister. During the Knesset term Eli chaired the Special Committee for Amending the Galilee Law and the Committee on Drug Abuse. He was re-elected again in 1992 and remained a Deputy Speaker until losing his seat in the 1996 elections (despite finishing 18th in the Likud primaries, he was assigned an unrealistic place on the party list).

After leaving the Knesset, he was appointed CEO of Oil Refineries Ltd by Minister of National Infrastructure, Ariel Sharon. In April 2005 he was appointed CEO of Israel Military Industries by Defense Minister Shaul Mofaz, but resigned in June 2006. In October that year, he became CEO of the Israel Airports Authority.

In addition to political activities, Eli was also a member of the board of the Jewish Agency for Israel and a member of the Amidar housing company's directorate.

Legal offices
Preceded by Committee Formed	Chairman of the Committee on Drug Abuse; 1989–1992	Succeeded by Rafael Eitan
