= Eliezer Mizrahi =

Israeli politician (born 1945)

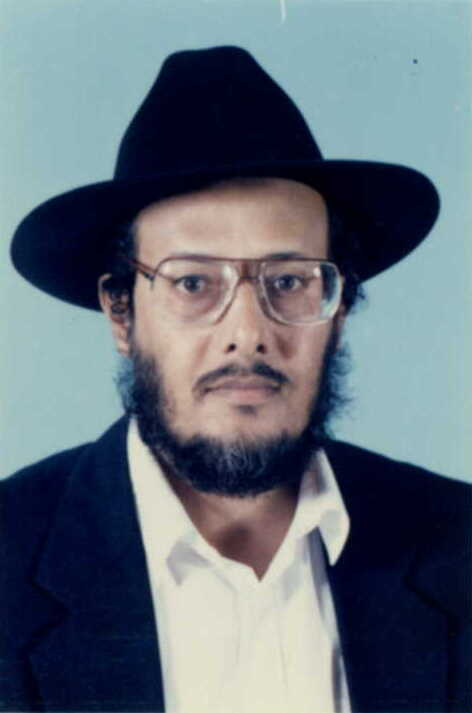
- Mizrahi in the mid-1980s

Faction represented in the Knesset
- 1988–1990: Agudat Yisrael
- 1990–1992: Geulat Yisrael

Personal details
- Born: 19 April 1945 (age 80); Rehovot, Mandatory Palestine

Eliezer Mizrahi (Hebrew: אליעזר מזרחי; born 19 April 1945) is an Israeli former politician who served as a member of the Knesset between 1988 and 1992, and as Deputy Minister of Health from 1990 until 1992.

== Biography ==
Born in Rehovot during the Mandate era, Mizrahi's father Ya'akov was an Agudat Yisrael politician. He was educated the Chabad-run Tomchei Temimim yeshiva and worked as a diamond polisher.

In 1988 he was elected to the Knesset on the Agudat Yisrael list. He was involved in the dirty trick in 1990, which resulted in him breaking away from the party to establish a new faction, Geulat Yisrael. He joined Yitzhak Shamir's government, and was appointed Deputy Minister of Health on 25 June. He lost his seat in the 1992 elections after the party failed to cross the electoral threshold. He later joined Likud and was placed thirty-fifth on the party's list for the 1996 elections, but failed to win a seat.
