= Yosef Goldberg =

Israeli politician (1942–2002)

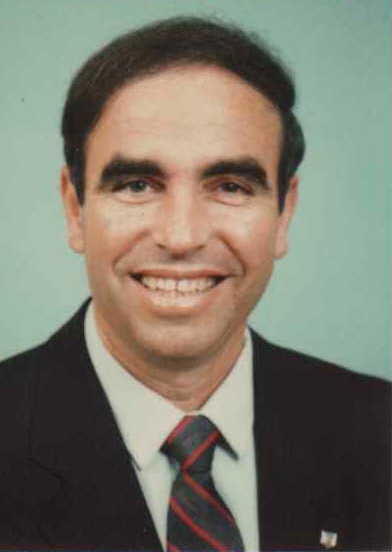

Faction represented in the Knesset
- 1988–1990: Likud
- 1990: Party for the Advancement of the Zionist Idea
- 1990–1992: Likud

Personal details
- Born: 8 April 1942; Metula, Mandatory Palestine
- Died: 8 June 2002 (aged 60)

Yosef "Yossi" Goldberg (Hebrew: יוסף גולדברג; 8 April 1942 – 8 June 2002) was an Israeli farmer and politician who served as mayor of Metula from 1978 until 1998, and as a member of the Knesset for Likud and the Party for the Advancement of the Zionist Idea between 1988 and 1992.

== Biography ==
Goldberg was born in Metula during the Mandate era. His father was a founder of the town and a local Mukhtar. He was educated at a local primary school before attending the Mikveh Israel agricultural high school. He went on to work as a farmer. A reserve Major in the IDF, he was commander of the northern settlements and was involved in establishing the Good Fence between Israel and Lebanon.

He joined the Liberal Party, becoming a member of its central committee. In 1978 he became head of Metula's local council, a role he held until 1998, and also was a member of the Centre for Local Government, the Development towns secretariat and chairman of the Association for Galilee Moshavim. He was elected to the Knesset on the Likud list (which the Liberal Party had merged into) in 1988. On 15 March 1990 he was one of five Likud members to break away and establish the Party for the Advancement of the Zionist Idea, later renamed the New Liberal Party. However, he returned to Likud on 4 December that year. He lost his seat in the 1992 elections.

In 1989 he was one of the founders and the first president of the Israel Ice Skating Federation.

He died in 2002 at the age of 60.
