= Yosef Azran =

Israeli rabbi and politician (1941–2010)

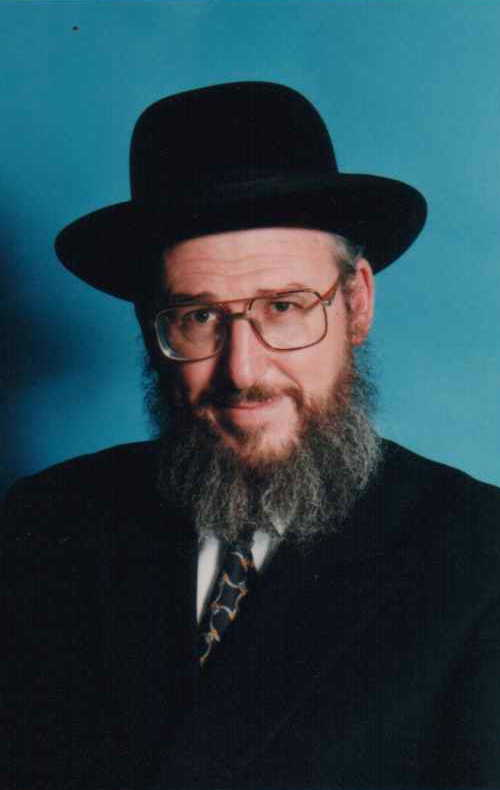
- Azran during his time in the Knesset

Faction represented in the Knesset
- 1988–1996: Shas
- 1996: Independent

Personal details
- Born: 19 October 1941 Marrakesh, Morocco
- Died: 10 February 2010 (aged 68)

Yosef Azran (Hebrew: יוסף עזרן; 19 October 1941 – 10 February 2010) was an Israeli rabbi and politician who served as a member of the Knesset between 1988 and 1996, and as Deputy Minister of Finance from 1990 until 1992.

== Biography ==
Born in Marrakesh, Morocco in 1941, Azran emigrated to Israel in 1957. He studied at a yeshiva after high school, and was ordained as a rabbi at the Harry Fischel Institute. He worked as a rabbi in a neighbourhood in Jerusalem, as director of a boarding school in Strasbourg in France, as director of the Torah Institution in Ashdod, before becoming the chief rabbi of Kiryat Malakhi and later Rishon LeZion.

He joined the new Shas party in the 1980s, and was elected to the Knesset on the party's list in 1988. On 2 July 1990 he was appointed Deputy Minister of Finance. He retained his seat in the 1992 elections, but on 28 February 1996 left the party to sit as an independent. During the 13th Knesset he was Deputy Speaker. In the May 1996 elections he headed a new party named Telem Emuna, but it won only 0.4% of the vote, failing to cross the electoral threshold, and he lost his seat.

He died in 2010 at the age of 68.
