= Avraham Sharir =

Israeli politician (1932–2017)

Abraham Sharir
- אברהם שריר
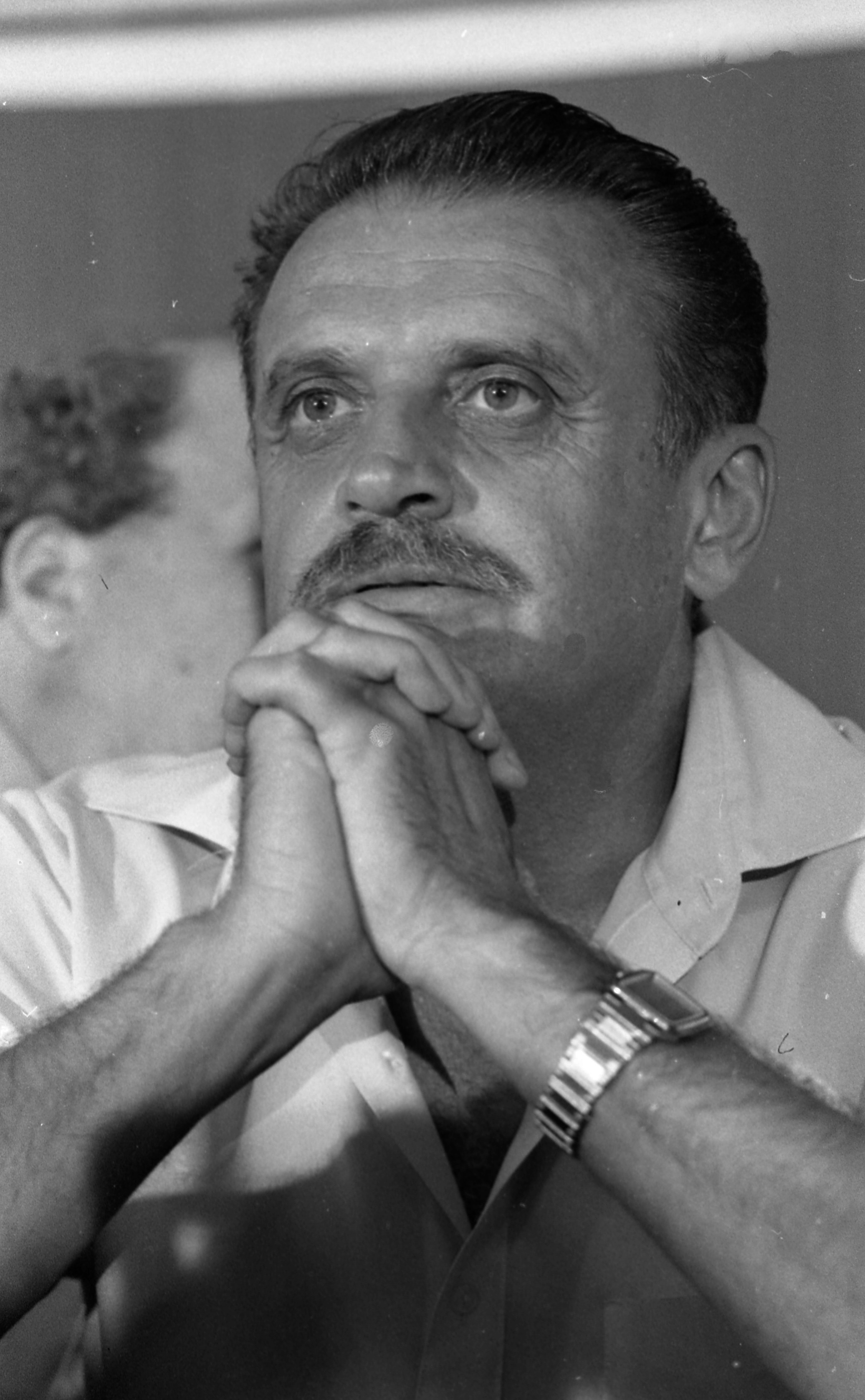

Ministerial roles
- 1981–1988: Minister of Tourism
- 1986–1988: Minister of Justice

Faction represented in the Knesset
- 1977–1990: Consolidation
- 1990: Party for the Advancement of the Zionist Idea
- 1990–1992: Consolidation

Personal details
- Born: 23 December 1932 Iași, Romania
- Died: 24 March 2017 (aged 84) Tel Aviv, Israel
- Party: Consolidation

Abraham Sharir (Hebrew: אברהם שריר, romanized: Avraham Sharir; 23 December 1932 – 24 March 2017) was an Israeli politician.

== Biography ==
Sharir was born in 1932 in Iași in Kingdom of Romania, where he attended high school. After immigrating to Palestine in the 1940s, he studied law at the Hebrew University of Jerusalem and was certified as a lawyer. From 1954 to 1964 he was secretary of the General Zionist faction in the Knesset. He was the director of the economics department of the Jewish Agency in the United States from 1964 to 1967 and director of the coordinating bureau of the economic organizations of the employers in Israel from 1967 to 1970. He was the economic consul in Atlanta from 1970 to 1972 and then in Western United States until 1974. From 1974 to 1977 he was General Secretary of the Liberal Party and its chairman of the national board.

He was elected to the ninth Knesset in 1977 for the Likud and again in 1981, 1984 and 1988. He was a member of the finance committee in the ninth Knesset and of the foreign affairs & defense committee in the twelfth. He was the Minister of Tourism in the tenth Knesset and also Minister of Justice in the eleventh.

In 1990 he left the Likud to form the New Liberal Party. In April he became involved in "the dirty trick" by joining Shimon Peres' attempt to form a narrow government. When that move failed, he accepted a request made by Prime Minister Yitzhak Shamir to return to the Likud. This effectively put an end to his political career, and he retired in 1992.
