= Geulat Yisrael =

Haredi Israeli political party

Geulat Yisrael גאולת ישראל
- Leader: Eliezer Mizrahi
- Founded: 25 December 1990
- Dissolved: 1990s
- Split from: Agudat Yisrael
- Ideology: Ultra-Orthodox interest
- Political position: Centre-right
- Most MKs: 1 (1990–1992)
- Fewest MKs: 1 (1990–1992)

Election symbol
- קל

Geulat Israel (Hebrew: גאולת ישראל, lit. 'Salvation of Israel') was a short-lived Haredi political party in Israel in the early 1990s.

== Background ==
The party was established on 25 December 1990 when Eliezer Mizrahi broke away from Agudat Yisrael. Despite leaving the party, Mizrahi remained Deputy Minister of Health.

The party participated in the 1992 elections, where it won 12,851 votes (0.5%). However, this was not enough to cross the electoral threshold of 1.5% and Mizrahi lost his seat. The party subsequently disappeared.

== Leaders ==
Leader	Took office	Left office
Eliezer Mizrahi	1990	1992

== Election results ==
Election	Leader	Votes	%	Seats	+/–	Status
1992	Eliezer Mizrahi	12,851	0.49%	0 / 120	▼1	Extraparliamentary
