= Yitzhak Moda'i =

Israeli politician (1926–1998)

- יצחק מודעי
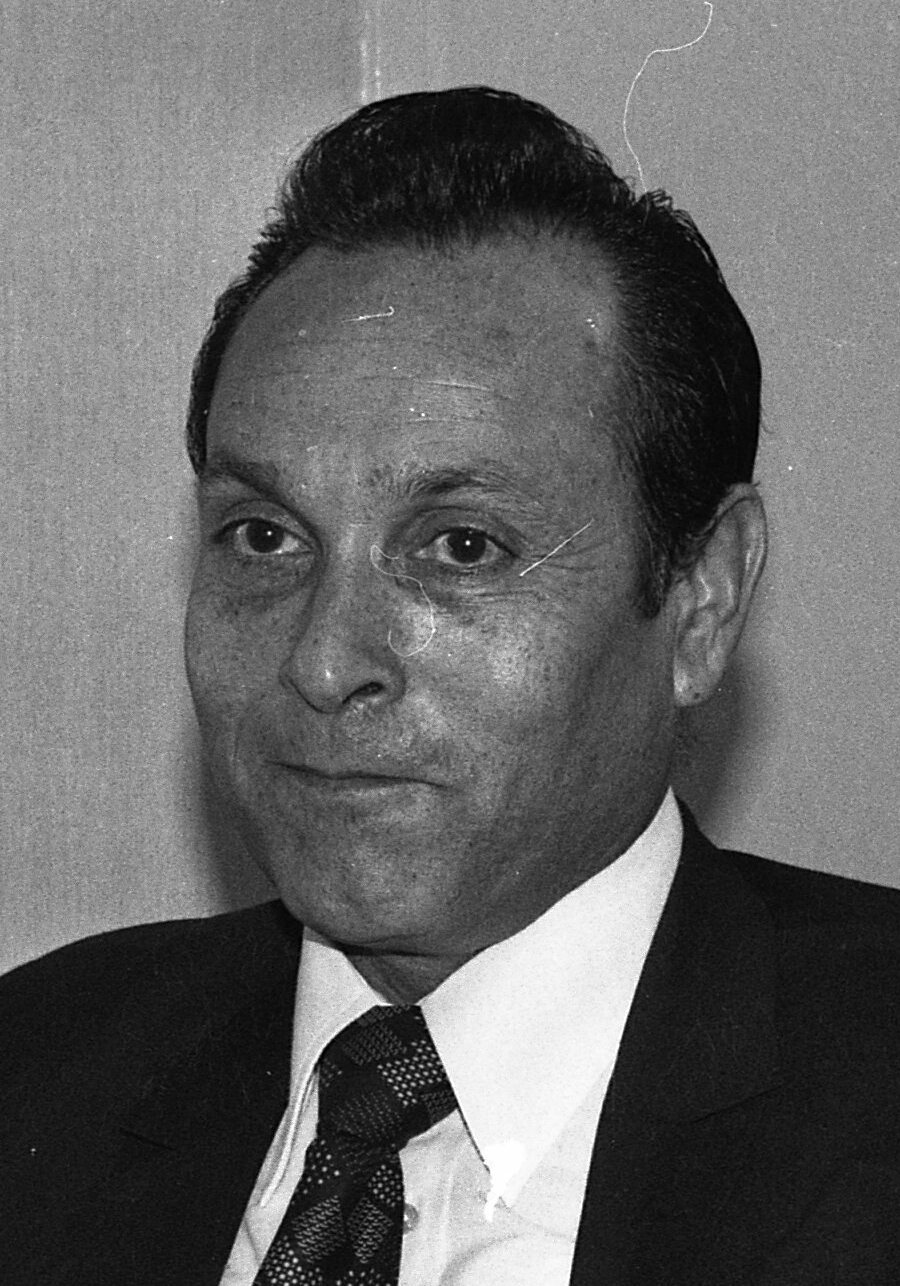

Ministerial roles
- 1977–1981: Minister of Energy & Infrastructure
- 1979–1980: Minister of Communications
- 1981–1982: Minister without Portfolio
- 1982–1984: Minister of Energy & Infrastructure
- 1984–1986: Minister of Finance
- 1986: Minister of Justice
- 1986–1988: Minister without Portfolio
- 1988–1990: Minister of Economics & Planning
- 1990–1992: Minister of Finance

Faction represented in the Knesset
- 1974–1990: Likud
- 1990–1992: New Liberal Party

Personal details
- Born: 17 January 1926 Tel Aviv, Mandatory Palestine
- Died: 14 May 1998 (aged 72)

Yitzhak Moda'i (Hebrew: יצחק מודעי; 17 January 1926 – 14 May 1998) was an Israeli politician who served five terms in the Knesset for Likud and then the New Liberal Party over the course of a 20-year career.

== Biography ==
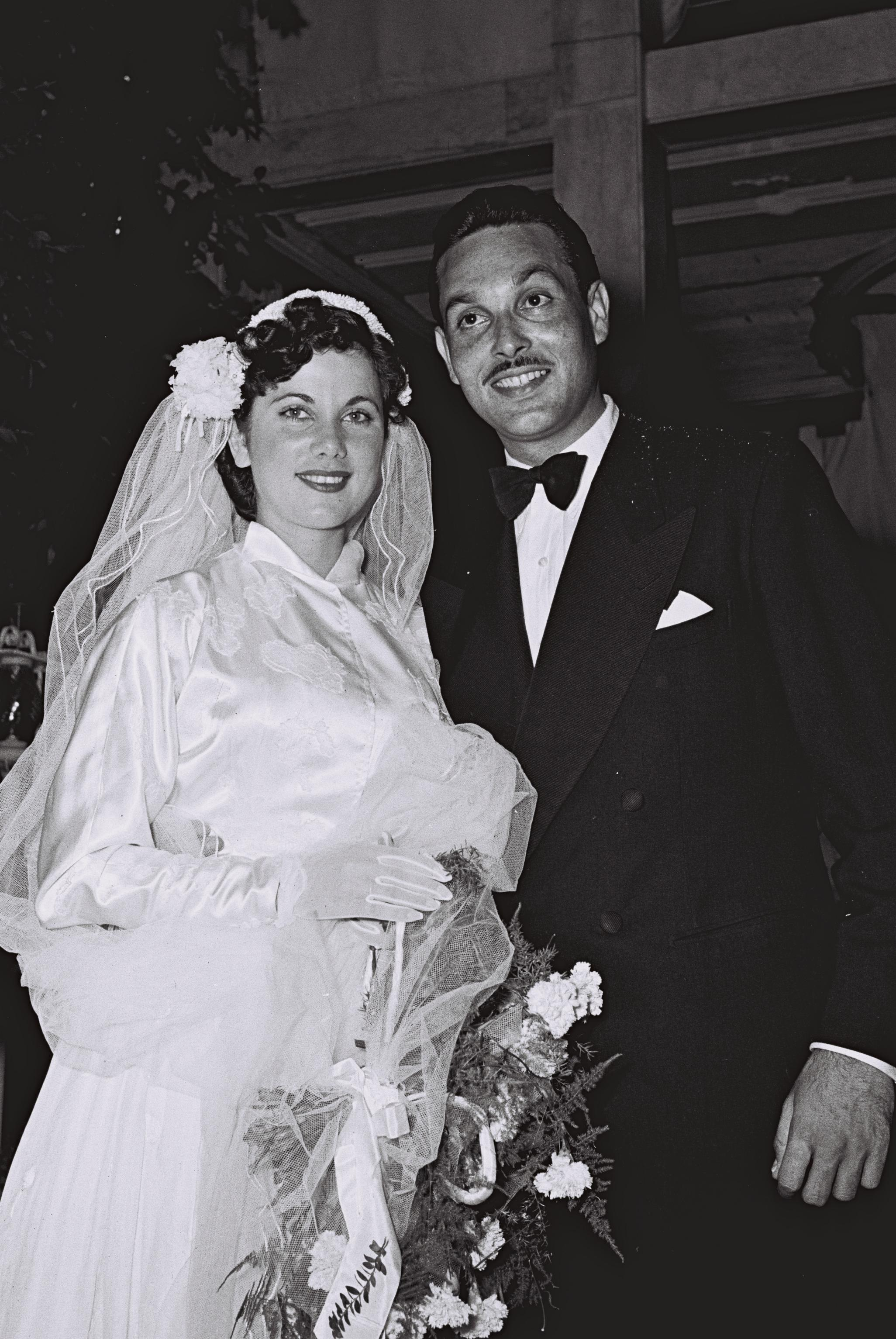
Yitzhak Moda'i and his wife Michal

Yitzhak Madzovitch (later Moda'i) was born in Tel Aviv during the Mandate era. He attended high school in Tel Aviv and studied at the Technion in Haifa. He went on to study law at the Tel Aviv branch of Hebrew University of Jerusalem, and law and economics at the London School of Economics. He served as a platoon and company commander in the Israel Defense Forces during the 1948 Arab-Israeli War.

His wife, Michal Har'el (née Herison), was Miss Israel, and then president of the Women's International Zionist Organization. They had three children. The eldest, Harela, was killed in a car accident when she was 22. A prize is awarded annually at the Army Radio in her name. Their son, Boaz Moda'i, is a senior diplomat in the Israeli Ministry of Foreign Affairs, since October 2019 serving as Israel's ambassador to Slovakia.

== Political career ==
In 1961 he joined the Liberal Party, and was a member of its directorate between 1965 and 1968. From 1969 until 1973 he served as a member of Herzliya's municipal council.

He was first elected to the Knesset on the Likud list (the Liberal Party had become a faction within Likud, alongside Herut). He was re-elected in 1977, and served as Minister of National Infrastructure in Menachem Begin's first government, also holding the post of Minister of Communications between 15 January 1979 and 22 December 1980. In Begin's cabinet as Energy Minister, Modai was considered to be one of the "hawkish" hardliners. In December 1979 in his role as Energy Minister, Modai announced the Israeli government's intent to take over the Arab-run East Jerusalem Electric Company, which was viewed as one of the last existing symbols of Palestinian autonomy. The move, which appeared to have political motives in addition to the officially stated ones, brought immediate condemnation from Palestinian leaders. In May 1980, cabinet post disagreements, including that of Modai, imperiled the government coalition. Begin nominated Modai for Foreign Minister, but the Democratic Movement protested that Modai was unqualified and six members would vote against it. Then the Liberals, who controlled 13 seats, said they would bring down the government, thereby forcing new elections, if Modai was not confirmed. Begin stalled a collapse by serving as his own defense minister.

After being re-elected again in 1981, he became a Minister without Portfolio, before returning to the Energy and Infrastructure post in October 1982. Following the 1984 elections he became Minister of Finance. In 1985 he and Prime Minister Shimon Peres devised the economic stabilization plan that managed to curtail Israel's hyperinflation of the early 1980s. Due to the plan, the Israeli economy averted total collapse and inflation was reduced from an annual rate of almost 450% to less than 20% in less than two years. This plan has become a model for other countries facing similar economic situations. During the dramatic and sometimes difficult process of economic stabilization, Moda'i became known for being brilliant, but was also perceived as volatile, autocratic and chronically obstreperous.

On 16 April 1986 he switched to the Minister of Justice, before leaving the cabinet. In July 1986 Prime Minister Shimon Peres, the leader of the Labor Party, forced Modai to resign after Modai sharply criticized Peres. Modai, who was known for having a "sharp tongue," had been heard on public radio saying he did not need to consult Peres because "Peres doesn't understand law, just like he doesn't understand economics." In his role as Justice Minister, Modai was involved in handling a scandal, known as the Bus 300 affair involving Shin Bet. In announcing his forced resignation, Modai commented, "The restraint demanded of me is too much for flesh and blood." Modai returned to the government as a Minister without Portfolio in November. Between 1984 and 1988 he also served as chairman of the Liberal Party's presidium.

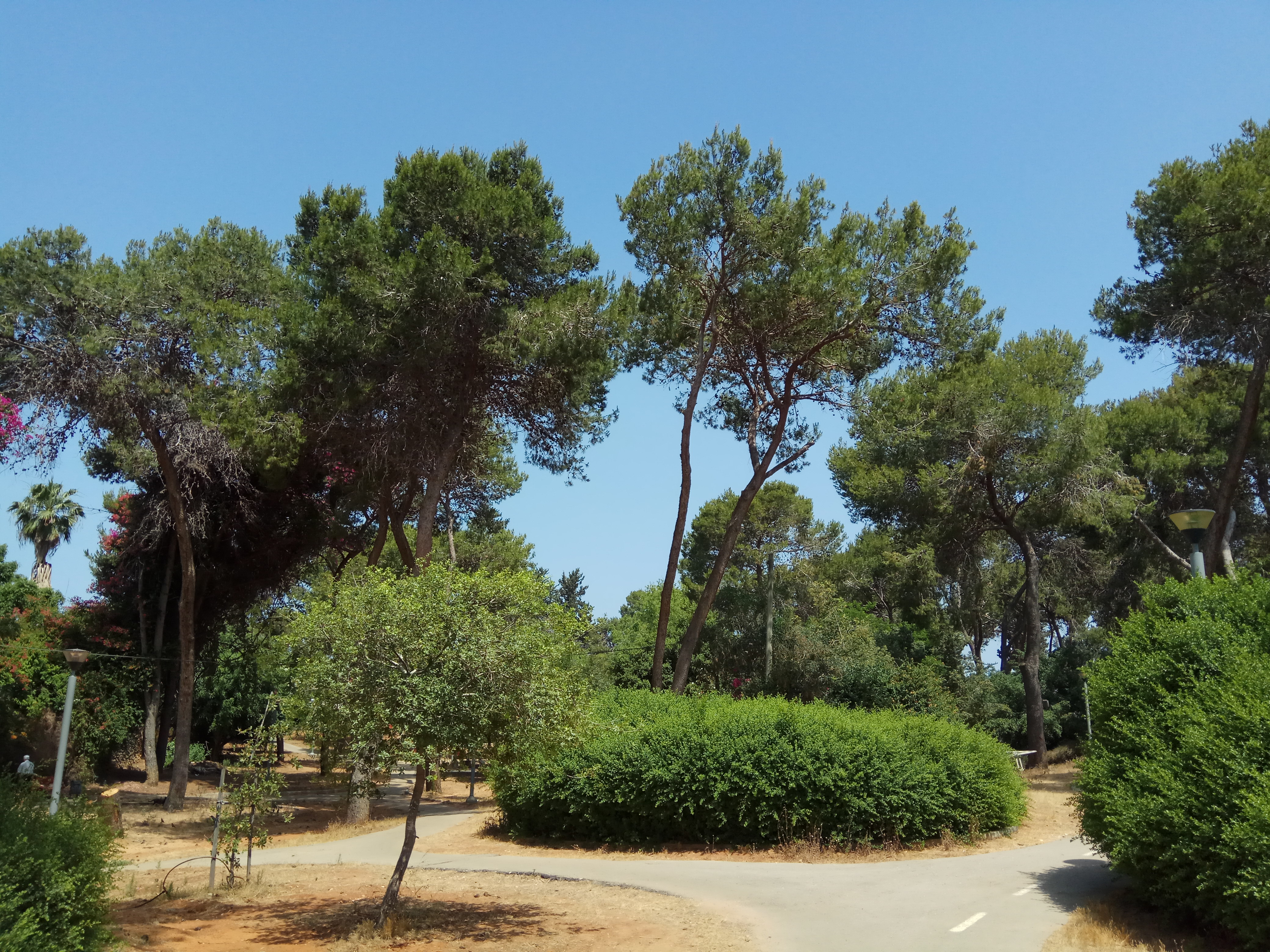
Yitzhak Moda'i park, Tzahala

After the 1988 elections he was appointed Minister of Economics and Planning, before returning to the Finance portfolio in 1990. On 15 March 1990 he and four other MKs (all of them former members of the Liberal Party) broke away from Likud to form the Party for the Advancement of the Zionist Idea, later renamed the New Liberal Party; however, the new party remained in the government and Moda'i became Finance Minister again in 1990.

The New Liberal Party failed to cross the electoral threshold in the 1992 elections and Moda'i lost his seat.
