= New Liberal Party (Israel) =

New Liberal Party מפלגה ליברלית חדשה
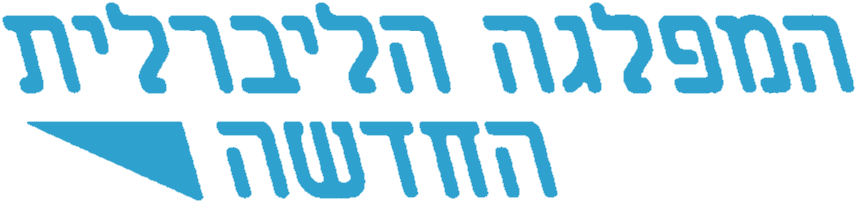
- Leader: Yitzhak Moda'i
- Founded: 15 March 1990
- Split from: Likud
- Ideology: Liberalism (Israel)
- Most MKs: 5 (1990)
- Fewest MKs: 0 (1992)

Election symbol
- קן

The New Liberal Party (Hebrew: מפלגה ליברלית חדשה, Miflaga Libralit Hadasha), also known as the Center Movement, was a political party in Israel founded in 1987.

== Background ==
The New Liberal Party was formed in mid-1987 as an alliance of the Independent Liberals and a number of former Likud Liberals, led by Yitzhak Berman, who had briefly organized as the Liberal Center in 1986 under a generally right-leaning platform that nevertheless supported ceding part of the West Bank in a peace treaty with Jordan. It presented a joint list with Shinui for the 1988 elections, which won two seats.

The party formed a faction in the Knesset on 15 March 1990 during the twelfth Knesset by five MKs who had broken away from Likud. Originally known as the Party for the Advancement of the Zionist Idea, all five MKs were former members of the original Liberal Party, which had merged into Likud in 1988.

Despite breaking away from his party, the new faction joined Yitzhak Shamir's government, with Yitzhak Moda'i appointed Minister of Finance. On 18 June 1990 Avraham Sharir returned to Likud, as did Yosef Goldberg on 4 December that year.

In March 1992, shortly before the elections that year, the party renamed itself the New Liberal Party. However, it won only 0.6% of the vote, failing to cross the electoral threshold and subsequently disappeared.

The party did not participate in the 1996 elections.

== Leaders ==
Leader	Took office	Left office
Yitzhak Moda'i	1990	1992

== Election results ==
Election	Leader	Votes	%	Seats	Status
1992	Yitzhak Moda'i	16,669	0.64%	0 / 120	Extraparliamentary

== Knesset Members ==
Knesset (MKs)	Knesset Members
12 (1990–1992) (5)	Pinhas Goldstein, Pesah Grupper, Yitzhak Moda'i, Yosef Goldberg (returned to Likud), Avraham Sharir (returned to Likud)
