= 1992 Israeli legislative election =

- 23 June 1992
- Turnout: 77.38%
| Party | Leader | Vote % | Seats | +/– |
|---|---|---|---|---|
| Labor | Yitzhak Rabin | 34.65 | 44 | +5 |
| Likud | Yitzhak Shamir | 24.89 | 32 | −8 |
| Meretz | Shulamit Aloni | 9.58 | 12 | +2 |
| Tzomet | Rafael Eitan | 6.36 | 8 | +6 |
| Mafdal | Zevulun Hammer | 4.95 | 6 | +1 |
| Shas | Aryeh Deri | 4.94 | 6 | 0 |
| UTJ | Avraham Yosef Shapira | 3.29 | 4 | −3 |
| Hadash | Tawfiq Ziad | 2.39 | 3 | −1 |
| Moledet | Rehavam Ze'evi | 2.38 | 3 | +1 |
| Mada | Abdulwahab Darawshe | 1.56 | 2 | +1 |
This lists parties that won seats. See the complete results below.
| Prime Minister before | Prime Minister after |
|---|---|
| Yitzhak Shamir; Likud | Yitzhak Rabin; Labor Party |

Elections for the 13th Knesset were held in Israel on 23 June 1992. The election resulted in the formation of a Labor government, led by Yitzhak Rabin, helped by the failure of several small right wing parties to pass the electoral threshold. Voter turnout was 77%.

== Background ==
The First Intifada, which began in 1987 and impacted the outcome of the 1988 election, had not ended by 1992.

In 1990, Labor's Shimon Peres tried to piece together a left-wing government against the Likud, which was known as the dirty trick. However, Agudat Yisrael bailed on the deal, and Peres's plan collapsed. He resigned from Labor leadership, and was replaced with former Prime Minister Yitzhak Rabin.

The breakout of the Gulf War had major ramifications for Israeli politics. Iraqi strikes on Israel in early 1991 killed 76 Israelis, and blame was placed onto the Likud for a poor response. While Iraq's leader Saddam Hussein had hoped Israel would retaliate and get Middle Eastern countries to support Iraq in the war, Jordan and the United States convinced Israel not to strike back. This had the effect of making the Likud look weak on defence issues.

The Gulf War also led to the further fragmentation of the left-wing Progressive List for Peace, as its Jewish members left over the party's support for Hussein's regime.

Rabin's Labour became more popular for its strong defence policy, which convinced Prime Minister Yitzhak Shamir to attempt negotiations with the Palestine Liberation Organization at the Madrid Conference of 1991. This was unpopular with right-wing voters, many of whom flocked to the radical-right Tzomet party, which withdrew from Shamir's government due to the conference.

In October 1991, the electoral threshold was raised from 1% to 1.5%. This was the first reform to the threshold since 1949. Previous proposals to raise it to 4% in the 1950s and the 1960s failed due to the protests of smaller parties. This time, smaller parties, including Mafdal and Tehiya were supportive of raising the threshold.

The downfall of the Soviet Union in December 1991 accelerated the aliyah of its Jewish population. From 1989 to 1991, over 340,000 Soviet Jews moved to Israel. Due to the Aliyah law, all Jewish immigrants to Israel are granted immediate citizenship and the right to vote. Initial polls predicted they would vote for Likud and other right-wing parties, due to their perceived dislike for socialism. A late 1990 PORI poll showed that 78% of Soviet Israelis surveyed would vote for a right-wing party. However, their votes began to shift away from the right, as they shared the general dissatisfaction for the Likud.

== Parliament factions ==
The table below lists the parliamentary factions represented in the 12th Knesset.

| Name | Ideology | Symbol | Leader | 1988 result | | Seats at 1992 dissolution |
| Name | Ideology | Symbol | Leader | Votes (%) | Seats | Seats at 1992 dissolution |
|---|---|---|---|---|---|---|
| Likud | National liberalism | מחל | Yitzhak Shamir | 31.1% | 40 / 120 | 38 / 120 |
| Labor (Note: The Israeli Labor Party faction was originally the Alignment faction, but by the time of the 1988 elections, the Alignment electoral alliance had no other member parties other than Labor itself. The parliamentary faction was renamed to reflect this on 7 October 1991.) | Social democracy | אמת | Yitzhak Rabin | 30.0% | 39 / 120 | 38 / 120 |
| Meretz | Progressivism; Secularism | — (Note: Would use מרצ as its symbol in the 1992 elections) | Shulamit Aloni; Yair Tzaban; Amnon Rubinstein | — | did not exist (Note: On 9 March 1992, Ratz, Mapam, and Shinui agreed to run on a common list in the 1992 elections. To ensure this, their respective parliamentary factions all merged into one on the same day.) | 10 / 120 |
| Shas | Religious conservatism Populism | שס | Aryeh Deri | 4.7% | 6 / 120 | 5 / 120 |
| Agudat Yisrael | Religious conservatism | ג | Moshe Ze'ev Feldman | 4.5% | 5 / 120 | 4 / 120 |
| Ratz | Progressivism; Secularism | רצ | Shulamit Aloni | 4.3% | 5 / 120 | no longer existed |
| Mafdal | Religious Zionism | ב | Avner Shaki | 3.9% | 5 / 120 | 5 / 120 |
| Hadash | Communism; Socialism | ו | Meir Vilner | 3.7% | 4 / 120 | 4 / 120 |
| Tehiya | Ultranationalism; Revisionist Zionism | ת | Yuval Ne'eman; Geula Cohen | 3.1% | 3 / 120 | 3 / 120 |
| Mapam | Labor Zionism; Democratic socialism | מפם | Yair Tzaban | 2.5% | 3 / 120 | no longer existed |
| New Liberal Party | Liberalism | — (Note: Would use קן as its symbol in the 1992 elections) | Yitzhak Moda'i | — | did not exist (Note: The New Liberal Party was formed on 15 March 1990 by five Likud defectors, formerly members of the (old) Liberal Party, who were dissatisifed with the Likud's transformation from an electoral alliance between Herut and the Liberal Party into a unitary party. Two of them, Yosef Goldberg and Avraham Sharir, later defected back to the Likud.) | 3 / 120 |
| Tzomet | National conservatism Agrarianism | ץ | Rafael Eitan | 2.0% | 2 / 120 | 2 / 120 |
| Moledet | Ultranationalism | ט | Rehavam Ze'evi | 1.9% | 2 / 120 | 2 / 120 |
| Shinui | Liberalism; Centrism | הן | Amnon Rubinstein | 1.7% | 2 / 120 | no longer existed |
| Degel HaTorah | Religious conservatism | עץ | Avraham Ravitz | 1.5% | 2 / 120 | 2 / 120 |
| PLFP | Palestinian nationalism | פ | Mohammed Miari | 1.5% | 1 / 120 | 1 / 120 |
| Mada | Arab interests | עם | Abdulwahab Darawshe | 1.2% | 1 / 120 | 1 / 120 |
| Moria | Ultra-Orthodox interest | — | Yitzhak Peretz | — | did not exist (Note: Yitzhak Peretz was elected as an MK for Shas, but defected to form his own faction on 25 December 1990. In the 1992 elections, he ran on the Agudat Yisrael list.) | 1 / 120 |
| Geulat Yisrael | Mizrahi ultra-Orthodox interest | — (Note: Would use קל as its symbol in the 1992 elections) | Eliezer Mizrahi | — | did not exist (Note: Eliezer Mizrahi was elected as an MK for Agudat Yisrael, but defected to form his own faction in 1990.) | 1 / 120 |

== Campaign period ==
=== Campaign slogans ===
| Party or alliance | Original slogan | English translation |
|---|---|---|
| Likud | "הליכוד-זה נכון!" | "Likud - that's right!" |
| Labor | "ישראל מחכה לרבין" | "Israel is waiting for Rabin" |
| Meretz | "ממשלה עם מרצ, הכוח לעשות את השינוי." | "A government with Meretz [energy], the power to make the change [Shinui]" |
| Meretz | "צריך מרצ, והרבה." | "We need Meretz [energy], and a lot of it." |
| Mafdal | "המפד"ל לימינך" | "Mafdal stands by you [lit. to your right]" |
| UTJ | "כולנו עם ג'" | "We are all with [ballot] Gimel" |
| Hadash | "שמאל זה חד"ש" | "The left is Hadash" |
| Tzomet | "ישראל בטוחה בצומת" | "Israel is safe with Tzomet" |
| Tehiya | "התחייה-יש ימין אמין!" | "Tehiya - there is a reliable right!" |

== Opinion polls ==
The Israel Broadcasting Authority separated the parties into two blocs:

- Left-wing:
  - Jewish: Alignment, Meretz (Ratz, Mapam, Shinui)
  - Arab: Hadash, PLP, Mada
- Right-wing:
  - Secular: Likud, Tehiya, Tzomet, Moledet
  - Religious: UTJ, Shas, Degel HaTorah

=== Seat projections ===
Note: Political blocs do not necessarily determine the exact makeup of post-election coalitions.

| Date | Poll client | Likud | Alignment/Labor | Meretz | | | Tehiya | Tzomet | Moledet | Hadash | PLP | Mada | Shas | Mafdal | UTJ | | Others | Lead | Left | Right | Lead |
| Date | Poll client | Likud | Alignment/Labor | Ratz | Mapam | Shinui | Tehiya | Tzomet | Moledet | Hadash | PLP | Mada | Shas | Mafdal | Agudat Yisrael | Degel | Others | Lead | Left | Right | Lead |
|---|---|---|---|---|---|---|---|---|---|---|---|---|---|---|---|---|---|---|---|---|---|
| Final results | | 32 | 44 | 12 | | | 0 | 8 | 3 | 3 | 0 | 2 | 6 | 6 | 4 | | 0 | 12 | 61 | 59 | 2 |
| Exit poll on Channel 1 | | 33 | 47 | 13 | | | 0 | 6 | 3 | 2 | 0 | 2 | 5 | 5 | 4 | | 0 | 14 | 64 | 56 | 8 |
| 19 June 1992 | Hadashot | 38 | 40 | 11 | | | 3 | 5 | 4 | 6 | | | 4 | 4 | 5 | | 0 | 2 | 57 | 63 | 6 |
| 14 June 1992 | Hadashot | 36 | 41 | 11 | | | 4 | 5 | 4 | 6 | | | 4 | 4 | 4 | | 0 | 5 | 58 | 62 | 4 |
| 8 June 1992 | Hadashot | 34 | 43 | 11 | | | 11 | | | 6 | | | 15 | | | | 0 | 9 | 60 | 60 | Tie |
| 1 June 1992 | Hadashot | 33 | 45 | 10 | | | 4 | 4 | 3 | 6 | | | 4 | 5 | 6 | | 0 | 12 | 61 | 59 | 2 |
| 'mid-late' May 1992 | Hadashot | 35 | 42 | 9 | | | 3 | 4 | 5 | 6 | | | 4 | 5 | 7 | | 1 | 7 | 57 | 62 | 5 |
| 15 May 1992 | Hadashot | 32 | 46 | 9 | | | 11 | | | 6 | | | 14 | | | | 0 | 14 | 63 | 57 | 6 |
| 'early' May 1992 | Hadashot | 33 | 43 | 9 | | | 3 | 6 | 3 | 6 | | | 5 | 4 | 7 | | 1 | 10 | 58 | 61 | 3 |
| 'late' April 1992 | Hadashot | 31 | 46 | 9 | | | 3 | 5 | 4 | 6 | | | 5 | 4 | 6 | | 0 | 15 | 61 | 59 | 2 |
| February 1992 | Hadashot | 35 | 36 | 15 | | | 4 | 4 | 4 | 6 | | | 4 | 5 | 5 | 2 | 0 | 1 | 57 | 63 | 6 |
| January 1992 | Hadashot | 35 | 32 | 15 | | | 3 | 5 | 5 | 6 | | | 5 | 6 | 6 | 2 | 0 | 3 | 53 | 67 | 14 |
| November 1991 | Hadashot | 44 | 29 | 15 | | | 4 | 4 | 3 | 6 | | | 4 | 4 | 6 | 1 | 0 | 15 | 50 | 70 | 20 |
| 4-12 November 1991 | Smith Research Institute (Note: Intentions given in percentages. Only Jewish voters were surveyed, and the calculation of seats assumes the Arab turnout and vote pattern was the same as 1988, and that surplus vote agreements were signed between Labor and Ratz-Mapam, with those two constituting an internal surplus agreement, Likud and Tzomet, and Tehiya and Moledet, the latter two being the cases in the election. This calculation assumes that Arab turnout equates to 10% of all votes, as was the case in 1988, and asides from the results indicated in the poll, Hadash would win 5 seats thanks to Arab voters, Labor and the PLP 2 each, and Ratz and Likud 1 each. It also assumes that Mada wins 1.01% of votes and fails to cross the threshold.) | 41 | 26 | 9 | 2 | N/A | 3 | 4 | 4 | 5 | 2 | 1 | N/A | N/A | N/A | N/A | 23 | 14 | N/A | N/A | N/A |
| 6 September 1991 | Smith Research Institute | 41 | 29 | 9 | 2 | 3 | 4 | 4 | 5 | N/A | N/A | N/A | N/A | N/A | N/A | N/A | 23 | 12 | N/A | N/A | N/A |
| August 1991 | Hadashot | 38 | 33 | 12 | | | 4 | 4 | 5 | 6 | | | 5 | 5 | 6 | 2 | 0 | 5 | 51 | 69 | 18 |
| 31 July 1991 | Ma'ariv | 32 | 30 | 10 | | | 11 | | | N/A | N/A | N/A | 16 | | | | 9 | 2 | N/A | N/A | N/A |
| January 1990 | Hadashot | 38 | 33 | 7 | 4 | 1 | 5 | 3 | 4 | 6 | | | 6 | 5 | 6 | 2 | 0 | 5 | 51 | 69 | 18 |
| December 1989 | Hadashot | 39 | 34 | 7 | 4 | 1 | 5 | 3 | 4 | 6 | | | 5 | 5 | 5 | 2 | 0 | 5 | 52 | 68 | 16 |
| November 1989 | Hadashot | 40 | 32 | 7 | 4 | 1 | 4 | 4 | 5 | 6 | | | 5 | 5 | 5 | 2 | 0 | 8 | 50 | 70 | 20 |
| Outgoing Knesset | | 38 | 38 | 10 | | | 3 | 2 | 2 | 4 | 1 | 1 | 5 | 5 | 4 | 2 | 2 | 0 | 56 | 64 | 6 |
| 1988 results | | 40 | 39 | 5 | 3 | 2 | 3 | 2 | 2 | 4 | 1 | 1 | 6 | 5 | 5 | 2 | 0 | 5 | 56 | 64 | 6 |

== Results ==
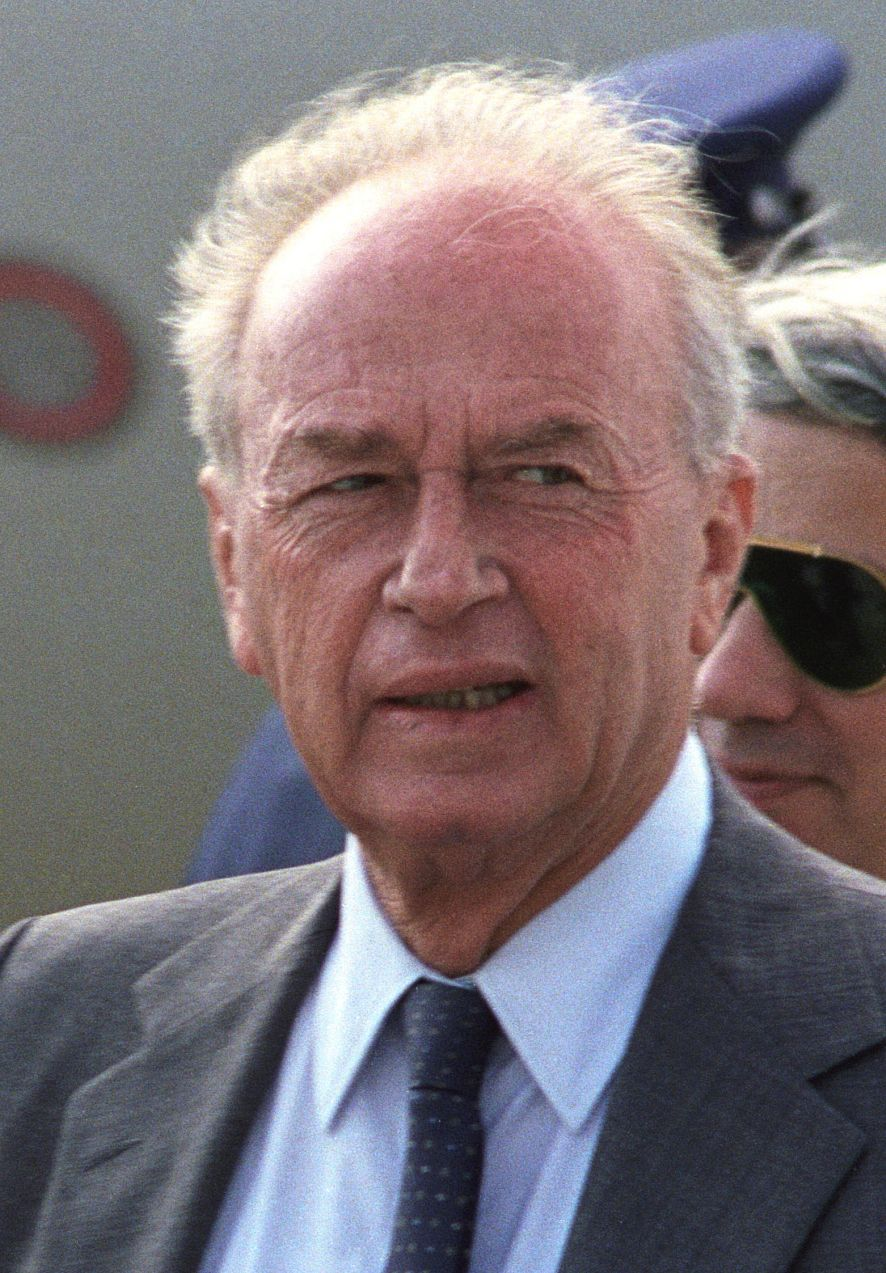
The Labor Party chairman Yitzhak Rabin. After winning the 1992 elections, Rabin managed to form the first Labor-led government in 6 years, supported by a coalition with Meretz, a left-wing party, and Shas, a Mizrahi ultra-orthodox religious party.

| Party | Votes | % | Seats | +/– |
|---|---|---|---|---|
| Labor Party | 906,810 | 34.65 | 44 | +5 |
| Likud | 651,229 | 24.89 | 32 | −8 |
| Meretz | 250,667 | 9.58 | 12 | +2 |
| Tzomet | 166,366 | 6.36 | 8 | +6 |
| National Religious Party | 129,663 | 4.95 | 6 | +1 |
| Shas | 129,347 | 4.94 | 6 | 0 |
| United Torah Judaism | 86,167 | 3.29 | 4 | −3 |
| Hadash | 62,546 | 2.39 | 3 | −1 |
| Moledet | 62,269 | 2.38 | 3 | +1 |
| Arab Democratic Party | 40,788 | 1.56 | 2 | +1 |
| Tehiya | 31,957 | 1.22 | 0 | −3 |
| Progressive List for Peace | 24,181 | 0.92 | 0 | −1 |
| New Liberal Party | 16,669 | 0.64 | 0 | New |
| Geulat Yisrael | 12,851 | 0.49 | 0 | New |
| Da | 11,697 | 0.45 | 0 | New |
| Pensioners, Immigrants and Senior Citizens | 8,327 | 0.32 | 0 | New |
| Movement of Mortgage Victims, the Homeless and Veterans | 5,962 | 0.23 | 0 | 0 |
| Pikanti | 3,750 | 0.14 | 0 | New |
| Torah VeAretz | 3,708 | 0.14 | 0 | New |
| On Wheels | 3,355 | 0.13 | 0 | New |
| Women's Party | 2,886 | 0.11 | 0 | New |
| Hatikva | 2,053 | 0.08 | 0 | New |
| Natural Law Party | 1,734 | 0.07 | 0 | New |
| Tali | 1,336 | 0.05 | 0 | New |
| Tzipor | 523 | 0.02 | 0 | New |
| Total | 2,616,841 | 100.00 | 120 | 0 |
| Valid votes | 2,616,841 | 99.20 | | |
| Invalid/blank votes | 21,102 | 0.80 | | |
| Total votes | 2,637,943 | 100.00 | | |
| Registered voters/turnout | 3,409,015 | 77.38 | | |
Source: IDI, Nohlen et al.

== Aftermath ==
Labor's Yitzhak Rabin formed the twenty-fifth government on 13 July 1992, including Meretz and Shas in his coalition, which had 17 ministers. Hadash and the Arab Democratic Party also supported the government despite not being coalition members. Shas left the coalition in September 1993, and Yiud joined in January 1995.

Coverage of the election night dubbed Labor's victory another 'Mahapach' (Hebrew: מהפך, lit. 'upheaval'), a term used to describe the Likud's first victory in 1977. The election marked a new age in Israeli politics in other senses. Political parties that had been mainstays in the Knesset in the 1980s were eliminated and subsequently disappeared. The Progressive List for Peace suffered a second mass exodus of members after 1992, with some eventually forming the Balad party. Tehiya, who were riding a polling surge in the mid-1980s, blamed its loss on 'personality-driven' parties on the right, with the leader Geulah Cohen singling out Tehiya's former ally Tzomet. Tehiya would have won a seat if the election threshold was not raised to 1.5%, a policy that the party ironically supported. The party disappeared.

Tzomet had a brief period of success, with its leader Rafael "Raful" Eitan claiming he was ready to negotiate with both left and right blocs, due to his party's ideologies of both secularism (which had been Meretz's main campaign point) and nationalism. His image as a veteran was well respected, but the MKs he brought with him were inexperienced and did not follow his party line, with many raising allegations that Raful was behaving 'tyrannically'. By the end of the Knesset term, Tzomet only had two MKs out of its original eight.

The Knesset term saw several defections; two MKs left the Labor Party to establish the Third Way, whilst Nava Arad also left the party. Two MKs left Likud to establish Gesher, whilst Efraim Gur also left the party. Three MKs left Tzomet to establish Yiud; one MK then left Yiud to establish Atid. Yosef Azran left Shas. One MK left Moledet to establish Yamin Yisrael, whilst Yosef Ba-Gad also left the party to sit as in independent. United Torah Judaism split into Agudat Yisrael (two seats) and Degel HaTorah (two seats), but it would reunify in time for the next election.

Rabin's government advanced the peace process to unprecedented levels; the Oslo Accords were signed with Yasser Arafat's PLO in 1993 and the Israel–Jordan peace treaty in 1994. The government's willingness to make peace with Syria and concede the Golan Heights led to Avigdor Kahalani and Emanuel Zisman leaving the party to form the Third Way.

The government also continued sweeping reforms of the previously socialised economy, which had been set up by Labour's forerunners. Measures were enacted to privatise more public assets and to attract foreign capital. Meanwhile, a new national health insurance was introduced, ending the old Histadrut-dominated insurance system. Healthcare and education spending were increased.

After Rabin's assassination on 4 November 1995, Shimon Peres took over as Prime Minister and formed a new government on 22 November 1995. His coalition was the same as before; Labor, Meretz and Yiud. Peres called early elections in 1996 in order to seek a mandate to continue the peace process, in which he lost.

== See also ==
- Party lists for the 1992 Israeli legislative election
- 1992 Israeli Labor Party leadership election
- 1992 Israeli Labor Party primary
- 1992 Likud leadership election
