= Mayoral elections in Tel Aviv =

Elections are held in Tel Aviv to elect the city's mayor. Currently, such elections are regularly scheduled to elect mayors to five-year terms.

Prior to 1978, mayors were selected by a vote of the city council. Since 1978, direct elections have been held for mayor.

== 1978 ==
The 1978 Tel Aviv mayoral election was held on 8, November 1978, and saw the reelection of Shlomo Lahat.

1978 Tel Aviv mayoral elections results
Candidate	Party	Votes	%
Shlomo Lahat (incumbent)	Likud	85,092	58.36
Asher Ben-Natan	Alignment	43,025	29.51
Haim Menachem Besuk	United Religious Front	12,093	8.30
Yitzhak Artzi	Independent Liberals	5,579	3.83
Total		145,789	100

== 1983 ==
The 1983 Tel Aviv mayoral election saw the reelection of Shlomo Lahat to a third consecutive term.

== 1989 ==
The 1989 Tel Aviv mayoral election was held on 28 February 1989, and saw the reelection of Shlomo Lahat to a fourth consecutive term.

1989 Tel Aviv mayoral elections results
Candidate	Party	Votes	%
Shlomo Lahat (incumbent)	Likud	70,052	55.3
Natan Wolloch	Labor	24,254	19.1
Mordechai Yitzhari	United Religious Front	11,898	9.4
Mordechai Virshubski	Ratz	7,205	5.7
Aryeh Zucker	Mapam	6,192	4.9
Yitzhak Artzi	Independent Liberals	4,476	3.5
Yair Rotlevy	Shinui	2,600	2.1
Total		126,677	100

== 1993 ==
The 1993 Tel Aviv mayoral election was held on 2 November 1993, and saw the election of Roni Milo.

1993 Tel Aviv mayoral elections results
Candidate	Party	Votes	%
Roni Milo	I am a Tel Avivi	62,553	47.15
Avigdor Kahalani	Labor	56,383	42.50
Mordechai Yitzhari	United Religious Front	8,959	6.75
Mordechai Virshubski	Meretz	4,769	3.60
Total		132,664	100

== 1998 ==
The 1998 Tel Aviv mayoral election was held on 10 November 1998, and saw the election of Ron Huldai.

Incumbent mayor Roni Milo had opted against seeking reelection, instead planning to run for prime minister in 2000 as the head of a new centrist political party.

Huldai had been the principal of Herzliya Hebrew Gymnasium. Huldai ran as an independent candidate with the support of the Israeli Labor Party. Huldai was regarded to be a political liberal. His opponents included former general Doron Rubin and actor Samuel Vilozny.

Huldai was considered the front-runner during the campaign.

The campaign of Doron Rubin never received much momentum.

There were instances of electoral violence during the campaign. Instances included a switchboard serving Huldai's campaign office was set on fire, a firebomb being tossed at one of the mayoral candidates homes, and a car belonging to a volunteer for one of the campaigns being set on fire.

Huldai's victory was regarded to be a landslide.

1998 Tel Aviv mayoral elections results
Candidate	Candidate	Votes	%
Ron Huldai	One Tel Aviv	66,701	50.25
Doron Rubin	Doron for Tel Aviv	32,917	25.19
Samuel Vilozny	Samuel Vilozny - Our City	17,655	13.51
Naftali Lobert	United Torah Judaism	7,888	6.04
Dan Darin-Dravkin	Lev - Dan Darin's list	3,282	2.51
Yehudit Arad	Tel Aviv elects residents	2,385	1.83
Arieh Chertok	Tel Aviv 2000	837	0.64
Total		130,665	100

== 2003 ==
The 2003 Tel Aviv mayoral election was held on 28 October 2003, and saw the reelection of Ron Huldai. Huldai won 55,966 votes (62.91% of the vote) against 5 opponents.

2003 Tel Aviv mayoral elections results
Candidate	Party	Votes	%
Ron Huldai (incumbent)	One Tel Aviv	55,966	62.91
Arnon Giladi	Likud	11,507	12.93
Pe'er Visner	The Greens	8,531	9.59
Gila Hertz	Gila Hertz-Public Right	7,082	7.96
Israel Meir Godovich	Godovich is good for Tel Aviv	5,864	6.59
Naftali Lobert	United Religious Front	11	0.01
Total		88,961	100

== 2008 ==
The 2008 Tel Aviv mayoral election was held on 11 November 2008, and saw the reelection of Ron Huldai to a third consecutive term. Huldai won 51% of the vote.

=== Candidates ===
- Ron Huldai, incumbent mayor since 1998
- Dov Khenin (City for All), member of the Knesset
- Oren Shahor, retired general
- Pe'er Visner, chair of The Greens and 2003 mayoral candidate
- Asma Agbaria Zahalka

=== Campaigning ===
Huldai was considered the election's front-runner. However, he faced criticisms accusing him of failing to address the demand for affordable housing in the city. and alleging that development in the city during his mayoralty had been beneficial only to the city's wealthy.

Runner-up Dov Khenin, a member of the Knesset who ran on a social and environmental issues-focused platform, won 34% of the vote. Khenin, running under the "City for All" party label, was also affiliated with Hadash.

One of the top issues discussed during the election included growing demand for parking spaces in the city, which outweighed the supply.

=== Results ===
2008 Tel Aviv mayoral elections results
Candidate	Party	Votes	%
Ron Huldai (incumbent)	One Tel Aviv	67,704	50.08
Dov Khenin	City of All	45,737	34.30
Shachor Svi-Oren	Oren	13,974	10.48
Pe'er Visner	Green Party	5,345	4.01
Asma Agbaria-Zahalka	Da'am	584	0.04
Total		133,344	100

== 2013 ==
The 2013 Tel Aviv mayoral election was held 22 October 2013, and saw the reelection of Ron Huldai to a fourth consecutive term.

2013 Tel Aviv mayoral elections results
Candidate	Party	Votes	%
Ron Huldai (incumbent)	One Tel Aviv	70,048	53.24
Nitzan Horowitz	Meretz	50,166	38.13
Aharon Maduel	City of All	11,368	8.64
Total		131,582	100

== 2018 ==
The 2018 Tel Aviv mayoral election was held on 30 October 2018 to elect the mayor of Tel Aviv. It saw the reelection of Ron Huldai to a fifth consecutive term.

The election was part of the 2018 Israeli municipal elections.

=== Candidates ===
- Natan Elnatan (Shas), deputy mayor
- Assaf Harel (We Are the City), comedian
- Ron Huldai (One Tel Aviv), incumbent mayor since 1998
- Asaf Zamir (City Majority), deputy mayor and founder and chairman of "City Majority"

=== Results ===
Since Huldai's share of the vote exceeded the 40% threshold required to avert a runoff election, no runoff was held.

Turnout was 44.17%

Candidate	Party name		Votes	%
Ron Huldai (incumbent)	One Tel Aviv	תל אביב 1, Tel Aviv Ahat	91,116	46.86
Asaf Zamir	City Majority	רוב העיר, Rov HaIr	66,403	34.15
Assaf Harel	We Are the City	אנחנו העיר, Anahnu HaIr	23,604	12.14
Natan Elnatan	Shas	ש"ס	13,328	6.85
Source: Ministry of the Interior

== 2024 ==
In 2024, Huldai was re-elected to a sixth term.

Candidate	Party	Votes	%
Ron Huldai	One Tel Aviv	95,578	51.67
Orna Barbivai	Yesh Atid	69,133	37.37
Yuval Zellner	New Hope	20,284	10.96
Total		184,995	100.00
Valid votes		184,995	93.72
Invalid/blank votes		12,406	6.28
Total votes		197,401	100.00
Registered voters/turnout		468,052	42.18
Source: Reshumot, timeout.co.il
