= Shlomo Lahat =

Israeli military officer and politician

- שלמה להט
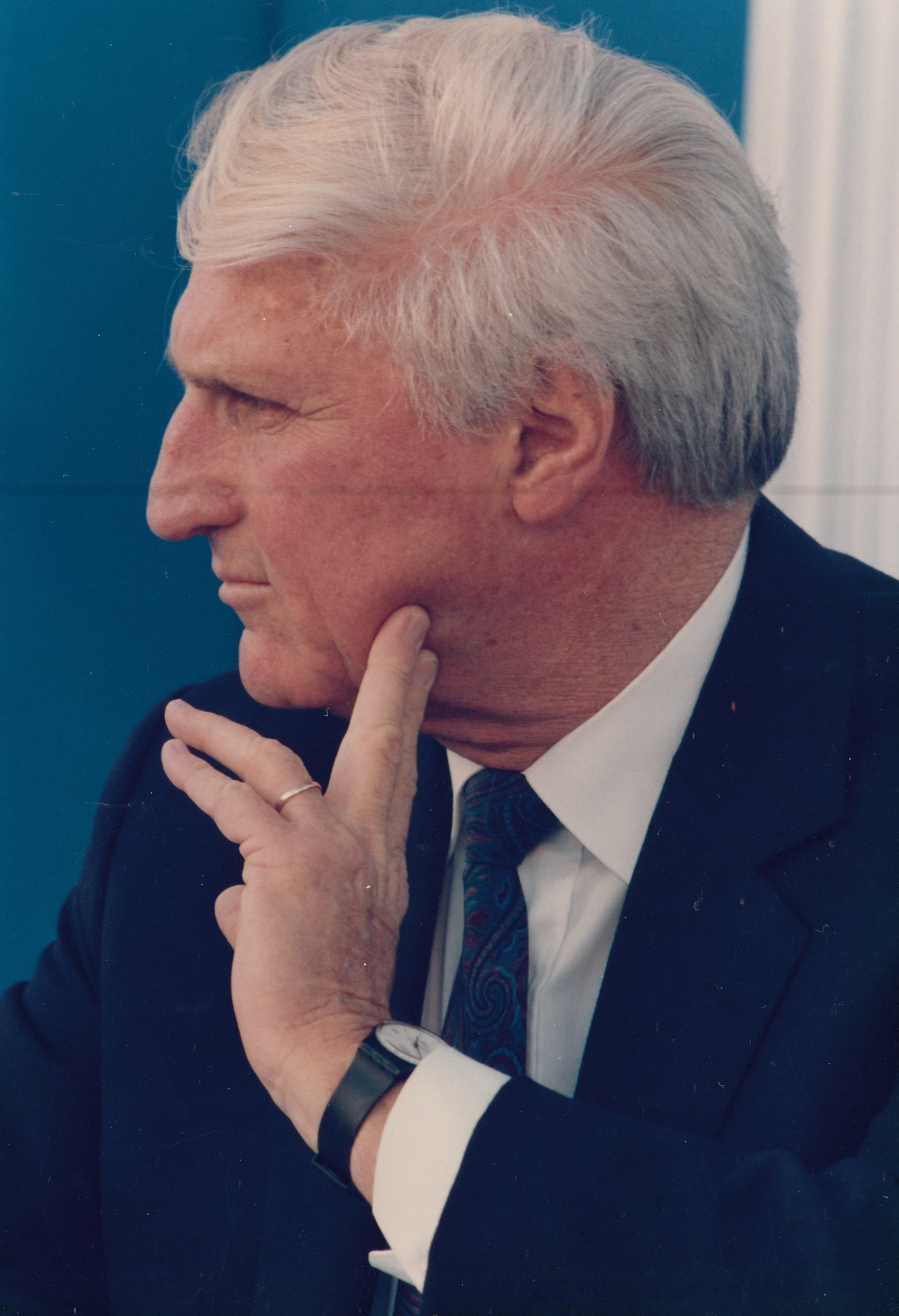
- Born: Salo Lindner; November 9, 1927; Berlin, Germany
- Died: October 1, 2014 (aged 86); Tel Aviv, Israel
- Military career
- Allegiance: Israel
- Branch: Haganah; Israel Defense Forces
- Service years: 1944-1973
- Rank: Aluf
- Nickname: Chich (or Cheech)
- Commands: 7th Armored Brigade; Heads of the Manpower Directorate, 1970–1973
- Wars: 1948 Arab–Israeli War; Sinai War; Six-Day War; War of Attrition
- Other work: Mayor of Tel Aviv, 1974-1993

Signature
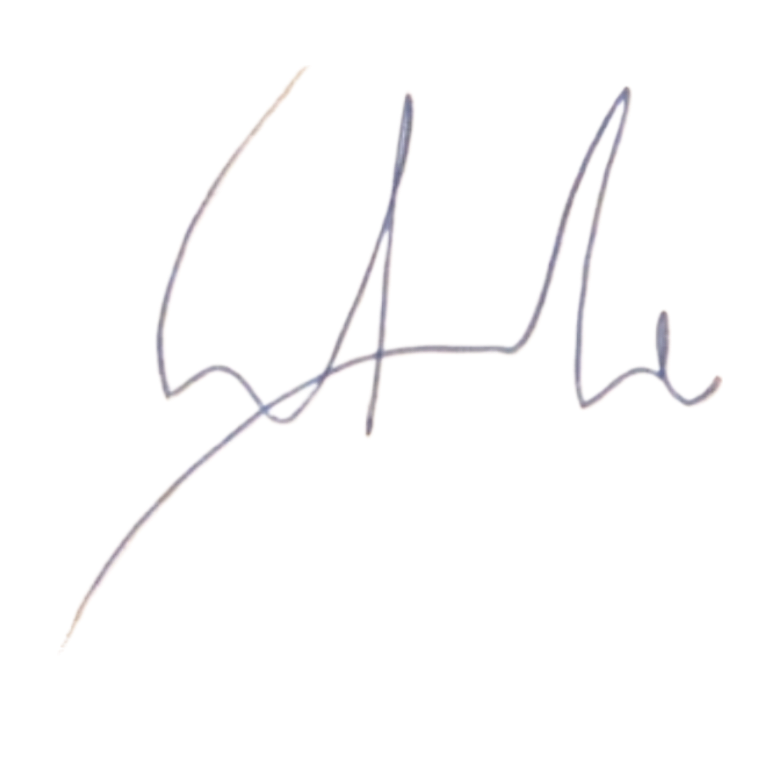

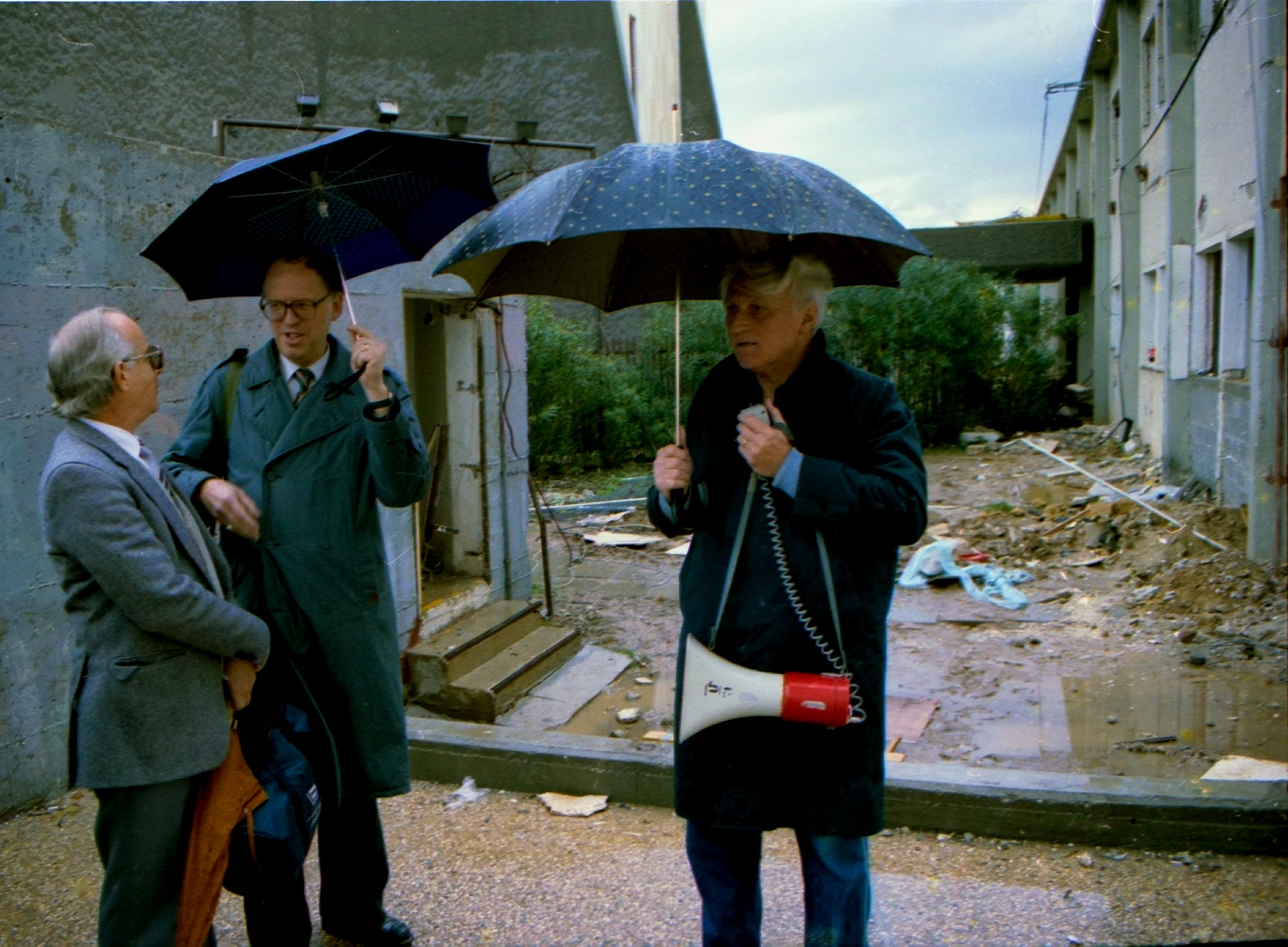
Shlomo Lahat (R), shows foreign visitors the impact of an Iraqi missile in Tel Aviv during the Gulf War, 1991.

Shlomo "Chich" Lahat (Hebrew: שלמה להט; November 9, 1927 – October 1, 2014) was a major general in the Israel Defense Forces and former Head of the Manpower Directorate. He served as the eighth mayor of Tel Aviv in 1974–1993, for four consecutive terms. After election on the Likud ticket in 1974, he was re-elected in 1978, 1983 and 1989. He coined the slogan about Tel Aviv being "the city that never stops."

== Early life and education ==
Shlomo Lindner (later Lahat) was born in Germany. He immigrated to Mandatory Palestine with his family in 1933 after the Nazis came to power. The family settled in Rehovot. Lahat's nickname “Cheech” dates back to when he played tug-of-war with his friends at the age of eight. “I would yell ‘zieh’ – ‘Pull’ (in German) – to my friends, and they made it into ‘Cheech,’ and it stuck with me to this day," he later recalled. Lahat was a member of the Hashomer Hatzair youth movement and attended Gymnasia Herzliya high school in Tel Aviv.

== Military and political career ==
Lahat served in the Haganah and then the Israel Defense Forces. During the 1948 Arab-Israeli War he served as an officer in the Givati Brigade, commanding a company in the battle for the Hulikat positions during Operation Yoav. While serving in the IDF, he studied law at Hebrew University of Jerusalem and attended the IDF's battalion commanders' school under Yitzhak Rabin. In 1956, he was the first Israeli officer to study at the U.S. Army Command and General Staff College at Fort Leavenworth, Kansas. Upon his return, he became an instructor at the IDF Command and Staff School. In 1959, he headed the Operations Branch of the General Staff Operations Department, transferring to the Armor Corps in 1962.

Following the Six-Day War in June 1967, Lahat was appointed military governor of East Jerusalem. In that capacity, together with his deputy Shmuel Elbek and Jerusalem mayor Teddy Kollek, he oversaw the demolition of the Mughrabi Quarter adjacent to the Western Wall to create the large prayer plaza used today. He then became head of the Central Command Staff with the rank of brigadier general. In April 1969, during the War of Attrition, he was appointed commander of the Sinai Division (the 252nd Division), and later commanded operations at the Suez Canal. In 1970–1973, he served as chief of the Manpower Directorate, retiring from the IDF in 1973 with the rank of major general (aluf).

In February 1974, he became the eighth mayor of Tel Aviv, continuing his tenure until November 1993, when he was succeeded by Roni Milo. He was elected mayor as a member of the Likud. As mayor, he was credited with developing Tel Aviv's coastline and boardwalk and turning the beachfront into a leisure hub; the city's seaside promenade was later named "Lahat Promenade" (Tayelet Lahat) in his honor during his lifetime. He also promoted neighborhood-renewal projects and, more controversially, a school-integration program, and was criticized for running budget deficits to fund large municipal projects; the city was left with significant debts when he left office.

=== Public activity after leaving office ===
After leaving the mayoralty, Lahat remained active in public life. In 1985 he co-founded the Center-Liberal Party together with journalist Yosef Lapid, stepping down from its leadership in 1986. He served as chairman of the "Knock on the Door" ("Hakesh Badelet") fundraising campaign of the Israel Cancer Association and was involved with the Yad Vashem foundation.

Lahat worked to advance the Israeli–Palestinian peace process and, on November 4, 1995, helped organize the Tel Aviv peace rally in support of the Oslo Accords at which Prime Minister Yitzhak Rabin was assassinated. In 2000 he published an open letter addressed to the late Rabin in which he said he blamed himself for having urged Rabin, who had been reluctant, to attend the rally. In 2003 he was among the signatories of the Geneva Initiative. In 2009 Lahat was honored as one of the torchbearers in the national Israeli Independence Day ceremony, in recognition of his contribution to Tel Aviv.

== Personal life ==
Lahat was married to Ziva, former director of the Humanities Library at Tel Aviv University; the couple were married for almost 59 years at the time of his death. They had two children, Dan and Avner. He is also survived by his eight grandchildren. His son, Dan Lahat, is a Tel Aviv city council member for the Yesh Atid party.

== Death ==
On September 30, 2014, Lahat was admitted to Ichilov Hospital in critical condition due to a lung infection. He died on the morning of October 1, 2014. At his eulogy, Tel Aviv mayor Ron Huldai said Lahat had turned the city into an international center of culture, art and business, while President Reuven Rivlin described him as one of the builders and shapers of Tel Aviv's binational, unified character as a city of culture and progress.
