= Akadma Conservatory =

- קונסרבטוריון אקדמא

Location
- 8 Derech Eretz Street, Zvi Zilker Campus; Monart Cultural Center; Ashdod; Israel

Information
- School type: Music school
- Established: 1966

Academa Conservatory Ashdod (Hebrew: קונסרבטוריון אקדמא אשדוד) is the municipal institution of Ashdod, Israel for learning to play various musical instruments, primarily intended for children and youth. The institution holds concerts, competitions, and workshops. The conservatory was founded in 1966, and since 2000 has been housed in the Monart Cultural Center in the Zvi Zilker Campus.

== History ==
The conservatory was established in 1966 in the Ashdod local council by Gideon Shamir, Naphtali Adler, Hanita Zwebner and Ricardo Futoransky.

The conservatory was initially established as an Ottoman association under the supervision of the Ministry of Education. The municipality of Ashdod under Mayor Zvi Zilker signed an agreement with Akadma to expand its activities, which allowed it to establish schools for music, ballet and movement, courses for children and orchestras. The agreement obligated Akadma to accept any student interested in learning music or art, provided they pass an entrance exam and under minimal tuition and with discounts matching the student's socio-economic situation from a scholarship fund for talented students of limited means that it established. The Akadma association, according to the same agreement, also established a municipal wind instrument orchestra of thirty musicians as well as a youth orchestra, with the musical instruments funded by the municipality for 45,000 ILP, which it raised from Amigur company. The municipality provided the young conservatory with buildings at its disposal for carrying out its activities free of charge.

In 1975 the Ashdod Youth Orchestra was established, as part of Akadma.

Initially, the conservatory was housed in the "Geulim" (Note: Hebrew: גאולים) school in Rova Alef (Quarter 1), and in 1986 it moved to the "Arazim" (Note: Hebrew: ארזים) school in Rova Dalet (Quarter 4). In 2000 it moved to a permanent location in the Monart Center.

== Activity ==
=== Departments ===
Name	Details	Musical Instruments
Wind Instruments	The department operates 3 wind instrument orchestras divided by playing level and age, and smaller ensembles.	Woodwind instruments: flute, clarinet, saxophone; Brass instruments: trumpet, French horn, trombone, baritone, tuba
String Instruments	The department operates a string orchestra and a chamber violin ensemble.	Violin and cello
Piano	The largest department in the conservatory. At the end of each academic year a "piano marathon" takes place – a series of concerts by all Academia pianists spread over several days.	
Voice Development	The department operates the "Zemirei HaYam" (Note: Hebrew: זמירי הים) choir divided into a young choir (ages 7–12) and an adult choir (ages 13–18).	Voice development studies in classical music, jazz, rock, pop and light music
Plucked Instruments		Guitar and mandolin
Percussion Instruments	Department students participate in the conservatory's orchestras and ensembles	Drum kit, xylophone, timpani, marimba
Multi-disciplinary Music	Studies of playing and singing in jazz and light music styles, improvisation, orchestration and computer production.	
Music Theory	Studies of theory and solfège in groups by playing levels and age.	
Early Childhood	A track for early childhood combining studies of musical language, hearing development, rhythm and musical memory.	

=== Projects ===
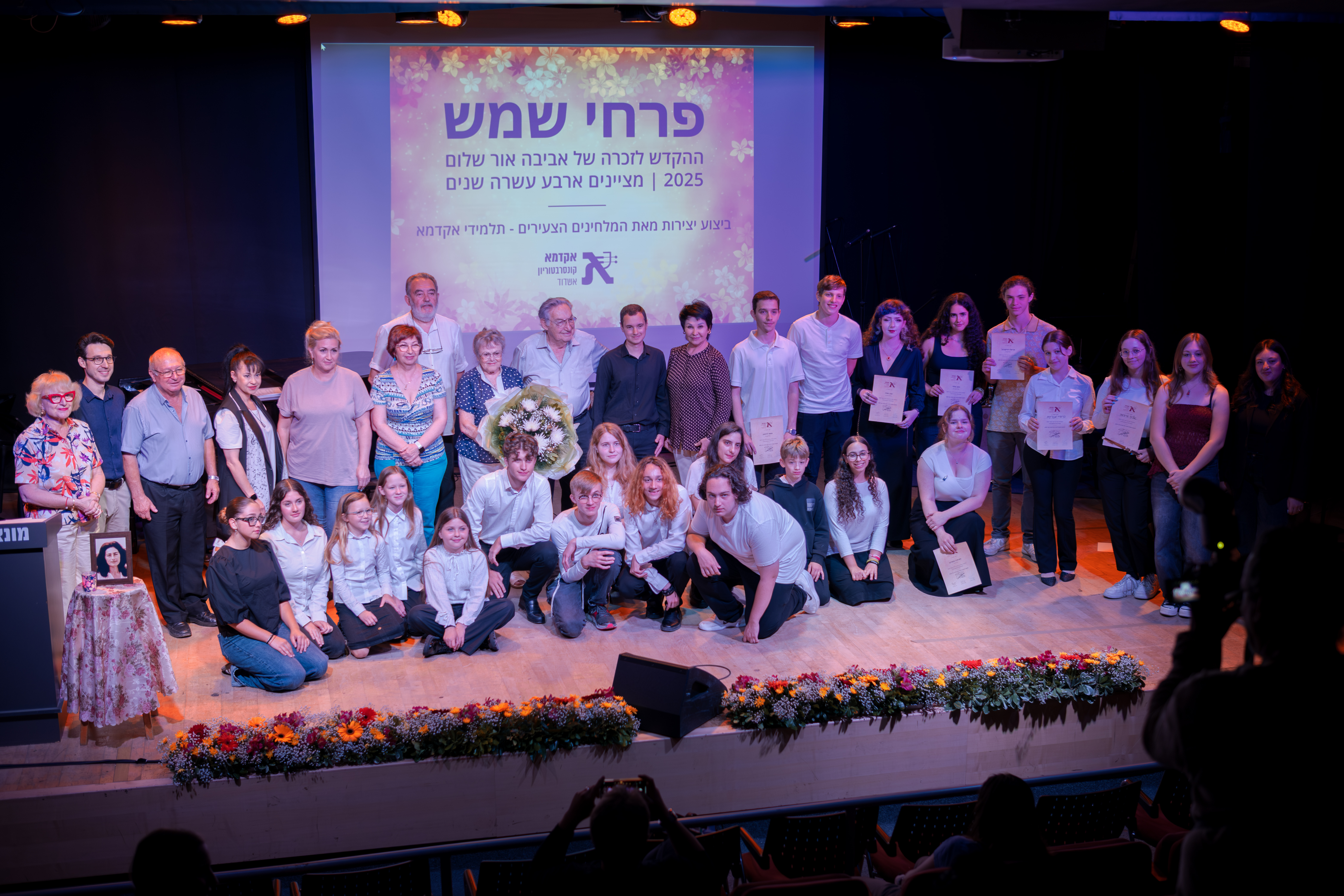
2025 Sun Flowers concert

==== Sun Flowers (Note: Hebrew: פרחי שמש) ====
Project for composition to commemorate Aviva Or Shalom and to support composition studies for students with outstanding talent in the field. As part of the project, students receive guidance in composing Or Shalom's songs, which are performed by Akadma ensembles. Outstanding students receive scholarships to continue composition studies. The project has been operating since 2011, and is funded by an endowment in memory of Or Shalom. The project is managed by Professor Nino Levy and his wife Sima.

==== Beit Sefer Menagen (Note: Hebrew: בית ספר מנגן) ====
Project for musical instrument studies in elementary schools in Ashdod city. As part of the project, students learn musical instruments in group lessons during the school day. The lessons are taught by teachers from the conservatory. At the end of the academic year, a graduation concert is held to mark the students' musical achievements. Additionally, interested students are offered the opportunity to continue their studies at the conservatory in the following academic year.

=== Competitions ===
- Piano Forever (Note: Hebrew: פסנתר לתמיד) – A national competition for young pianists organized by the conservatory together with the Monart Center and the local municipality since 2009. The purpose of the competition is to discover young talents (ages 6–28) in piano playing to nurture the next generations of pianists in the city.
- Wind Instruments Competition in Memory of Oz Israeli
