= 2018 Tel Aviv mayoral election =

- 30 October 2018
- Turnout: 44.17%
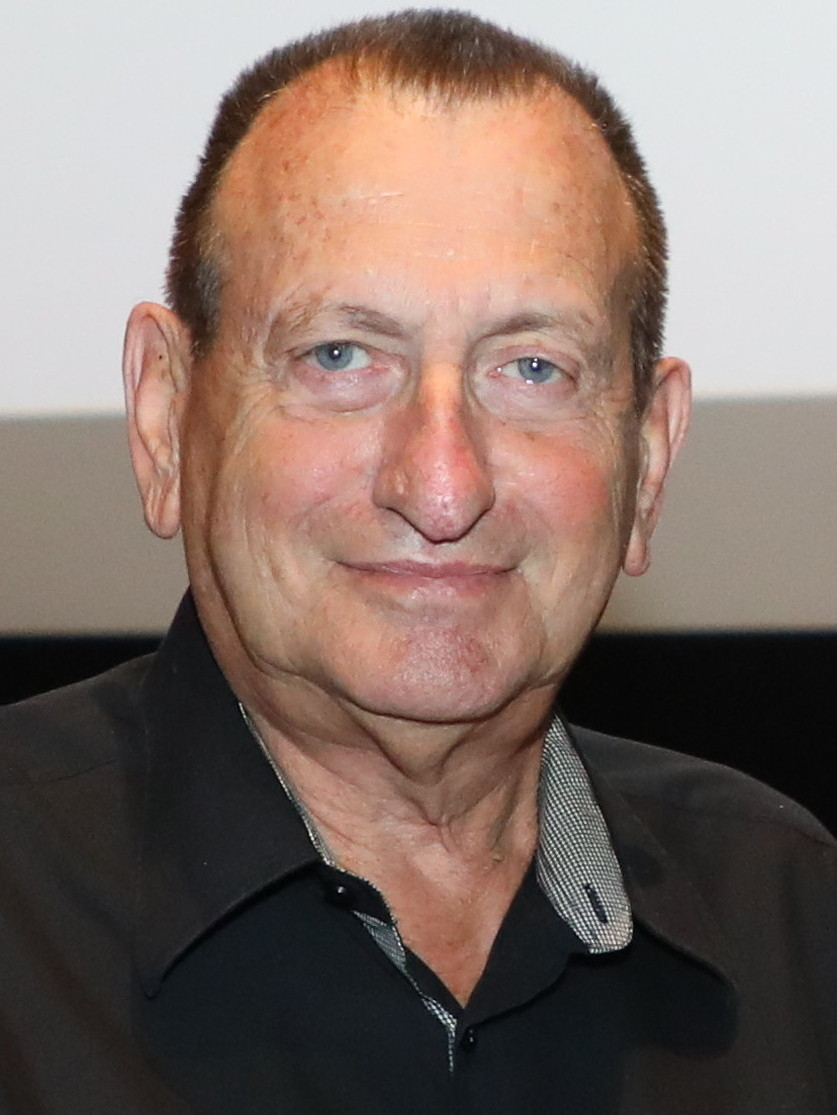

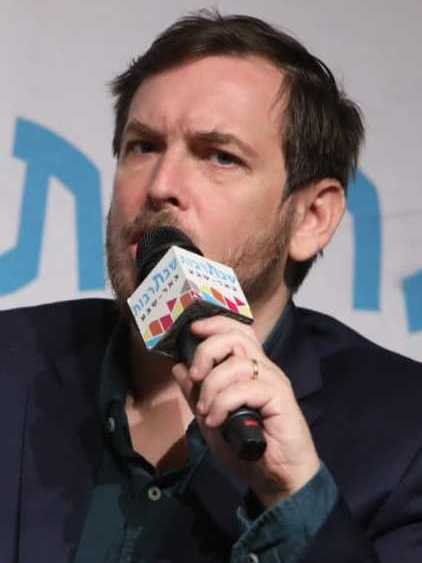

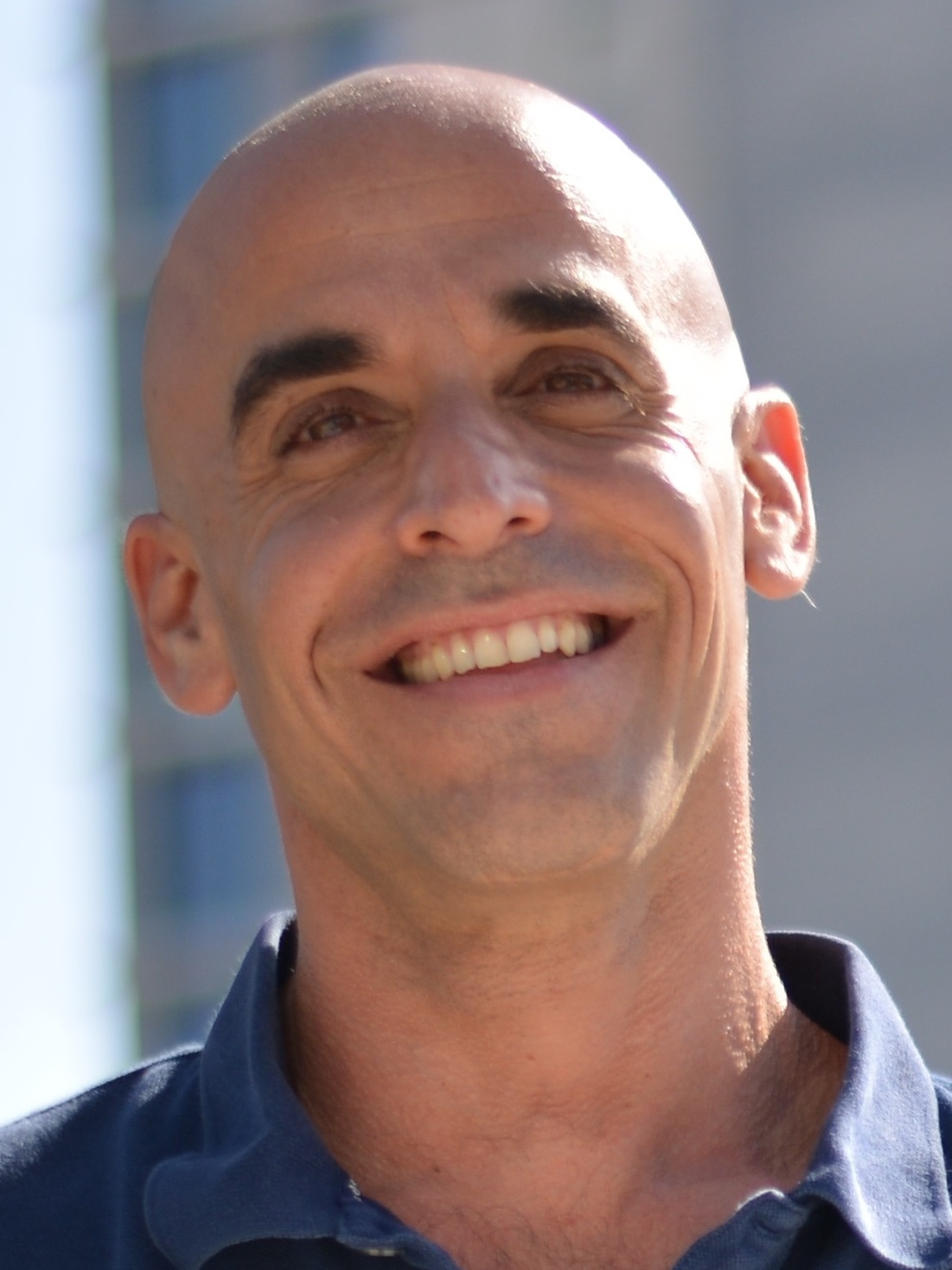

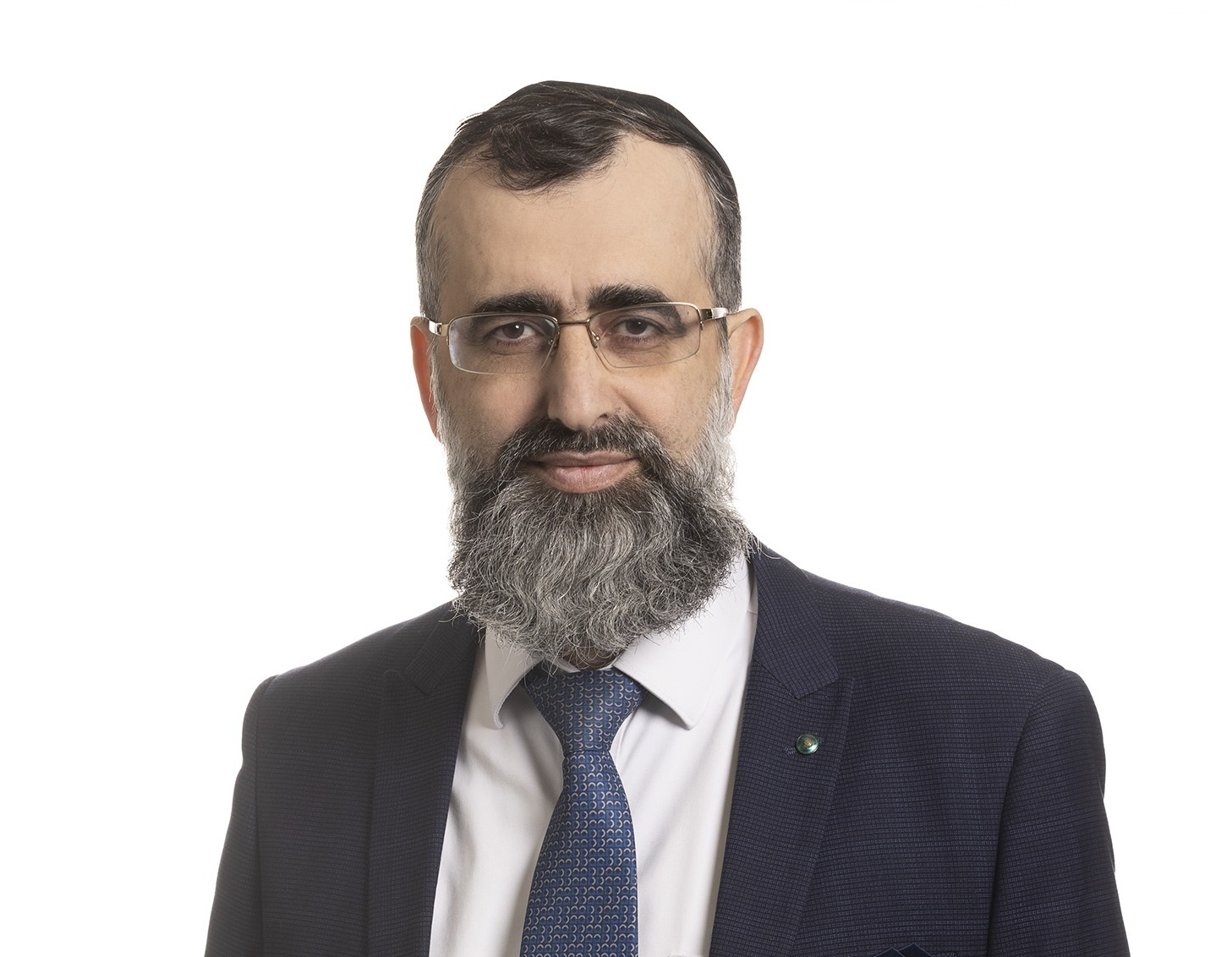
Candidate	Ron Huldai	Asaf Zamir
Party	One Tel Aviv	City Majority
Popular vote	91,116	66,403
Percentage	46.86%	34.15%
Candidate	Assaf Harel	Natan Elnatan
Party	We Are the City	Shas
Popular vote	23,604	13,328
Percentage	12.14%	6.85%
- Strongest candidate by borough
Mayor before election
Ron Huldai
One Tel Aviv
Elected mayor
Ron Huldai
One Tel Aviv

The 2018 Tel Aviv mayoral election was held on 30 October 2018 to elect the mayor of Tel Aviv. It saw the reelection of Ron Huldai to a fifth consecutive term.

The election was part of the 2018 Israeli municipal elections.

== Candidates ==
=== Ran ===
- Natan Elnatan (Shas), deputy mayor
- Assaf Harel (We Are the City), comedian
- Ron Huldai (One Tel Aviv), incumbent mayor since 1998
- Asaf Zamir (City Majority), deputy mayor and founder and chairman of "City Majority"

=== Declined ===
- Ofir Akunis, member of the Knesset
- Tzipi Livni, Knesset leader of the opposition, leader of Hatnua, former leader of Kadima
- Stav Shaffir, member of the Knesset
- Noam Tavon

== Campaigning ==
A popular four-term incumbent, Ron Huldai had never before faced a serious reelection challenge.

Lacking name recognition when he announced his candidacy, Asaf Zamir's prospects were initially considered a longshot. However, in the months after launching his campaign, Zamir saw his support rise. Before the election results came in, it was anticipated that he would at least force Huldai into a runoff election. As of July, a poll by Walla News showed Zamir in third place with only 11% of the vote, behind Huldai and prospective candidate Stav Shaffir. However, after Shaffir's made clear she would not be a candidate in the election, Zamir gradually climbed in support, posing a credible challenge to Huldai. Some polling shortly before the election showed Huldai with only a single-digit lead over Zamir.

Attacks on Zamir included accusations of crony capitalism related to his marriage to Maya Wertheimer, which made his grandfather-in-law billionaire Stef Wertheimer. Stef Wertheimer personally funded part of Zamir's reelection campaign.

Huldai and Zamir shared many similar political concerns, both advocating for lowering the price of housing, improvements to public transportation, and increasing the livability of the city.

Zamir promised to address housing needs by building the city vertically, adding high-rise apartments along busier roadways that can accommodate such buildings. He also proposed expanding the city center by renovating more distant neighborhoods in order to enable people to live further from the city's geographic core, without feeling removed from the city.

== Polling ==
Date	Polling firm	Sample Size	Margin of error	Vote share									
Date	Polling firm	Sample Size	Margin of error	Natan Elnatan	Zippi Brand Frank	Ron Huldai	Meital Leavi	Stav Shaffir	Yair Tzabari	Asaf Harel	Assaf Zamir	Undecided	Will not vote
Mid-October 2018	Panels Research Institute				-	27.6%	-	-	-	10.1%	23.9%		
October 2018	Panels Research Institute	505	±4.4%	6.0%	-	25.7%	-	-	-	7.3%	20.0%	35.3%	5.7%
Early October 2018	Panels Politix Research Institute/Walla News	513		7%	-	32%	-	-	-	9%	23%	29%	-
August 2018	Channel 2			-	2%	45%	1%	14%	-		10%	-	-
July 2018	Panels Politix Research Institute/Walla News			-	-	25%	4%	15%	3%	-	11%	40%	-

== Results ==
The results in Tel Aviv, with 203,018 voters participating of 440,205 eligible, are as follows. Of the 203,018 votes, 194,451 were valid (marking 44.17% turnout).

Since Huldai's share of the vote exceeded the 40% threshold required to avert a runoff election, no runoff was held.

Huldai was seen as managing to both retain his strong support among the city's younger electorate, as well as retain a base of fervent supporters among a minority of the city's older residents.

Candidate	Party name		Votes	%
Ron Huldai (incumbent)	One Tel Aviv	תל אביב 1, Tel Aviv Ahat	91,116	46.86%
Asaf Zamir	City Majority	רוב העיר, Rov HaIr	66,403	34.15%
Assaf Harel	We Are the City	אנחנו העיר, Anahnu HaIr	23,604	12.14%
Natan Elnatan	Shas	ש"ס	13,328	6.85%
Source: Ministry of the Interior
