= Mordechai Virshubski =

Israeli lawyer and politician (1930–2012)

Faction represented in the Knesset
- 1977–1978: Democratic Movement for Change
- 1978–1987: Shinui
- 1987–1992: Ratz
- 1992: Meretz

Personal details
- Born: 10 May 1930 Leipzig, Germany
- Died: 1 May 2012 (aged 81) Tel Aviv, Israel

Mordechai Virshuvski (Hebrew: מרדכי וירשובסקי; 10 May 1930 – 1 May 2012) was an Israeli lawyer and politician who served as a member of the Knesset (and as Deputy Speaker) for several parties between 1977 and 1992.

== Early life and education ==
Born in Leipzig in Germany, on 10 May 1930, Virshubski emigrated to Mandatory Palestine in 1939. He attended the Herzliya Hebrew High School in Tel Aviv, before going on to study law at the Hebrew University of Jerusalem, later being certified as a lawyer.

== Career ==
From 1955 until 1966 Virshubski worked as a legal advisor to Mekorot, before becoming Tel Aviv City Council's legal advisor, a job he held until 1977.

In 1974 he was amongst the founders of Shinui, and he was elected to the Knesset on the Democratic Movement for Change list (which Shinui was part of) in 1977. When the party split the following year, he stayed with the Shinui faction. He was re-elected in 1981 and 1984. On 5 August 1987 he left Shinui to join Ratz, and was re-elected on the Ratz list in 1988, after which he became a Deputy Speaker. He was a candidate in the 1989 Tel Aviv mayoral election, but finished fourth with 5.7% of the vote. He lost his Knesset seat in the 1992 elections, shortly after Ratz had formed the Meretz alliance with Shinui and Mapam. He ran for the Tel Aviv mayoralty again in 1993, but finished fourth with 3.6% of the vote. He subsequently served on Tel Aviv City Council as a member of Ratz and later of the Greens. In 1999, Virshubski ran for the Knesset as a member of the Power for Pensioners party, but was not elected as the party won no seats.

After retirement from electoral politics, he was a chairman for an umbrella organization of groups representing the disabled and was a board member of the Association of Israelis of Central European Origin.

== Personal life and death ==
Virshubski was married to Viola (née Israel), and together they had two children and five grandchildren.

He died on 1 May 2012.
