= Asaf Zamir =

Israeli politician

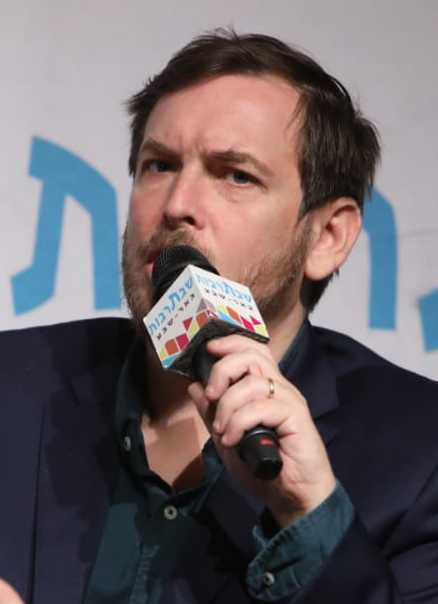
- Zamir in 2020

Ministerial roles
- 2020: Minister of Tourism

Faction represented in the Knesset
- 2019–2020: Blue and White
- 2020–2021: Blue and White

Other roles
- 2021–2023: Consul General in New York

Personal details
- Born: 31 August 1980 (age 45) Ganei Yehuda, Israel

Asaf Zamir (Hebrew: אסף זמיר; born 31 August 1980) is an Israeli politician, lawyer and diplomat. He served as Deputy Mayor of Tel Aviv from 2008 until 2013 and Acting Mayor in charge of education from 2013 to 2018. He was elected to the Knesset in 2019, serving in two spells until 2021. He also held the post of Minister of Tourism from May to October 2020. He was Consul General in New York from October 2021 until his resignation in March 2023, in protest at Prime Minister Binyamin Netanyahu's decision to fire Defense Minister Yoav Gallant.

== Biography ==
Zamir was born in Ganei Yehuda to Galia and Muki Zamir. His family lived in Sarasota, Florida in the United States for four years during his childhood. After they returned to Israel, he attended the A.D. Gordon school and Ironi Daled High School, and was a member of HaNoar HaOved VeHaLomed and the Hebrew Scouts. During his national service in the Israel Defense Forces he served in the central control unit of the Israeli Air Force. After graduating from Tel Aviv University with a law degree he interned with Naschitz Brandes Amir law firm and qualified as a lawyer.

Zamir is married to the actress Maya Wertheimer, a granddaughter of Stef Wertheimer. His uncle Yitzhak Zamir was a judge in the Supreme Court. The couple have 2 children.

== Political and diplomatic career ==
In the 2008 municipal elections he was elected to Tel Aviv city council as part of the Rov HaIr (Majority of the City) party that he co-founded. Mayor Ron Huldai subsequently appointed Zamir as his deputy, making him the youngest-ever person to hold such a post in Israel. He was re-elected in the 2013 elections, after which he became acting mayor with responsibility for education. In the 2018 Tel Aviv mayoral election, Zamir challenged Huldai for the mayoralty, losing by a margin of 47–34%.

Prior to the April 2019 elections he joined the Israel Resilience Party. After the party joined the Blue and White alliance, he was given the nineteenth slot on the joint list, and was subsequently elected to the Knesset as the alliance won 35 seats. He was re-elected in the September 2019 legislative election and March 2020 legislative election. In May 2020, he was appointed the Minister of Tourism in the thirty-fifth government of Israel led by Prime Minister Benjamin Netanyahu. He subsequently resigned from the Knesset under the Norwegian Law and was replaced by Einav Kabla. On 2 October 2020 he resigned from the government while criticizing Prime Minister Benjamin Netanyahu. He was not included in Blue and White's electoral list for the 2021 elections after his vote against a budget extension, which effectively caused the dissolution of the government.

In October 2021 he was appointed Consul General in New York. He resigned the position in March 2023 to protest proposed changes to Israel's judiciary and the planned firing of Defense Minister Yoav Gallant. On 28 August 2023, Zamir announced his intention to run alongside Ron Huldai in the 2023 Tel Aviv mayoral election. Following the elections, he was appointed as deputy mayor.
