= Chaim Levanon =

Israeli politician

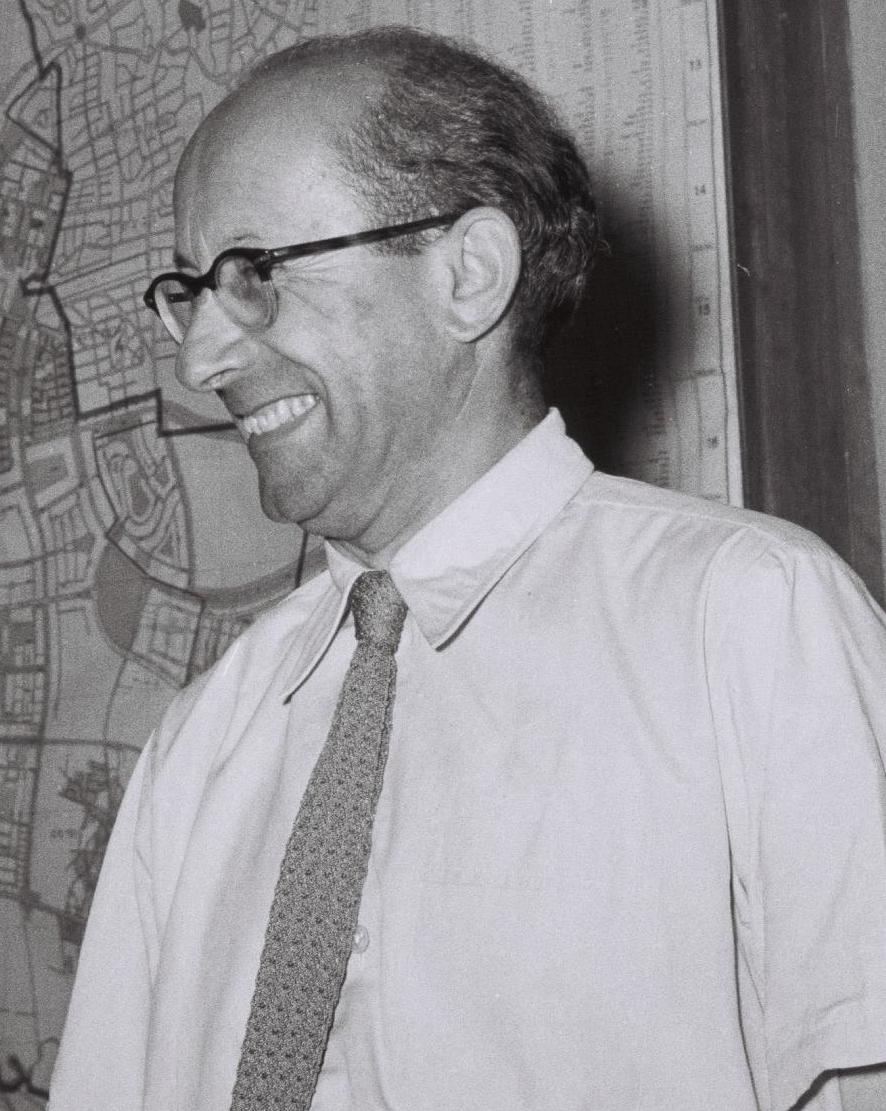

6th Mayor of Tel Aviv
- In office 1953–1959
- Preceded by: Israel Rokach
- Succeeded by: Mordechai Namir

Personal details
- Born: 25 March 1899 Kraków, Galicia
- Died: 21 August 1986 (aged 87) Tel Aviv, Israel
- Party: General Zionists

Chaim Levanon (Hebrew: חיים לבנון; 1899–1986) was a Polish-born Israeli politician and mayor of Tel Aviv between 13 April 1953 and 1959.

== Personal life ==
Levanon was born in Kraków, Poland, in 1899 as Chaim Yosef Levinstein. After graduating from a yeshiva, he studied agricultural engineering at the Jagiellonian University.

He made aliyah in 1927 and taught at the Ehad HaAm gymnasium in Petah Tikva. In 1928 he married Miriam Levit Shamrot.

== Political activity ==
Levanon was one of the founders of the General Zionists youth movement, and later one of its leaders. He also founded and headed the Civilian Housing organization. In 1936 he served as the chairman of the election committee in Tel Aviv and the secretary-general of the General Zionists' labor union.

In 1951 he was elected to Tel Aviv's city council and served as the deputy mayor from 1952. Israel Rokach's resignation and ministerial appointment got him elected mayor by the city council on 13 April 1953. In 1955, Levanon was publicly re-elected into office.

== Legacy ==
Levanon was the main founder of the Tel Aviv University, which he helped advance even after his mayoral tenure. One of its main streets was named after him after his death.
