= Zvi Zilker =

Israeli politician (1933–2021)

- צבי צילקר

4th and 6th mayor of Ashdod
- In office 1969–1983
- Preceded by: Avner Garin
- Succeeded by: Aryeh Azulai
- In office 1989–2008
- Preceded by: Aryeh Azulai
- Succeeded by: Yehiel Lasri

Personal details
- Born: 13 March 1933 Güstrow, Mecklenburg-Schwerin, Germany
- Died: 18 November 2021 (aged 88) Ashdod, Israel
- Party: Kadima

Zvi Zilker (Hebrew: צבי צילקר; 13 March 1933 – 18 November 2021) was an Israeli politician who served as the fourth and sixth mayor of Ashdod.

== Background ==
Zilker was born in Güstrow, Mecklenburg-Schwerin, Germany, in March 1933, to a German Jewish family, and immigrated to Mandatory Palestine with his family in 1935 at age two.

He did his national military service in the Israel Defense Forces as the commander of an anti-aircraft battery in the Israeli Air Force, and completed his service with the rank of lieutenant colonel. He earned a bachelor's degree in civil engineering and a master's degree with specialization in planning systems from the Technion – Israel Institute of Technology. He studied for a doctorate from the Hebrew University of Jerusalem for three years, but did not complete it.

== Career ==
Zilker worked for two years as an engineer for the Ministry of Housing, and another two years as an engineer for the municipality of Beit Shemesh. From 1962 to 1968, he served as a city engineer for Ashdod. He was elected mayor of Ashdod in 1969, and served in this position until 1983, when he was replaced by Aryeh Azulai. During his tenure, Ashdod was divided into autonomous areas which could act independently. From 1978 to 1983, he was also Chairman of the Local Authorities in the country's center. During his career, he also served as Chairman of the Finance Committee of the Union of Local Authorities, and a member of the Ports and Railways Council. In 1984, he was appointed Director-General of the Ministry of Communications, and from 1985 to 1986 he headed the Ministry of Labor and Social Affairs. In 1986 he was appointed Chairman of the Engineering and Architecture Council of Israel, and from 1987 to 1990 headed the Association of Contractors and Builders in Israel. In March 1989, he was again elected mayor of Ashdod, and served until 2008, when he was replaced by Yehiel Lasri. He ran for mayor again in 2013 but lost.

Ziker ran in Likud's internal Knesset primaries ahead of the 1996 general election. He was assigned the 39th slot on the party's joint list with Gesher and Tzomet and was not elected.

== Personal life ==
Zilker was married, and had three children. He died on 18 November 2021, at the age of 88.
