= Mayor of Tel Aviv =

Head of the executive branch of the government of Tel Aviv

Mayor of Tel Aviv-Yafo
- ראש עיריית תל אביב-יפו
- Emblem of Tel Aviv-Yafo

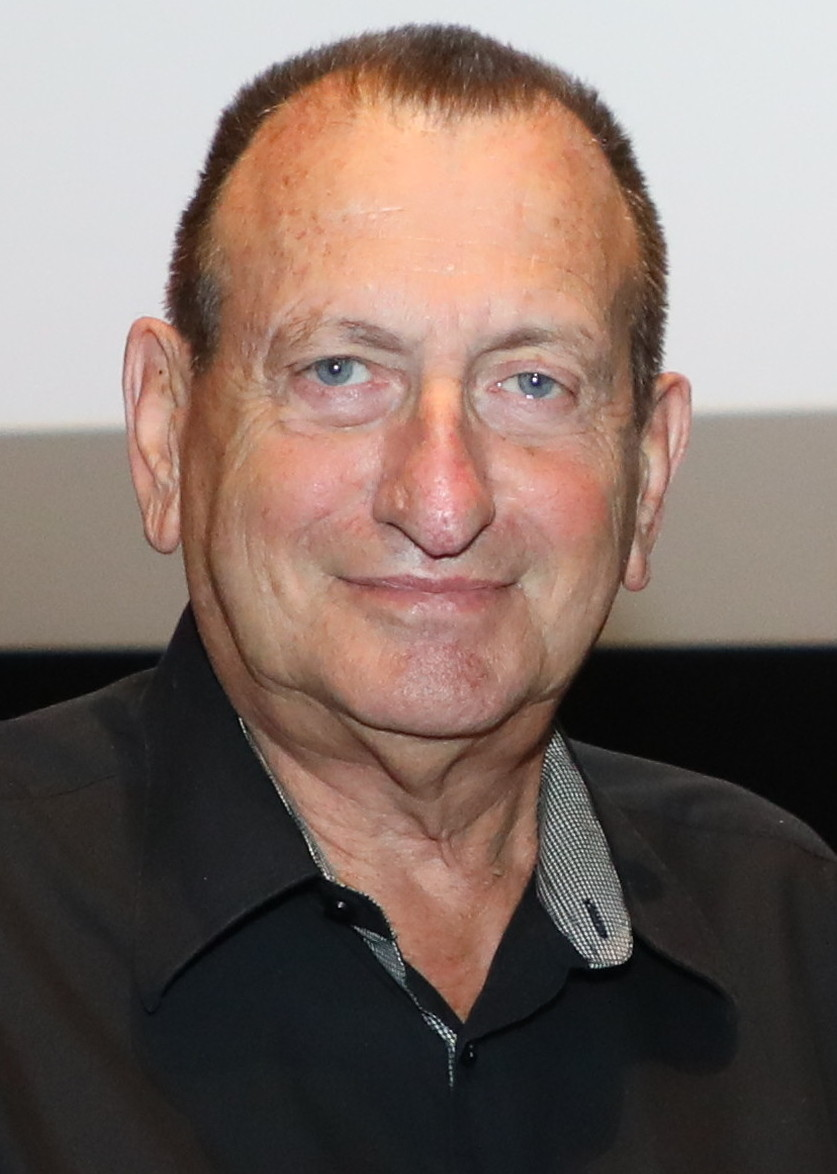
- Incumbent; Ron Huldai since 10 November 1998
- Term length: 5 years
- Formation: 1921
- Website: Office of the Mayor

The Mayor of Tel Aviv-Yafo is the head of the executive branch of the political system in Tel Aviv-Yafo. The mayor's office administers all city services, public property, most public agencies, and enforces city and state laws. The term of office is five years.

== List of mayors ==
	Mayor	Took office	Left office	Party
1	Meir Dizengoff	1921	1925	Independent
2	David Bloch-Blumenfeld	1925	1927	Ahdut HaAvoda
3	Meir Dizengoff	1927	1936	Independent
-	Moshe Chelouche	20 October 1936	30 October 1936	Independent
4	Israel Rokach	1936	1953	General Zionists
5	Chaim Levanon	1953	1959	General Zionists
6	Mordechai Namir	1959	1969	Mapai
7	Yehoshua Rabinovitz	1969	1974	Independent
8	Shlomo Lahat	1974	1993	Likud
9	Roni Milo	1993	1998	Likud
10	Ron Huldai	10 November 1998	Incumbent	Labor / Democrats

== See also ==
- Mayoral elections in Tel Aviv
- Mayor of Jerusalem
- Mayor of Haifa
