= Aryeh Azulai =

Israeli politician (1933–2025)

- אריה אזולאי
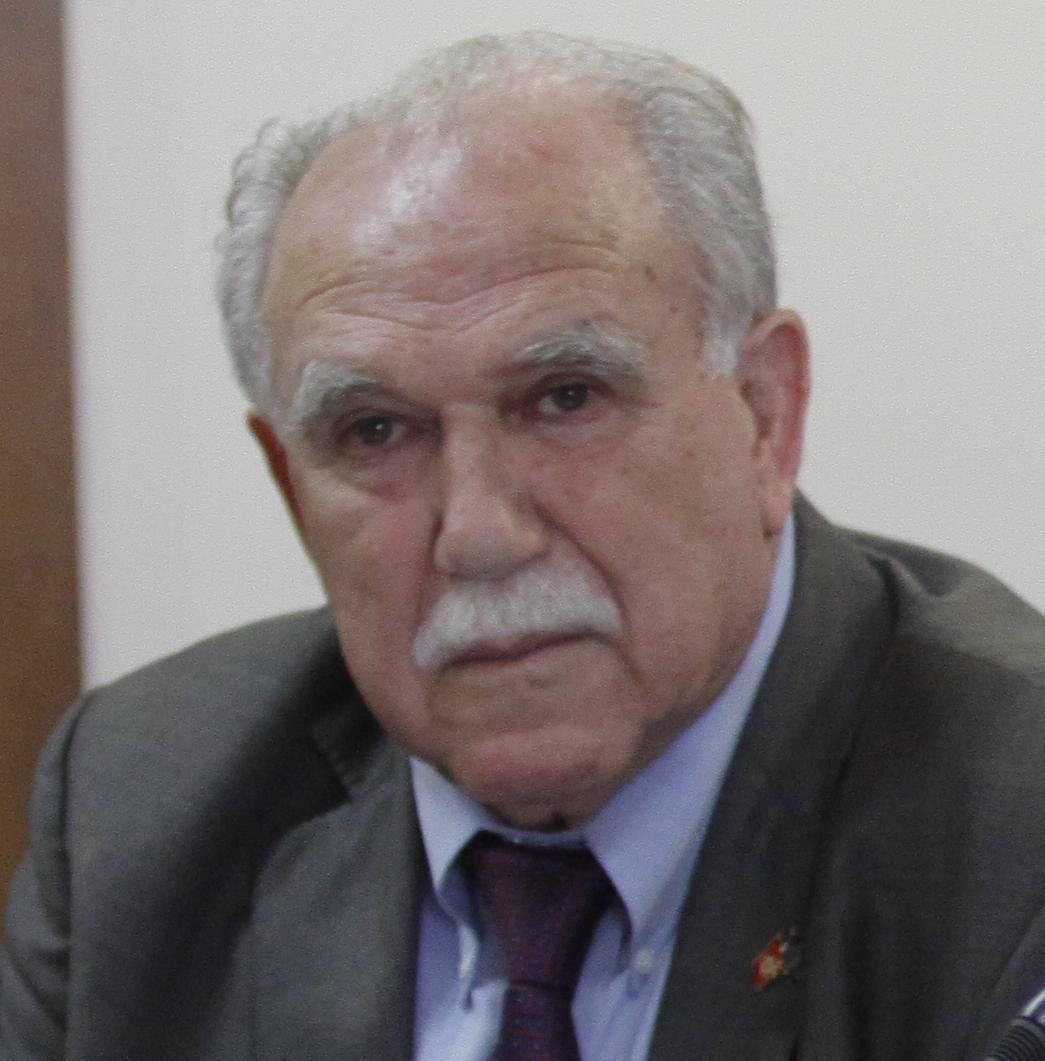
- Azoulay in 2013

3rd mayor of Ashdod
- In office 1983–1989
- Preceded by: Zvi Zilker
- Succeeded by: Zvi Zilker

Personal details
- Born: 9 July 1933 Fez, French protectorate in Morocco
- Died: 3 October 2025 (aged 92)
- Party: Labor
- Spouse: Rachel Azulai
- Children: Ithamar, Ofer and Esther

Aryeh Azulai (Hebrew: אריה אזולאי; 9 July 1933 – 3 October 2025) was an Israeli politician who was the third mayor of the city of Ashdod.

== Life and career ==
Born in Fes, Morocco, Azulai was a teacher by profession. He held a number of roles in the education system until he was elected as mayor of Ashdod in 1983. During his time as mayor his best-known achievement was the foundation of the Ashdod Development Company and the Korin Maman Museum.

He was replaced as mayor by Zvi Zilker (who he had earlier succeeded) in 1989. Since 1993 he had been involved in the Jewish Agency.

Azulai died on 3 October 2025, at the age of 92.
