= Hulda, Israel =

Kibbutz in central Israel

Hulda: חֻלְדָּה (Hebrew)
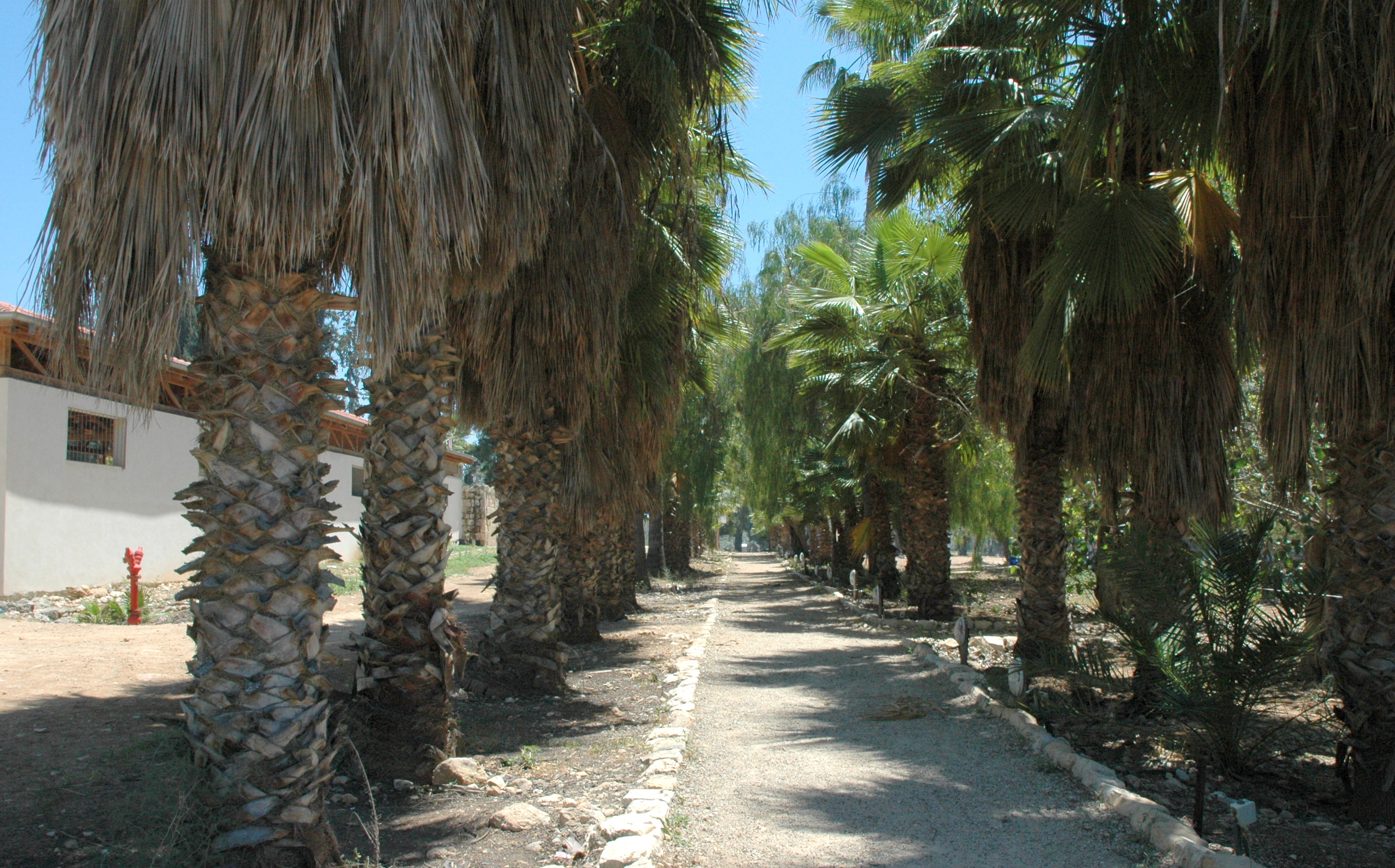

- Location within Central Israel Location within Israel
- Coordinates: 31°49′56″N 34°53′0″E
- Country: Israel
- District: Central
- Subdistrict: Ramla
- Council: Gezer
- Affiliation: Kibbutz Movement
- Founded: 1930
- Founder: Gordonia members
- Population (2024): 1,305
- Website: www.hulda.co.il

Hulda (Hebrew: חֻלְדָּה) is a kibbutz in central Israel. Located in the Shephelah near the Hulda Forest and the Burma Road, it falls under the jurisdiction of Gezer Regional Council. In 2024 it had a population of 1,305. The acclaimed Israeli writer, Amos Oz spent half his life living on the kibbutz.

== Etymology ==
The kibbutz takes its name from the Palestinian village of Khulda, which existed nearby until the 1948 Arab–Israeli War.

== History ==
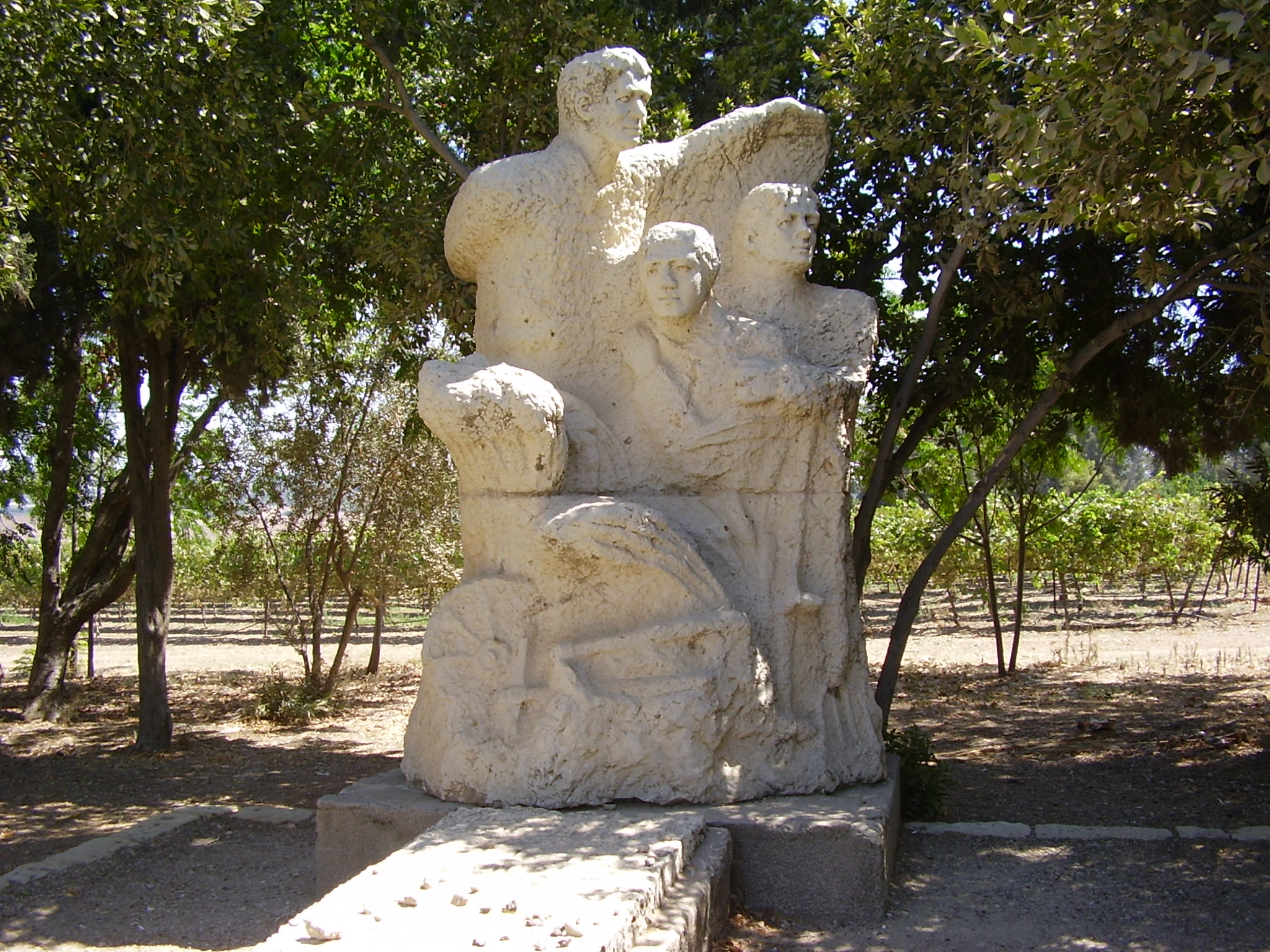
Hulda memorial

=== Ottoman rule ===
In 1905, the Anglo Palestine Bank purchased 2,000 dunams (2.0 km^{2}) of land from the Saidun tribe for a Jewish settlement near the Jaffa–Jerusalem railway. Ownership of the land was transferred to the Jewish National Fund which turned it over to the Palestine Office of the Zionist Organization (ZO). In 1909, the Hulda farm was established and a building (today Herzl House) was constructed to house the manager of the farm and was later used by the kibbutz members.

During the 1915 Ottoman Syria locust infestation, locusts inflicted significant agricultural damage on Hulda's fields. In October, settlement representatives requested 3,425 francs in assistance from the Zionist office in Berlin to meet expenses associated with the damage.

=== British Mandate ===
Groups of pioneers who trained at the Hulda farm helped establish Ein Harod (1921), Kfar Yehezkel (1921), Ginegar (1922) and other kibbutzim. According to a census conducted in 1922 by the British Mandate authorities, Hulda had a population of 40 Jews. During the 1929 Palestine riots, the farm was attacked and destroyed. British forces ordered the evacuation of the settlers, but barred them from taking the body of Ephraim Chizik, the Haganah commander who was killed in battle. In 1931, the Gordonia pioneer group resettled Hulda. The 1931 census mentions 49 inhabitants, with one residential house. The farm suffered several more attacks during the 1936–1939 Arab revolt in Palestine.There was however relative harmony between the pioneers and the Arab villagers of Khulda over the next seventeen years. The pioneers bought vegetable produce from the villagers and in turn provided them with medical supplies and medical treatment. Pioneers visited the village guesthouse and villagers were invited to the kibbutz communal dining hall. Both groups also shared a well.

On 31 March a convoy of the Harel Brigade left Hulda to deliver supplies to Jerusalem. The convoy was attacked by Arab forces from Ramla, killing twenty-two passengers.

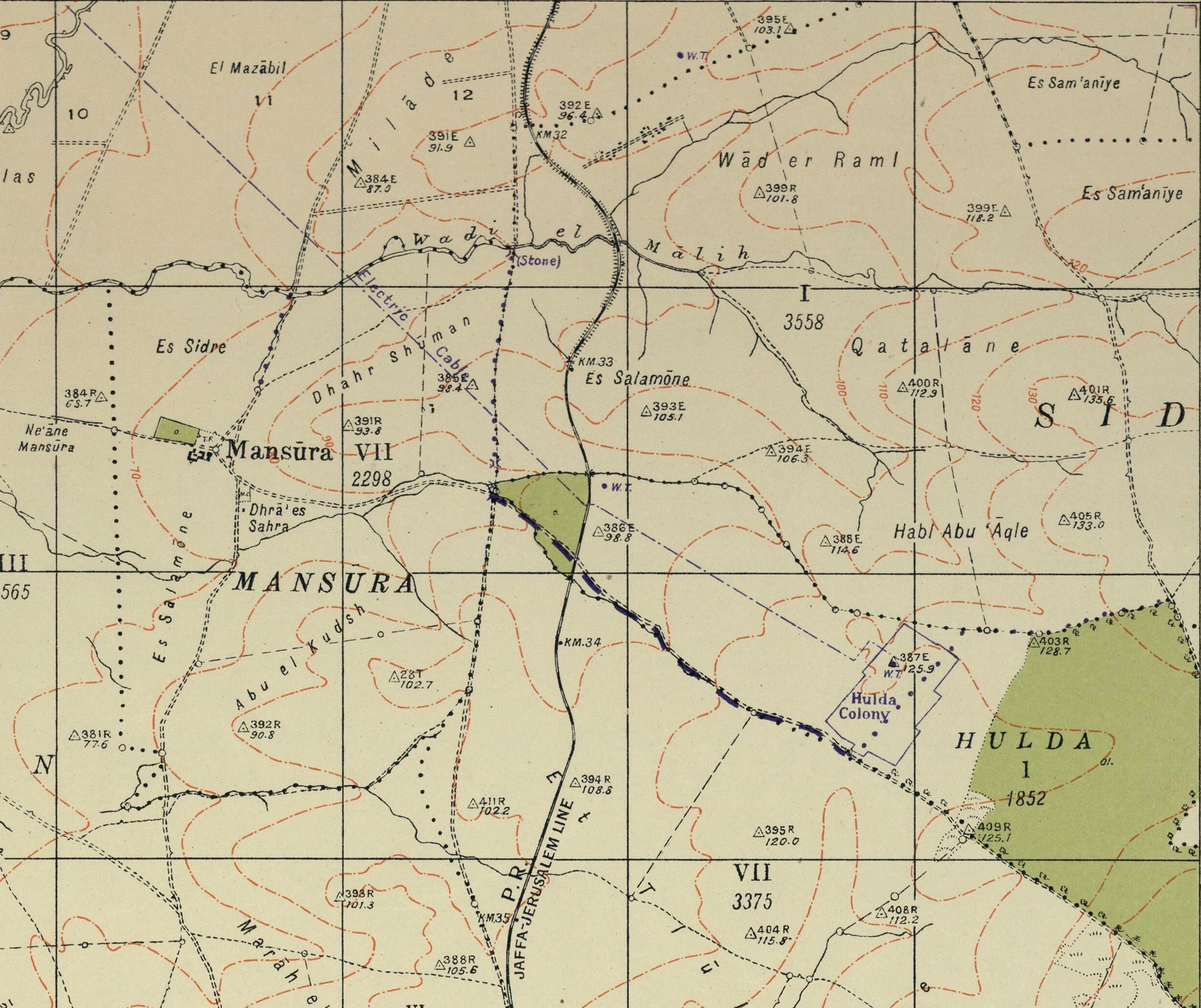
Hulda 1942 1:20,000

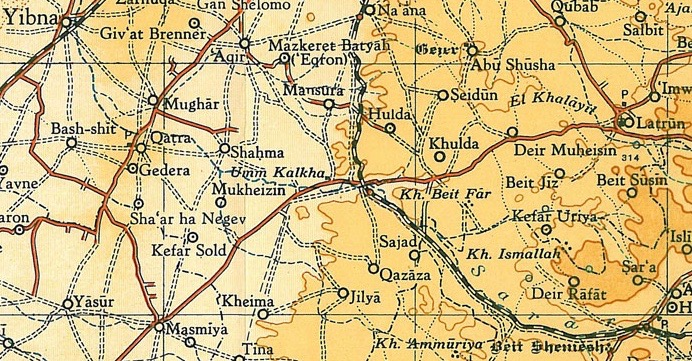
Hulda 1945 1:250,000

=== 1948 Arab–Israeli War ===
During the 1948 Arab–Israeli War it served as the headquarters of the Palmach's Yiftach Brigade and a base for convoys bringing supplies to Jerusalem. After the first truce the Harel Brigade 4th Battalion, Company B, also had its headquarters at Hulda. The kibbutz became a staging ground for Jewish convoys trying to break the Arab siege on Jerusalem. 230 convoys were set out to transport supplies to the besieged city, the largest of which were organized near Kibbutz Hulda.

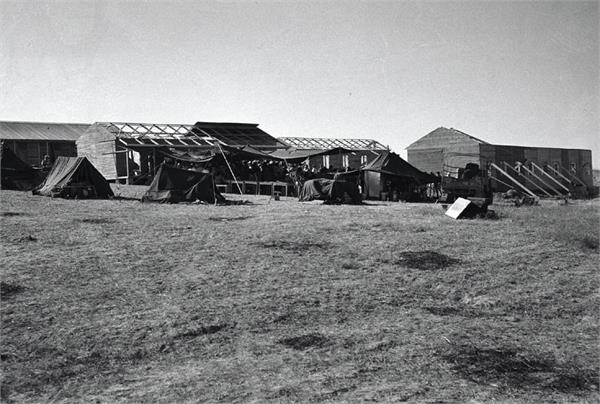
Hulda 1936

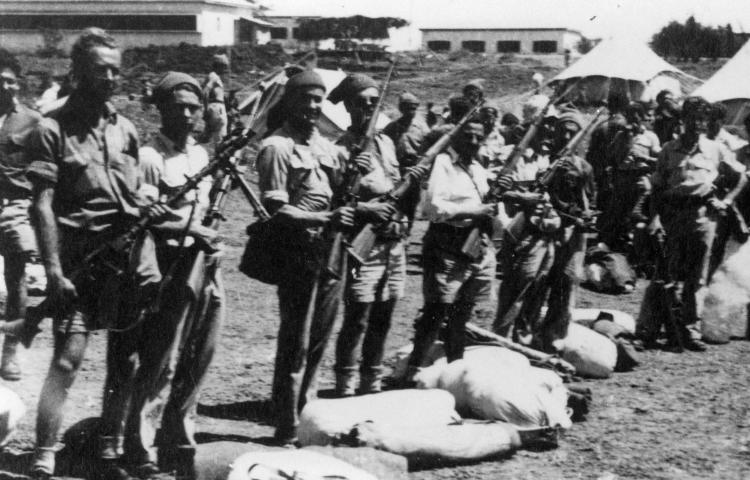
Members of the Harel Brigade preparing to move from Hulda to Jerusalem in April 1948

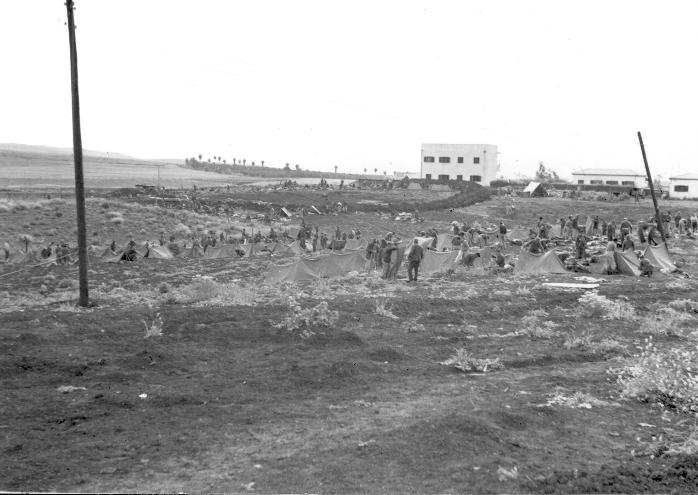
Members of the Harel Brigade assembling prior to Operation Nachshon in April 1948

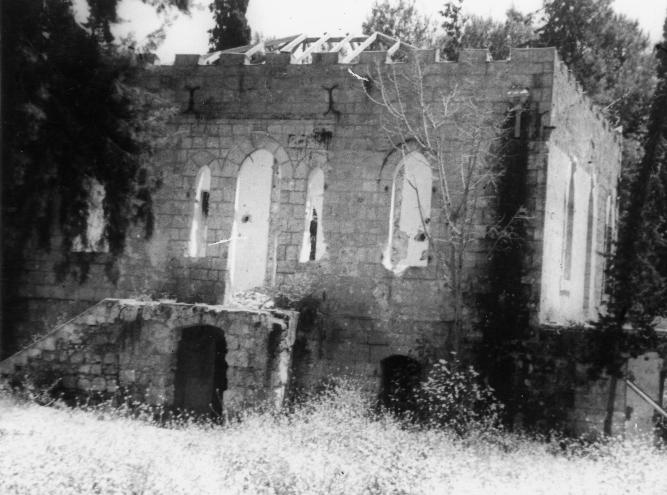
Original 1905 building: a neglected ruin in 1948

=== Since 1980 ===
In the early 1980s, membership was about 220, but financial difficulties led to the exodus of many families, leaving only half that number. The kibbutz has since been privatized.

== Economy ==
The Hulda vineyard, covering over 1,200 dunams, is the largest single vineyard in Israel. Hulda Transformers, established in 1975, produces and distributes transformers and power supplies for commercial, military and medical equipment. Yarok al Hamayim is a banquet facility at Kibbutz Hulda.

== Notable people ==
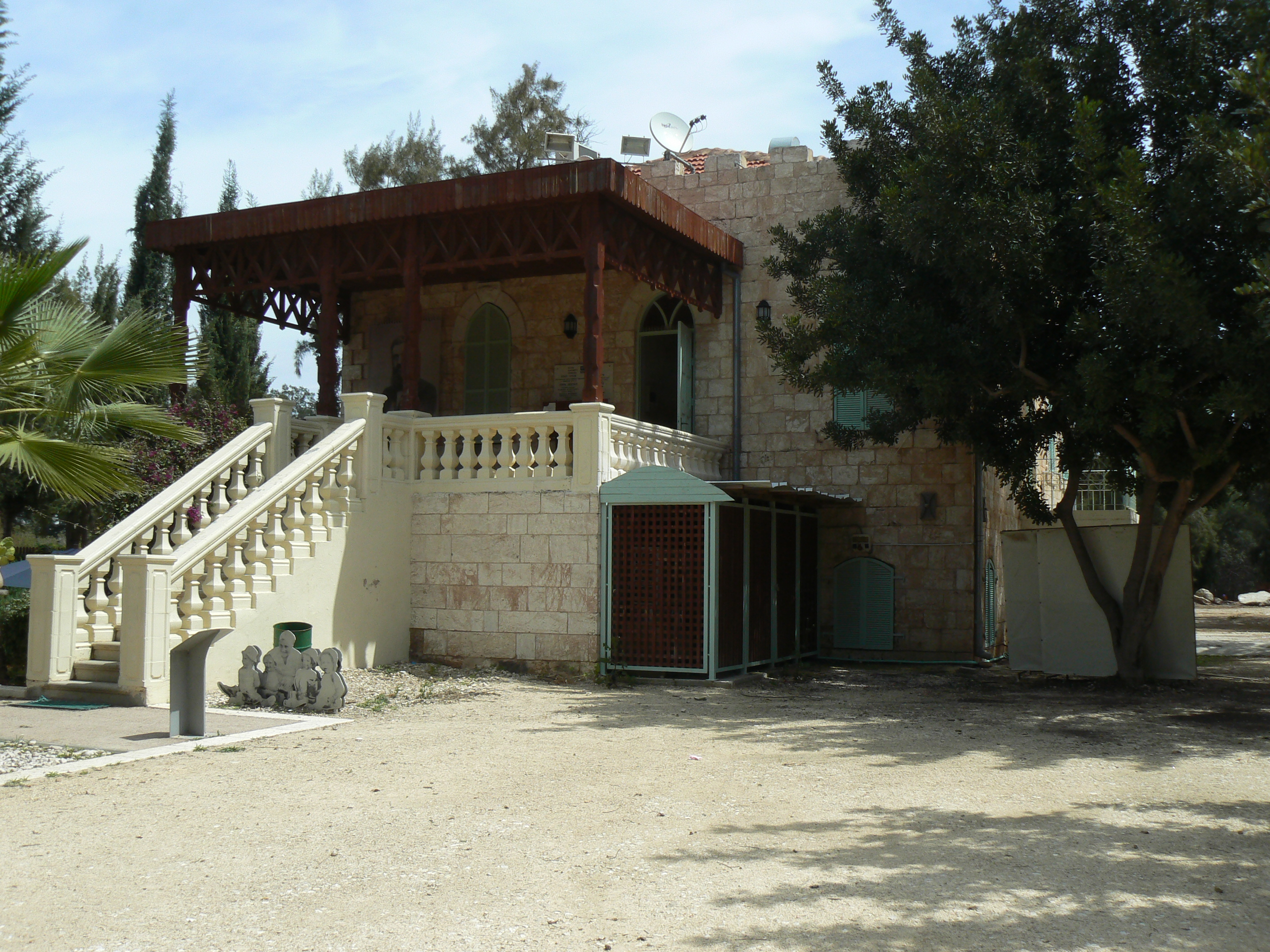
Herzl House, Kibbutz Hulda

- Ron Huldai, (whose father took the family surname from the name of the kibbutz)
- Pinhas Lavon
- Amos Oz, writer
