= Lev (political party) =

Lev לב
- Founded: 6 November 2002
- Dissolved: 6 November 2002
- Split from: Center Party
- Merged into: Likud
- Most MKs: 2 (2002)
- Fewest MKs: 2 (2002)

Lev (Hebrew: לב, lit. 'Heart') was a short-lived political faction in Israel, existing for only several minutes during the 15th Knesset on 6 November 2002.

== Background ==
After Ariel Sharon formed a coalition government with the Centre Party in 2001 following his victory in the special election for Prime Minister, speculation started that Centre Party MK Roni Milo intended to return to Likud. On 22 May 2002 Milo told fellow Centre Party MKs that he wanted to return to Likud and that he wanted them to come with him.

Eventually, on 6 November 2002, just Milo and Yehiel Lasri broke away from Centre Party, briefly forming the Lev faction which merged into Likud after only a few minutes in existence. Three other Centre Party MKs left and formed New Way, which later merged into Labour.
