= Pe'er Visner =

Israeli politician

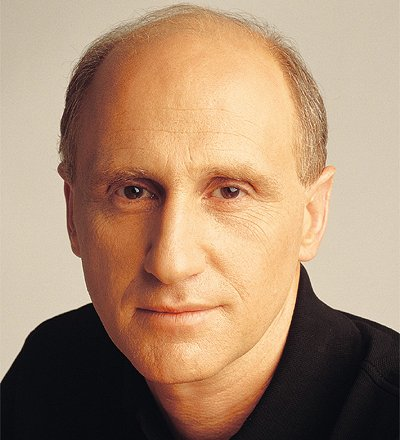
Pe'er Visner

Pe'er Visner (Hebrew: פאר ויסנר; born 1957) is an Israeli politician who was deputy mayor of Tel Aviv and chair of the Israeli Green Party.

== Political career ==
Visner strongly opposed a 2006 resolution by the United States Green Party calling for divestment from Israel. Visner wrote, "We are very disappointed that our sister party in the US did not consult with the Israel Green Party before passing this resolution. We hope that this breach in trust between our entities will be remedied with an apology and appropriate action by the US Greens."

Visner unsuccessfully ran for mayor of Tel Aviv in both the 2003 and 2008 mayoral elections.

In May 2008, Visner opposed a proposal to allow the Nokia Arena to be used for private functions, including weddings, as a way to recoup renovation costs. Visner argued that it was "not appropriate" to rent out the stadium for private use.

In October 2011, Visner was convicted of forgery and fraud. According to the prosecution, Visner had forged a document allowing him to pay significantly lower municipal fees for space he rented in Tel Aviv.

In 2012, Tel Aviv Magistrate's Court reversed Visner's conviction, but sentenced him to 250 hours of community service. In 2013, Amir Meltzer replaced him as Green Party chairman.
