= Nava Semel =

Israeli author, playwright, screenwriter and translator

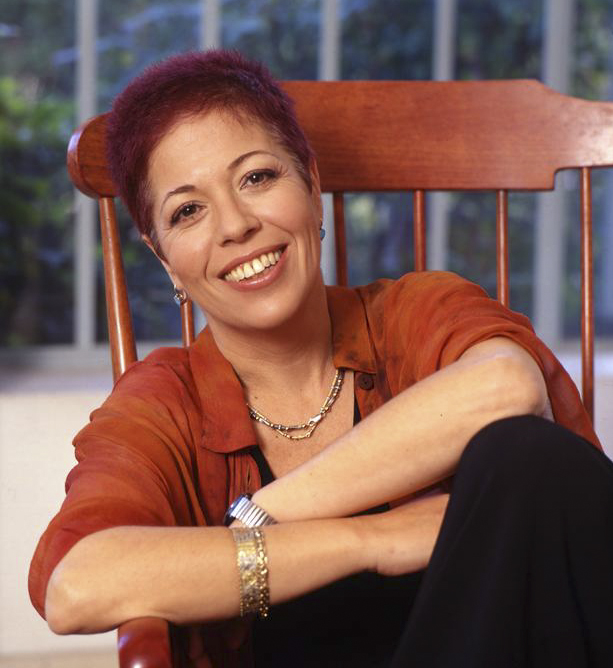
- Born: Nava Artzi; September 15, 1954; Jaffa, Israel
- Died: December 2, 2017 (aged 63); Tel Aviv, Israel
- Occupations: Author, playwright, screenwriter
- Spouse: Noam Semel
- Children: 3
- Parent: Yitzhak Artzi
- Relatives: Shlomo Artzi (brother); Meir Shapiro (great-uncle)

Nava Semel (נאוה סמל; September 15, 1954 – December 2, 2017) was an Israeli author, playwright, screenwriter and translator. Her short story collection Kova Zekhukhit (Hat of Glass) was the first work of fiction published in Israel to address the topic of the "Second Generation"—children of Holocaust survivors.

== Early life and education ==
Nava Semel was born 1954 in Jaffa, daughter of Yitzhak Artzi, a politician and member of the Knesset, and Mimi (Margalit), a survivor of the Auschwitz concentration camp and Kleineshenau. Her maternal grandmother was the sister of Rabbi Meir Shapiro. She was the younger sister of Israeli rock musician Shlomo Artzi. She had an MA in art history from Tel Aviv University.

== Career ==
Semel published 16 books, plays, opera libretti, poetry and screenplays. She also wrote plays and translated for the Hebrew stage. Her acclaimed novel And the Rat Laughed was adapted into an opera libretto in 2005.

== Critical reception ==
Her works have been translated into many languages and published in many countries.

== Recurring themes ==
Her work focuses on the "second generation" (children of Holocaust survivors) in Israel. Her characters are native born Israelis, who confront their identity issues and deal with the scars of the painful past.

== Public projects and activism ==
Semel was a member of the Board of Directors of Massuah, the Institute for Holocaust Studies at Kibbutz Tel Yitzhak, and for many years was a member of the Board of Governors of Yad Vashem. She was also on the Board of Directors of the "New Foundation for Television and Cinema".

== Personal life ==
Nava Semel was married to Noam Semel, the Director General of the Cameri Theatre of Tel Aviv, and mother of three children. She lived in Tel Aviv, Israel.

== Awards and honors ==
She received the Prime Minister's Prize for Hebrew Literary Works in 1996, "The Women Writers of the Mediterranean Award" in France 1994, and "Women of the Year in Literature of the City of Tel Aviv" 2006.

== Works ==
=== Fiction ===
- Poems of Pregnancy and Birth. Poetry Collection, 1985.
- Hat of Glass. The first Israeli book in prose to focus on the children of Holocaust survivors. Published in 1985; with a new edition 1998. Translated into German, Italian and Romanian. Stories from the collection were published in Great Britain, Spain, Greece, France, Turkey, Albania and China.
- Paper Bride. Novel, published in 1996, then in Romania 2000, and Germany 2003. Finalist of the YA German book award 2004.
- Becoming Gershona. Young Adult novel, published by Viking-Penguin, winner of the National Jewish Book Award in the United States 1991. Has been translated into Italian, German, Romanian, and Dutch, and adapted for Israeli television.
- Night Games. Novel, published in 1994.
- Flying Lessons. Cross-over novel which tells the story of a Holocaust survivor from Tunisia who teaches an Israeli girl how to fly. Published by Simon & Schuster in 1995. It was chosen as one of the best young adults novels in Germany 1995. It has been translated into German, Czech, Italian, Spanish, Dutch, Serbian and Albanian, and was adapted for the Israeli television. In 2009, it was produced as an opera, composed by Ella Milch-Sheriff, directed by Yael Ronen. The opera was a co-production of the Cameri Theatre of Tel Aviv with the Israeli New Opera and the Beer Sheva Sinfonyetta Orchestra. The libretto was published as a book by the Institute for Israeli Drama 2010.
- Who Stole the Show?. Children's book, published in 1997. It won the Illustrated Book of the Year Award 1998 and was cited at the "Ze'ev Award" 1999. It was published in Italy 2003, and an English-Romanian bi-lingual edition was published in 2008. Adapted for a television series in 1999.
- Night Poems. Poetry collection for young people on darkness and fears, published in 2000.
- And the Rat Laughed. Novel, published in 2001, to highly favorable reviews. It was published in Germany 2007 and Australia 2008. It was produced as an opera in 2005, and a film version is planned.
- The Courage to be Afraid. Another poetry collection for young people on darkness and fears, published in 2005. Selected poems were published in Great Britain, Germany and the USA. They were also set to music by Ella Milch-Sheriff and Hava Alberstein.
- IsraIsland. Novel, published in 2006. A documentary based on the book is in production (Director: Oshra Schwartz). Excerpts were published in the USA.
- Beginner's Love. Young adult book, published in 2006. It was then published in Italy in 2007, the Czech Republic in 2008 and Germany in 2010. The book won the "Best 7" award of the German Radio in 2010.
- Australian Wedding. Autobiographical fiction, published in 2009. Excerpts were published in the United States and Australia.

=== Stage and screen ===
- An Old Woman. Monodrama on the life of the elderly. Produced by the Haifa Municipal Theatre 1983, and ran until 1989.
- The Last winter. Original dialogues for an Israeli-American feature film co-production. Director: Riky Shelach. Actresses: Kathleen Quinlan and Yona Elian, 1983.
- Hunger. Radio drama, based on a story from "Hat of Glass", produced by the WDR in Germany, 1989.
- The Child behind the Eyes. Monodrama, first produced in 1986, and ran on the Israeli stage for 11 years. It has also been produced as a radio play by the BBC London, Radio France, Radio Belgium, Radio Spain, Radio Ireland, six radio stations in Germany, Radio Austria and Radio Romania. It won the "Best Radio Drama" award in Austria 1996, and released on CD. New Broadcast in Austria 2008. On the stage it was performed in Rome (1990), New York (1991), Los Angeles (1996), Prague (1997), Sibiu Theatre Festival (2004), Resita Theatre in Romania (2005), State Theatre of Ankara, Turkey (2005), Lodz Theatre - Poland (2006), Bucharest Theatre (2007). New production in Israel in Arabic 2006 with actress-singer Amal Murkus. The play was published as a print book in 1988 and an e-book in 2002.
- Saying Kaddish and Leave – a screenplay for a documentary on the Holocaust of the Jews in Romania. Produced by the Israeli Educational TV in 1999.
- Thousand Calories. TV drama, produced by the Israeli 2nd channel, 2002.
- An Old Man. Monodrama, produced by the Israeli Theatre for Young People 2003.
- And the Rat Laughed. Opera based on the novel, composed by Ella Milch-Sheriff, directed by Oded Kotler. Produced by the Israeli Chamber Orchestra and the Cameri Theatre of Tel Aviv. World Premiere April 2005. The opera ran on the stage of the Cameri Theatre until 2009. Nava Semel and Ella Milch-Sheriff won the "Rosenblum Award" of the City of Tel Aviv. The opera was performed also in Warsaw 2006, Sibiu Festival 2007 and the National Theatre in Bucharest 2007. A new production of the opera opened in 2009 in Toronto, Canada on the stage of Opera York. It was performed in Hebrew.
- Sneaking into the Bible. Song cycle on biblical themes, composed by Ella Milch-Sheriff. Ramat Gan Chamber Choir, conducted by Hanna Tsur. Premiered at the Abu Gosh Music Festival in 2005. Performed also at Tzavta Theatre 2005 and Ramat Gan Theatre 2007.
- There in the World That Is New. Musical, 6 minute-piece on a girl on her journey to Israel after the Holocaust. Composed by Ella Milch-Sheriff. Performed by Li-Ron Choir Herzliya, conducted by Ronit Shapira, Torchlight Assembly, Holocaust Memorial Day 2008 at Massuah, Institute for Holocaust Studies, Kibbutz Tel Yitzhak. Live broadcast on cable TV HOT.
- Ballad of Three Prophets. Ten-minute musical piece on the three faiths, composed by Ella Milch-Sheriff. Performed by Moran Choir, conducted by Neomi Faran. Premiered at the Song Bridge Festival, Poland on May 8, 2008. Performed also on Holocaust International Commemoration Day 2009 at Massuah, Institute for Holocaust Studies, Kibbutz Tel Yitzhak.
- Whereabouts Unknown. TV drama about new immigrants upon their arrival to Israel in 1949. Produced by the Israeli Television- First Channel (Director: Yahli Bergman) 2010.
