= Yitzhak Artzi =

Israeli politician (1920–2003)

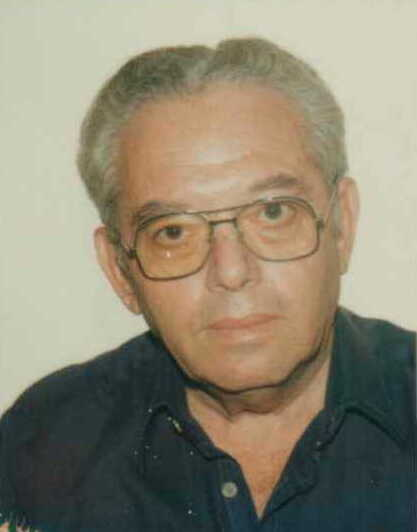
- Artzi in the 1980s

Faction represented in the Knesset
- 1984–1988: Alignment
- 1988: Shinui

Personal details
- Born: 14 November 1920 Siret, Romania
- Died: 17 September 2003 (aged 82)

Yitzhak Artzi (Hebrew: יצחק ארצי; 14 November 1920 – 17 September 2003) was an Israeli politician who served as a member of the Knesset between 1984 and 1988.

== Biography ==
Born Izo Hertzig in Siret, Romania into a Hassidic family, Artzi was educated at high schools in his hometown and Cernăuți, before attending the Jewish College in Bucharest. A leading activist in the HaNoar HaTzioni youth movement, he was amongst the leadership of the Zionist underground in Romania during World War II, helping to rescue children from transit camps, as well as organising illegal immigration to Palestine and helping in the Cyprus internment camps.

He became a settler in Mandate Palestine in 1946, and studied law and economics at Tel Aviv University, gaining certification as a lawyer. Between 1947 and 1950 he was a member of the Alonei Abba moshav. Whilst living there he had the first of his two children, Shlomo (b. 1949), a musician; his daughter, Nava (1954–2017), a writer, was born in Jaffa. He also worked as an information and public relations officer for the State Income Administration.

Having joined the Progressive Party, he served as its secretary general from 1959 until 1961 and was deputy editor of its Zmanim newspaper, where he headed its editorial board. When the party merged into the Liberal Party, he served as its secretary general until 1965, when most former Progressive Party members left to establish the Independent Liberals, which he served as secretary general of for a year. From 1966 until 1969 he headed the Youth Aliyah department of the Jewish Agency for Israel, of which he was also a member of the board of directors.

From 1974 until 1979 Artzi was vice mayor of Tel Aviv. He was a candidate in the 1978 Tel Aviv mayoral election, but finished last of four candidates with 3.83% of the vote. He subsequently served as deputy mayor between 1979 and 1983. He was elected to the Knesset in 1984 on the Alignment list (the Independent Liberals had merged into it after losing their last seat in the 1981 elections). On 15 March 1988 he left the Alignment to join Shinui. However, he lost his seat in the elections later that year. He ran for the Tel Aviv mayoralty again in the 1989 municipal elections, but finished sixth with 3.5% of the vote.

He died in 2003 at the age of 82.
