= Roni Milo =

Israeli politician (born 1949)

- רוני מילוא
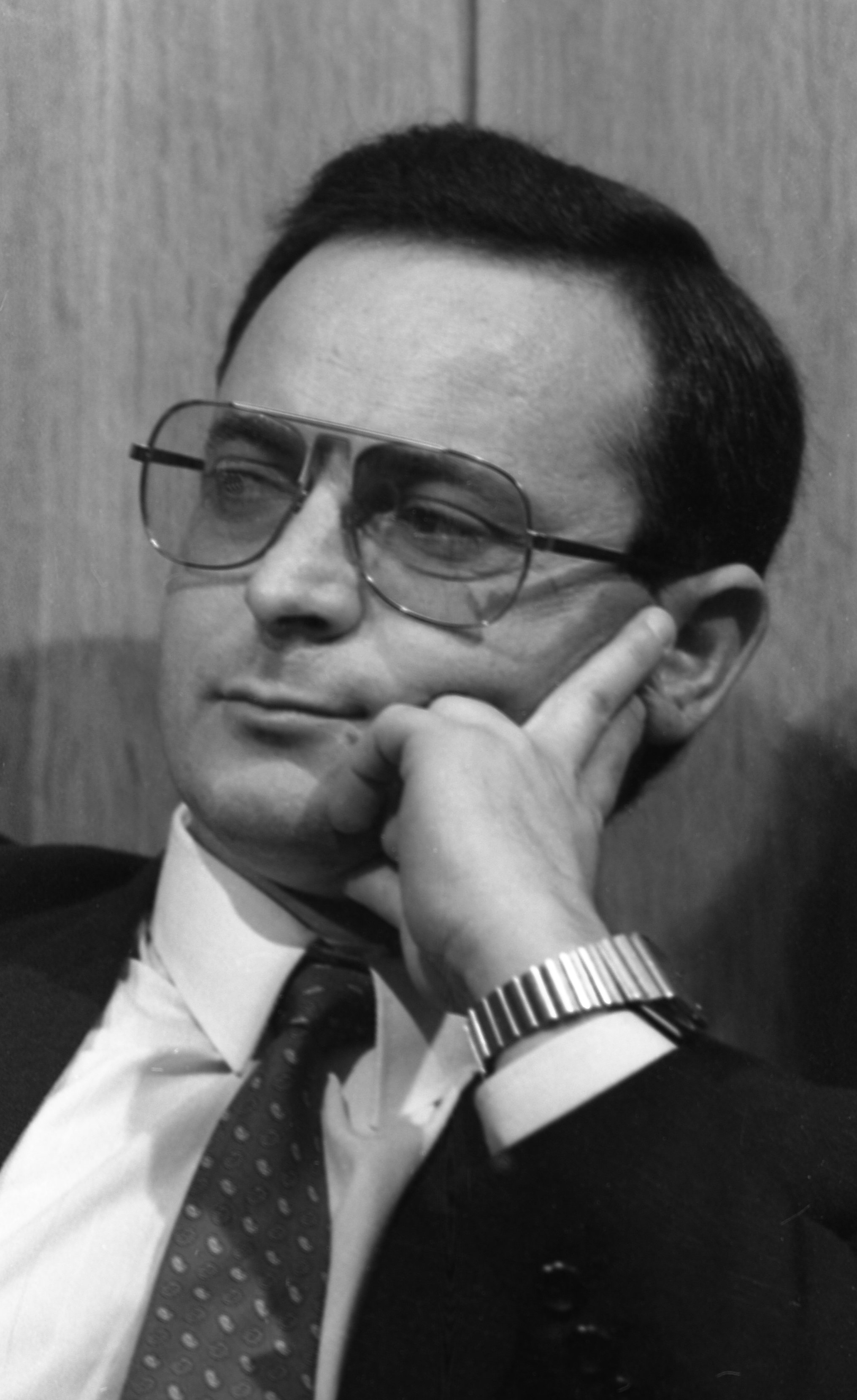

Ministerial roles
- 1988–1990: Minister of the Environment
- 1990: Minister of Labour & Social Welfare
- 1990–1992: Minister of Police
- 2000–2001: Minister of Health
- 2001–2003: Minister of Regional Co-operation

Faction represented in the Knesset
- 1977–1993: Likud
- 1999–2002: Center Party
- 2002: Lev
- 2002–2003: Likud

Personal details
- Born: 26 November 1949 (age 76) Tel Aviv, Israel

Roni Milo (Hebrew: רוני מילוא; born 26 November 1949) is an Israeli politician, lawyer and journalist, and a former Knesset member who held several ministerial positions. He was also mayor of Tel Aviv from 1993 to 1998.

== Political career ==
Born Ron Milikovsky in Tel Aviv in 1949, he attended Tichon Hadash high school in Tel Aviv. Milo started his political activity during his student days, when he was Chairman of the Israeli Student Union. After graduating from Tel Aviv University with a law degree, he moved into politics with the Herut faction of Likud, and was Chairman of the party's Information Department. Elected to the ninth Knesset in 1977 as a Likud MK, Milo was the country's first ever Minister of the Environment in Yitzhak Shamir's government in 1988, before becoming Minister of Labor and Social Welfare in 1990, though he switched to Minister of Police in a cabinet reshuffle later in the year. He also became Chairman of the World Likud Organisation, and was editor of the Yoman HaShavua (lit. Diary of the Week) weekly publication.

In 1993, Milo was elected to succeed Shlomo Lahat as Mayor of Tel Aviv-Yafo, and resigned from the Knesset on 30 December 1993 to concentrate on his mayoral duties. Milo served as mayor until 1998, when he announced he would not seek reelection, and was succeeded by Ron Huldai.

Following the end of his spell as mayor, Milo returned to the Knesset after the 1999 elections as a member of the Center Party, and was made Minister of Health in Ehud Barak's government in 2000. After Ariel Sharon won special elections for Prime Minister in 2001, Milo was made Minister of Regional Co-operation in the new government. He left the Centre Party with Yehiel Lasri to form Lev, which joined Likud after just a few minutes in existence. After only being placed 47th on the Likud list, he lost his seat in the 2003 elections.

== Professional career ==
Working as a representative of Elbit Systems, Milo sold Israeli-built spy drones to Georgia in 2001. The sale was facilitated by US grants.
