= Yehiel Lasri =

Israeli politician (born 1957)

Yechiel Lasri
- יחיאל לסרי
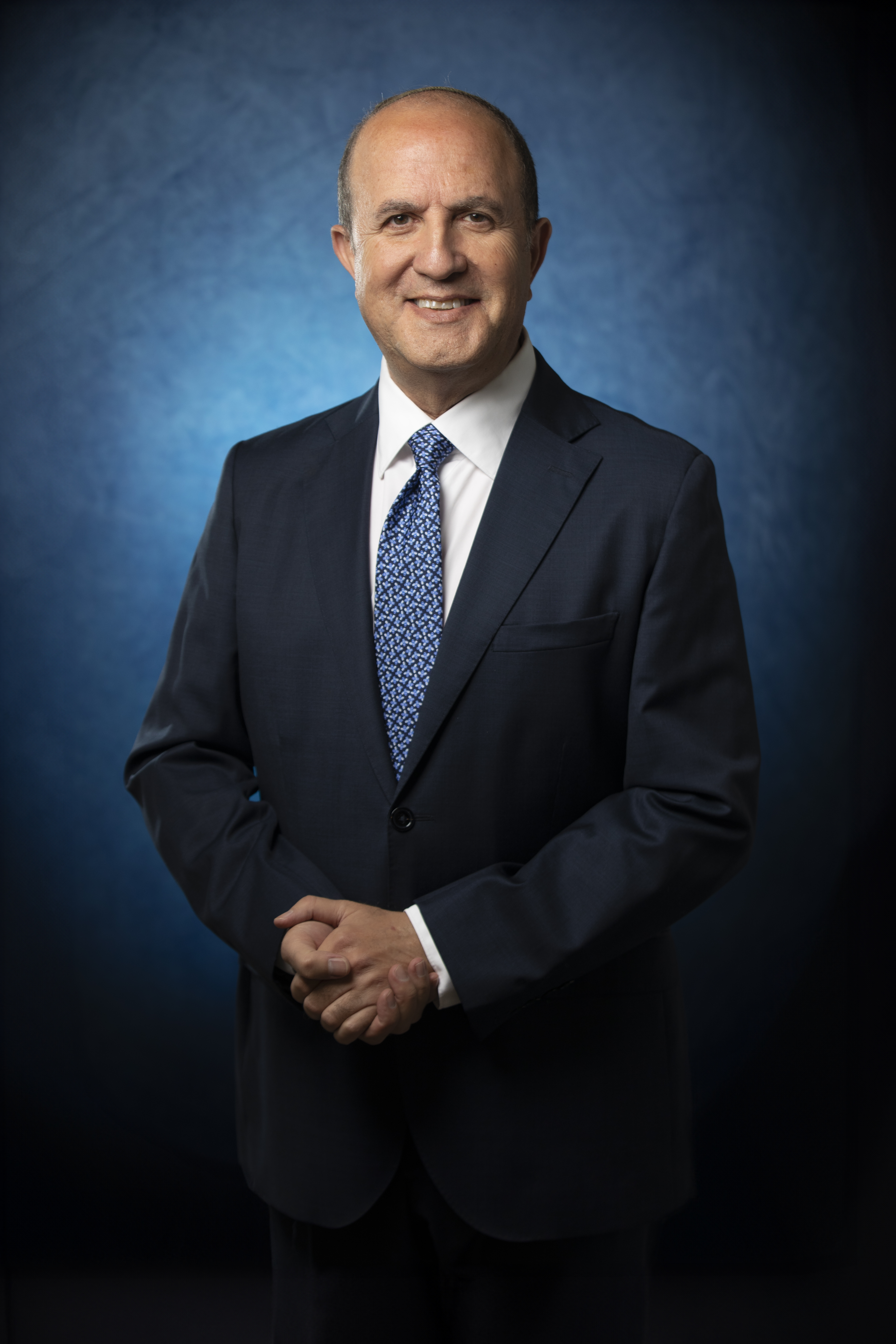
- Lasri in 2023

Mayor of Ashdod
- Incumbent
- Assumed office 2008

Faction represented in the Knesset
- 1999–2002: Center Party
- 2002: Lev
- 2002–2003: Likud

Personal details
- Born: 21 August 1957 (age 69) Errachidia, Morocco

Yechiel Lasri (Hebrew: יחיאל לסרי; born 21 August 1957) is an Israeli physician and politician who serves as mayor of Ashdod. He previously served as a member of the Knesset for the Center Party, Lev and Likud.

== Biography ==
Lasri was born in Morocco to a Jewish family, one of four children, and made aliyah to Israel in 1963, when his family moved to Ashdod. While growing up, he lost his father, and his illiterate mother washed floors to support her children. He was allowed to postpone military conscription to the Israel Defense Forces to study as part of the Atuda program. He studied medicine at Ben-Gurion University of the Negev. After completing his medical studies, he interned in the Department of Internal Medicine at Kaplan Medical Center in Rehovot. He served in the Israeli Navy, where he filled a variety of medical positions. He eventually rose to the rank of lieutenant colonel.

After his discharge from the IDF, he worked as an internal medicine specialist. He was Deputy Director of the Department of Internal Medicine at Kaplan Medical Center. He specialized in treating AIDS and served as Acting Director of the Kaplan Medical Center AIDS Institute. Away from his job, he was one of the founders of the Israeli Andalusia Orchestra in 1994, and a director on its board.

In 1998, he was elected to Ashdod city council on the New Ashdod list. For the 1999 Knesset elections he was placed ninth on the Centre Party list. Although the party won only six seats, Lasri entered the Knesset on 28 March 2001 as a replacement for Yitzhak Mordechai. On 6 November 2002, he and Roni Milo left the party and established the Lev faction, which immediately merged into Likud.

After being placed 53rd on Likud's list, Lasri lost his seat in the 2003 elections, and returned to Ashdod city council, where he was elected mayor in 2008. He received an MBA from IDC Herzliya.

Lasri has three children from his first wife, Miriam, an educator by profession who died in 2010. He married Iyrit Alexenberg in 2017.
