= Emblem of Tel Aviv-Yafo =

Coat of arms of Israeli city

Coat of arms of Tel Aviv

The coat of arms of Tel Aviv is an official emblem of the Israeli city of Tel Aviv-Yafo.

== History ==
In 1934, on the 25th anniversary of the founding of the city, the authorities decided to create their own coat of arms for the city. The competition of submitted works was won by Nachum Gutman. His project contained characteristic motifs of the city and emphasized the connection with Theodor Herzel.

== Description ==
Seven stars refer to Herzel's plan to establish a 7-hour working day. The lighthouse in the center of the logo refers to the old port of Tel Aviv, which for many years served as a gateway to the country for thousands of immigrants.

Flag of Tel Aviv

The inscription in the coat of arms comes from the Book of Jeremiah 31:4.

I will build you up again, and you, Virgin Israel, will be rebuilt.

In 1959, on the occasion of Tel Aviv's 50th anniversary, the appearance of the coat of arms was revised. A canopy in the shape of residential buildings was added, which suggests a huge expansion of the city.

== Flag ==
The municipal flag of Tel Aviv-Yafo is based on the flag of Israel. It features two horizontal blue stripes reminiscent of the tallit (the Jewish prayer shawl). In the center is Tel Aviv-Yafo's municipal emblem. A vertical variant is sometimes used during ceremonial functions.
