= Ron Huldai =

Israeli politician (born 1944)

- רון חולדאי
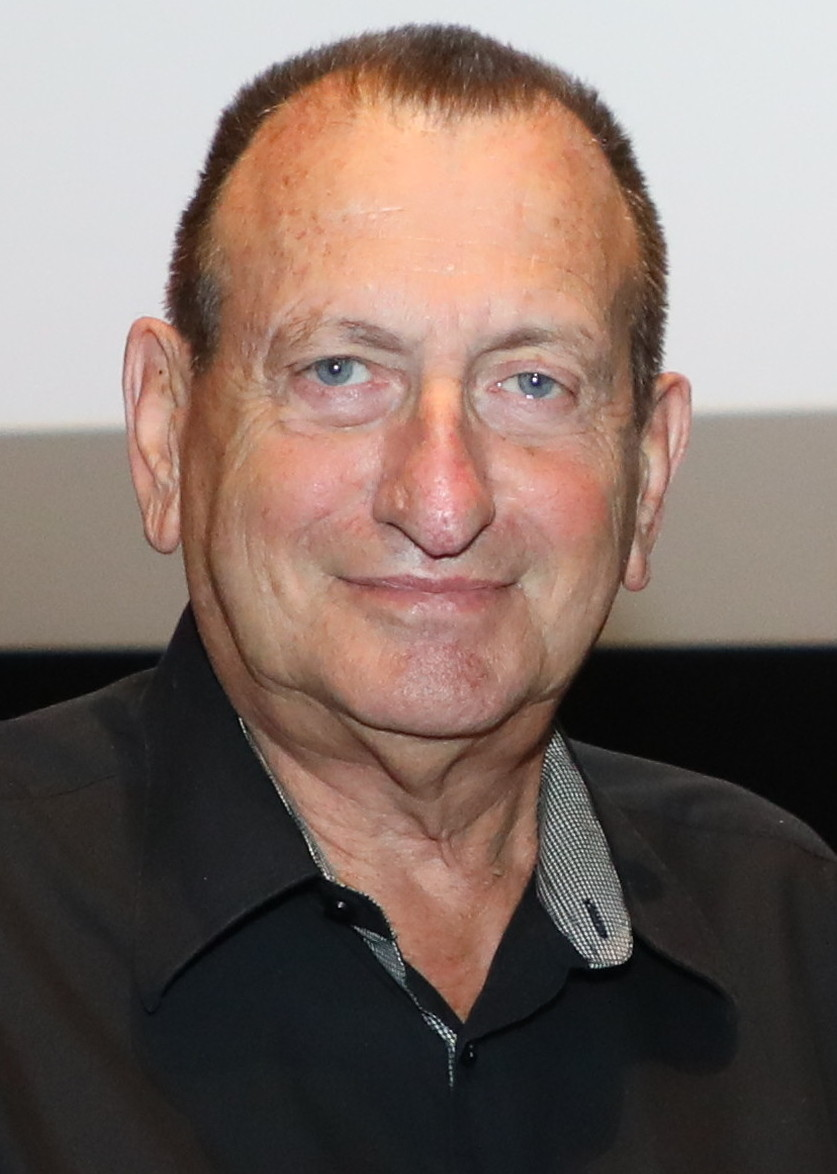
- Huldai in 2018

10th Mayor of Tel Aviv
- Incumbent
- Assumed office 10 November 1998
- Preceded by: Roni Milo

Personal details
- Born: 26 August 1944 (age 82) Hulda, Mandatory Palestine
- Party: Democrats (since 2024)
- Other political affiliations: The Israelis (2020); Labor (1998–2024)
- Spouse: Yael Katz (m. 1969)
- Children: 3
- Education: Tel Aviv University; Auburn University at Montgomery; USAF Air War College
- Awards: Legion of Honour (2021)

Military service
- Allegiance: State of Israel
- Branch/service: Israeli Air Force
- Years of service: 1963–1989
- Rank: Brigadier General (Tat Aluf)

Ron Huldai (Hebrew: רון חולדאי; born 26 August 1944) is an Israeli politician and businessman who has been Mayor of Tel Aviv since 1998. Before taking office as mayor, Huldai served as a fighter pilot and commander in the Israeli Air Force. After leaving the Israel Defense Forces as a brigadier general, he entered the business world and was later headmaster of the Herzliya Hebrew Gymnasium in Tel Aviv.

== Early life ==
He was born in 1944 in Hulda (his surname is derived from the name of the kibbutz), one of three brothers born to Polish Jewish immigrant parents who moved to the British mandate in Palestina EI = ("Eretz Israel" - official name of the area during the British mandate in the area) from Łódź. His father Ozer Obarzański was among the founders of the kibbutz and the principal of its school, while his mother Hana was a teacher and headed the organization of performances at the kibbutz. Huldai grew up in the kibbutz. He studied at Tel Aviv University, Auburn University at Montgomery, the Air War College at Maxwell Air Force Base in Montgomery, Alabama, and the Advanced Management Program at the Wharton School of the University of Pennsylvania.

== Military service ==
Huldai was conscripted into the Israel Defense Forces in 1963, and joined the Israeli Air Force, serving as a combat pilot and becoming a career officer. During the Six-Day War, he participated in Operation Focus, and participated in numerous missions in which and he shot down three enemy aircraft. He subsequently participated in the War of Attrition and after that, he was appointed as the deputy commander of the 105 Squadron.

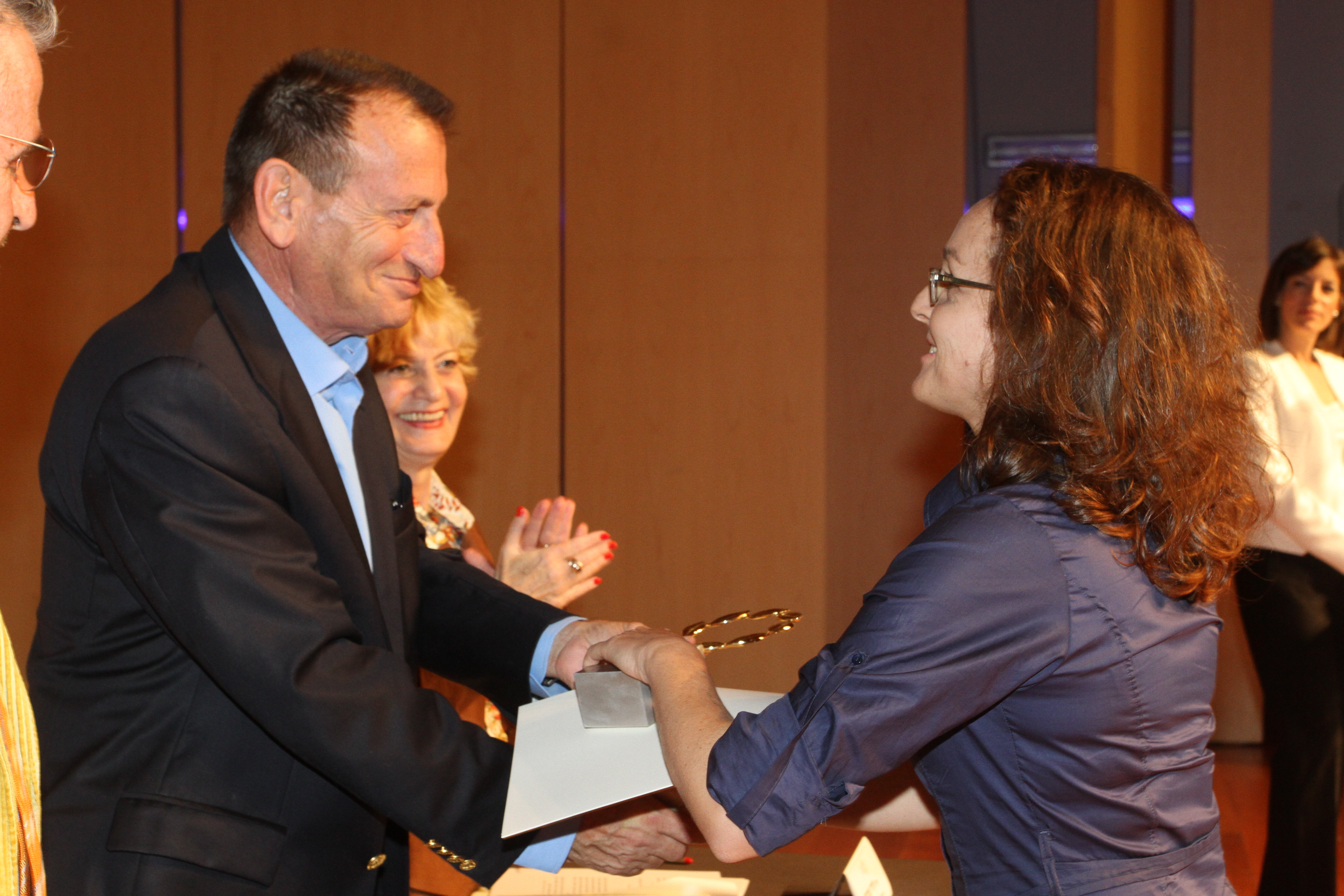
Ron Huldai awarding the Dizengoff prize, the Tel Aviv municipality award for art, 2011

When the Yom Kippur War broke out, he assumed the role of acting commander for the 201 Phantom Squadron, filling in for Yiftach Zemer, who was temporarily in the United States. Huldai led the Squadron in Operation Model 5, a mission that resulted in significant damage to the unit, until he was replaced by Eitan Ben Eliyahu. On the thirteenth day of the war, he led an attack against an Egyptian SAM battery, and during this mission, his aircraft was hit by a missile, leading to an emergency landing at Rephidim Airbase. On the eighteenth day of the conflict, Huldai led a quartet of covert aircraft in a mission targeting fuel facilities in northern Syria. During this operation, he engaged in a dogfight and successfully shot down a MiG-21. In total, he shot down three enemy aircraft during the war.

Subsequently, he was appointed as the commander of the 140 Douglas A-4 Skyhawk Squadron, and later, he assumed the role of commander for the 105 Squadron. Huldai held several key senior command positions, including as the commander of Nevatim Airbase, Hatzerim Airbase, the Air Force Pilots Training School, and a coordinator of the government authorities and supervisor of civilian construction projects for the IAF. He left the IAF in 1989 with the rank of Brigadier General.

Following his retirement from active duty in 1989, he entered the private sector. After spending two years selling air conditioners in Nigeria, he returned to Israel and managed the closure of a construction plant in Ramla. He then became headmaster of the prestigious Herzliya Hebrew High School for six years until 1998.

== Political career ==
The Israelis הישראלים
- Leader: Ron Huldai
- Founded: 29 December 2020
- Split from: Labor
- Merged into: Labor
- Ideology: Labor Zionism; Social liberalism Progressivism; Egalitarianism; Two-state solution
- Political position: Centre-left
- Knesset: 0 / 120

Huldai is a member of the Labor Party. In 1998, Huldai entered the mayoral elections for Tel Aviv following the announcement by the incumbent mayor, Roni Milo, that he would not seek another term. Huldai ran as an independent candidate under the party name "Tel Aviv 1", with the support of the Labor Party. He was elected with approximately 50% of the votes, while his primary rival, Doron Rubin, received around 25% of the votes. His party won five seats on the city council.

Huldai was re-elected in 2003 with 62% of the vote, again in 2008 with 50.6%, in 2013 with 53% and yet again in 2018 with 46%. He planned to run for the Knesset in the 2021 Israeli legislative election as part of a new left-wing party named The Israelis. The party was joined by Justice Minister Avi Nissenkorn and MK Einav Kabla, both of whom had left the Blue and White party. However, Nissenkorn left the party on 31 January 2021, reportedly as a prerequisite by Israeli Labor Party leader Merav Michaeli for a merger between both parties, and on 4 February 2021 Huldai announced that the party would not contest the elections, having failed to reach an electoral agreement with other parties.
