= The Greens (Israel) =

Political party in Israel

The Greens הירוקים
- Leader: 1997-2011: Pe'er Visner
- Founded: 1997
- Ideology: Environmentalism; Sustainability

Election symbol
- רק

Website
- www.green-party.co.il

The Greens (Hebrew: הַיְּרוּקִים, romanized: HaYerukim) is a minor political party in Israel that emphasizes environment protection and quality of life. It was founded and formerly headed by Pe'er Visner. Although the party was never represented in the Knesset, it holds seats in many municipalities across Israel.

== History ==
The Greens were established in 1997. In the 1999 Knesset elections the party received 0.4% of the vote, failing to win a seat. They received the same share of the vote in the 2003 elections.

In the 2006 elections, the party received 47,595 votes (1.52%). However, it was not enough to pass the 2% threshold, and they were ultimately the largest party not to obtain seats in the Knesset (Balad, with 72,066 votes, was the smallest party to obtain seats). Had the electoral threshold not been raised from 1.5% in 2003, they would have won seats.

Substantial gains in the 2008 municipal elections saw the Greens win over 50 seats across 22 municipalities. In Haifa, where former Green candidate Yona Yahav was re-elected for a second mayoral term, the Greens won four seats, while in Tel Aviv, where Green Party chair Pe'er Visner was deputy mayor, the Greens won three seats.

The Greens campaigned intensively for the 2009 Knesset elections. Some polls by a number of national newspapers had predicted that the party could win around 2–3 seats, putting Greens in the Knesset for the first time. However, a rival green party, the Green Movement was established in 2008, running in alliance with Meimad. The Greens received only 0.4% of the vote, again failing to pass the electoral threshold, whilst the Green Movement and Meimad received 0.8% of the vote.

In the 2013 elections the party's vote share dropped to 0.2%, and again to 0.07% in the 2015 elections.

== Election results ==
Election	Votes	%	seats
1999	13,292	0.4	0
2003	12,833	0.41	0
2006	47,595	1.52	0
2009	12,378	0.37	0
2013	8,190	0.22	0
2015	2,992	0.07	0
