= Tzvia Greenfield =

Israeli politician

- צביה גרינפילד
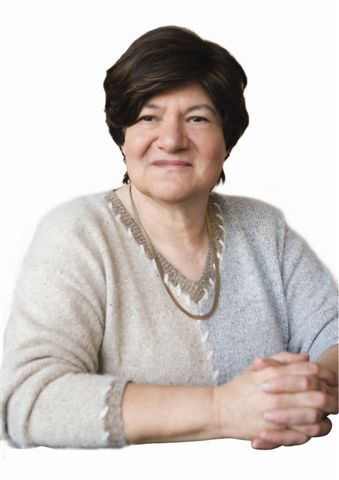

Faction represented in the Knesset
- 2008–2009: Meretz

Personal details
- Born: 27 October 1945 (age 80) Jerusalem, Mandatory Palestine

Tzvia Greenfield (Hebrew: צביה גרינפילד; born 27 October 1945) is an Israeli politician and a former Member of the Knesset for Meretz. She was the first ex Haredi woman to be an MK.

== Biography ==
Greenfield was born in Jerusalem in 1945. She grew up in a Haredi family and attended Bais Yaakov schools. She earned an M.A. in philosophy and history at Hebrew University of Jerusalem, and later a Ph.D. in political philosophy. She became politically active in the early 1990s. In 1993, she established the Mifneh ["pivot point"] Institute to promote peace, tolerance, and democracy in Orthodox society. She was one of the founders of Orthodox Women for the Sanctity of Life, which opposed the Israeli occupation of South Lebanon. Greenfield is a member of the Board of Directors of B'tselem and was among the signatories of the Geneva accords. She wrote the book 'They Are Afraid': How the Orthodox and Ultra-Orthodox Became the Leading Force in Israel. She lives in Har Nof, and her five children attend Orthodox Zionist schools.

In 2006, Greenfield decided to pursue a parliamentary career. She was on the Meretz list for the 17th Knesset and was ranked sixth in an internal vote by 700 of Meretz's 1,000 central committee members, after Chair Yossi Beilin, Ran Cohen, Avshalom Vilan, Zehava Gal-On, and Haim Oron. Meretz received five seats. On 4 November 2008, Greenfield replaced Beilin, who retired from politics, and became the first Haredi woman sworn into the Knesset. Prior to the 2009 elections, she again won sixth place on the Meretz list. However, she lost her seat in the February 2009 elections, as the party's representation was reduced to three seats.

Greenfield opposes the Israeli occupation of Palestinian territories and supports a two-state solution to the Israeli–Palestinian conflict along the Green Line with "minor adjustments". She describes herself as a social democrat and a supporter of a strong welfare state. She does not follow any rabbis, claiming that contemporary Israeli rabbis do not advance the interests of their followers. She also accused them of not preparing their followers for the Gazan disengagement plan. She remains Orthodox, rather than choosing Reform Judaism or Conservative Judaism, because she believes in continuity, feels close to Jewish tradition and history, and is committed to observing Halacha.

Greenfield considers herself an Orthodox woman with similar values to those of the United States and Europe, accepting separation of church and state, which she believes is necessary in Israel as well in order to save Judaism. She supports gay rights and gay marriage. In her book, she accuses the Haredi sector of using child benefits as a source of income. She uses elevators on Shabbat, and has a pet dog. She has stirred controversy among the Haredim, and Haredi journalist Kobi Arieli claimed that she is not truly Haredi because she has a dog, and that "real Haredim" hate Meretz.

== Publications ==
- They are afraid: how the religious and ultra-religious right became the leading factor in Israel (Yediot Aharanot/Tamar, 2001).
