= Yael Dayan =

Israeli politician and author (1939–2024)

- יעל דיין
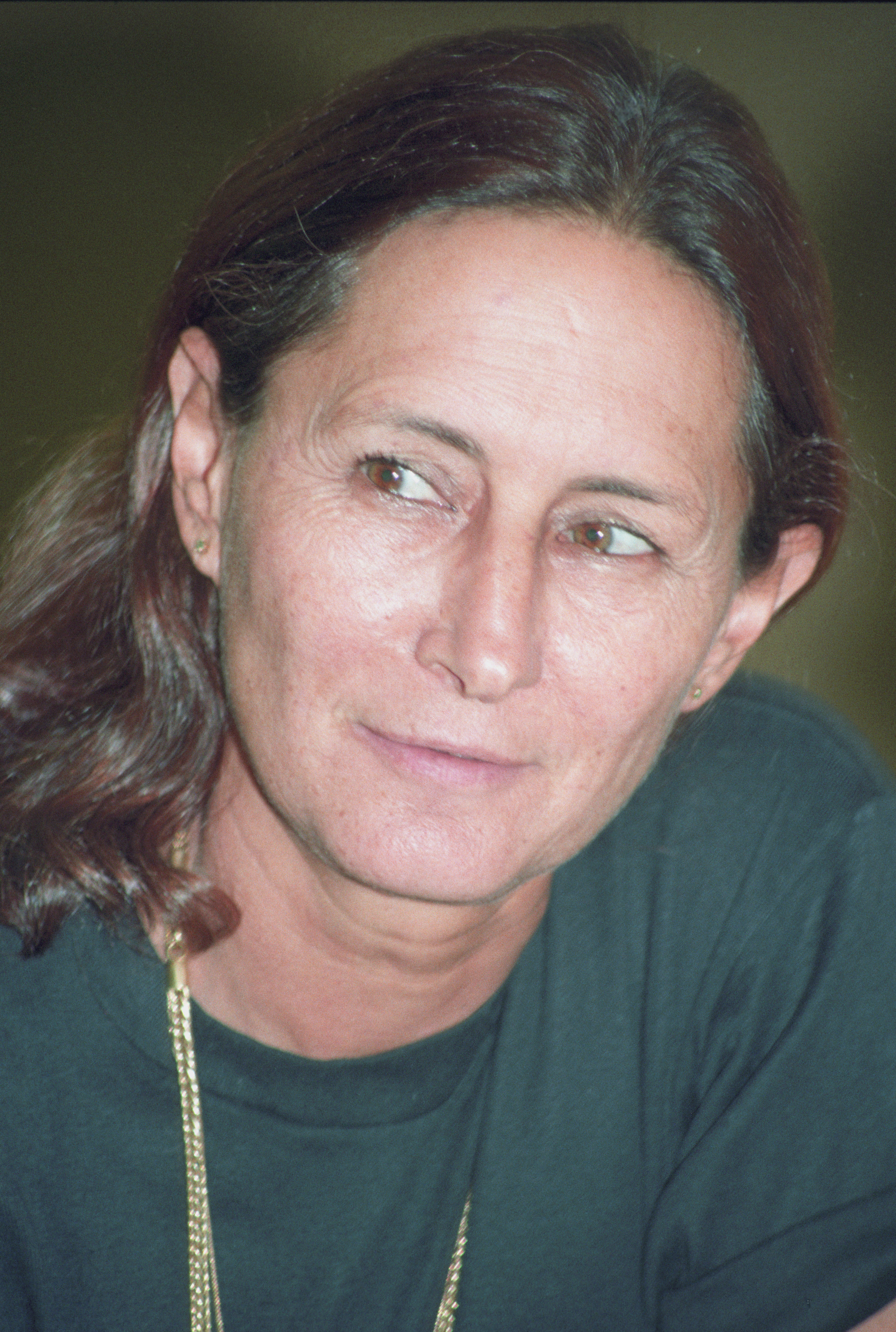
- Dayan in 1992

Faction represented in the Knesset
- 1992–1999: Labor Party
- 1999–2001: One Israel
- 2001–2003: Labor Party

Personal details
- Born: 12 February 1939 Nahalal, Mandatory Palestine
- Died: 18 May 2024 (aged 85) Tel Aviv, Israel
- Children: 2

Yael Dayan (Hebrew: יעל דיין; 12 February 1939 – 18 May 2024), also known as Yaël Dayan, was an Israeli politician and author. She served as a member of the Knesset between 1992 and 2003, and from 2008 to 2013 was the chair of Tel Aviv city council. Her service on the city council ended with the 2013 election. She was the daughter of Moshe Dayan and the sister of Assaf (Assi) and Ehud (Udi) Dayan.

== Early life and education ==
Dayan was born in Nahalal during the Mandatory Palestine, the daughter of Moshe Dayan and Ruth Schwartz, granddaughter of Shmuel Dayan. She attended Tichon Hadash high school in Tel Aviv. After serving in the IDF as a captain in the Spokesperson's Unit, Dayan studied international relations at the Hebrew University of Jerusalem and biology at the Open University of Israel.

== Career ==
Between 1959 and 1967, Dayan was in a relationship with Greek Cypriot theatre and film director, writer, producer, and actor Michael Cacoyannis and lived in Greece. She later married Dov Sion, with whom she had two children. Dayan died from lung disease on 18 May 2024, at the age of 85.

== Literary career ==
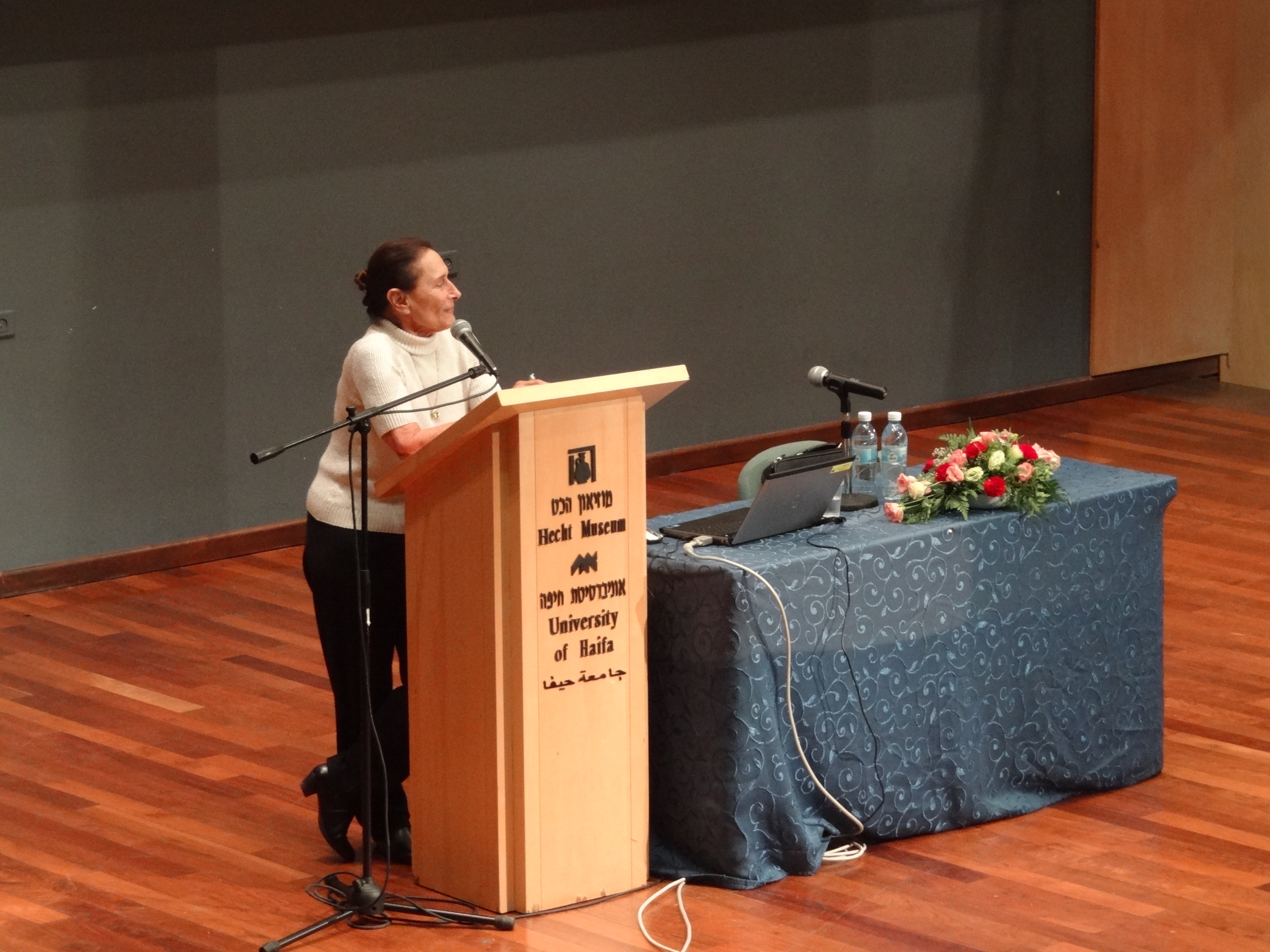
Yael Dayan gives a lecture at the University of Haifa on 12 November 2014 in the program Women's Studies and Gender

Dayan first made a name for herself as an author and newspaper columnist, writing columns for Yedioth Ahronoth, Maariv, Al HaMishmar, and Davar. She published five novels as well as a memoir of the Six-Day War called Israel Journal: June 1967 and a biography of her father titled My Father, His Daughter.

== Political career ==
Dayan became a peace activist, joining the leadership of Peace Now, and was also involved in Bat Shalom, the International Center for Peace and the Council for Peace and Security, giving lectures around the world on the topics of peace and security. In Israel, she campaigned for human rights, women's rights, and LGBT rights.

In 1992, Dayan was elected to the Knesset on the Labor Party list and served as chairwoman of the Committee on the Status of Women. She was instrumental in pushing forward Israel's sexual harassment law in the 1990s. Re-elected in 1996 and 1999 (as a member of One Israel, an alliance of Labor, Meimad and Gesher), Dayan became chairwoman of the Committee on the Status of Women for a second time in 1999.

After winning a low slot on Labor's electoral list in the 2003 primary, Dayan left Labor alongside Yossi Beilin and joined Beilin's Shahar Movement. The Movement ran jointly with Meretz in the 2003 election, with Dayan receiving the 12 slot on the joint list. Dayan was not elected as the list won only 6 seats.

Dayan headed the Meretz list in the Tel Aviv municipal elections in 2004, with the party winning 5 out of 31 Seats on council and joining Ron Huldai's coalition. Until 2008 she served as Deputy Mayor and until 2013 she was responsible for social services. Huldai chose not to include Dayan on his list of candidates for the 2013 election, effectively ending her political career.

== Published works ==
=== Fiction ===
- New Face in the Mirror – 1959
- Envy The Frightened – 1961
- Dust – 1963
- Death Had Two Sons – 1967
- Three Weeks in the Fall – 1979

=== Non-fiction ===
- The Promised Land: Memoirs of Shmuel Dayan (editor) – 1961
- Israel Journal: June 1967 (also known as A Soldier's Diary) – 1967
- My Father, His Daughter – 1985
