= 2012 Meretz leadership election =

Election for leader of the Meretz Party

- 7 February 2012
- Turnout: 87.53%
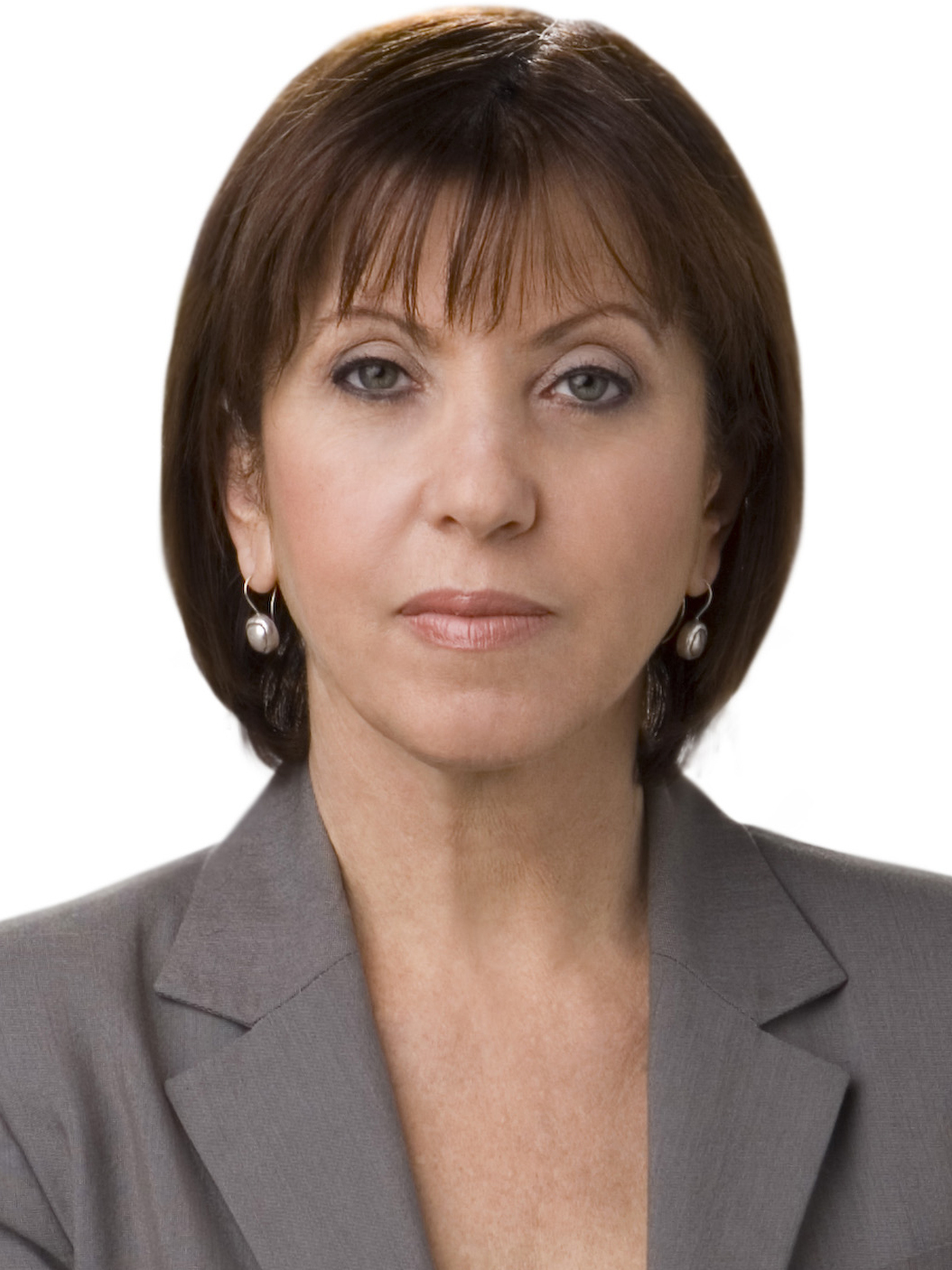

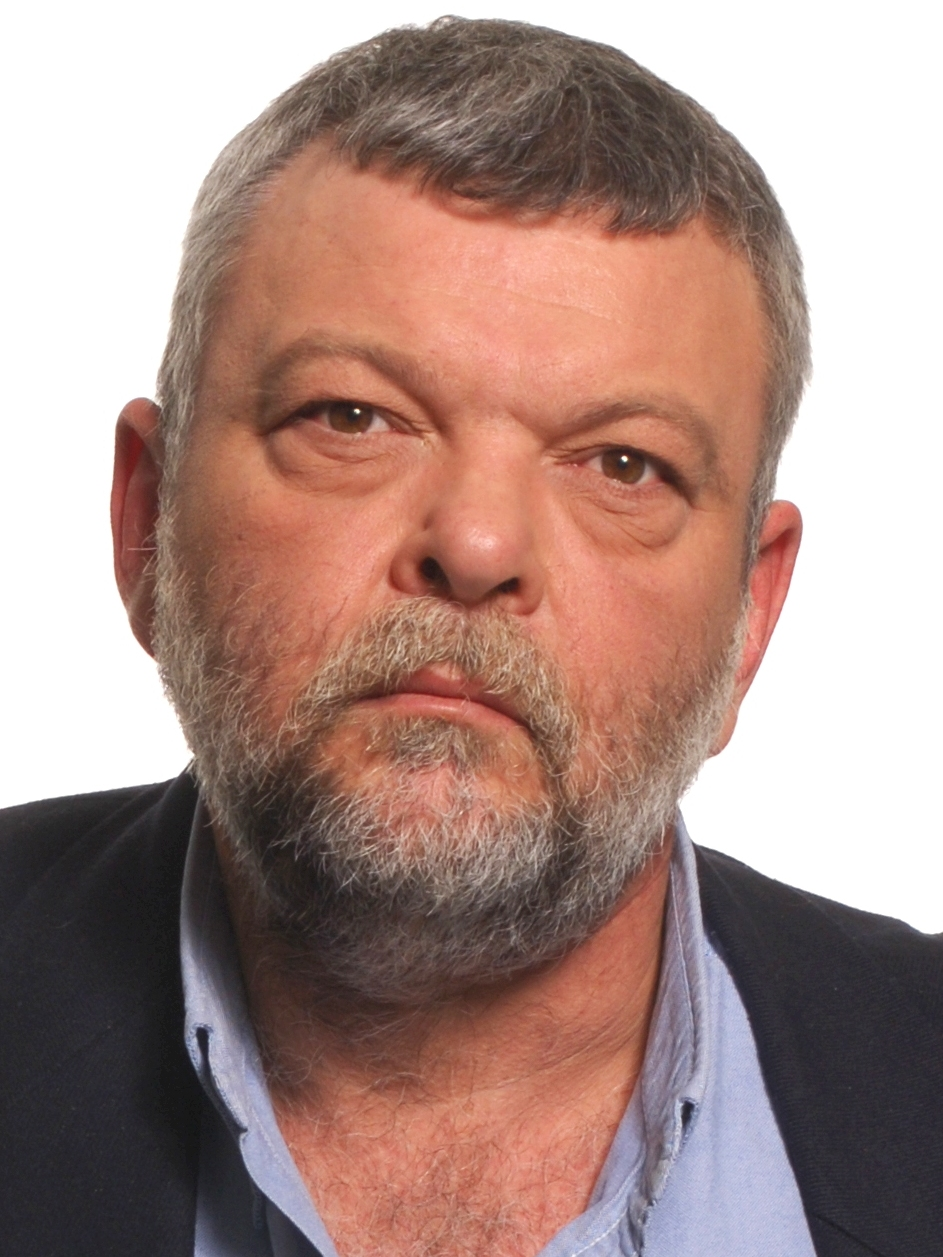
Candidate	Zehava Galon	Ilan Gilon
Party	Meretz	Meretz
Popular vote	835	506
Percentage	60.60%	36.65%
Leader before election
Haim Oron
Elected Leader
Zehava Galon

The 2012 Meretz leadership election was held on 7 February 2012 in which party convention delegates elected Zehava Galon as the party's leader.

== Candidates ==
- Zehava Galon, member of the Knesset since 1999 and candidate for party leadership in 2008
- Ilan Gilon Member of the Knesset (1999–2003 and since 2009)
- Ori Ophir, Party activist and youth leader

== Electorate ==
Unlike the previous two Meretz party leadership elections, the 2012 election was not open to the party's general membership. Instead, its electorate was limited to delegates at the party's convention. 835 of the convention's 954 delegates ultimately participated in the election, making for a turnout of 87.53%.

== Results ==
2012 Meretz leadership election
Party	Candidate	Votes	%
Meretz	Zehava Galon	835	60.60
Meretz	Ilan Gilon	506	36.65
Meretz	Ori Ophir	23	2.75
Total votes		835	100
Turnout			87.53
