= Shahar Movement =

Shahar Movement תנועת שח"ר
- Leader: Yossi Beilin
- Founded: June 2002
- Dissolved: 2004
- Merged into: Meretz
- Political position: Left-wing
- Most MKs: 0 (2003-2004)

Website
- http://www.shahar-movement.co.il/

The Shahar Movement (Hebrew: תנועת שח"ר, romanized: Tnuat Shaha"r, lit. 'Dawn Movement') (Note: The 'Shahar' in 'Shahar Movement' is an Acronym, and stands for "Peace, Education, Welfare" (Hebrew: שלום, חינוך, רווחה, romanized: Shalom, Hinuch, Revacha)) was an Israeli extraparliamentary movement and political party founded by Yossi Beilin to bring about a union of left-wing parties.

== History ==
Beilin founded the Shahar Movement in 2002, with the stated purpose of uniting Israel's left-wing parties. Beilin initially remained in the Labor party, but secured a low slot on the party's electoral list in the 2003 primaries, and thus left the party with Yael Dayan.

Shahar registered as a political party in December 2002. Several new members joined the party, including former Member of the Knesset Hagai Meirom, author Tzvia Greenfield, former Israeli Ambassador to the United Nations Yohanan Bein, former Israeli Ambassador to France Élie Barnavi, former IDF Officer Doron Kadmiel and former Mayor of Bayt Jann Ramsey Halabi. Shortly thereafter, the party announced a joint run with Meretz and the Democratic Choice in the 2003 Knesset election. The agreement allotted Beilin and Dayan, representing Shahar, the 11th and 12th slots on the joint list. The two were not elected as the list won only 6 seats.

The Shahar Movement merged with Meretz in 2004 to form Yachad, later renamed Meretz-Yachad. Beilin was elected to lead the new movement later that year, defeating MK Ran Cohen in an internal leadership contest.
