= Yossi Sarid =

Israeli politician (1940–2015)

- יוסי שריד
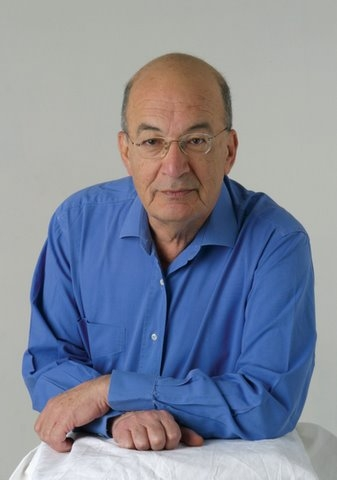

Leader of the Opposition
- In office 7 March 2001 – 4 November 2002
- Prime Minister: Ariel Sharon
- Preceded by: Ariel Sharon
- Succeeded by: Binyamin Ben-Eliezer

Ministerial roles
- 1992–1996: Minister of the Environment
- 1999–2000: Minister of Education

Faction represented in the Knesset
- 1974–1984: Alignment
- 1984–1992: Ratz
- 1992–2006: Meretz

Personal details
- Born: 24 October 1940 Rehovot, Mandatory Palestine
- Died: 4 December 2015 (aged 75) Tel Aviv, Israel

Yossi Sarid (Hebrew: יוסי שריד; 24 October 1940 – 4 December 2015) was an Israeli politician and news commentator. He served as a member of the Knesset for the Alignment, Ratz and Meretz between 1974 and 2006. A former Minister of Education and Minister of the Environment, he led Meretz between 1996 and 2003 and served as Leader of the Opposition from 2001 to 2003. Known for his determined moral stance and his willingness to pay the political price for that determination, Sarid was often referred to as Israel's moral compass.

== Biography ==
Yosef (Yossi) Sarid was born in Rehovot, Sarid served in the Artillery Corps and as a Military Correspondent during his national service in the IDF. He earned an MA in political science from New School for Social Research in New York City. He was a resident of Margaliyot in the Upper Galilee.

Sarid was married to Dorit, with whom he had three children, including the writer Yishai Sarid. He died on the evening of 4 December 2015 from an apparent heart attack. He is buried in Kibbutz Givat Hashlosha cemetery, on the outskirts of Tel Aviv.

== Political and journalism career ==
Sarid worked as a media aide to Prime Minister Levi Eshkol. He was first elected to the Knesset in 1973 on the Alignment list. He was re-elected in 1977, 1981 and 1984. After the Alignment agreed to join a national unity government with Likud in 1984, Sarid left the party on 22 October to join Shulamit Aloni's Ratz. He was re-elected on the Ratz list in 1988.

In 1992, Ratz merged with Shinui and Mapam to form Meretz. The new party won 12 seats in the elections that year and joined Yitzhak Rabin's coalition. Sarid was appointed Minister of the Environment, a position he kept when Shimon Peres formed a new government after Rabin's assassination in 1995.

In 1996, Sarid replaced Aloni as Meretz leader. Although the Labor Party won the most seats in elections that year, Likud leader Benjamin Netanyahu won the special election for Prime Minister and formed a right-wing government.

Sarid was reelected as leader of Meretz in 1999. In the 1999 Knesset election, Meretz won 10 seats. Despite Meretz centring their election campaign on their opposition to ultra-Orthodox Shas, Ehud Barak persuaded Sarid to join the government, making him Minister of Education. Sarid explained the breaking of his vow in the need to promote the peace process. However, in 2000 Sarid resigned from the government and Meretz quit the coalition after failing to agree on authority to be given for Shas deputy minister of education.

In the 2003 elections, Meretz was reduced to 6 seats, after which Sarid resigned as party leader, to be replaced by Yossi Beilin. He remained a member of the Knesset until the 2006 elections, when Meretz was reduced to 5 seats, after which he retired from politics, a plan he had announced the previous year. In 2009, Meretz's presence was further reduced to three seats in the Knesset.

Throughout Sarid's career, he was a strong opponent of the religious political forces. He drew the particular ire of Shas's chief rabbi, Ovadia Yosef, who compared him to the biblical character Haman, who decreed the extermination of Jews.

Sarid wrote a weekly column for Haaretz newspaper.
