= Negba =

Kibbutz in southern Israel

Negba: נגבה (Hebrew); نجبا (Arabic)
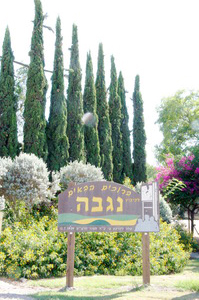

- Location within Ashkelon region of Israel
- Coordinates: 31°39′39″N 34°40′59″E
- Country: Israel
- District: Southern
- Subdistrict: Ashkelon
- Council: Yoav
- Affiliation: Kibbutz Movement
- Founded: 12 July 1939
- Founder: Hashomer Hatzair members
- Population (2024): 881
- Website: www.negba.org.il

Negba (Hebrew: נֶגְבָּה) is a kibbutz in southern Israel. Located in the northern Negev desert near the cities of Kiryat Malakhi and Ashkelon, it falls under the jurisdiction of Yoav Regional Council. In 2024 it had a population of 881.

The name of the kibbutz is based on a verse in the Book of Genesis (13:14), where God commands Abraham to cast his eyes and travel throughout the land of Israel, toward the north, south, east and west. The word "negba" means "southward" in Biblical Hebrew.

== History ==
=== Foundation ===
Kibbutz Negba was founded on 12 July 1939 as part of the tower and stockade enterprise. The first settlers were members of Hashomer Hatzair from Poland. It was the southernmost Jewish settlement in Mandatory Palestine.

=== Battle for Negba, 1948 ===
In the 1948 Arab–Israeli War, the Israeli military engaged in many battles with Egypt. When the Egyptians invaded on 15 May 1948, their forces advanced and captured the police station, Iraq-Suweidan, a Tegart fort named after the nearby Arab village, that controlled the route to the Negev. Aside from the police station, the Egyptians seized Arab villages near the kibbutz, from which they attacked Jewish vehicles travelling on the roads from Ashkelon to Hebron and Jerusalem.

The kibbutz was destroyed in the heavy fighting which went on for three months. On 9 November 1948, after the defeat of the Egyptian army in Operation Yoav, the police station was captured by the Israel Defense Forces.

A memorial to the fallen soldiers was constructed next to the military cemetery: a man and a woman from the kibbutz with a fighting soldier. Next to the memorial statue stands an Egyptian tank. The kibbutz water tower, pockmarked with bullet holes, is a testimony to the fierce battle.

=== Gallery ===
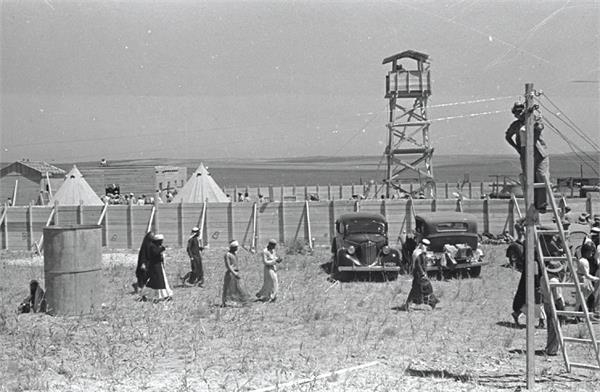
Negba foundation 1939

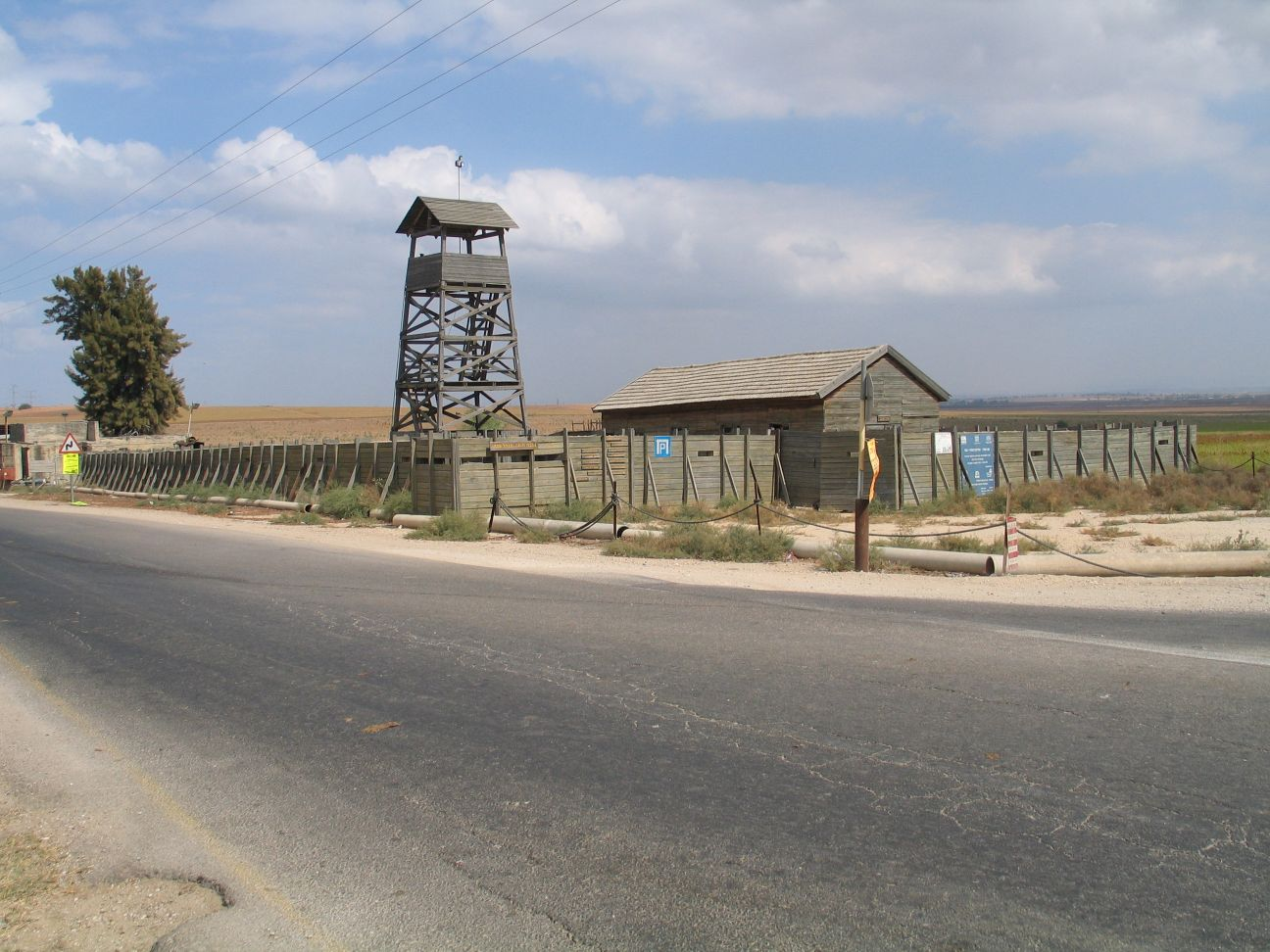
Tower and stockade replica

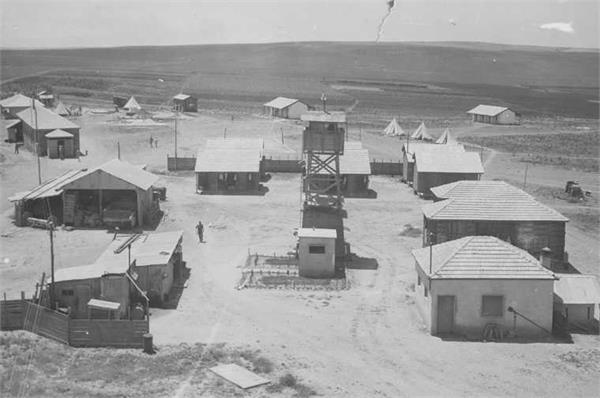
Negba 1942

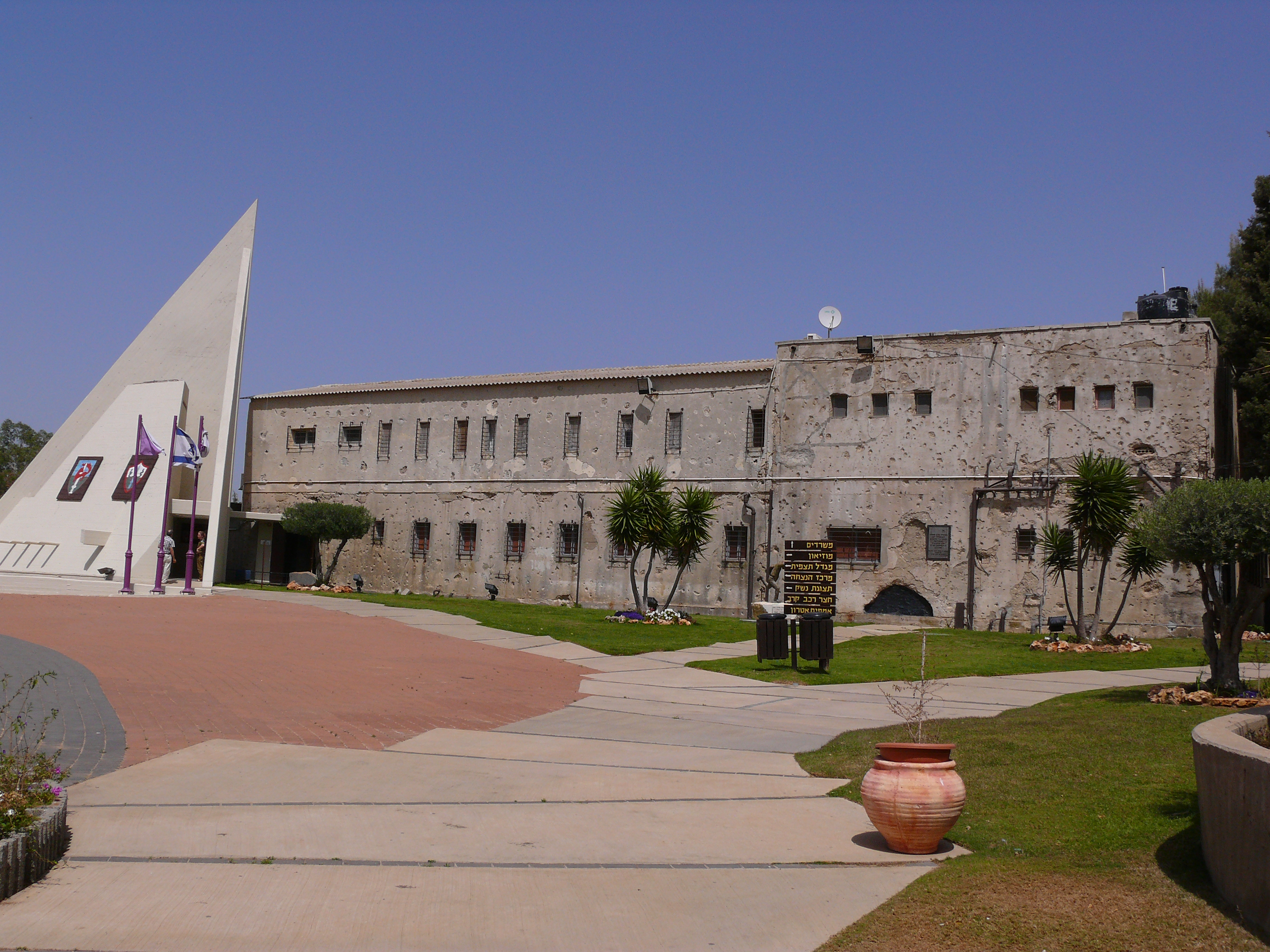
"Meztudat Yoav", the former Iraq Suweidan police station

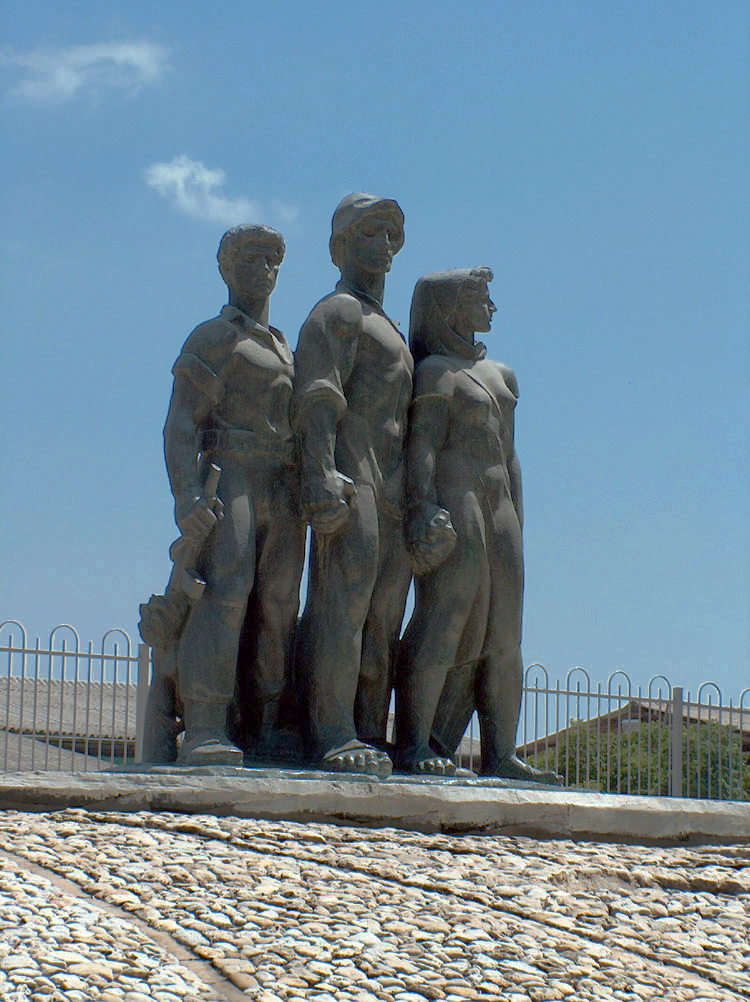
Nathan Rapoport, memorial to the participants in the 1948 battles

== Economy ==
The kibbutz economy is based on poultry, cattle, orchards, vegetables and two factories. It also has a history museum featuring a reconstructed model of the tower and stockade settlements. Negba, along with Sde Yoav, operate Hamei Yoav, a spa with hot springs and thermo-mineral baths.

Under a new financial arrangement, members who left the kibbutz are able to return as "economically independent members." They live in residences registered in their own name and are partners with equal rights and obligations in the communal element of the kibbutz (education, culture, welfare and infrastructure) but not in the productive assets (agriculture, industrial enterprises and shares in the dairy cooperative Tnuva).

== Geography ==
=== Climate ===
Climate data for Negba (Temperature: 1995–2010, Precipitation: 1980-2010)
Month	Jan	Feb	Mar	Apr	May	Jun	Jul	Aug	Sep	Oct	Nov	Dec	Year
Record high °C (°F)	33.0 (91.4)	32.4 (90.3)	37.7 (99.9)	42.0 (107.6)	46.5 (115.7)	42.0 (107.6)	38.4 (101.1)	39.0 (102.2)	42.4 (108.3)	41.6 (106.9)	36.0 (96.8)	33.0 (91.4)	46.5 (115.7)
Mean daily maximum °C (°F)	17.6 (63.7)	18.2 (64.8)	20.7 (69.3)	24.6 (76.3)	27.8 (82.0)	30.0 (86.0)	31.7 (89.1)	31.9 (89.4)	30.8 (87.4)	28.1 (82.6)	24.3 (75.7)	19.9 (67.8)	25.5 (77.8)
Daily mean °C (°F)	12.9 (55.2)	13.3 (55.9)	15.3 (59.5)	18.4 (65.1)	21.5 (70.7)	24.3 (75.7)	26.5 (79.7)	26.9 (80.4)	25.7 (78.3)	23.0 (73.4)	18.9 (66.0)	15.0 (59.0)	20.1 (68.2)
Mean daily minimum °C (°F)	8.3 (46.9)	8.3 (46.9)	9.9 (49.8)	12.3 (54.1)	15.2 (59.4)	18.6 (65.5)	21.3 (70.3)	22.0 (71.6)	20.6 (69.1)	17.9 (64.2)	13.5 (56.3)	12.1 (53.8)	15.0 (59.0)
Record low °C (°F)	−2.5 (27.5)	−1.5 (29.3)	0 (32)	2.5 (36.5)	6.0 (42.8)	11.5 (52.7)	15.0 (59.0)	14.0 (57.2)	12.8 (55.0)	9.0 (48.2)	1.0 (33.8)	−2.6 (27.3)	−2.6 (27.3)
Average rainfall mm (inches)	119 (4.7)	105 (4.1)	55 (2.2)	11 (0.4)	3.2 (0.13)	0 (0)	0 (0)	0 (0)	2.3 (0.09)	26 (1.0)	66 (2.6)	103 (4.1)	490.5 (19.32)
Average rainy days (≥ 0.1 mm)	11	10	7	2	0.7	0.1	0	0	0.2	3	6	9	49
Source: Israel Meteorological Service

== Notable residents ==
- Giora Epstein (20 May 1938 – 19 July 2025), Israeli Air Force (IAF) officer and fighter ace
- Yossi Peled (born 1941), Israeli general and politician
- Anat Maor (born 1945), Israeli politician
- Avshalom Vilan (born 1951), Israeli politician and economist
