= Ali Salalha =

Israeli Druze politician

- علي صلالحة
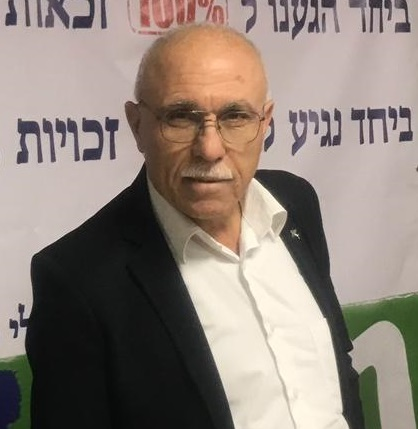
- Salalha in 2019

Faction represented in the Knesset
- 2021–2022: Meretz

Personal details
- Born: 12 April 1952 (age 74) Beit Jann, Israel
- Party: Democrats (since 2024)
- Other political affiliations: Mapam (1970–1997); Meretz (1997–2024)
- Children: 5
- Occupation: Teacher • Politician

Ali Salalha (Hebrew: עלי סלאלחה, Arabic: علي صلالحة; born 12 April 1952) is an Israeli Druze politician who served as a member of the Knesset for Meretz from 2021 to 2022.

== Early life and education ==
Salalha's hometown is Beit Jann, a Druze village on Mount Meron in northern Israel.

Prior to entering politics, Salalha was the principal of Beit Jann Comprehensive High School.

== Political career ==
A member of Meretz, Salalha was placed fifth on the Party's electoral list for the April 2019 elections, but was not elected as it won four seats. He was then a Democratic Union candidate for the September 2019 elections, but quit the alliance on 7 September 2019 in protest at Ehud Barak's inclusion on its list.

He was placed ninth on the Meretz list for the March 2021 elections. Although he initially missed out on a seat as the party won six seats, he entered the Knesset on 18 July 2021 as a replacement for Issawi Frej, who had resigned under the Norwegian Law after being appointed Minister of Regional Cooperation. He was placed fourth on the Meretz list for the 2022 elections, in which the party did not win any seats.

In 2026, he was placed eighteenth on the Democrats list for the 2026 Israeli legislative election.
