= Meretz Youth =

Youth organization of the Meretz political party

Meretz Youth נוער מרצ
- Chairperson: Ben Hosen
- Headquarters: Tel Aviv
- Ideology: Progressivism; Secularism; Pacifism
- International affiliation: International Union of Socialist Youth (IUSY)
- European affiliation: Young European Socialists (YES)
- Website: meretz.org.il/פועלים-במרצ/נוער-מרצ/

Meretz Youth (Hebrew: נוער מרצ, Noar Meretz) is the youth wing of the Israeli political party Meretz. The organization was founded in 1992, after the union between the Israeli political parties Mapam and Ratz. The first coordinator of Meretz Youth was Ilan Gilon.

Meretz Youth opened branches in Tel Aviv, Ramat Gan, Petah Tikva, Ashdod, Kiryat Ono, Beersheba, Kfar Saba, Hertzliyah, Haifa, Givatayim, Rishon LeZion, Bat Yam, Pardes Hana and Jerusalem. In their branches, the organization combines cultural and political education with political activism.

The organization is presented also in Meretz's management. In the party's constitution, it was told that 2% of the management of the party must come from Meretz Youth.

Today, about 400 students between the ages 12–18 are members of Meretz Youth.

== Youth leading Youth ==
According to the organization, Meretz Youth is going with the idea of "Youth leading Youth", which means that the organization is led by their own youth members, and they are the ones who decide about their activities and campaigns.

== Meretz Youth's Management ==
The chairperson currently is Nina Banai Shahaf.

The chairman is deciding about the at Branches of activities and campaigns together with the organization's leadership. The chairman of Meretz Youth is elected once for a year, while the leadership is elected once for half a year.

History of Meretz Youth's logos
Meretz Youth first logo

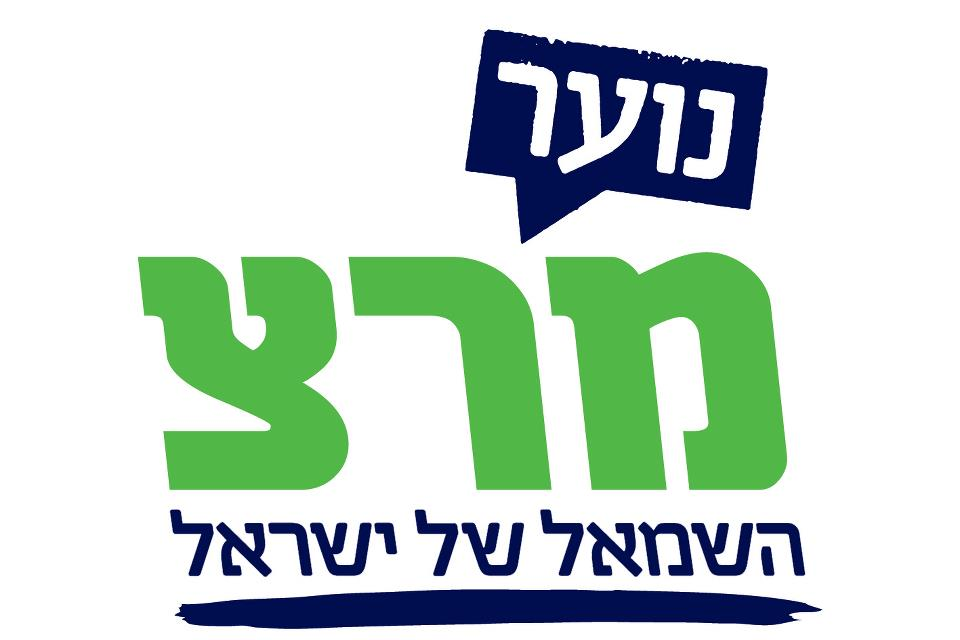
Meretz Youth logo (2010)

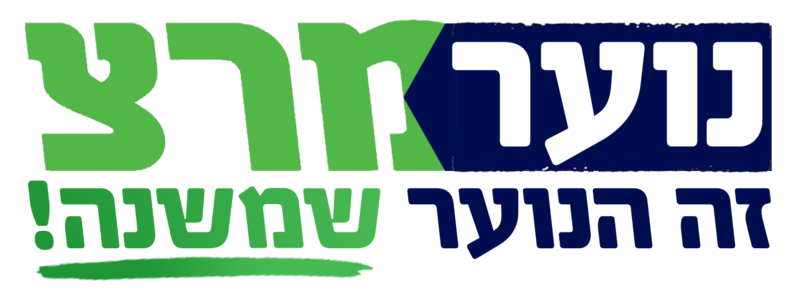
Meretz Youth logo (2013)

Meretz Youth current logo
