= Hussein Faris =

Israeli Arab former politician (1935–2021)

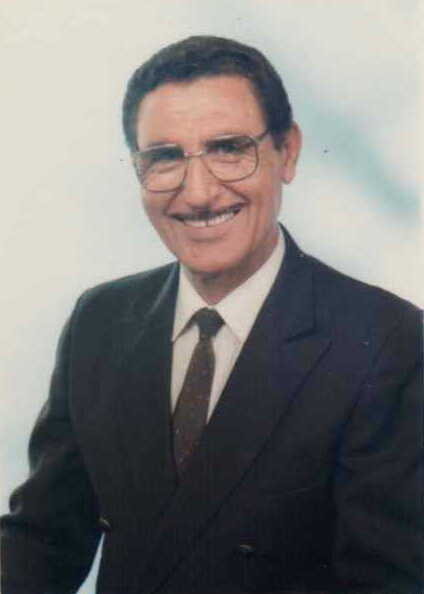
- Faris during his time in the Knesset

Faction represented in the Knesset
- 1988–1992: Mapam
- 1992: Meretz

Personal details
- Born: 18 September 1935 Sha'ab, Mandatory Palestine
- Died: 28 April 2021 (aged 85) Acre, Israel

Hussein Faris (Arabic: حسين فارس, Hebrew: חוסיין פארס; 18 September 1935 – 28 April 2021) was an Israeli Arab politician who served as a member of the Knesset for Mapam and Meretz between 1988 and 1992.

== Biography ==
Born in Sha'ab during the Mandate era, Faris attended high school in Kafr Yasif, before studying Middle Eastern studies and Arabic literature at the University of Haifa, earning a BA. During his youth he was a member of the Arab Pioneers movement and a member of the board of Hashomer Hatzair.

He went on to join Mapam, and became chief editor of the party's Arabic journal. In the 1988 elections he was elected to the Knesset on the party's list, and became a member of the Education and Culture Committee and the Committee for the Appointment of Qadis. He lost his seat in the 1992 elections shortly after Mapam merged into Meretz.

Faris was also a member of the board of the Teachers Union, and Chairman of the Committee Against Racism and for Co-existence in the Western Galilee.

Faris died in Acre in April 2021 at the age of 85.
