= David Zucker (politician) =

Israeli politician

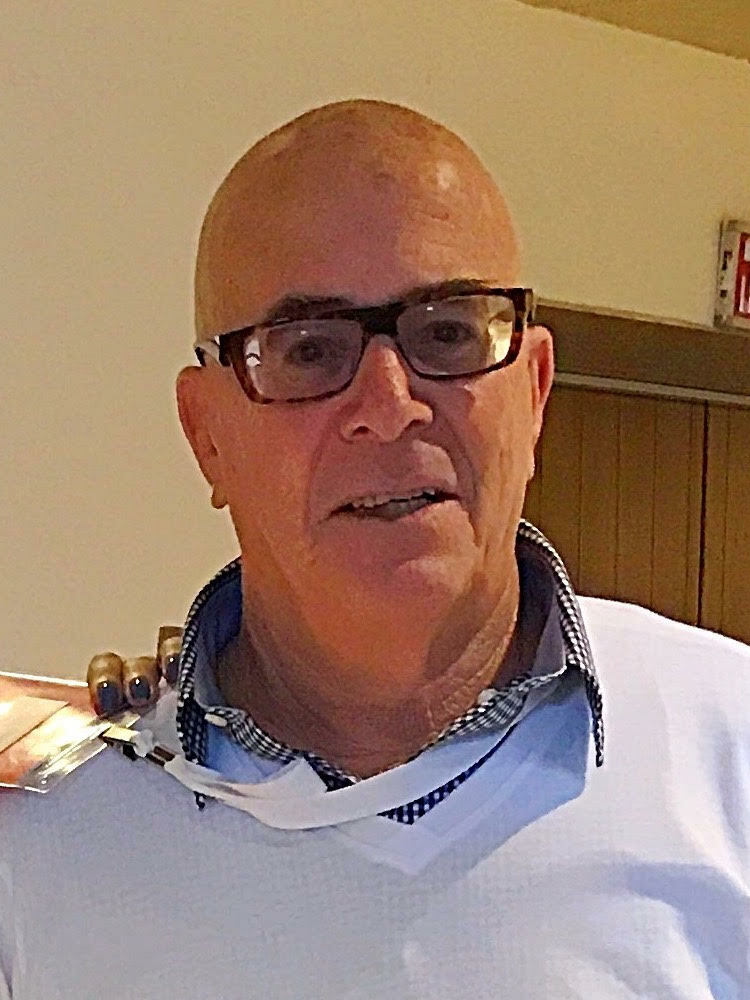

Faction represented in the Knesset
- 1986–1992: Ratz
- 1992–1999: Meretz
- 1999: Independent

Personal details
- Born: 11 September 1948 (age 76); Haifa, Israel

David "Dedi" Zucker (Hebrew: דוד צוקר; born 11 September 1948) is an Israeli peace activist and former politician who served as a member of the Knesset for Ratz, Meretz and as an independent between 1986 and 1999.

== Biography ==
Born in Haifa in 1948, Zucker studied at the Hebrew University of Jerusalem, gaining a BA and MA. He also studied towards a doctorate at Tel Aviv University. In 1978 he was amongst the founders of Peace Now, and between 1984 and 1988 served as secretary general of Ratz.

Zucker won a place on the Ratz list prior to the 1984 Knesset elections, but failed to win a seat. However, he entered the Knesset on 26 November 1986 as a replacement for Mordechai Bar-On, who had resigned. He was re-elected in 1988, the same year in which he helped found B'Tselem. He was re-elected again in 1992 (by which time Ratz had merged into Meretz) and 1996.

On 17 March 1999 he left Meretz to sit as an independent, after failing to win a realistic place on the Meretz list. Prior to the May 1999 elections he joined the Green Party and headed its list in the elections. However, it failed to cross the electoral threshold and he lost his seat.
