= Issawi Frej =

Arab-Israeli politician

- عيساوي فريج
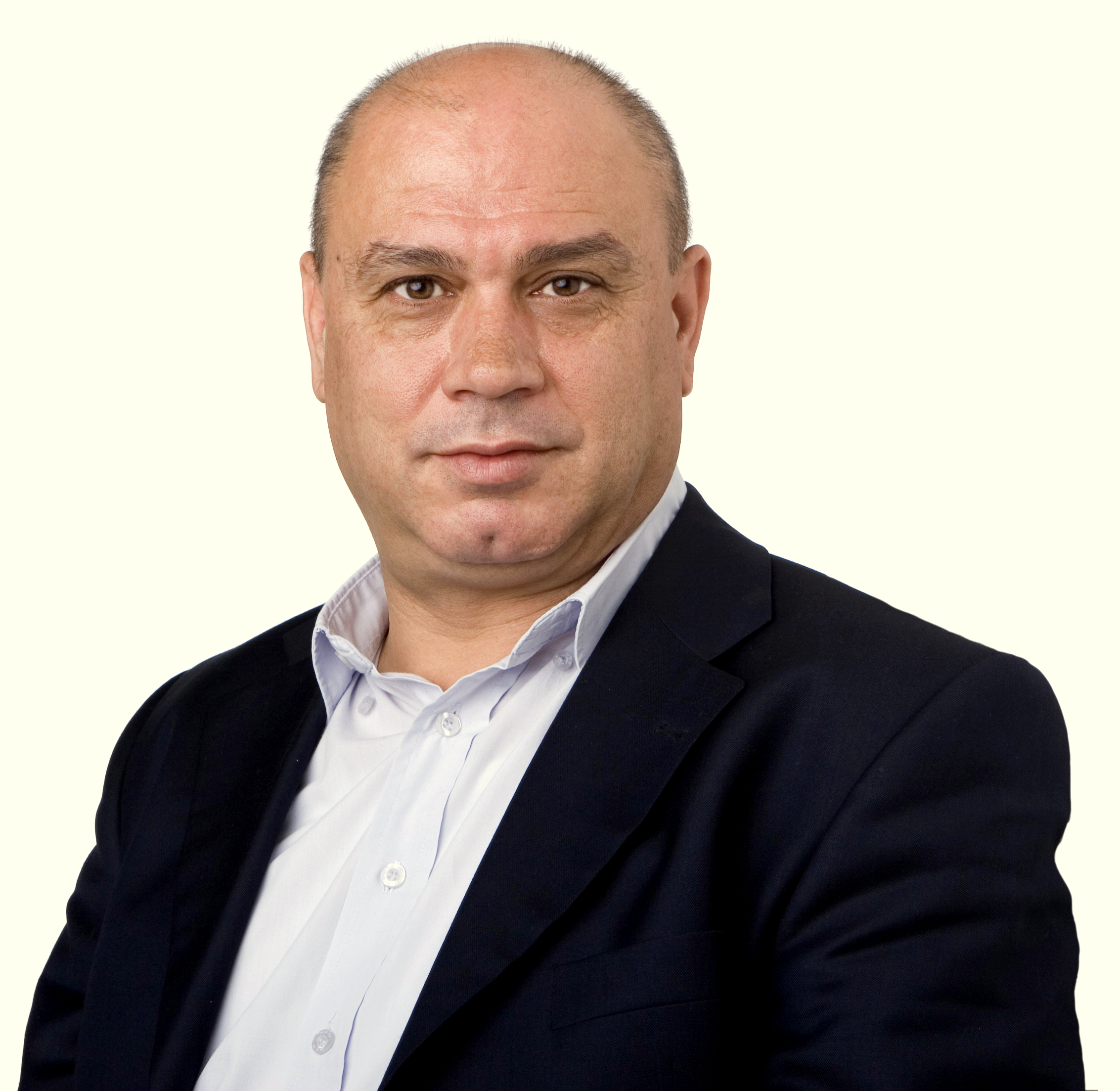

Ministerial roles
- 2021–2022: Minister of Regional Cooperation

Faction represented in the Knesset
- 2013–2019: Meretz
- 2021: Meretz

Personal details
- Born: 14 December 1963 (age 62) Kafr Qasim, Israel

Issawi Frej (Arabic: عيساوي فريج, Hebrew: עִיסָאוּוִי פְרֵיג'; born 14 December 1963) is an Arab-Israeli politician who served as a minister and was a member of the Knesset for Meretz in 2021 and was also an MK for the party between 2013 and 2019. As of June 2023, he was the Minister of Regional Cooperation. He is the second Muslim minister in Israeli history, after Raleb Majadle.

== Biography ==
Frej was born in Kafr Qasim, Israel, to a Muslim-Arab family. His grandfather was killed in the Kafr Qasim massacre, Frej is the eldest of twelve children. In 1982, he began studying accounting and economics at the Hebrew University of Jerusalem, and later worked as an accountant. Whilst at university, he joined the joint Jewish-Arab "Campus" group, and subsequently joined the Ratz party, which later merged into Meretz. He served on the secretariat of Peace Now, and was involved in the Geneva Accord.

Frej is married, with seven children. They reside in Kafr Qasim.

In February 2022, Frej was hospitalized in Tel Aviv after suffering a stroke.

== Political career ==
Frej first ran for the Knesset in 2003, and was placed sixteenth on the Meretz list for the elections that year. However, the party won only six seats. For the 2006 elections, he was placed seventh, but Meretz won only five seats. In the 2009 elections, he was placed ninth, but again failed to win a seat, as Meretz was reduced to three MKs. However, after being placed fifth on the party's list for the 2013 elections, he entered the Knesset, after the party won six seats. Frej was re-elected in the 2015 elections, after being placed third on the Meretz list. He was fourth on the party's list for the April 2019 elections, and was re-elected as the party won four seats.

In June 2021, he joined the coalition government as the Minister of Regional Cooperation. In July 2021, he resigned the Knesset under the Norwegian law. He was succeeded by Ali Salalha.

In October 2021, Frej met publicly with Nasredeen Abdulbari, then the Justice Minister of Sudan, one of the first public meetings between Israeli and Sudanese officials.

In November 2021, Frej met with Palestinian Authority Prime Minister Mohammed Shtayyeh to discuss the financial and security relationship between Israel and the West Bank; after this meeting, Frej predicted that the Palestinian Authority would agree to stop paying monthly stipends to those who have been convicted of terrorism and to the families of terrorists who have killed Israelis. After his retirement, he was placed honorary 117th place on the Meretz list on 2022 Israeli legislative election.

== Political positions ==
Frej is a supporter of the two-state solution. Frej is a supporter of the Abraham Accords, stating that he believes the accords offer Israel chances for economic growth; he suggested that further countries would also sign treaties normalizing relations with Israel.

On 1 February 2022, Frej rejected Amnesty International's charge that Israel is an apartheid state, saying: "Israel has many problems that must be solved, inside the Green Line and certainly in the occupied territories, but Israel is not an apartheid state."
