= Haim Oron =

Israeli politician

- חיים אורון
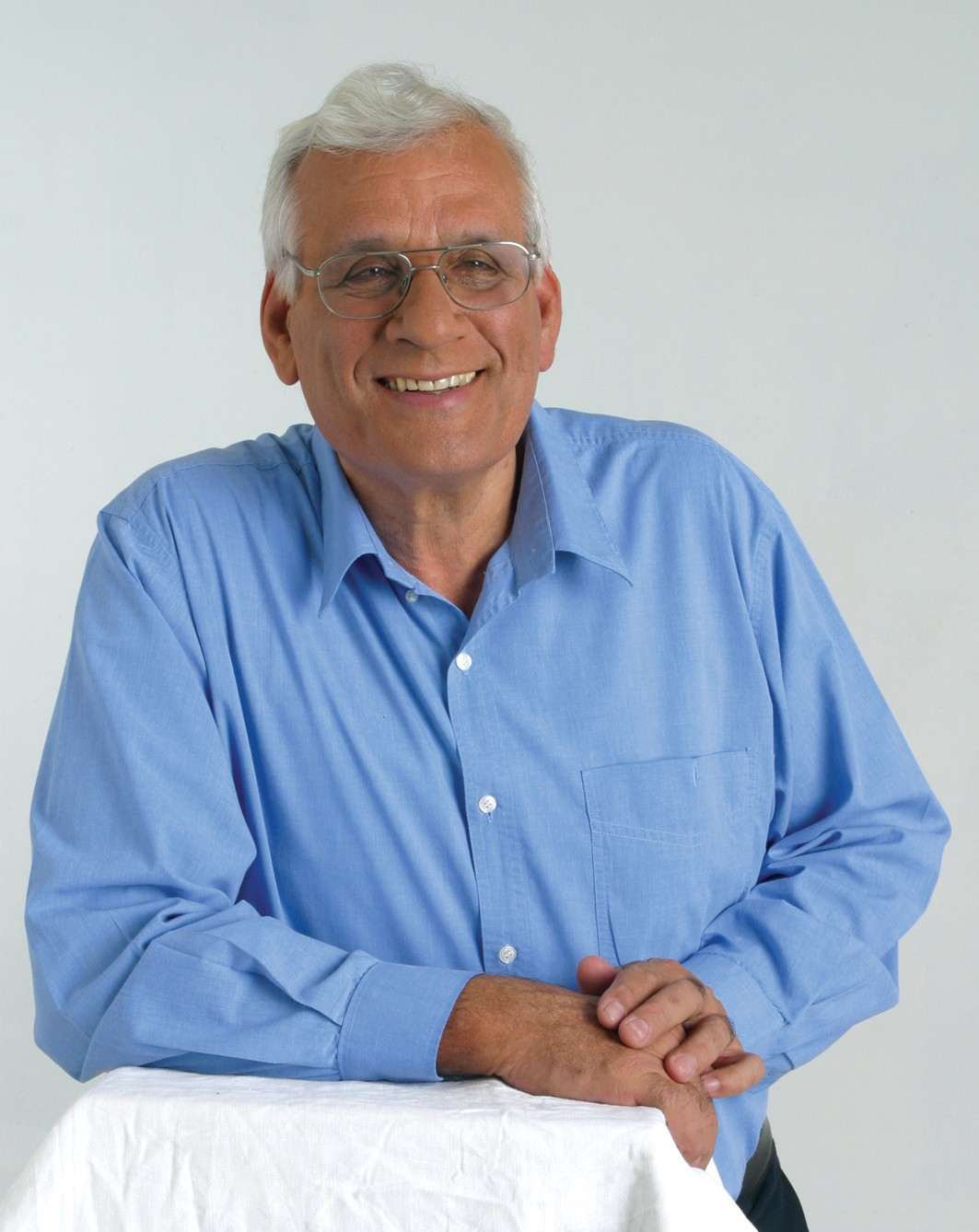

Ministerial roles
- 1999–2000: Minister of Agriculture

Faction represented in the Knesset
- 1988–1992: Mapam
- 1992–2000: Meretz
- 2003–2011: Meretz

Personal details
- Born: 26 March 1940 (age 85) Givatayim, Mandatory Palestine

Haim "Jumes" Oron (Hebrew: חיים "ג'ומס" אורון; born 26 March 1940) is an Israeli politician and former Minister of Agriculture. Oron led the political party Meretz between 2008 and 2011, and served as a member of the Knesset for it and its predecessor Mapam between 1988 and 2000, and again from 2003 to 2011.

== Biography ==
Oron was born in Givatayim and grew up in Ramat Gan. His parents emigrated from Poland before World War II. His father was a textile worker and his mother a housewife. His nickname as a boy was "Jamus" (water buffalo) and later, "Jumes" (sycamore fruit). He attended Tichon Hadash high school in Tel Aviv.

Oron served in the Israel Defense Forces with the airborne Nahal unit. During his military service, he and his wife Nili joined kibbutz Lahav, where he taught in the high school and worked in various branches of the kibbutz economy (poultry, field crops, sausage factory, plastics factory). He was a member of the kibbutz committee and served as executive secretary. In 1968, he became secretary of the Hashomer Hatzair movement. He was national secretary of Kibbutz Artzi twice.

Oron had five children - Irit, Uri, Yaniv, Assaf and Oded. Yaniv died in a tractor accident at the age of 4. Oron and his wife continue to live on the kibbutz, and his benefits as an ex-Knesset member and ex-Minister go into the collective treasury.

=== Political career ===
Oron was one of the founders of Peace Now (1978). He was first elected to the Knesset as a member of Mapam in 1988. In 1992, Mapam formed Meretz, a political alliance with Ratz and Shinui which later merged into a single party. In the thirteenth Knesset, he was chairman of the Ethics Committee.

He joined Haim Ramon in his bid for the Histadrut leadership, and after Ramon's victory, during 1995-1996, served as its treasurer. In 1999, Oron was appointed Minister of Agriculture in Ehud Barak's government. In 2000, he resigned from the Knesset to better carry out his duties as a Minister. He returned to the Knesset after the 2003 elections.

In 2007, Oron decided to challenge incumbent leader Yossi Beilin in the following year's leadership election. Beilin withdrew from the race that December, and Oron was elected his successor. He headed the party's list in the 2009 elections, but saw the party reduced to just three seats. Several days after the election, on 14 February, 300 Meretz members signed a petition urging Oron to resign, while a second petition signed by 400 other party members, including Shulamit Aloni and Yossi Beilin, called for him to stay. The next day, Oron said he decided not to resign, saying: "For me, responsibility means working toward the rehabilitation of Meretz".

In January 2011 Oron announced he would resign from the Knesset within a few months, before formally resigning his seat on 23 March. He remained the leader of Meretz until Zehava Galon was elected to replace him in February 2012.

=== Activism ===
Oron has embarked on several projects to improve the welfare of the Bedouin population of the Negev, among them the establishment of a wastewater purification plant, a health clinic and nursery schools. He is known for his ties with Marwan Barghouti, now serving five life terms in an Israeli jail for terrorist activities. Qadura Fares, a senior Fatah official, described Oron as a "loyal friend" and a "loyal Zionist," but also attentive to the problems of the Palestinians.

Oron was one of the initiators of the Geneva Accord, together with Yossi Beilin.

He is the Laureate of the 2005 "Quality in Government Award"
