= 2008 Meretz leadership election =

Election for leader of the Meretz Party

- 18 March 2008
- Turnout: 72.95%
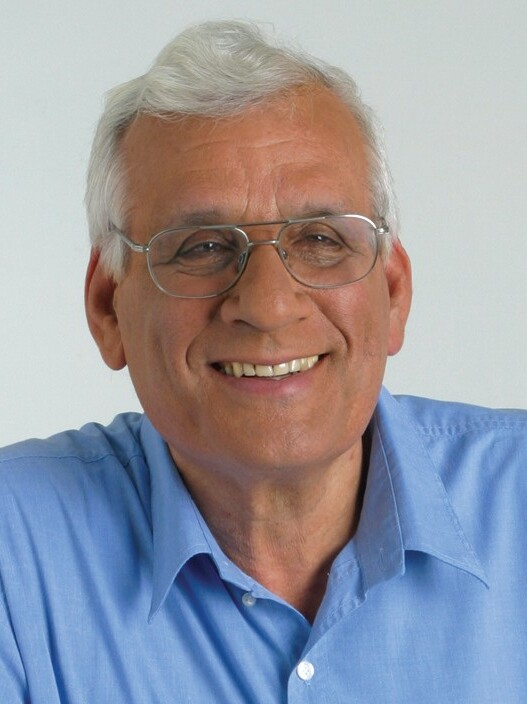

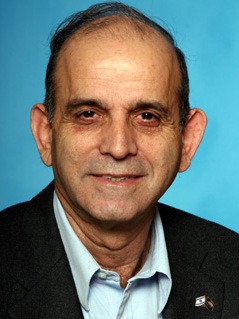

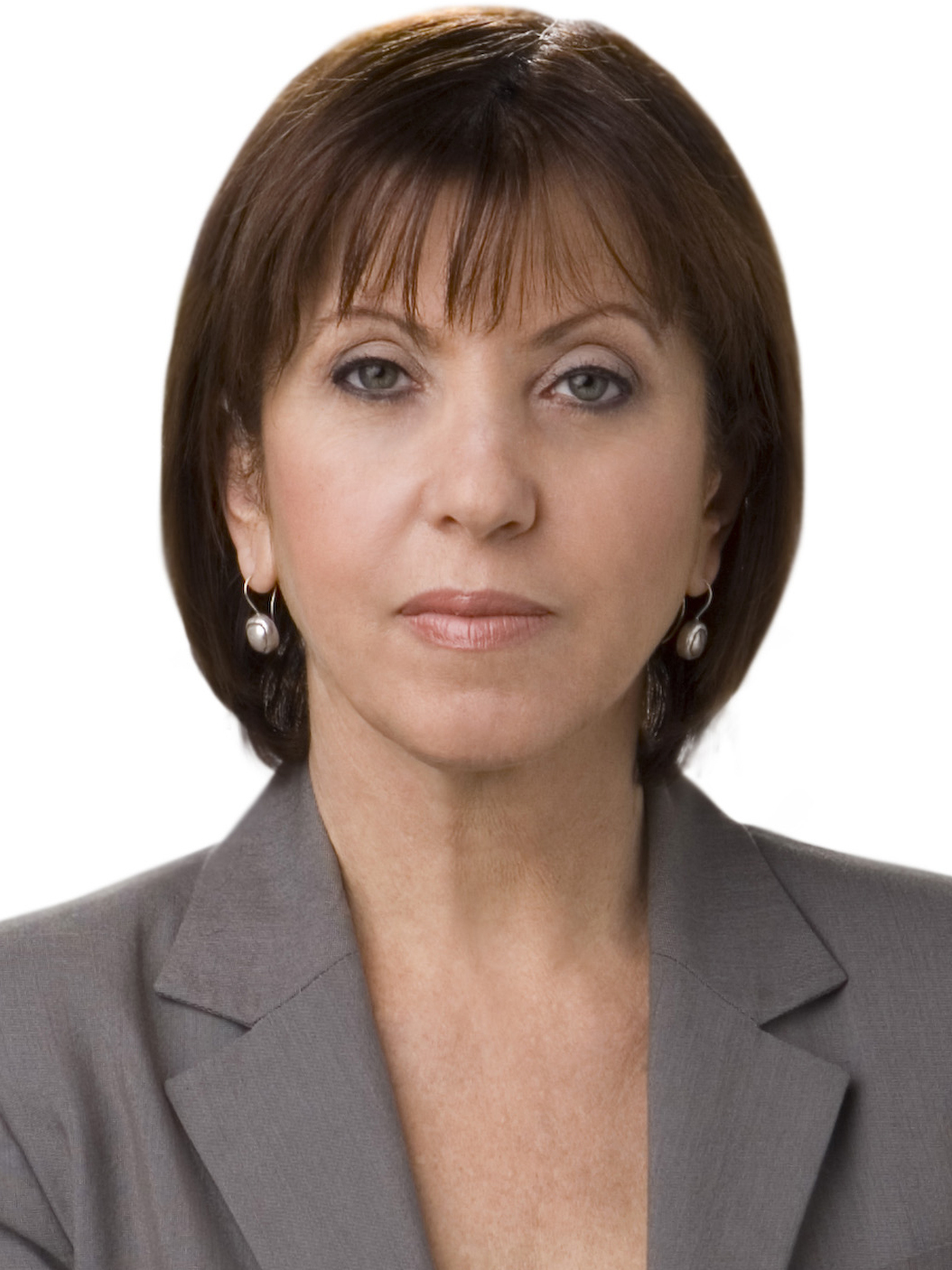
| Candidate | Haim Oron | Ran Cohen | Zehava Galon |
| Party | Meretz | Meretz | Meretz |
| Popular vote | 5,709 | 2,830 | 1,891 |
| Percentage | 54.5% | 27.1% | 18.1% |
Leader before election
Yossi Beilin
Elected Leader
Haim Oron

The 2008 Meretz leadership election was held on 18 March 2008.

== Candidates ==
=== Ran ===
- Ran Cohen, member of the Knesset since 1984 and former minister of industry and trade (1999–2000)
- Zehava Galon, member of the Knesset since 1999
- Haim Oron, member of the Knesset (1988–2000 and again since 2003) and former minister of agriculture (1999–2000)

=== Withdrew ===
- Yossi Beilin, incumbent party leader

== Campaign ==
After Oron declared that he would run for party leader, incumbent party leader Yossi Beilin withdrew from the election.

== Election system and conduct ==
The election was open to all members of the party. If no candidate had secured an outright majority of the vote in the initial round, a runoff election would have been held.

On the day of the election, Cohen filed a complaint with the party's election committee alleging irregularities at some polling stations. Galon demanded that three polling stations located in Deir al-Asad have their votes discounted, alleging that her campaign's representatives were blocked from overseeing the voting there and were physically assaulted.

== Results ==
Around 75% of party members participated in the election. Oron won the outright majority required to forgo a runoff election, winning the party's leadership outright in the initial round of voting.

2008 Meretz leadership election
| Party | Candidate | Votes | % |
|---|---|---|---|
| Meretz | Haim Oron | 5,709 | 54.5 |
| Meretz | Ran Cohen | 2,830 | 27.1 |
| Meretz | Zehava Galon | 1,891 | 18.1 |
| Total votes | | 10,476 | 100 |
| Turnout | | | 72.95 |
