= Anat Maor =

Israeli politician

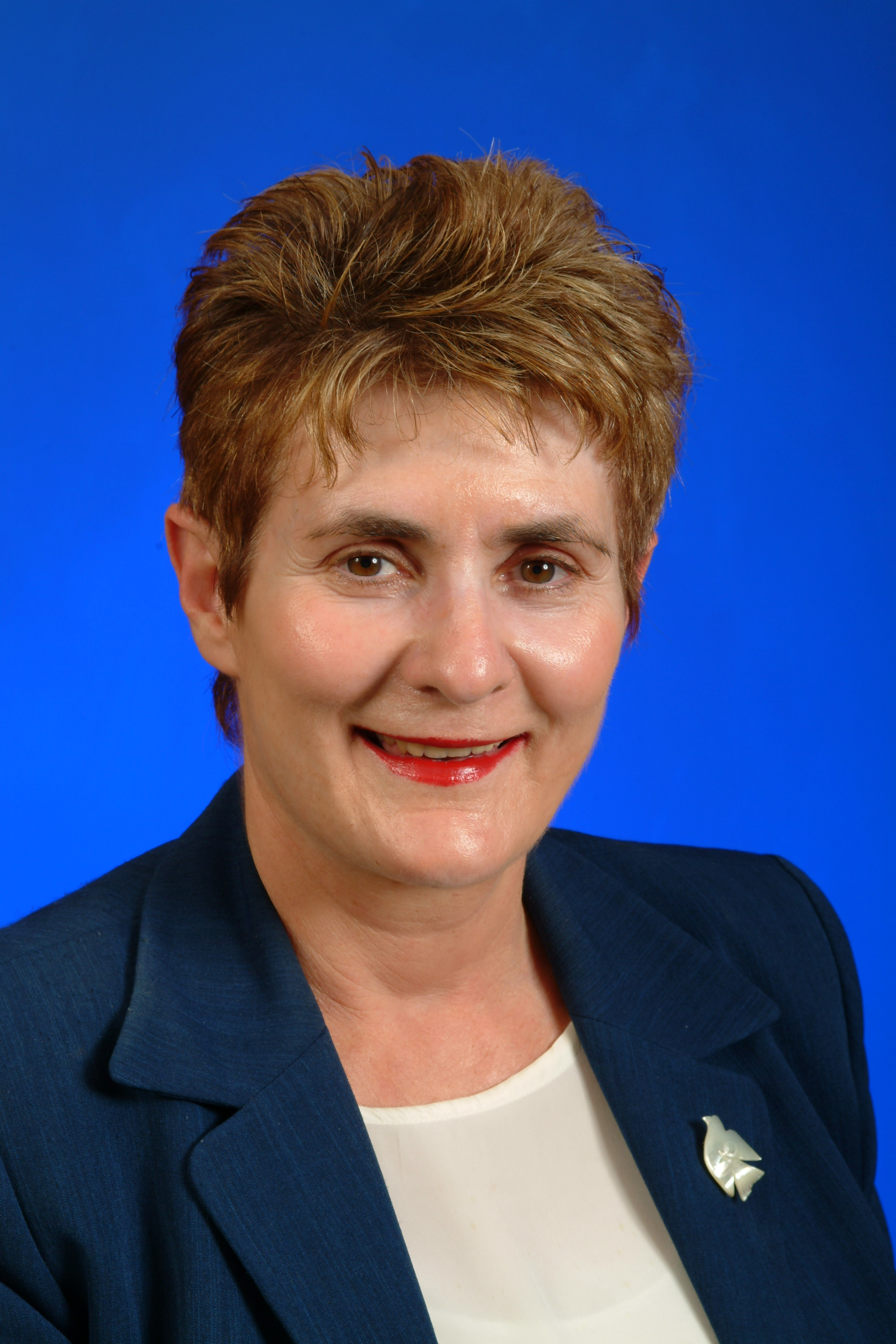
- Maor in 2010

Faction represented in the Knesset
- 1992–2003: Meretz

Personal details
- Born: 28 May 1945 (age 81) Negba, Mandatory Palestine

Anat Maor (Hebrew: ענת מאור; born 28 May 1945) is an Israeli former politician who served as a member of the Knesset for Meretz between 1992 and 2003.

== Biography ==
Born in kibbutz Negba during the Mandate era, Maor studied at Tel Aviv University gaining a BA in history and philosophy and an MA in labour management. She worked as a headmistress of a high school and a university lecturer, and also served as secretary of Negba and a director of the United States branch of the Kibbutz Zionist Immigration office.

She was first elected to the Knesset in 1992, and served as Deputy Speaker of the Knesset during her first term. After being re-elected in 1996, she chaired the subcommittee for the Advancement of Women in the Workplace and Economy. For the 1999 elections she was placed fifth on the Meretz list, and retained her seat for a second time. During her third term in the Knesset she chaired the Science and Technology Committee.

Maor lost her seat in the 2003 elections.
