= 1996 Meretz leadership election =

Election for leader of the Meretz Party

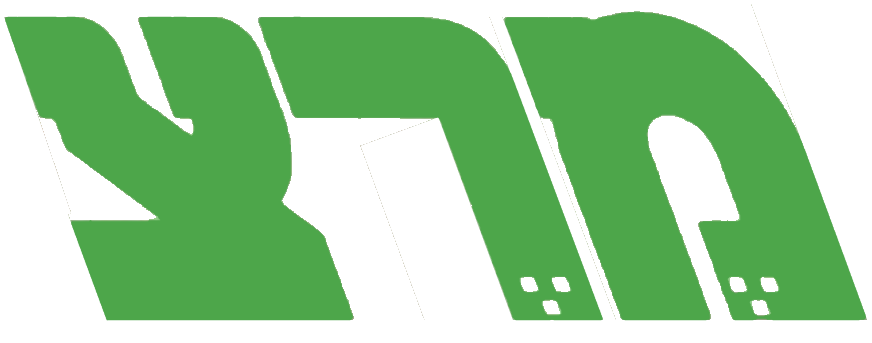
22 October 1996	1999 →
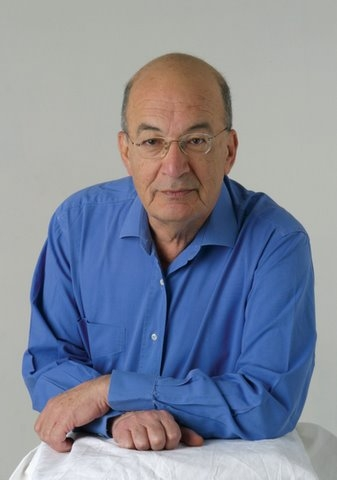
Candidate	Yossi Sarid
Meretz leader before election
Shulamit Aloni
Meretz leader
Yossi Sarid

The 1996 Meretz leadership election was held on 22 October 1996. It saw the election of Yossi Sarid to succeed Shulamit Aloni as the party's leader. This was the first leadership election in the party's history. The election was held by a vote of Meretz' Party Council. Incumbent party leader Aloni had announced her retirement after Sarid had announced his intent to challenge her for party leadership. This came amid disputes between the party's leadership.

== Background ==
Meretz was formed prior to the 1992 Israeli legislative election by an alliance of three left-wing political parties, Ratz, Mapam and Shinui, and was initially led by Ratz's chairwoman and long-time Knesset member Shulamit Aloni. The party proceeded to win twelve seats in the election, making it the third-largest in the Knesset. Meretz became the major coalition partner of Yitzhak Rabin's Labor Party, helping pave the way for the Oslo Accords. The party also picked up several ministerial portfolios; Aloni was made Minister of Education, then Minister of Communications and Science and Technology, while other party members including Amnon Rubinstein, Yossi Sarid and Yair Tzaban received additional portfolios.
