= Ilan Gilon =

Israeli politician (1956–2022)

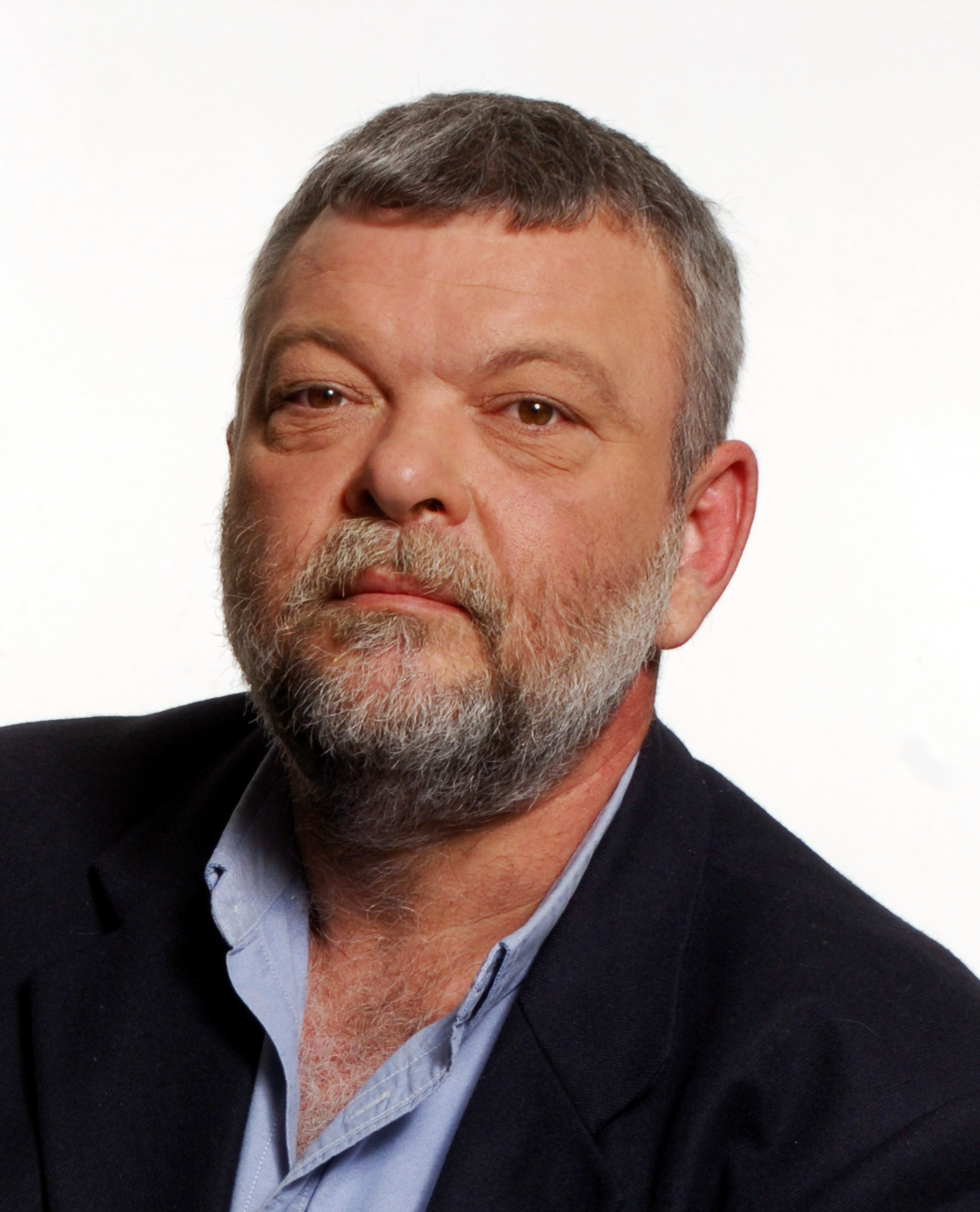
- Gilon in 2008

Faction represented in the Knesset
- 1999–2003: Meretz
- 2009–2019: Meretz
- 2019–2020: Democratic Union
- 2021: Meretz

Personal details
- Born: 12 May 1956 Galați, Romania
- Died: 1 May 2022 (aged 65) Israel

Ilan Gilon (Hebrew: אִילָן גִּילְאוֹן; 12 May 1956 – 1 May 2022) was an Israeli politician. He served as a member of the Knesset for the Meretz and the Democratic Union alliance in three spells between 1999 and 2021.

== Biography ==
Born in Galați, Romania, the son of Abraham Goldstein, Gilon had polio at the age of seven months, leaving him with a leg disability. He made aliyah to Israel with his family at age nine and grew up in Ashdod. At age 18, he was exempted from conscription into the Israel Defense Forces due to his disability, but he fought to be allowed to serve, and at age 24 was recruited for a short voluntary service in the IDF Education and Youth Corps. He studied international relations and political science at the Hebrew University of Jerusalem, but did not complete his studies. During his youth, he chaired the Mapam youth group and was placed sixth on the Mapam list for the 1988 Knesset elections, in which the party won only three seats. After Mapam merged into Meretz in the early 1990s, he became the first Meretz Youth coordinator in 1995. Between 1993 and 1999 he served as deputy mayor of Ashdod, in which he was responsible for education.

Prior to the 1999 Knesset elections Gilon was placed eighth on the Meretz list, and entered then Knesset when the party won ten seats. Gilon devoted most of his activity in the Knesset to social affairs, as part of his ideology, which he calls "Orthopedic Socialism". He was a member of the committees on the Economy, Interior and Environmental Affairs, Child's Rights, Labor, Welfare and Health and the special committee to the problem of Foreign Workers. During his first term in the Knesset, Gilon passed over 15 laws and amendments, including an amendment to the social insurance law that improved disabled rights, a law that required paying waiters the minimum wage, regardless of tips, and an expansion of the Handicapped rights law, adding a chapter that involved making structures accessible to disabled people. Gilon was the only Meretz MK to vote against Ehud Barak's budget, stating it is "Anti-Social in a most profound way". As a response to Ehud Barak's call after the publication of the Poverty Report, to "Open the refrigerators", Gilon said "For those sorts statements you need a refrigerators technician, not a Prime Minister".

For the 2003 elections he was placed seventh on the Meretz list, but lost his seat when the party was reduced to six MKs. After leaving the Knesset he owned a restaurant called "Beit HaAm" in which the waiters wore shirts of Israeli youth movements. He was placed eighth on the party's list for the 2006 elections, but missed out on a seat as the party was reduced to five MKs. Prior to the 2009 elections Gilon won second place on the Meretz list, and returned to the Knesset when the party won three seats. He served as head of the Meretz faction in the Knesset, and was ranked as one of the five top legislators of social laws according to the Social Guard index.

In February 2012 Gilon ran for the Meretz leadership, finishing second with 37.7%, behind Zehava Gal-On (60%) and ahead of Ori Ophir (2.8%). He was re-elected in 2013, and again in 2015 after being placed second on the party's list. In 2018 he won the Henry Viscardi Achievement Award for leaders in disability sector. In February 2019, Gilon won the most votes in Meretz's first-ever list primaries. He retained second place on the Meretz list for the April 2019 elections, in which the party won four seats. Meretz contested the September 2019 elections as part of the Democratic Union alliance, with Gilon retaining his seat as the fifth-placed candidate on the alliance's list.

For the 2020 elections, Meretz ran on a joint list with Labor and Gesher. Gilon was placed eighth on the list, but lost his seat as the parties won only seven seats. He replaced Amir Peretz on 29 January 2021 as a member of the twenty-third Knesset after Peretz's Knesset resignation came into effect. He did not run for re-election in the March 2021 elections due to issues with his health.

Gilon died on 1 May 2022.

Gilon was married to Yehudit and was a father of four. He also had grandchildren, and lived in Ashdod.
