= Meretz =

Israeli political party

Meretz מרצ
- Founders: Shulamit Aloni; Yair Tzaban; Amnon Rubinstein
- Founded: 1992 (alliance); 1997 (single party)
- Dissolved: 12 July 2024
- Merger of: Ratz; Mapam; Shinui
- Merged into: The Democrats
- Headquarters: Tel Aviv
- Youth wing: Meretz Youth
- Ideology: Social democracy Secularism; Progressivism
- Political position: Left-wing
- National affiliation: Democratic Union (2019–2020); Labor-Gesher-Meretz (2020)
- European affiliation: Party of European Socialists (observer)
- International affiliation: Progressive Alliance; Socialist International
- Colours: Green
- Slogan: חייבים ממשלה עם מרצ (We need a government with Meretz) מרצ בשמאל, האדם במרכז (Meretz is in the left, the human in the center) (Note: Meretz used different slogans in different elections, but these two were reused across multiple elections.)
- Most MKs: 12 (1992–1996)
- Fewest MKs: 0 (2022–2024)

Election symbol
- מרצ م‌ر‌ص

Party flag

Website
- meretz.org.il

Meretz (Hebrew: מֶרֶצ, lit. 'Vigour'; Arabic: ميرتس) was a political party in Israel. It originated as an alliance of the Ratz, Mapam, and Shinui parties in 1992 and became a unified party in 1997.

Meretz identified as a social democratic and secular party. Its platform emphasized support for a two-state solution to the Israeli–Palestinian conflict, human rights (including those of religious, ethnic, and sexual minorities), religious freedom, and environmentalism. Although Meretz was established by three Zionist parties, and it initially expressed itself as another such party, the party’s own position on Zionism in its later years has been disputed.

Meretz was a member of the Progressive Alliance and Socialist International, and was an observer member of the Party of European Socialists. The party achieved its highest electoral result in the 1992 Israeli legislative election, winning 12 seats in the Knesset. During most of the early 21st century, it held between three and six seats.

In the 2022 Israeli legislative election, it failed to pass the electoral threshold and did not gain representation in the Knesset, the only time this occurred in its history. In 2024, Meretz merged with the Israeli Labor Party to establish a new political party, The Democrats.

== History ==
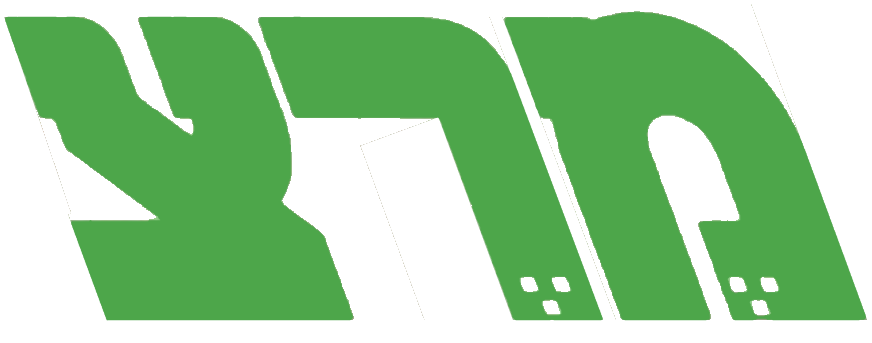
Original logo of Meretz upon its formation in 1992, when Ratz, Shinui and Mapam formed the joint list

=== Background ===
The Second Alignment, an alliance headed by Israel's dominant Labor Party, held practical hegemony over the left-wing of Israeli politics. Smaller, more left-leaning parties were either targeted towards Palestinian Arab citizens of Israel, such as Hadash, or, in the case of Zionist or post-Zionist parties, very small, such as Ratz or the ill-fated Left Camp of Israel, leading to neither group being viable for government formation.

Multiple political realignments starting with the 1977 'upheaval' (the electoral victory of the Likud over the Alignment) led to the rise of alternatives to Labor. The Left Camp dissolved over the issue on how to negotiate with the Palestine Liberation Organization, with the PLO-sceptic faction, including Ran Cohen and Binyamin Temkin, joining Shulamit Aloni's Ratz, a liberal socialist party committed to improving civil liberties for all Israeli citizens, and negotiating a peace deal. The Shinui party had formed a large liberal alliance known as the Democratic Movement for Change, but this collapsed in 1978, with Shinui seeking out an image as a party that sided with the left-wing on issues of peace and secularism, despite being economically right-wing, though it lost a legislator, Mordechai Virshubski, to Ratz. When Labor entered a national unity government with the Likud in 1984, it angered the largest partner in the Alignment, the democratic socialist Mapam, who left the Alignment and resumed its existence as an independent political party.

As early as 1985, Mapam and Ratz, who agreed on many economic, social and geopolitical issues, considered an alliance. The outbreak of the First Intifada had forced politicians from across the spectrum to rethink their stances on Palestinian statehood. For example, Mapam, who had previously supported giving the West Bank to Jordan, began to support an independent Palestinian state. Furthermore, members of both parties, as well as of Labor, collaborated within the Peace Now organisation.

=== Beginnings ===
Leading up to the 1988 Israeli legislative election, all attempts to form a joint list between the pacifist left parties failed, as Ratz, Mapam and Shinui all contested the election separately. When Ratz signed a surplus vote agreement with the Alignment, Mapam accused Ratz of wanting to "remove Mapam from the political scene", to which Ratz leader Shulamit Aloni responded by saying that "Mapam's panic is understandable. It is a spoiled party, rich in assets and jobs, which fears any young, fresh organization without vested economic interests that comes to fight with clean hands." She also highlighted the inevitability of the two parties becoming allies, comparing Mapam to the biblical character Saul throwing his spear at David. Furthermore, Mapam's leader, Yair Tzaban, was a long-time rival of Ran Cohen, ever since the two were members of the Left Camp, something which made a union seem even more unlikely.

Mapam formed a surplus vote agreement with Shinui. Ratz's role in the election was its most important ever. Some opinion polls put Ratz at eight seats, a clear case to become Labor's main coalition partner. Ratz won five seats, while Mapam, once Israel's second-largest party, sank to just three seats. Shinui went from three to two seats. None of the parties joined the next government, a continuation of the national unity government.

During the 1989 local elections, the three left-Zionist parties made joint lists in many towns and cities. In 1990, all ten of their MKs agreed to co-ordinate policy on most issues, to pave the way for a joint list in the 1992 elections. In fact, a provisional list order was agreed where the three party leaders would be on top, followed by Ratz's Yossi Sarid. The three parties would also appear together at demonstrations. At the same time, questions were raised over the feasibility of the strengthening alliance between the three. While all three had virtually no differences on the issue of peace, Mapam was an anti-capitalist party based in the kibbutzim, and its affiliated Kibbutz Artzi movement was against forming an alliance with Ratz and especially Shinui, two parties who drew support from the upper and middle class in suburban areas and cities. The second-in-command of Shinui, Avraham Poraz, was a self-described 'capitalist'.

In July 1991, Ran Cohen attempted to recruit Ezer Weizman, leader of the centrist, but pacifist and Arab-inclusive, party Yahad, into the fold. However, leaked contents of their discussion, and Shulamit Aloni's perception that her leadership of the alliance was being threatened, caused the talks to break down, with Weizman calling the left-wing union a 'farce'. Nevertheless, the left-wing union remained the only viable option for Ratz, Mapam and Shinui. Polls in 1991 predicted that a unified list between the three could win up to eighteen seats, while remaining separate would keep them at ten. Furthermore, in October 1991, the electoral threshold was raised to 1.5%, a number which endangered Mapam and Shinui's chances of making it into the next Knesset alone.

=== As an alliance (1992–1997) ===
On 1 March 1992, Ratz, Mapam and Shinui agreed to create a joint Knesset faction and electoral alliance. It was initially called 'Democratic Israel', chosen among other proposed names including 'The Democratic Union' (coincidentally used by Meretz in 2019), 'Different Israel' and 'The Triangle'. Its election symbol, (מרצ), combined Mapam (מפ"ם) and Ratz (רצ). Under the agreement, Shulamit Aloni would lead the list, and another four of the top ten would be reserved for Ratz members. Within the top 16, there would be at least three women and two Arab candidates. By the time of the election campaign, the party's name was changed to 'Meretz', with 'Democratic Israel' appearing in the party's ballot subtitle. Although Shinui was not included in the acronym, it was referenced in the party’s campaign slogan: ממשלה עם מרצ, הכוח לעשות את השינוי (A government with vigor [Meretz], the strength to make the change [Shinui]).

Mapam had been established before Israel's independence and therefore had a strong legacy network of kibbutzim and the Hashomer Hatzair organisation to support Meretz, while Ratz and Shinui contributed their wealthier, more urban voters to the new alliance.

In the 1992 Israeli legislative election, Meretz won twelve seats, an increase from the combined ten seats that the three constituent parties had won in 1988. This result made Meretz the third-largest party in the Knesset. It became the major coalition partner of Prime Minister Yitzhak Rabin’s Labor Party and played a role in advancing the Oslo Accords. Members of Meretz held several ministerial positions: Shulamit Aloni was appointed Minister of Education, but after disagreements over the role of religion in education, she was reassigned in May 1993 as Minister Without Portfolio. In June 1993, she became Minister of Communications and Minister of Science and Technology, later renamed Minister of Science and the Arts. Amnon Rubinstein, Shinui leader and co-founder, served as Minister of Energy and Infrastructure, Minister of Science and Technology, and later Minister of Education, Culture, and Sport. Yossi Sarid of Ratz was appointed Minister of the Environment, and Mapam leader Yair Tzaban became Minister of Immigrant Absorption.

Before the 1996 Israeli general election, Aloni was defeated by Sarid in an internal leadership contest and subsequently retired from political life.

For the election campaign, Meretz used the song Shir LaShalom ("A Song for Peace"), which had been sung at a rally minutes before Yitzhak Rabin was shot and killed by a far-right extremist. The party adapted a line of the song for its slogan, "תנו למרצ לעלות!" ("Let Meretz Rise!"). Meretz stressed it was the only coalition partner that would keep Labor on a positive path. While Meretz supported Shimon Peres's bid to become the first directly elected prime minister, they warned that a second ballot for the Labor Party would lead to a Labor-Shas coalition, which would be vulnerable to the right wing.

In the election, Meretz lost three seats, and a right-wing government was formed when Benjamin Netanyahu was directly elected as prime minister.

=== Merger and decline (1997–2003) ===
In 1997, the three founding parties formally merged to form a single political entity. While Rubinstein supported the merger, most Shinui members opposed it. A faction of Shinui, led by Rubinstein, joined the new party, while the remainder, under Avraham Poraz, re-established Shinui as an independent party. In 1999, after finding out that he would not be put on a high list spot for the next election, David Zucker left Meretz to serve as an independent member. He would join The Greens.

In the same year, Yossi Sarid was reelected as leader of Meretz in an internal leadership election conducted through a vote of party convention delegates.

The election preceded the 1999 Israeli general election. During the campaign, Meretz used the slogan, "מרצ - להיות חופשי בארצנו" ("Meretz - to be free in our country" - a reference to Hatikvah), to highlight their support of separating religion and government. Meretz increased their political hostility towards Shas (who had just served as junior coalition partner to the Likud), and made it a core campaign point to overtake them to become the third party. They also criticised other parties in the centre-left bloc for being 'single issue' and siphoning votes from them. One of those parties, Shinui, led by Tommy Lapid, was becoming the most vocal anti-clerical party.

In the election, the party increased its representation to ten seats. Among those elected was Hussniya Jabara, who became the first female Palestinian citizen of Israel to serve as a member of the Knesset. However, Meretz did not achieve their goal of beating Shas. Nevertheless, Meretz joined Prime Minister Ehud Barak’s coalition government. Sarid was appointed Minister of Education, Ran Cohen became Minister of Industry and Trade, and Haim Oron was appointed Minister of Agriculture and Rural Development.

After Likud leader Ariel Sharon defeated Barak in the 2001 Israeli prime ministerial election, Meretz found itself out of a coalition again. On 22 October 2002, Amnon Rubinstein retired from the Knesset, and Uzi Even, next on the Meretz list, entered parliament, becoming the first openly gay member of the Knesset. His appointment drew mixed reactions, particularly from Haredi parties.

For the 2003 Israeli legislative election, Meretz ran a joint list with Roman Bronfman’s Democratic Choice and Yossi Beilin's Shahar Movement. The party’s representation declined to six seats. Sarid assumed responsibility for the result and resigned as party leader, though he continued to serve as a Knesset member until his retirement before the 2006 Israeli legislative election.

=== Yachad (2003–2006) ===
In December 2003, Meretz merged with the Shahar Movement. The intended name for the new party, Ya’ad (יעד, “Goal”, Ratz's former name), was abandoned due to concerns that it resembled the Russian word for "poison" and might alienate Russian-speaking voters. The name Yachad (יח"ד, meaning "Together") was chosen instead. It also served as a Hebrew acronym for "Social Democratic Israel" (ישראל חברתית דמוקרטית, Yisrael Hevratit Demokratit). The merger aimed to unify the dovish Zionist camp, which had experienced a significant decline in electoral strength amidst the Second Intifada. Although the merger included Meretz, Shahar, and Democratic Choice, other targeted movements declined to join. Party membership fell to approximately 20,000, about half the size of its 1999 membership.

In March 2004, Yossi Beilin was elected the first chairman of Yachad, defeating Ran Cohen. In July 2005, the party adopted the name Meretz-Yachad, following opinion polls showing that the public was more familiar with the name Meretz. Beilin opposed dropping Yachad entirely, and a compromise name was adopted.

=== 2006–2022 ===
In the 2006 elections, the party reverted to using the name Meretz with the slogan "Meretz on the left, the Human in the center,” and its representation fell to five seats.

In 2007, Tzvia Greenfield, sixth on the party list, entered the Knesset following Beilin’s retirement, becoming the first female Haredi member of the Knesset. In March 2008, an internal leadership election was held. Candidates included Yossi Beilin, Zehava Galon, Ran Cohen, and Haim Oron. Beilin later withdrew and endorsed Oron, who won the election on 18 March 2008 with 54.5% of the vote, defeating Cohen (27.1%) and Galon (18.1%).

On 22 December 2008, Meretz completed a merger with Hatnua HaHadasha (“The New Movement”) in preparation for the 2009 Israeli legislative election.

The joint Meretz–Hatnua HaHadasha list won three seats in the election. The decline in support was largely attributed to progressive Zionist voters casting strategic ballots for the Kadima party, aiming to help Tzipi Livni form a government instead of Likud leader Benjamin Netanyahu. Following the election, some party members called for the resignation of party chairman Haim Oron and advocated for Zehava Galon to assume leadership. Oron resigned from the Knesset on 23 March 2011 and subsequently stepped down as party leader.

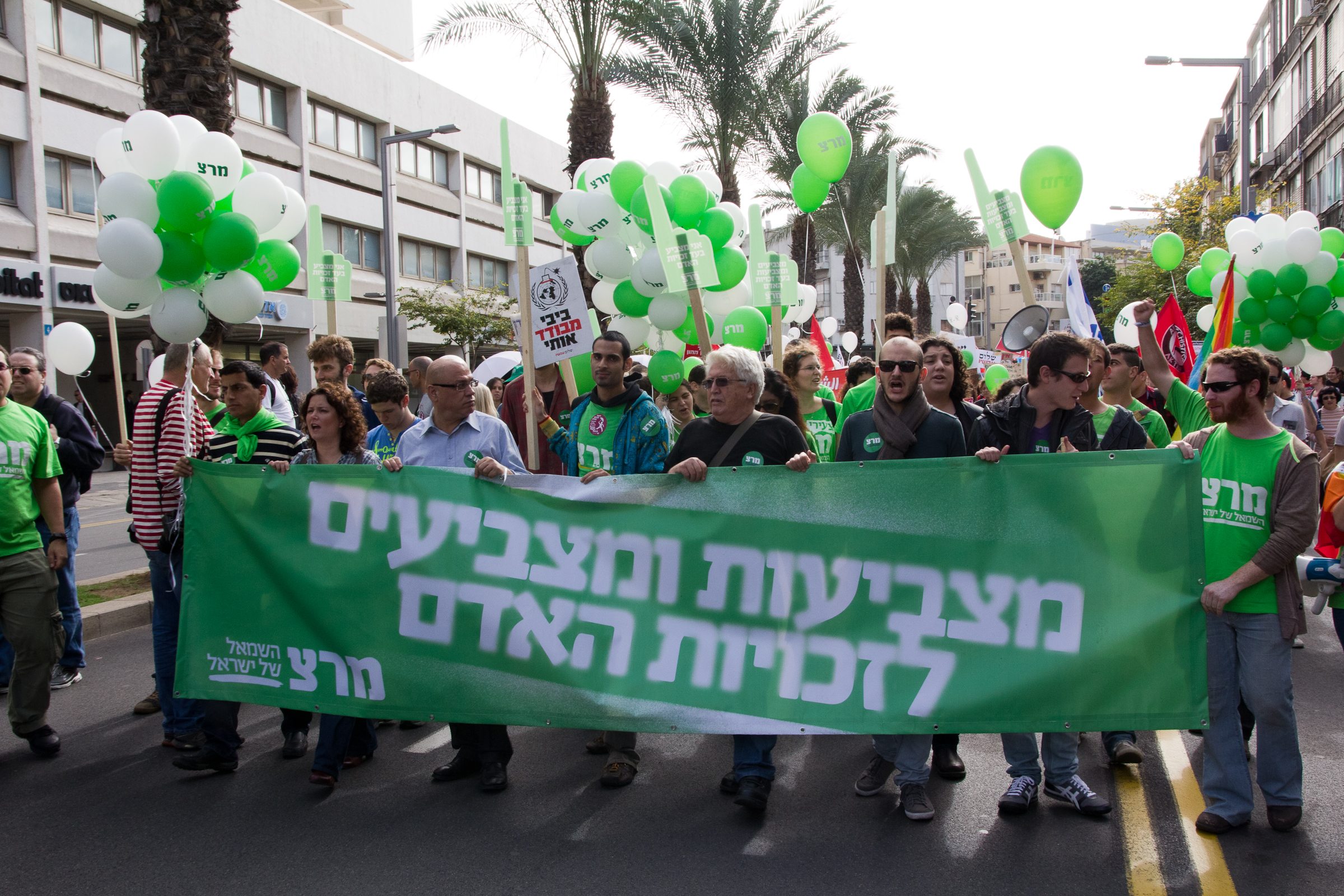
Meretz marchers at the International Human Rights March, Tel Aviv, 7 December 2012

A leadership contest was held, with Zehava Galon, Ilan Gilon, and youth activist Ori Ophir competing for the position. In the primaries on 7 February 2012, Galon was elected party chair with 60.6% of the vote, followed by Gilon with 36.6% and Ophir with 2.8%. In the 2013 Israeli legislative election, Meretz received 4.5% of the national vote and won six Knesset seats.

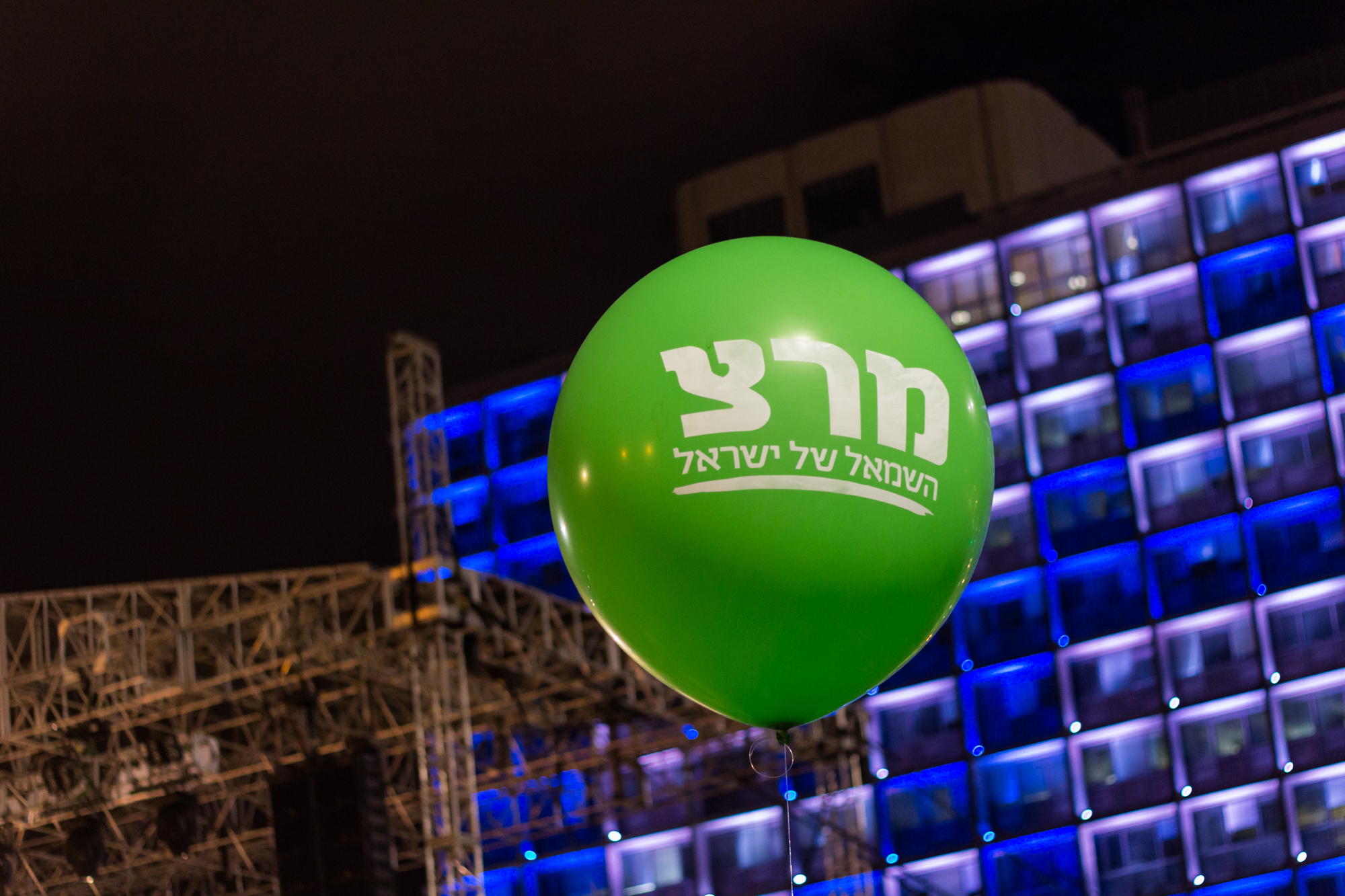
Meretz balloon flying at the Rabin memorial rally in Rabin Square, 1 November 2014

On 8 December 2014, Meretz signed a surplus-vote agreement with the Labor Party for the upcoming 2015 legislative election, the latter set to contest the election as the Zionist Union. On 19 January 2015, Meretz held its primaries at a meeting of its 1,000-member central committee in the Tel Aviv Convention Center: Zehava Galon was re-elected party leader, whilst MK Nitzan Horowitz chose not to stand for re-election.

Ahead of the 2015 Israeli legislative election, Meretz signed a surplus-vote agreement with the Labor Party, which ran as part of the Zionist Union. After early election results suggested that Meretz’s representation would drop to four seats, Galon announced her intention to resign as chairperson and from the Knesset to make room for Tamar Zandberg, the fifth-place candidate. However, once absentee and soldier ballots were counted, Meretz gained a fifth seat, and Galon rescinded her resignation.

Zandberg was elected party leader in 2018. In February 2019, Meretz held its first open primary, with 86% of party members participating. Ilan Gilon placed first and was ranked second on the Knesset slate after Zandberg. Michal Rozin placed second, followed by Issawi Frej and Ali Salalha. In the April 2019 Israeli legislative election, Meretz won four seats.

Logo of Meretz 2012–2022

Ahead of the September 2019 Israeli legislative election, Meretz formed an electoral alliance called the Democratic Union with Ehud Barak’s Israel Democratic Party and breakaway Labor MK Stav Shaffir. The alliance, approved on 29 July 2019, won five seats, three of which were held by Meretz members. Before the 2020 Israeli legislative election, Meretz entered a new alliance with Labor and Gesher, which won seven seats, including three for Meretz.

==== Return to government (2021–2022) ====
In the 2021 Israeli legislative election, Meretz won six seats and joined a coalition government with Yesh Atid, Blue and White, Yamina, the Labor Party, Yisrael Beiteinu, New Hope and the United Arab List. Three Meretz members held ministerial posts: Nitzan Horowitz as Minister of Health, Tamar Zandberg as Minister of Environmental Protection, and Issawi Frej as Minister of Regional Cooperation. This marked the party’s first participation in a governing coalition since 2000.

=== Final decline and merger (2022–2024) ===
In the 2022 Israeli legislative election, under the renewed leadership of Zehava Galon, Meretz failed to pass the electoral threshold by approximately 3,800 votes, resulting in the loss of all Knesset representation for the first time. Following the election, Meretz’s local branches and candidates reported financial difficulties due to the party’s lack of parliamentary funding.

On 30 June 2024, Meretz agreed to merge with the Israeli Labor Party to establish a new political party, The Democrats. Under the terms of the merger, Meretz was guaranteed one position for every four on the new party’s electoral list and proportional representation within party bodies. The merger also ensured continued representation for Meretz’s municipal factions. The agreement was ratified at a joint convention of delegates from both parties on 12 July 2024. Following the merger, Meretz and Labor remained separate organizationally and financially, with their respective factions in the Histadrut, municipal councils, and other external bodies continuing to operate independently while coordinating activities.

== Ideology ==
Meretz was a Zionist and social democratic party that advocated for progressive, egalitarian, and secular policies, as well as for green politics. The party supported a two-state solution based on the framework of the 2003 Geneva Initiative to the Israeli–Palestinian conflict and maintained a platform emphasizing civil liberties, social justice, and environmental sustainability.

In international media, the party was often characterized as left-wing, dovish, secular, civil libertarian, and opposed to the Israeli occupation of Palestinian territories. Meretz was affiliated with several international organizations, including full membership in the Socialist International and the Progressive Alliance, and participated in Global Greens conferences.

The party opposed the Basic Law: Israel as the Nation-State of the Jewish People in 2018, organizing protests and petitioning the Supreme Court of Israel to overturn the legislation on the grounds that it discriminated against Arab citizens and the Druze community.

Domestically, Meretz advocated for the rights of minorities in Israel, including Palestinian citizens and foreign workers; ensuring The State of Israel’s national security; supported affirmative action; and promoted LGBT rights. Its platform called for strengthening Israel’s social welfare system, protecting workers from exploitation—particularly among migrant and immigrant laborers—upholding the separation of religion and state, guaranteeing freedom of religion for non-Jewish communities, promoting liberal and pluralistic education.

At its birth, Meretz stressed that it supported 'reformed Zionism'; the continued existence of Israel as a Jewish and democratic state.

Meretz had a 'red' faction of socialists, centred around the former Mapam and Ilan Gilon, that called for closer cooperation with the Labor Party under Amir Peretz.

== Leaders ==
Leader		Took office	Left office	Knesset elections	Elected/re-elected as leader
1	Shulamit Aloni	1992	1996	1992	
2	Yossi Sarid	1996	2003	1996, 1999, 2003	1996, 1999
3	Yossi Beilin	2004	2008	2006	2004
4	Haim Oron	2008	2012	2009	2008
5	Zehava Galon	2012	2018	2013, 2015	2012, 2015
6	Tamar Zandberg	2018	2019	2019 (Apr)	2018
7	Nitzan Horowitz	2019	2022	2019 (Sep), 2020, 2021	2019
(5)	Zehava Galon	2022	2022	2022	2022

=== Leadership election process ===
Shulamit Aloni became the party's leader in 1992 not by a formal leadership election, but instead by a consensus of the party's founding leaders. After her 1996 retirement as leader, the party held its 1996 leadership election, for which the electorate was the membership of its Party Council. The party's 1999 leadership election saw a broader electorate, with the delegates of the Party Convention voting for its leader. In the 2004 leadership election, the party again expanded its leadership election electorate, opening the leadership vote up to the party's general membership. More than 15,000 party members participated in this leadership election. The 2012 leadership election saw a return to limiting the elecotrate to party convention delegates. In the 2018 leadership election, voting was re-opened to the party's general membership, before being closed for the 2019 leadership election, and later re-opened in 2022.

== Election results ==
Election	Leader	Votes	%	Seats	+/–	Status
1992	Shulamit Aloni	250,667	9.58 (#3)	12 / 120	▲2	Coalition
1996	Yossi Sarid	226,275	7.41 (#5)	9 / 120	▼3	Opposition
1999	Yossi Sarid	253,525	7.66 (#4)	10 / 120	▲1	Coalition (1999–2000)
1999	Yossi Sarid	253,525	7.66 (#4)	10 / 120	▲1	Opposition (2000–2003)
2003 (Note: With Democratic Choice and the Shahar Movement)	Yossi Sarid	164,122	5.21 (#6)	6 / 120	▼4	Opposition
2006 (Note: As Meretz-Yachad)	Yossi Beilin	118,302	3.77 (#9)	5 / 120	▼1	Opposition
2009	Haim Oron	99,611	2.95 (#10)	3 / 120	▼2	Opposition
2013	Zehava Galon	172,403	4.55 (#8)	6 / 120	▲3	Opposition
2015	Zehava Galon	165,529	3.93 (#10)	5 / 120	▼1	Opposition
Apr 2019	Tamar Zandberg	156,473	3.63 (#9)	4 / 120	▼1	Snap election
Sep 2019	Nitzan Horowitz	Part of the Democratic Union		3 / 120	▼1	Snap election
2020	Nitzan Horowitz	With Labor and Gesher (Note: Labor-Gesher-Meretz)		3 / 120	Steady	Opposition
2021	Nitzan Horowitz	202,218	4.59 (#12)	6 / 120	▲3	Coalition
2022	Zehava Galon	150,793	3.16 (#11)	0 / 120	▼6	Extra-parliamentary

== Knesset members ==
Knesset term	Seats	Members
1988–1992	10	Shulamit Aloni, Mordechai Virshubski, Ran Cohen, David Zucker, Yossi Sarid (Ratz), Haim Oron, Hussein Faris, Yair Tzaban (Mapam), Avraham Poraz, Amnon Rubinstein (Shinui)
1992–1996	12	Shulamit Aloni, Ran Cohen, David Zucker, Yossi Sarid, Naomi Chazan, Binyamin Temkin, Haim Oron, Walid Haj Yahia, Yair Tzaban, Anat Maor, Avraham Poraz, Amnon Rubinstein
1996–1999	9	Naomi Chazan, Ran Cohen, David Zucker (left 17 March 1999), Yossi Sarid, Haim Oron, Walid Haj Yahia, Anat Maor, Avraham Poraz (left 17 January 1999), Amnon Rubinstein
1999–2003	10	Haim Oron (replaced by Mossi Raz on 25 February 2000), Hussniya Jabara, Zehava Galon, Naomi Chazan, Ran Cohen, Anat Maor, Amnon Rubinstein (replaced by Uzi Even on 31 October 2002), Yossi Sarid, Avshalom Vilan, Ilan Gilon
2003–2006	5	Haim Oron, Zehava Galon, Avshalom Vilan, Ran Cohen, Yossi Sarid
2006–2009	5	Yossi Beilin (replaced by Tzvia Greenfield on 4 November 2009), Haim Oron, Ran Cohen, Zehava Galon, Avshalom Vilan
2009–2013	3	Haim Oron (replaced by Zehava Galon on 24 March 2011), Ilan Gilon, Nitzan Horowitz,
2013–2015	6	Zehava Galon, Ilan Gilon, Nitzan Horowitz, Michal Rozin, Issawi Frej, Tamar Zandberg
2015–2019	5	Zehava Galon (replaced by Mossi Raz on 22 October 2017), Ilan Gilon, Issawi Frej, Michal Rozin, Tamar Zandberg
2019	4	Tamar Zandberg, Ilan Gilon, Michal Rozin, Issawi Frej
2019–2020	3	Nitzan Horowitz, Tamar Zandberg, Ilan Gilon
2020–2021	4	Nitzan Horowitz, Tamar Zandberg, Yair Golan, Ilan Gilon
2021–2022	6	Nitzan Horowitz, Tamar Zandberg, Yair Golan, Ghaida Rinawie Zoabi, Issawi Frej (replaced by Ali Salalha on 18 July 2021), Mossi Raz
2022–2024	0	none

== Meretz supporters abroad ==
Several left-wing Zionist organizations that shared many of the ideas of Meretz are affiliated with the Israel-based World Union of Meretz, which is an umbrella group for organizations in Jewish communities around the world that were linked to the Meretz party. The WUM is a faction within the World Zionist Organization and is part of the World Zionist Union (which runs in World Zionist Congress elections under the name Hatikvah) made up of the Labor Zionist Movement/Ameinu, Arzenu, and the World Union of Meretz, and sends delegates to the World Zionist Congress. WUM affiliates include the London-based Meretz UK, France's Cercle Bernard Lazare and the USA's Partners for Progressive Israel. The World Union of Meretz has representation in other organizations, including the Jewish National Fund and the Zionist General Council.

Hashomer Hatzair, a progressive Zionist youth movement with branches in many countries, was informally associated with Meretz; it had previously been affiliated with Mapam.

American Jewish comedian Sarah Silverman, whose sister Susan moved from the US to Israel and is a Reform rabbi there, asked Israeli voters to choose Meretz in the 2015 election.

In October 2024 the US affiliate of the World Union of Meretz, Partners for Progressive Israel, was the first Zionist group in the United States to call on the United States government to suspend its sale of offensive arms to Israel, calling on the American government to redirect its aid to Israel to peacebuilding efforts.

== See also ==
- Peace Now
- Young Meretz
- Meretz Youth
- Partners for Progressive Israel
