= Zehava Galon =

Israeli politician (born 1956)

- זהבה גלאון
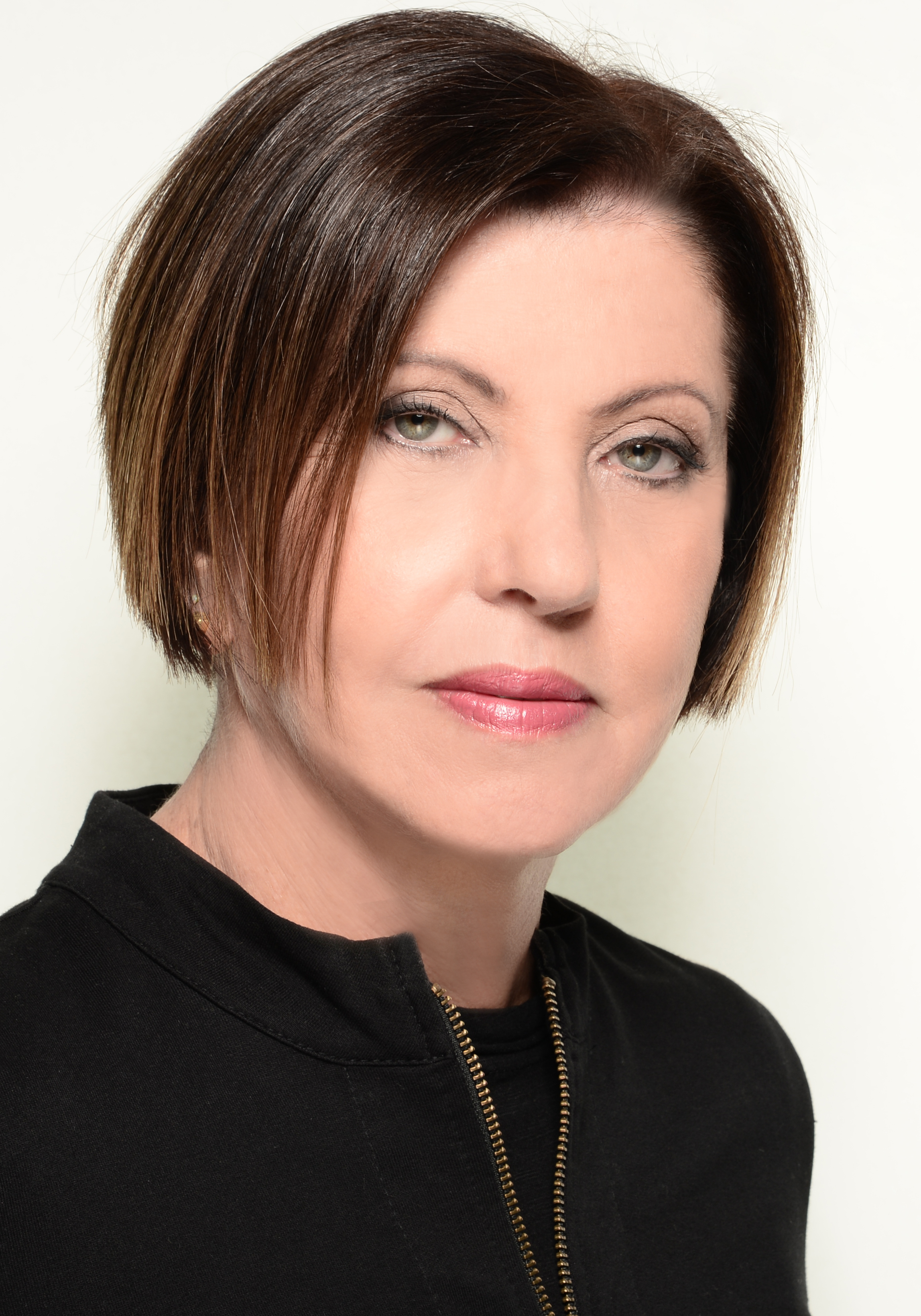
- Zehava Galon in 2020

Faction represented in the Knesset
- 1999–2009: Meretz
- 2011–2017: Meretz

Personal details
- Born: Zlata Shnipitskaya; 4 January 1956 (age 70) Vilnius, Lithuanian SSR, Soviet Union
- Party: Ratz (1984-1997); Meretz (1992-2024)
- Spouse: Pesach
- Children: 2
- Education: Beit Berl College

Zehava Galon (Hebrew: זהבה גלאון; born 4 January 1956), is an Israeli politician, the president of the research institute ZULAT for Equality and Human Rights and former leader of Meretz.

Galon served as a member of the Knesset from 1999 to 2017 and ran as the leader of Meretz in the 2022 Israeli legislative election but failed to pass the electoral threshold.

== Biography ==
Zehava Galon was born in 1956 in Vilnius in the Soviet Union (now in Lithuania). She immigrated at age four to Israel in 1960 with her parents: father Aryeh (born 30 December 1925), a plumber for a subsidiary of Solel Boneh (a construction company), and mother, Yaffa (19 February 1923 – 10 March 2012), a teacher. They lived in a ma'abara transit camp and eventually moved to a housing project in Petah Tikva. During her service in the Israel Defense Forces, Galon served as a clerk in the Paratroopers Brigade. She holds a B.E.D. degree in special education from Beit Berl College, an M.A. in philosophy of education from the Hebrew University, and completed doctoral studies in gender studies at Bar-Ilan University (without submitting a research thesis).

== Family ==
Galon is married to Pesah (born 5 December 1953). They have two sons, Yiftah (born 4 March 1980) and Nadav (born 28 January 1982), she has 6 grandchildren, and still lives in Petah Tikva.

== Political career ==
Galon was first listed on the 13th place on Meretz list in the 1992 Israeli legislative election, but the party only won twelve seats. She was then raised to 11th place on the party list in the 1996 Israeli legislative election, but Meretz only won nine seats. She elected to the Knesset in 1999 and was one of the Knesset's most outstanding members, active and highly esteemed by the entire House. She served as head of the Meretz faction in the Knesset for a decade and was a member of the main committees, the Foreign Affairs and Defense Committee and the Finance Committee. Galon founded and served as head of the Committee of Inquiry on the Trafficking of Women for seven years.

=== Outside the Knesset (1980s–1990s) ===
Galon started her political career in the 1980s; she led the successful struggle against religious coercion in Petah Tikva, was secretary general of the Ratz party, co-founded and became the first executive director of B'Tselem – The Israeli Information Center for Human Rights in the Occupied Territories. In the 1990s, Galon served as one of Meretz's co-secretaries general. Later on, Galon served as the executive director of the Tel Aviv-based International Center for Peace in the Middle East (ICPME).

In regards to military conscientious objectors of the Israel Defense Forces (IDF), the refuseniks, she has said that "Meretz should not go with the wind of refusal, but should not try to oppose it. We are a party that believes in ideological pluralism and should not bury our heads in the sand. Meretz must show empathy towards the refuseniks and must bring the matter up for public discussion and reveal the reasons why the officers are refusing to serve."

=== In and out of Knesset (1999–2017) ===
She was elected to the Knesset in 1999, and served as chairwoman of the Knesset committee for the struggle against trafficking in women. She was a member of the Knesset law and constitution committee and the Knesset committee.. She has described Israel's prison Camp 1391 as "one of the signs of totalitarian regimes and of the third world".

In 2007, Galon launched an unsuccessful bid to become the leader of Meretz in the 2008 Meretz leadership election. She expressed her belief that the party needed to reinvent itself and promote a civilian agenda, which encompasses human rights and civil liberties, in order to remain politically viable. Galon said that Meretz could not afford to watch while other parties adopted some of its long-time positions, and it must work to cement the principles of democracy and equality in Israeli society. She lost to Haim Oron, as the polls predicted.

Galon volunteered her third spot on the Meretz list for the 2009 elections as a gesture of respect for Nitzan Horowitz, but lost her seat when the party was reduced to three seats. She attributed the party's failure to its uncertain response to Israel's Operation Cast Lead, and said: "My opinion was different than that of most party members. Because Meretz is an ideological party, it must have a clear statement even in such a situation". In March 2011 she returned to the Knesset after Haim Oron retired.

On 7 February 2012, Galon was elected as Meretz party chair, with more than 60% of the vote in the party's primaries. In the 2013 legislative elections Meretz doubled its number of seats from three to six. Prior to the 2015 legislative election, Galon said during the campaign that she would resign if the party won only four seats. When preliminary results of the 2015 election indicated that the party would be reduced in representation, Galon announced she would resign as chairperson of Meretz as soon as a successor is chosen, and from the Knesset in order to open a place for Tamar Zandberg, the party's fifth-place candidate, who appeared to have lost her seat. Zandberg, Ilan Gilon and others urged Galon to reconsider her decision. Once absentee and soldier ballots were counted, Meretz gained a fifth seat.

With this success, Galon announced that she would continue as party leader. She said: "Meretz received a fifth seat from young supporters, from Israeli soldiers, who raised the party's rate of support. That allowed Meretz to maintain its strength in terms of the number of voters – some 170,000 – compared with the last election. Under the circumstances and against all odds, that is a success."

In October 2017 Galon resigned from the Knesset, but said she would remain leader of Meretz. Her seat was taken by Mossi Raz. Galon initially announced her candidacy for the 2018 Meretz leadership race, but eventually dropped out. Tamar Zandberg was elected party chair.

=== Activity after 2020; 2022 Meretz crash ===
Following her departure from the Knesset, Galon became a regular columnist for the progressive Haaretz daily newspaper. In 2020, Galon established the NGO Zulat for Equality and Human Rights, and she serves as the organization's president.

Coming out of political retirement, Galon announced on 19 July 2022 that she would run in the Meretz leadership election that was scheduled to take place on 23 August. Galon was elected, defeating Yair Golan. Galon led Meretz into a legislative election in November, in which the party failed to cross the electoral threshold, winning no seats as a result. On 17 November 2022, Galon announced her intention to resign as party leader. She also rejoined Haaretz as a columnist.
