= Avshalom Vilan =

Israeli politician and economist

- אבשלום וילן

Faction represented in the Knesset
- 1999–2009: Meretz

Personal details
- Born: 11 February 1951 (age 75) Negba, Israel

Avshalom Vilan (Hebrew: אבשלום וילן; born 11 February 1951) is an Israeli politician and economist. He served as a Knesset member for Meretz between 1999 and 2009.

== Biography ==
Avshalom Vilan was born on Kibbutz Negba. He served in the IDF as a Master Sergeant in Sayeret Matkal, the General Staff Reconnaissance Unit alongside two future prime ministers of Israel: Ehud Barak and Benjamin Netanyahu.

Vilan studied Economics and Philosophy at the Hebrew University of Jerusalem. He worked as an economist and agriculturalist before becoming an emissary for HaShomer Hatzair and Kibbutz Artzi in 1993. Upon his return to Israel in 1996 he became secretary of Kibbutz Artzi, a role he held until 1999.

Vilan continues to live in Kibbutz Negba. He is married with two children.

== Political career ==
Vilan became involved in politics in the 1970s. In 1978, he was a founding member of Peace Now. He joined the socialist Mapam and was placed 14th place on the Mapam list on the 1988 Israeli legislative election but didn't get elected since Mapam only won three seats. He became the party secretary in 1990. When Mapam merged with Ratz and Shinui to form Meretz in 1992, Vilan became a member of the new party.

In the 1999 elections Vilan was elected to the Knesset on Meretz's list. During his first term in the Knesset he chaired the Knesset Inquiry Committee on Violence in Sports.

Vilan retained his seat in the 2003 elections and chaired the same committee and also the Lobby for Public Persons as Role Models. He again retained his seat in the 2006 elections.

For two terms, Vilan chaired the Parliamentary Inquiry Committee on Violence in Sports.

Prior to the 2009 elections he won fifth place on the Meretz list. However, he lost his seat when the party was reduced to three mandates.
