= Democratic Choice =

Democratic Choice may refer to:

- Democratic Choice (Dominican Republic), a Dominican political party formed in 2015
- Democratic Choice (Israel), a minor political party in Israel formed in 1999, with Knesset membership 1999–2006
- Democratic Choice of Kazakhstan, a political party in Kazakhstan 2001–2005
- Democratic Choice of Russia, a Russian political party 1994–2001
- Democratic Choice of Russia – United Democrats, a bloc that contested the Russian legislative election, 1995
- Democratic Choice (Russia), a current political party in Russia led by Vladimir Milov

== See also ==
- Community of Democratic Choice, an intergovernmental organization established in 2005 by nine European states
