= Tichon Hadash =

High school in Tel Aviv-Yafo, Israel

Yitzhak Rabin Tichon Hadash (Hebrew תיכון חדש על שם יצחק רבין בתל אביב, i.e. Yitzhak Rabin New High School in Tel Aviv) is a secondary school in Tel Aviv located at Namir Road.

== History ==
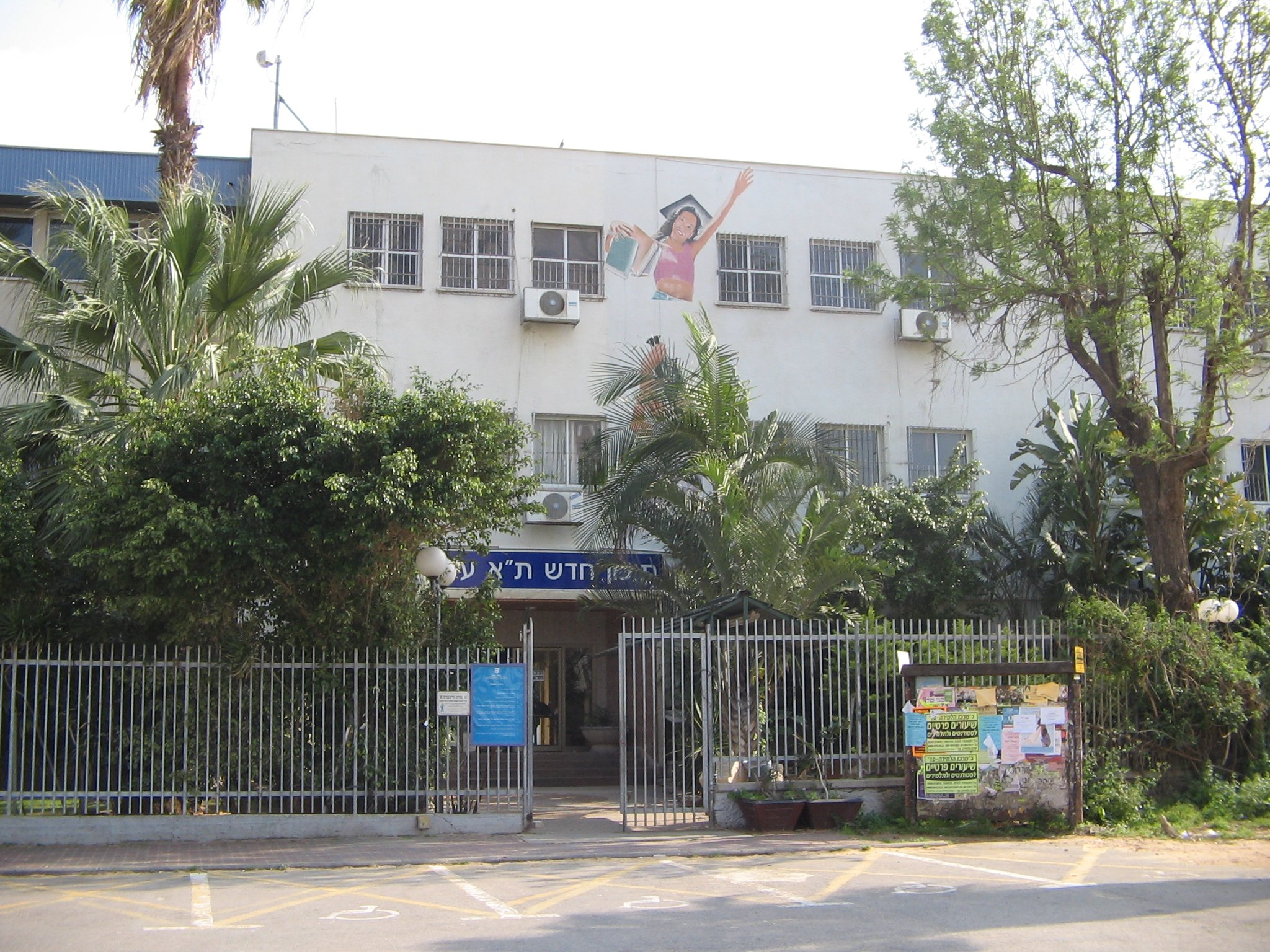
School entrance.

=== 20th century ===
The school was founded in 1937 in Tel Aviv by a cooperative association of teachers of German origin headed by Tony Halle and Aharon Berman at Hayarkon Street Three of the team members, Dr. Tony Halle, Dr. Avraham Efrat and Dr. Meir Bloch, came from Gymnasium Nordia. Among the founders was also the geography teacher Yehoyakim Paporish. Most of the students were in HaMahanot HaOlim and HaShomer HaTza'ir youth movements, and a minority were in the Scouts. In 1948, during the Israeli Independence War the students requested to finish their studies early so that they could enlist, and as a result, matriculation exams were organized for them in early April, and they enlisted on April 8, 1948. In the late 1950s as a result of the building collapsing, and as part of the development of the city, the high school was moved to its current location on Namir Road in Tel Aviv.

Tichon Hadash emphasized the relationship with students and was one of the first schools where students called teachers by their first names and the only school where uniform clothing was not introduced. Tichon Hadash was one of the first schools to organize meetings between Jewish and Arab students.

In 1965, the school won the Education Prize, given to it by Minister of Education Zalman Aran. During the 1960s, negotiations took place between the school administration and the Tel Aviv Municipality regarding the transfer of the school to the municipality's ownership, but this did not come to fruition until 1971. In the1968 school year the school changed its structure and became a six-year school for students in grades 7-12, contrary to the position of the Ministry of Education. The change stemmed from the school administration's position that the studies in grades 7–8 in elementary schools were wasted and that a higher level could be achieved in high school.

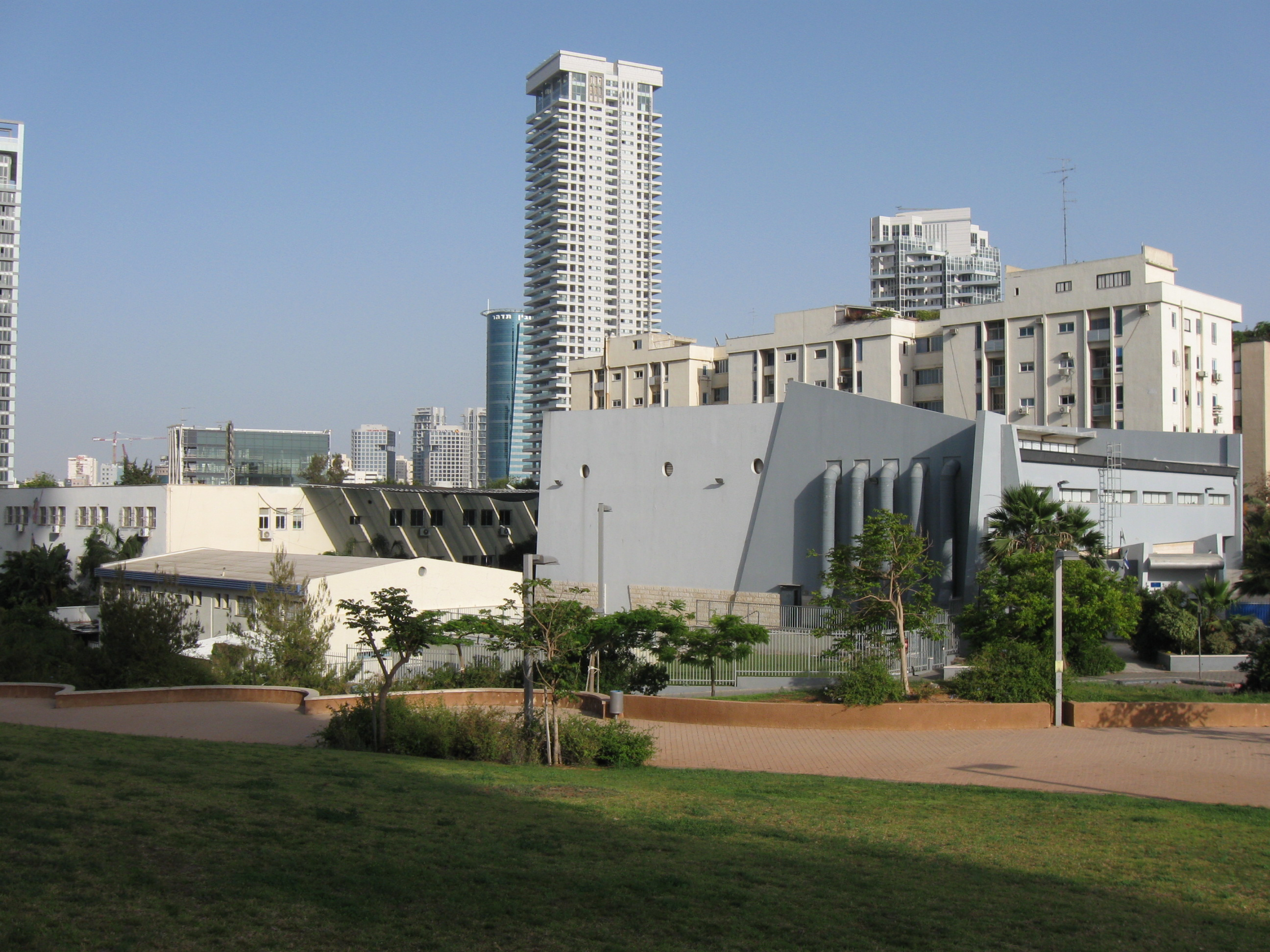
New buildings added to the school in the 21st century.

On 18 December 1995, Yitzhak Rabin's name was added to the name of the school, which is now called Yitzhak Rabin Tichon Hadash. The school is not affiliated with other institutions with a similar name, such as Rabin Tichon Hadash Kiryat Gat or Ramat Gan Tichon Hadash.

=== 21st century ===
The school hosts 1500 students and employs over 150 teachers in both divisions.

In 2022, the school's matriculation eligibility rate was 97.4%.

In April 2019, the Tichon Hadash basketball team won the World High School Championship.

== Notable alumni ==
The school was considered an elite school. Alumni of the school include many notable scientists, politicians, jurists, writers, journalists, artists and academics. Many of them credit the school as having a significant contribution to their later success in life. Among the notable alumni are:

- Ada Yonath, winner of the Nobel Prize in Chemistry in 2009
- Daniel Barenboim, classical pianist and conductor
- Deni Avdija, NBA player since 2020, led Tichon Hadash basketball team to win the Israeli high school league in 2018
- Dorit Beinisch, former president of the Israeli Supreme Court
- Roni Milo, former minister and mayor of Tel Aviv
- Gideon Sa'ar, Israeli foreign minister
- Yoram Kaniuk, writer, painter, journalist, and theatre critic
- Dani Karavan, sculptor
- Amir Pnueli, won the Turing Award for computer science in 1996
- Saharon Shelah, winner of the Wolf Prize in mathematics in 2001
- Yehoshua Sobol, playwright, writer, and theatre director
