= Ran Cohen =

Israeli politician (born 1937)

- רן כהן
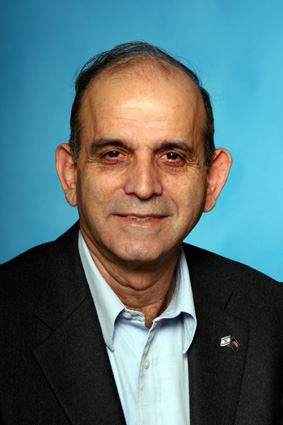

Ministerial roles
- 1999–2000: Minister of Industry and Trade

Faction represented in the Knesset
- 1984–1992: Ratz
- 1992–2009: Meretz

Personal details
- Born: Said Cohen; 20 June 1937 (age 89) Baghdad, Iraq

Ran Cohen (Hebrew: רן כהן; born 20 June 1937) is an Israeli politician and former Knesset member for Meretz.

== Biography ==
Said Cohen (later Ran Cohen) was born in Baghdad, Iraq. At the age of 13, he immigrated to Israel through Iran. He Hebraized his first name after his arrival in Israel, renaming himself "Ran". He grew up in kibbutz Gan Shmuel, where he absorbed socialist and Zionist ideologies. During his military service he rose to the rank of colonel (Aluf Mishne). After the military he obtained a B.A. in philosophy and economics at Tel Aviv University.

Cohen is a resident of Mevaseret Zion. He is married and has four children.

== Political career ==
In 1970 he was elected as Secretary of Kibbutz Gan Shmuel.

In 1984 he was first elected to the Knesset as a member of Ratz (headed by Shulamit Aloni) after he headed the Left Camp of Israel peace movement.

Starting in 1992, he served as a member of Meretz, a dovish left wing party which resulted from the merger of Mapam, Ratz and Shinui. He was Minister of Industry and Trade in Ehud Barak's government. He headed several Knesset committees, including the Security and Foreign Affairs committee.

Cohen is most identified with "Law of Public Housing", which allowed residents of houses supplied by the state to assume ownership on the house. He also pass a law regulating minimum wage.

After Meretz merged with Yossi Beilin's Shahar Movement and renamed itself Yachad in 2004, Cohen ran for the chairmanship of the new party, but lost to Beilin. Supporters of Cohen blamed his defeat on anti-Mizrahi racism within the party and pointed out that he was the only non-Ashkenazi to reach a senior position within it.

On 1 November 2008, following Beilin's resignation, he announced his intention to retire from political life and not to seek a spot on the party's list ahead of the upcoming general elections. He said "I want to start chapter three of my life, to do things for my soul: writing, lecturing, taking part in social and public initiatives that interest me".

== Public service career ==
In 2011, Cohen was elected Chairman of the Standards Institution of Israel (SII).
