= List of members of the thirteenth Knesset =

The 120 members of the thirteenth Knesset were elected on 23 June 1992. The breakdown by party was as follows:

- Labor Party: 44
- Likud: 32
- Meretz: 12
- Tzomet: 8
- National Religious Party: 6
- Shas: 6
- United Torah Judaism: 4
- Hadash: 3
- Moledet: 3
- Arab Democratic Party: 2

== List of members ==
Member	Party	Notes
Shmuel Avital	Labor Party	
Uzi Baram	Labor Party	
Yossi Beilin	Labor Party	
Binyamin Ben-Eliezer	Labor Party	
Eli Ben-Menachem	Labor Party	
Shlomo Bohbot	Labor Party	
Avraham Burg	Labor Party	
Ra'anan Cohen	Labor Party	
Eli Dayan	Labor Party	
Yael Dayan	Labor Party	
Rafael Edri	Labor Party	
Rafi Elul	Labor Party	
Gedalia Gal	Labor Party	
Micha Goldman	Labor Party	
Eli Goldschmidt	Labor Party	
Mordechai Gur	Labor Party	
Michael Harish	Labor Party	
Dalia Itzik	Labor Party	
Avigdor Kahalani	Labor Party	Left party to establish the Third Way
Yossi Katz	Labor Party	
Israel Kessar	Labor Party	
Yoram Lass	Labor Party	
David Libai	Labor Party	
Masha Lubelsky	Labor Party	
Nawaf Massalha	Labor Party	
Hagai Meirom	Labor Party	
Ora Namir	Labor Party	
Ori Orr	Labor Party	
Shimon Peres	Labor Party	
Amir Peretz	Labor Party	
Yitzhak Rabin	Labor Party	
Haim Ramon	Labor Party	
Gideon Sagi	Labor Party	
Moshe Shahal	Labor Party	
Ya'akov Shefi	Labor Party	
Shimon Shetreet	Labor Party	
Avraham Shochat	Labor Party	
Efraim Sneh	Labor Party	
Salah Tarif	Labor Party	
Yosef Vanunu	Labor Party	
Shevah Weiss	Labor Party	
Avraham Yehezkel	Labor Party	
Emanuel Zisman	Labor Party	Left party to establish the Third Way
Nissim Zvili	Labor Party	
Shaul Amor	Likud	
Assad Assad	Likud	
Benny Begin	Likud	
Eliyahu Ben-Elissar	Likud	
Naomi Blumenthal	Likud	
Michael Eitan	Likud	
Ovadia Eli	Likud	
Efraim Gur	Likud	Left party to sit as an independent
Tzachi Hanegbi	Likud	
Abraham Hirchson	Likud	
Moshe Katsav	Likud	
Haim Kaufman	Likud	
Uzi Landau	Likud	
David Levy	Likud	Left party to establish Gesher
Limor Livnat	Likud	
David Magen	Likud	Left party to establish Gesher
Joshua Matza	Likud	
David Mena	Likud	
Dan Meridor	Likud	
Roni Milo	Likud	
Ron Nachman	Likud	
Benjamin Netanyahu	Likud	
Moshe Nissim	Likud	
Ehud Olmert	Likud	
Gideon Patt	Likud	
Silvan Shalom	Likud	
Ya'akov Shamai	Likud	
Yitzhak Shamir	Likud	
Ariel Sharon	Likud	
Meir Sheetrit	Likud	
Dov Shilansky	Likud	
Dan Tichon	Likud	
Shulamit Aloni	Meretz	
Naomi Chazan	Meretz	
Ran Cohen	Meretz	
Anat Maor	Meretz	
Haim Oron	Meretz	
Avraham Poraz	Meretz	
Amnon Rubinstein	Meretz	
Walid Haj Yahia	Meretz	
Yossi Sarid	Meretz	
Binyamin Temkin	Meretz	
Yair Tzaban	Meretz	
David Zucker	Meretz	
Pini Badash	Tzomet	
Haim Dayan	Tzomet	
Rafael Eitan	Tzomet	
Alex Goldfarb	Tzomet	Left party to establish Yiud, before breaking away to establish Atid
Moshe Peled	Tzomet	
Esther Salmovitz	Tzomet	Left party to establish Yiud, before breaking away to establish Atid
Eliezer Sandberg	Tzomet	
Gonen Segev	Tzomet	Left party to establish Yiud
Yigal Bibi	National Religious Party	
Zevulon Hammer	National Religious Party	
Yitzhak Levy	National Religious Party	
Hanan Porat	National Religious Party	
Avner Shaki	National Religious Party	
Shaul Yahalom	National Religious Party	
Yosef Azran	Shas	Left party to sit as an independent
Shlomo Benizri	Shas	
Aryeh Deri	Shas	
Aryeh Gamliel	Shas	
Moshe Maya	Shas	
Rafael Pinhasi	Shas	
Shmuel Halpert	United Torah Judaism	
Yitzhak Peretz	United Torah Judaism	
Menachem Porush	United Torah Judaism	
Avraham Yosef Shapira	United Torah Judaism	Represented Agudat Yisrael when party split
Tamar Gozansky	Hadash	
Hashem Mahameed	Hadash	
Tawfiq Ziad	Hadash	
Yosef Ba-Gad	Moledet	Left party to sit as an independent
Shaul Gutman	Moledet	Left party to establish Yamin Yisrael
Rehavam Ze'evi	Moledet	
Abdulwahab Darawshe	Arab Democratic Party	
Taleb el-Sana	Arab Democratic Party	

=== Replacements ===
MK	Replaced	Date	Party	Notes
Avraham Ravitz	Yitzhak Peretz	16 July 1992	United Torah Judaism	Represented Degel HaTorah when party split
Ariel Weinstein	Roni Milo	30 December 1993	Likud	
Avraham Verdiger	Menachem Porush	28 June 1994	United Torah Judaism	Represented Agudat Yisrael when party split
Moshe Gafni	Shmuel Halpert	28 June 1994	United Torah Judaism	Represented Degel HaTorah when party split
Saleh Saleem	Tawfiq Ziad	7 July 1994	Hadash	
Haneh Hadad	Avraham Burg	5 July 1995	Labor Party	
Avraham Katz-Oz	Mordechai Gur	16 July 1995	Labor Party	
Yosef Ahimeir	Haim Kaufman	7 August 1995	Likud	
Nava Arad	Yitzhak Rabin	5 November 1995	Labor Party	Left party to sit as an independent
Michael Ratzon	Ariel Weinstein	10 March 1996	Likud	
Zvi Nir	Ora Namir	21 May 1996	Labor Party	
Pini Shomer	Avraham Katz-Oz	28 May 1996	Labor Party	
