= Twenty-sixth government of Israel =

1995–96 government led by Shimon Peres

Second Peres Cabinet
- 26th Cabinet of Israel

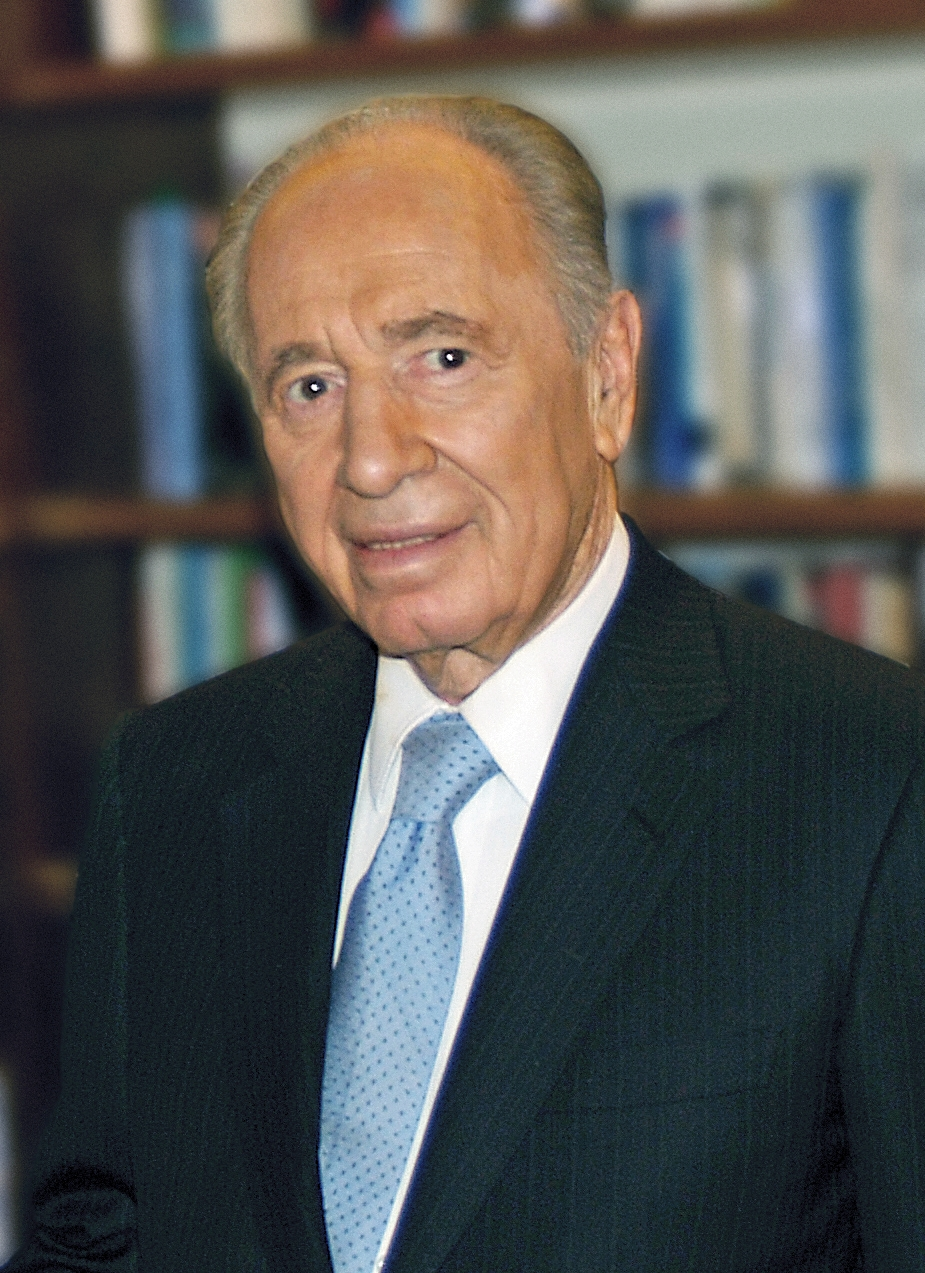
- Date formed: 22 November 1995
- Date dissolved: 18 June 1996

People and organisations
- Head of state: Ezer Weizman
- Head of government: Shimon Peres
- Member parties: Labor; Meretz; Yiud
- Status in legislature: Coalition government
- Opposition party: Likud
- Opposition leader: Benjamin Netanyahu

History
- Legislature term: 13th Knesset
- Predecessor: 25th cabinet of Israel
- Successor: 27th cabinet of Israel

The twenty-sixth government of Israel was formed by Shimon Peres of the Labor Party on 22 November 1995, following the assassination of Yitzhak Rabin on 4 November. Peres kept the same coalition as previously, namely the Labor Party, Meretz and Yiud, which together held only 58 of the 120 seats in the Knesset. However, the government was also supported, but not joined, by Hadash and the Arab Democratic Party, which held an additional five seats between them.

Although the Labor Party won the May 1996 Knesset elections, Peres was narrowly defeated by Binyamin Netanyahu in the country's first election for Prime Minister, meaning that the Likud leader formed the twenty-seventh government, which he completed on 18 June.

== Cabinet members ==
Position	Person	Party
Prime Minister	Shimon Peres	Labor Party
Minister of Agriculture	Ya'akov Tzur	Not an MK ^{1}
Minister of Communications	Shulamit Aloni	Meretz
Minister of Defense	Shimon Peres	Labor Party
Minister of Education, Culture and Sport	Amnon Rubinstein	Meretz
Minister of Energy and Infrastructure	Gonen Segev	Yiud
Minister of the Environment	Yossi Sarid	Meretz
Minister of Finance	Avraham Shochat	Labor Party
Minister of Foreign Affairs	Ehud Barak ^{2}	Labor Party
Minister of Health	Efraim Sneh	Labor Party
Minister of Housing and Construction	Binyamin Ben-Eliezer	Labor Party
Minister of Immigrant Absorption	Yair Tzaban	Meretz
Minister of Industry and Trade	Michael Harish	Labor Party
Minister of Internal Affairs	Haim Ramon	Labor Party
Minister of Internal Security	Moshe Shahal	Labor Party
Minister of Justice	David Libai	Labor Party
Minister of Labour and Social Welfare	Ora Namir (until 21 May 1996)^{3}	Labor Party
Minister in the Prime Minister's Office	Yossi Beilin	Labor Party
Minister of Religious Affairs	Shimon Shetreet	Labor Party
Minister of Science and the Arts	Shulamit Aloni	Meretz
Minister of Tourism	Uzi Baram	Labor Party
Minister of Transportation	Yisrael Kessar	Labor Party
Minister without Portfolio	Yehuda Amital	Not an MK ^{4}
Deputy Minister of Agriculture	Walid Haj Yahia	Meretz
Deputy Minister of Defense	Ori Orr (from 27 November 1995)	Labor Party
Deputy Minister of Education, Culture and Sport	Micha Goldman	Labor Party
Deputy Minister of Foreign Affairs	Eli Dayan	Labor Party
Deputy Minister of Health	Nawaf Massalha	Labor Party
Deputy Minister of Housing and Construction	Eli Ben-Menachem	Labor Party
Deputy Minister of Housing and Construction	Alex Goldfarb	Yiud
Deputy Minister of Industry and Trade	Masha Lubelsky	Labor Party
Deputy Minister of Internal Affairs	Salah Tarif	Labor Party

^{1} Although Tzur was not a Knesset member at the time, he had previously been elected on the Alignment list, and was a Labor Party member.

^{2} Although Barak was not a Knesset member at the time, he was elected to the next Knesset on the Labor Party list.

^{3} Namir resigned from the government after being appointed ambassador to China.

^{4} Although Amital was never a Knesset member, he was the founder of Meimad.
