= Twenty-fifth government of Israel =

1992–95 government led by Yitzhak Rabin

Second Rabin Cabinet
- 25th Cabinet of Israel

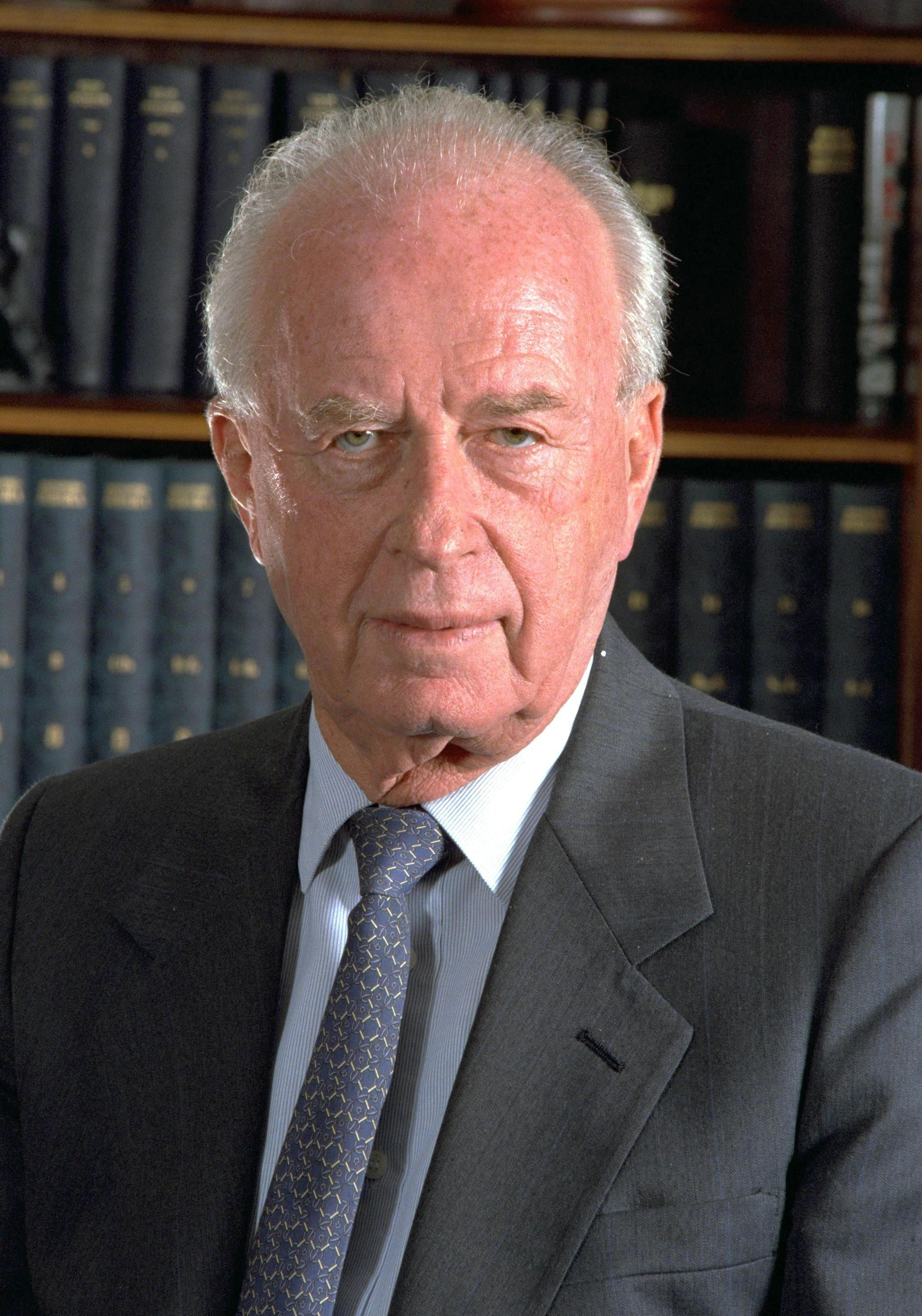
- Date formed: 13 July 1992
- Date dissolved: 22 November 1995

People and organisations
- Head of state: Chaim Herzog (until 13 May 1993); Ezer Weizman (after 13 May 1993)
- Head of government: Yitzhak Rabin (until 4 November 1995); Shimon Peres (interim after 4 November 1995)
- Member parties: Labor; Meretz; Yiud (since 1995); Shas (until 1993)
- Status in legislature: Centre-left coalition
- Opposition party: Likud
- Opposition leader: Yitzhak Shamir (until 1993); Benjamin Netanyahu (since 1993)

History
- Election: 1992 Israeli legislative election
- Legislature term: 13th Knesset
- Predecessor: 24th cabinet of Israel
- Successor: 26th cabinet of Israel

The twenty-fifth government of Israel was formed by Yitzhak Rabin of the Labor Party on 13 July 1992, after the party's victory in the June elections. The coalition also contained the new Meretz party (an alliance of Ratz, Mapam, and Shinui) and Shas, and held 62 of the 120 seats in the Knesset. The government was also supported, but not joined, by Hadash and the Arab Democratic Party, which held an additional five seats between them.

Shas left the government on 14 September 1993, but the coalition was joined by the new Yiud faction (a three-member breakaway from Tzomet) on 9 January 1995.

This government significantly reformed Israel's economy, as well as its education and healthcare systems. Privatization of business increased, moving away from the country's traditionally socialized economy, which had been largely set up by the forerunners to the Labour Party. The scheme was described by Moshe Arens as a "privatization frenzy". In 1993, it set up the "Yozma" program, under which attractive tax incentives were offered to foreign venture capital funds that invested in Israel and promised to double any investment with government funding. As a result, foreign venture capital funds invested heavily in the growing Israeli high-tech industry, contributing to Israel's economic growth and status as a world leader in high-tech. In 1995, the National Health Insurance Law was passed. The law created Israel's universal health care system, moving away from the traditionally Histadrut-dominated health insurance system. Doctors' wages were also raised by 50%. Education spending was raised by 70%, with new colleges being built in Israel's peripheral areas, and teachers' wages rising by one-fifth. The government also launched new public works projects such as the Cross-Israel Highway and an expansion of Ben Gurion Airport.

Rabin was assassinated on 4 November 1995, with Shimon Peres taking over as Interim Prime Minister until forming the twenty-sixth government on 22 November.

== Cabinet members ==
Position	Person	Faction in Knesset (Party)
Prime Minister	Yitzhak Rabin (until 4 November 1995)	Labor Party
Prime Minister	Shimon Peres (interim from 5 November)	Labor Party
Minister of Agriculture	Ya'akov Tzur	Not an MK (Labor Party)
Minister of Communications	Moshe Shahal (until 7 June 1993)	Labor Party
Minister of Communications	Shulamit Aloni	Meretz (Ratz)
Minister of Defense	Yitzhak Rabin (until 4 November 1995)	Labor Party
Minister of Defense	Shimon Peres (from 5 November)	Labor Party
Minister of Economics and Planning	Shimon Shetreet (until 18 July 1995)	Labor Party
Minister of Economics and Planning	Yossi Beilin (from 18 July 1995)	Labor Party
Minister of Education and Culture ^{1}	Shulamit Aloni (until 11 May 1993)	Meretz (Ratz)
Minister of Education and Culture ^{1}	Yitzhak Rabin (11 May 1993 - 7 June 1993)	Labor Party
Minister of Education and Culture ^{1}	Amnon Rubinstein (from 30 May 1994)	Meretz (Shinui)
Minister of Energy and Infrastructure	Amnon Rubinstein (until 7 June 1993)	Meretz (Shinui)
Minister of Energy and Infrastructure	Moshe Shahal (7 June 1993 - 9 January 1995)	Labor Party
Minister of Energy and Infrastructure	Gonen Segev (from 9 January 1995)	Yiud
Minister of the Environment	Ora Namir (until 31 December 1992)	Labor Party
Minister of the Environment	Yossi Sarid (from 31 December 1992)	Meretz (Ratz)
Minister of Finance	Avraham Shochat	Labor Party
Minister of Foreign Affairs	Shimon Peres	Labor Party
Minister of Health	Haim Ramon (until 8 February 1994)	Labor Party
Minister of Health	Yitzhak Rabin (8 February - 1 June 1994)	Labor Party
Minister of Health	Efraim Sneh (from 1 June 1994)	Labor Party
Minister of Housing and Construction	Binyamin Ben-Eliezer	Labor Party
Minister of Immigrant Absorption	Yair Tzaban	Meretz (Mapam)
Minister of Industry and Trade	Michael Harish	Labor Party
Minister of Internal Affairs	Aryeh Deri (until 11 May 1993)	Shas
Minister of Internal Affairs	Aryeh Deri (7 June - 14 September 1993)	Shas
Minister of Internal Affairs	Yitzhak Rabin (14 September 1993 - 27 February 1995)	Labor Party
Minister of Internal Affairs	Uzi Baram (27 February - 7 June 1995)	Labor Party
Minister of Internal Affairs	David Libai (19 June - 18 July 1995)	Labor Party
Minister of Internal Affairs	Ehud Barak (from 18 July 1995)	Not an MK (Labor Party)
Minister of Jerusalem Affairs	Yitzhak Rabin (until 31 December 1992)	Labor Party
Minister of Justice	David Libai	Labor Party
Minister of Labour and Social Welfare	Yitzhak Rabin (until 31 December 1992)	Labor Party
Minister of Labour and Social Welfare	Ora Namir (from 31 December 1992)	Labor Party
Minister of Police	Moshe Shahal	Labor Party
Minister of Religious Affairs	Yitzhak Rabin (until 27 January 1995)	Labor Party
Minister of Religious Affairs	Shimon Shetreet (from 27 January 1995)	Labor Party
Minister of Science and Technology	Amnon Rubinstein (until 31 December 1992)	Meretz (Shinui)
Minister of Science and Technology	Shimon Shetreet (31 December 1992 - 7 June 1993)	Labor Party
Minister of Science and Technology	Shulamit Aloni (from 7 June 1993)	Meretz (Ratz)
Minister of Tourism	Uzi Baram	Labor Party
Minister of Transportation	Yisrael Kessar	Labor Party
Minister without Portfolio	Shulamit Aloni (11 May - 7 June 1993)	Meretz (Ratz)
Minister without Portfolio	Aryeh Deri (11 May - 7 June 1993)	Shas
Deputy Minister in the Prime Minister's Office	Eli Ben-Menachem (until 8 April 1993)	Labor Party
Deputy Minister of Agriculture	Walid Haj Yahia	Meretz (Mapam)
Deputy Minister of Defense	Mordechai Gur (until 16 July 1995)^{2}	Labor Party
Deputy Minister of Education and Culture	Moshe Maya (until 12 September 1993)	Shas
Deputy Minister of Education and Culture	Micha Goldman	Labor Party
Deputy Minister of Finance	Rafael Pinhasi (until 31 December 1992)	Shas
Deputy Minister of Foreign Affairs	Yossi Beilin (until 17 July 1995)	Labor Party
Deputy Minister of Foreign Affairs	Eli Dayan (from 24 July 1995)	Labor Party
Deputy Minister of Health	Nawaf Massalha	Labor Party
Deputy Minister of Housing and Construction	Aryeh Gamliel (until 9 September 1993)	Shas
Deputy Minister of Housing and Construction	Ran Cohen (until 31 December 1992)	Meretz (Ratz)
Deputy Minister of Housing and Construction	Eli Ben-Menachem (from 8 April 1993)	Labor Party
Deputy Minister of Housing and Construction	Alex Goldfarb (from 2 January 1995)	Yiud
Deputy Minister of Industry and Trade	Masha Lubelsky	Labor Party
Deputy Minister of Religious Affairs	Rafael Pinhasi (31 December 1992 - 14 September 1993)	Shas

^{1} When Rubinstein was appointed to the post in 1994, it was renamed the Minister of Education, Culture and Sport.

^{2} Died in office.
