= Atid (political party) =

Atid עתיד
- Leader: Alex Goldfarb
- Founded: 27 November 1995
- Dissolved: 1996
- Split from: Yiud
- Merged into: Center Party
- Ideology: Liberalism
- Most MKs: 2 (1995–1996)
- Fewest MKs: 2 (1995–1996)

Atid (Hebrew: עתיד, lit. Future) was a short-lived liberal Political faction in Israel in the mid-1990s.

== Background ==
The faction was established on 27 November 1995 during the 13th Knesset as a breakaway from Yiud, itself a breakaway from Tzomet following disagreements between party leader Rafael Eitan and three other MKs. Two of the MKs who had left Tzomet to form Yiud, Alex Goldfarb and Esther Salmovitz, then broke away to form Atid, leaving Gonen Segev as the only remaining member of Yiud.

The faction remained part of Shimon Peres' governing coalition and Goldfarb retained his post as Deputy Minister of Housing and Construction. After the Knesset term ended, the faction was dissolved and did not run in the 1996 elections.

It was subsumed by the Center Party.

== List of Knesset members ==
Name	Years in office	Government roles	Other roles
Alex Goldfarb	1995–1996	Deputy Minister of Housing and Construction	
Esther Salmovitz	1995–1996		
