= Alex Goldfarb =

Alexander or Alex Goldfarb may refer to:

- Alexander Goldfarb (biologist), microbiologist, activist, and author
- Alex Goldfarb (politician), Israeli politician and electrician
