= Assad Assad =

Israeli Druze former officer, diplomat, and politician

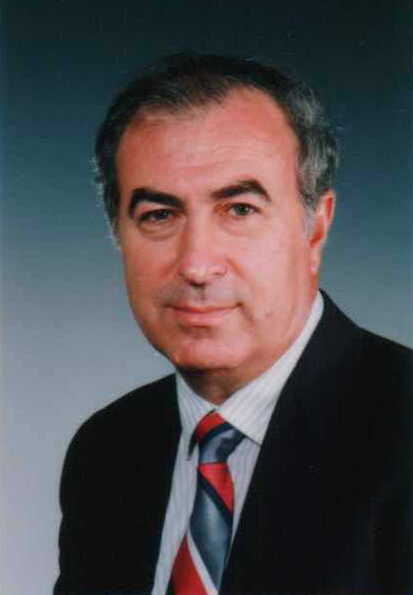
- Assad in the 1990s

Faction represented in the Knesset
- 1992–1996: Likud

Personal details
- Born: 10 February 1944 (age 82) Beit Jann, Mandatory Palestine

Assad Assad (Arabic: أسعد أسعد, Hebrew: אסעד אסעד; born 10 February 1944) is an Israeli Druze former officer, diplomat and politician who served as a member of the Knesset for Likud between 1992 and 1996.

== Biography ==
Born in Beit Jann during the Mandate era, Assad joined the IDF, and remained in it as a career soldier. He was discharged holding the rank of colonel. He gained a BA in political science and history of the Middle East from the University of Haifa, and in 1980 became a member of the Israeli delegation to the United Nations. He later became an advisor to the Prime Minister on Druze affairs, and was also a member of the Israeli delegation to the Madrid peace talks in 1991.

He was elected to the Knesset on the Likud list in 1992, and sat on several committees until losing his seat in the 1996 elections. He was one of the few Likud MKs to vote for the Oslo Accords.
