= Mekhora (political party) =

Mekhora מכורה
- Leader: Moshe Peled
- Founded: 4 March 1999
- Dissolved: 4 March 1999
- Split from: Tzomet
- Merged into: Moledet
- Political position: Right-wing
- Most MKs: 1 (1999)
- Fewest MKs: 1 (1999)

Mekhora (Hebrew: מכורה, lit. 'Homeland') was a short-lived one-man political faction in Israel in the late 1990s.

== Background ==
The faction was formed on 4 March 1999, during the 14th Knesset, when MK Moshe Peled, a Deputy Speaker of the Knesset and Deputy Minister of Education, Culture and Sport, left Tzomet. The faction immediately merged into Moledet.

Peled lost his seat in the 1999 elections, in which Moledet ran as part of the National Union.
