= Esther Salmovitz =

Israeli lawyer and former politician (born 1948)

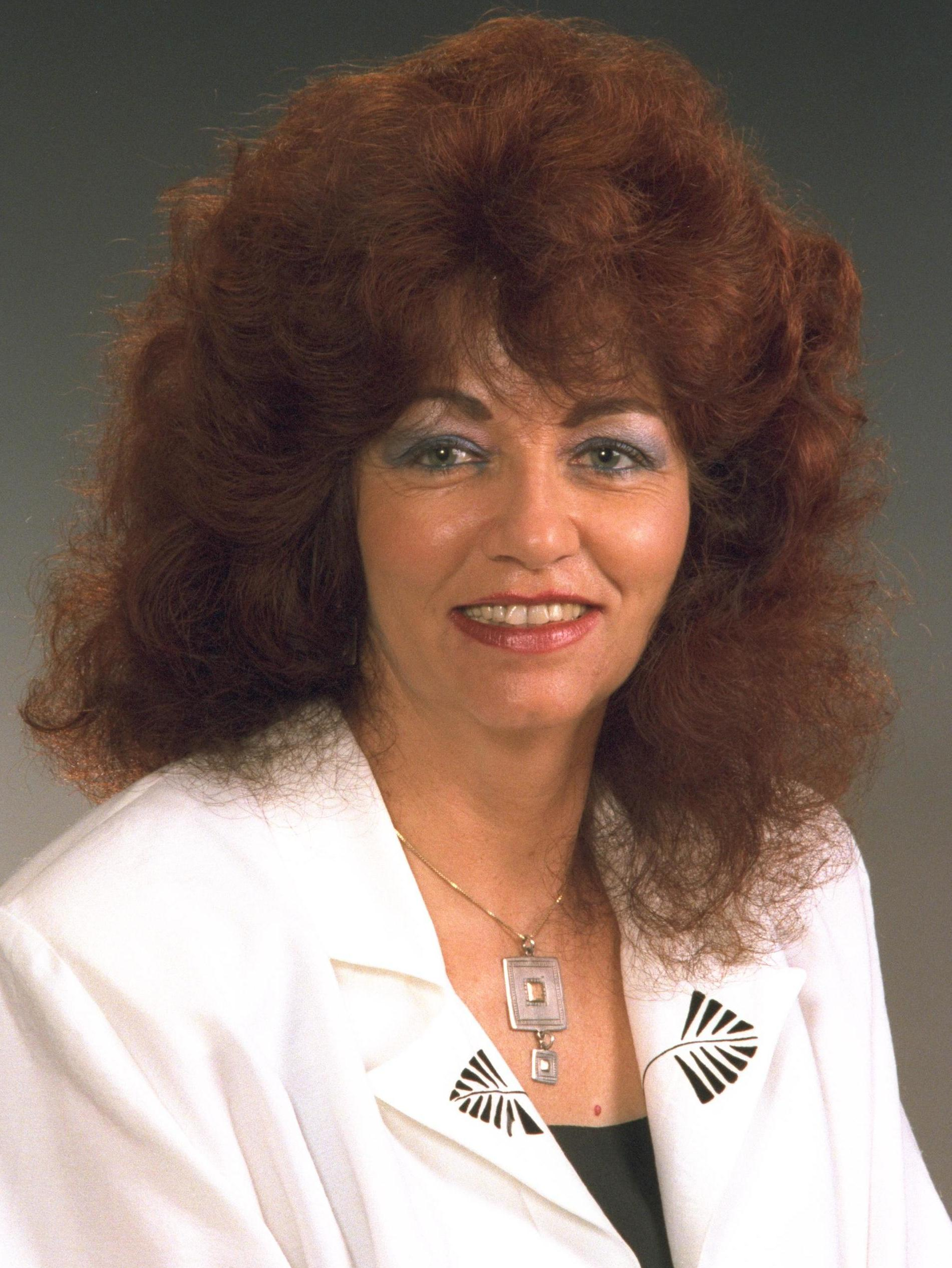
- Salmovitz in 1992

Faction represented in the Knesset
- 1992–1994: Tzomet
- 1994–1995: Yiud
- 1995–1996: Atid

Personal details
- Born: 8 April 1948 (age 77); Carei, Romania

Esther Salmovitz (Hebrew: אסתר סלמוביץ; born 8 April 1948) is an Israeli lawyer and former politician who served as a member of the Knesset between 1992 and 1996.

== Biography ==
Born in Carei, Romania in 1948, Salmovitz immigrated to Israel in 1950. After high school she studied real estate law, and took Open University course in history of the people of Israel.

She joined the Tzomet party, and chaired its Nahariya branch. She headed the party in Nahariya city council, and was a member of its Absorption and Education Committee. She was elected to the Knesset on the Tzomet list in 1992. However, on 7 February 1994 she left the party together with Alex Goldfarb and Gonen Segev to form Yiud, which joined Yitzhak Rabin's coalition government. On 27 November 1995 she and Goldfarb left Yiud to establish Atid. They both lost their seats in the 1996 elections, in which the party did not participate.

After leaving politics she completed a law degree at Netanya Academic College.
