= Yigal Cohen =

Israeli politician

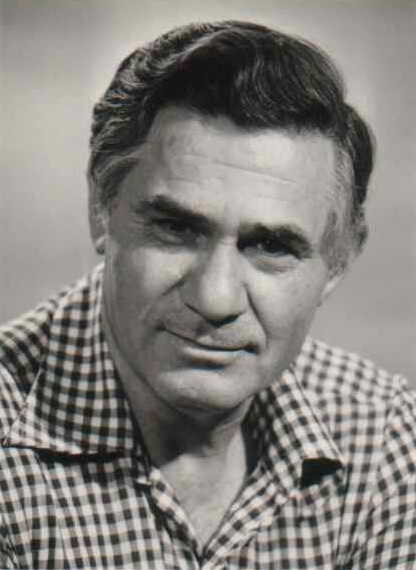
- Cohen during his time in the Knesset

Faction represented in the Knesset
- 1974–1988: Likud

Personal details
- Born: 1928 Tel Adashim, Mandatory Palestine
- Died: 6 December 1988 (aged 59–60)

Yigal Cohen (Hebrew: יגאל כהן; 1928 – 6 December 1988) was an Israeli politician who served as a member of the Knesset for Likud between 1974 and 1988.

== Biography ==
Born in Tel Adashim during the Mandate era, during his youth Cohen co-ordinated the Youth Committee of the Moshavim Movement, and was a member of both the HaNoar HaOved and Mapai youth leadership secretariats. He attended the Hebrew University of Jerusalem and was a member of the Palmach's first brigade. He worked as a trainer for immigrant moshavim in the Jerusalem corridor, and later as a Gadna trainer in Europe, the United States and Africa for the Ministry of Defense.

In 1965 he was part of the Rafi group that broke away from Mapai, and in 1968 switched to the new National List party, chairing its group in the Histadrut's Executive Committee. He won a place on the Likud list (an alliance of several right-wing parties including the National List, Herut and the Liberal Party) for the 1973 Knesset elections. Although he failed to win a seat, he entered the Knesset on 23 December 1974 as a replacement for Ariel Sharon, who had resigned his seat. He was re-elected in 1977, 1981 and 1984, after which he was appointed Deputy Speaker. He retained his seat again in the November 1988 elections, but died shortly after taking his seat, and was replaced by Michael Kleiner.
