= Haim Dayan =

Israeli politician

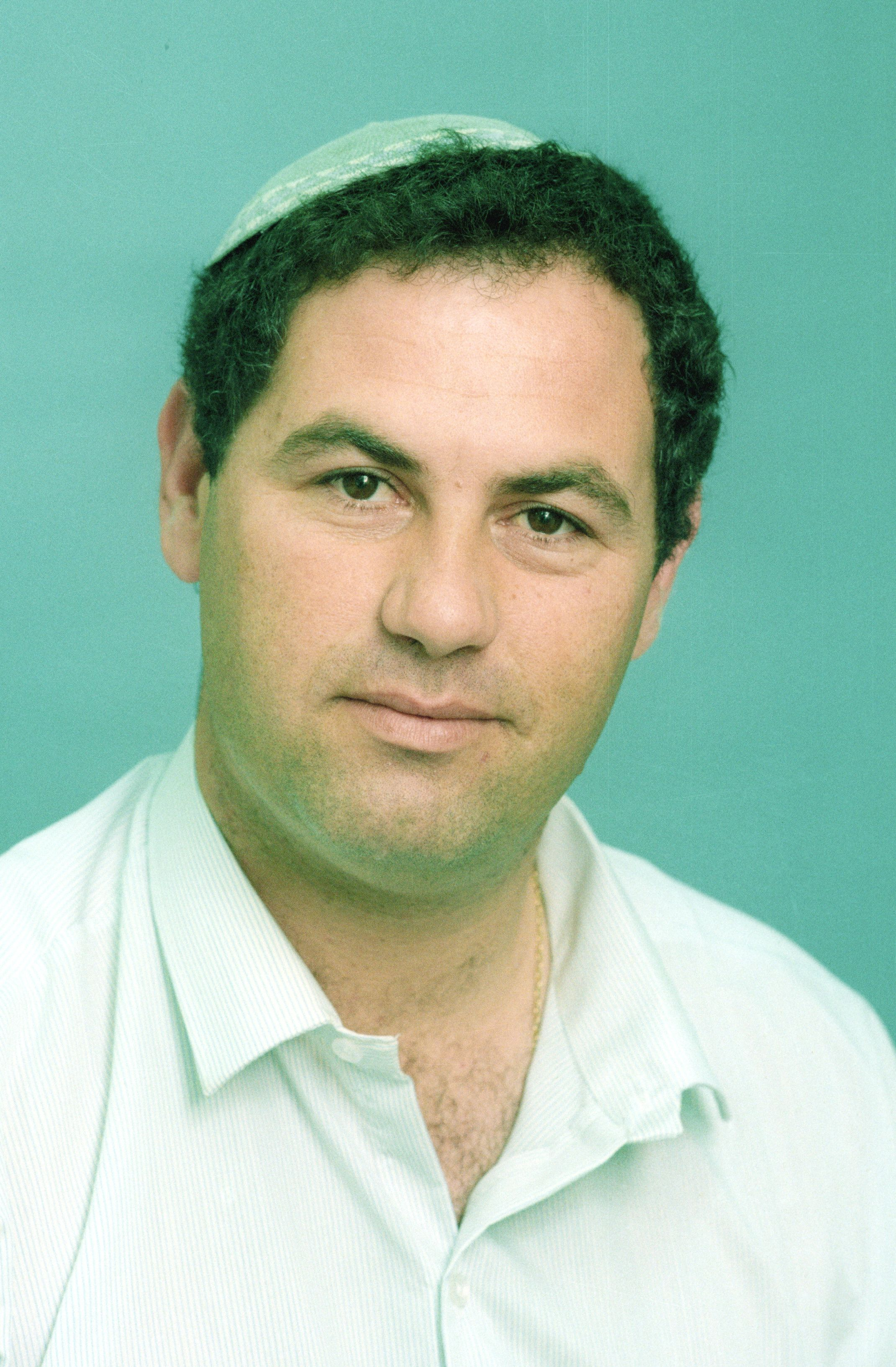
- Dayan in 1992

Faction represented in the Knesset
- 1992–1999: Tzomet

Personal details
- Born: 24 March 1960 (age 65) Migdal HaEmek, Israel

Haim Dayan (Hebrew: חיים דיין; born 24 March 1960) is an Israeli former politician who served as a member of the Knesset for Tzomet between 1992 and 1999.

== Biography ==
Born in Migdal HaEmek, Dayan served as a commander in the Israel Police at Yokneam Illit, and was chief of the civil guard in Migdal HaEmek. A member of Likud during his youth, he became the chairman of the Migdal HaEmek branch of Tzomet. He was elected to the Knesset on the party's list in 1992. After re-election on the Likud-Gesher-Tzomet list in 1996, he served as a Deputy Speaker of the Knesset.

He was placed third on the Tzomet list for the 1999 elections, but the party failed to cross the electoral threshold, and he lost his seat.

Dayan was married twice. In 1996 his first wife accused him of battery, but later withdrew the complaint. He was declared bankrupt in 2004.
