= Tzomet =

Tzomet צומת
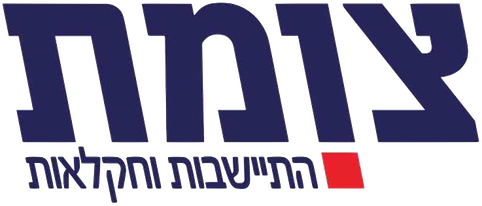
- Leader: Moshe Gerin
- Founder: Rafael Eitan
- Founded: 1983 (first); 1987 (second)
- Dissolved: 1986 (first)
- Split from: Tehiya (1987)
- Ideology: Zionism; National conservatism Economic liberalism Secularism; Right-wing populism Agrarianism
- Political position: Right-wing
- National affiliation: Tehiya-Tzomet (1984-1986); Tehiya (1986-1987)
- Colours: Blue; Red
- Most MKs: 8 (1992)
- Knesset: 0 / 120

Election symbol
- ץ (1988–1999, 2009) צ (2003) כץ (2006) זץ (2019–)

Website
- tsomet.co.il

Tzomet (Hebrew: צוֹמֶת, lit. 'Crossroads') is a small, right-wing political party in Israel.

== Raful period (1983-1999) ==
The party was founded by General Rafael "Raful" Eitan in 1983, after his retirement from the position of chief-of-staff in 1982. He headed it throughout its existence, and modeled it in his spirit as a secular, right-wing party with a strong agricultural side. Many of Tzomet's members and MKs were neighbors of Eitan in Tel Adashim (a small moshav). Tzomet ran for the 1984 elections in a joint list with the Tehiya party, and Eitan was its only member of the Knesset. In 1986, Tzomet briefly disbanded and folded into Tehiya. However, in 1987, Eitan's disagreements with the Tehiya leader Geulah Cohen came to a head, and he revitalised Tzomet as a party and a single-member faction.

It ran in the 1988 elections, winning two seats. The party joined Yitzhak Shamir's government in 1990, and Eitan was appointed Minister of Agriculture. However, the party left the coalition in December 1991 in protest at Shamir's participation in the Madrid Conference. In the 1992 elections, Tzomet rode a wave of secularist sentiment, parallel to the new left-wing secularist Meretz, gaining the support of many young Israelis, leading to a surprising result of eight seats. The party also benefitted from the misfortunes of other right-wing parties. Likudniks who were angered with the Madrid Conference switched to Tzomet. Despite polls up to election week predicting it would maintain its three seats, Tehiya surprisingly fell below the threshold and lost all their seats.

Tzomet attracted a coalition of lower-class voters, who supported Eitan's military education policy, and middle-class voters, who supported his stance against Haredi draft-dodging, while all Tzomet voters admired Eitan's military career and his tough stance on terrorism. When Yitzhak Rabin's Labor Party won the election, Tzomet was hopeful to join a new coalition. Despite being right-wing on the Israel-Palestine conflict, Tzomet agreed with Rabin's privatisation plan, and agreed with Meretz on separating religion and the state. Eitan and Tzomet officials sent a delegation to negotiate a coalition with Labor. Due to Eitan's support for West Bank settlements, refusal of a Palestinian state, and a stricter security policy on the eve of the Oslo Accords, coalition talks broke down, and Tzomet found itself in the opposition again.

The party's surprising success was also its downfall. None of the new MKs had any political experience, their ideologies strayed away from their leader, and most were completely unknown. Due to Raful's position in his party, the party was jokingly described as "Raful and the seven dwarfs". Allegations of tyrannical behavior by Raful were raised, and in February 1992, three members: Gonen Segev, Esther Salmovitz, and Alex Goldfarb—left and founded the Yiud party (which then also splintered into Atid). The three left the party because Segev was offered the position of Minister of Energy by Yitzhak Rabin if he voted in favour of the Oslo Accords, which Tzomet opposed, and which would not have passed without his vote.

The splintering and infighting reduced the popularity of the party, despite this, ahead of the 1996 elections, Eitan became known as a potential candidate for PM. In the end Tzomet chose to run in a joint list with the Likud and Gesher under the name "National Camp List". Tzomet was ensured several relatively high places in the combined list, partly as a reward for the withdrawal of Eitan as prime minister candidate, as the Likud feared that he would act as a spoiler for their candidate, Benjamin Netanyahu. The 1996 elections were the first Israeli elections to feature a double vote: one for the Knesset, and one direct vote for the prime minister. As part of the joint list, Tzomet managed to get all five of its Knesset members back into the Knesset. However, over the course of the next few years, Tzomet continued to splinter: Pini Badash left to run in municipal politics, Moshe Peled broke away to form his own Mekhora faction before joining Moledet while Eliezer Sandberg left to form the Centre Party. By the end of the 14th Knesset, Tzomet only had 2 MKs left: Eitan himself and Haim Dayan.

Following the dissolution of the Likud–Gesher–Tzomet alliance ahead of the 1999 elections, Tzomet was in the "political desert", it attempted to join the National Union joint list or rejoin an alliance with the Likud, however both ventures failed and Tzomet ran alone for the Knesset. Over the years Tzomet had lost almost all its support, and won just 4,128 votes, less than 10% of the number needed to cross the 1.5% electoral threshold. After the humiliating defeat, Eitan retired from political life.

== Moshe Gerin period (1999-2009); then dormant ==
Following the retirement of Eitan, the party faded into obscurity in the Israeli political scene.

Despite Rafael Eitan's departure, the party, now headed by Moshe Gerin, ran in the 2003, the 2006 elections, and the 2009 elections, but won only 2,023, 1,342, and 1,520 votes, respectively, in the three elections, not meeting the election threshold in any of them. Following their failure to reach the threshold in four successive elections, the party decided not to run in the 2013 and 2015 elections.

== New start: Oren Hazan (2019 elections) ==
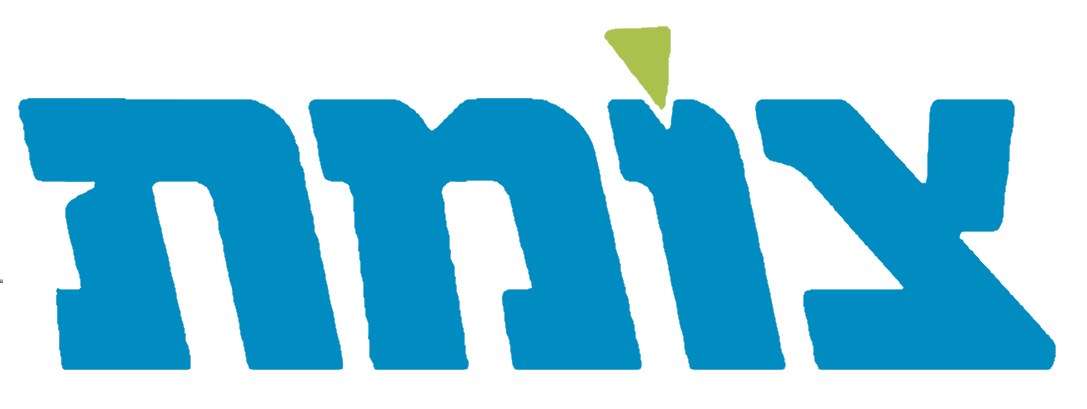
Alternative logo used during the leadership of Oren Hazan.

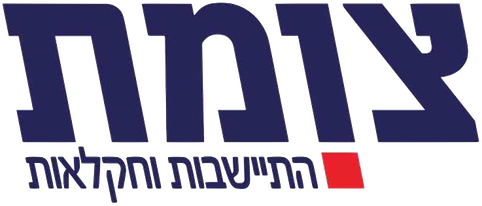
Logo of the Party during the September 2019 Election.

In the lead up to the April 2019 elections, Likud MK Oren Hazan failed to achieve a realistic spot in the Likud list, receiving only a small number of votes in the primaries. Following his failure in the Likud primaries, Hazan declared that he would leave the Likud and head his own party, taking over the long-dormant Tzomet party.

Hazan reformed the party, abandoning Eitan's secularism and statesmanlike conduct in favor of Hazan's own rightwing populist policy and rhetoric. Under Hazan, Tzomet received the best result since Eitan's departure, earning 2,417 votes. Despite Hazan's marginal success, this result was far from enough to reach the electoral threshold, and Hazan lost his Knesset seat.

== Gerin period (2019-) ==
Following Hazan's failure to revive the party, it returned to the hands of Moshe Gerin who brought the party back to its original form, focusing on agrarianism and settlement. The party received an even better result in the September 2019 elections, receiving 14,805 votes (0.33% of the popular vote).

== Ideology ==
=== Under Rafael Eitan (1983-1999) ===
Tzomet's ideology was heavily reflective of Raful Eitan himself. Eitan was a moshavnik; as such, he was influenced by the moshav movement's agricultural, nationalist, and secularist ideology. Raful's Tzomet's platform included:

- Separation of religion and state, and enforcing Haredi conscription.
- Annexation of the West Bank.
- Restricting voting rights only to those who have completed national service.
- Switching to a presidential system.
- Aggressive policy against Palestinian terrorism.
- Economic policy based on economic liberalism and agriculture.
- Encouraging more childbirth among Israeli Jews.
- Providing relief for Arabs to leave Israel.

While Tzomet supported Israeli settlements, it was never based out of them, like the more radical Moledet or Tehiya. The expanded Tzomet caucus in 1992 emphasised economic liberalism over security, which led to many members leaving to join Rabin's coalition.

=== Under Oren Hazan (2019 elections) ===
Under the leadership of Oren Hazan, Tzomet's ideology changed considerably. Tzomet no longer mentioned any changes to Israel's voting or government system. Hazan shifted Tzomet's focus away from secularism and recruitment of the Ultra Orthodox. Under Hazan, Tzomet focused primarily on criticizing Netanyahu's defense policy from the right and supporting more aggressive measures against terrorism and against the Israeli Arab members of the Knesset.

=== Under Moshe Gerin (2019-) ===
After Hazan left the party, and Moshe Gerin came back to lead it, Tzomet's ideology returned to its agrarianist base. The party's support dwindled 280 times in the fall-winter 2019.

== Leaders ==
Leader	Took office	Left office
Rafael Eitan	1983	1999
Moshe Gerin	1999	2009
Oren Hazan	2019	2019
Moshe Gerin	2019	Incumbent

== Election results ==
=== Knesset ===
Election	Leader	Votes	%	Seats	+/–	Status
1984	Rafael Eitan	with Tehiya		1 / 120	New	Opposition
1988	Rafael Eitan	45,489	2.0 (#10)	2 / 120	▲1	Coalition
1992	Rafael Eitan	166,366	6.4 (#4)	8 / 120	▲6	Opposition
1996	Rafael Eitan	with Likud and Gesher		5 / 120	▼3	Coalition
1999	Rafael Eitan	4,128	0.1	0 / 120	▼5	Extra-parliamentary
2003	Moshe Gerin	2,023	0.06	0 / 120	0	Extra-parliamentary
2006	Moshe Gerin	1,342	0.04	0 / 120	Steady	Extra-parliamentary
2009	Moshe Gerin	1,520	0.05	0 / 120	0	Extra-parliamentary
Apr 2019	Oren Hazan	2,417	0.06	0 / 120	0	Extra-parliamentary
Sep 2019	Moshe Gerin	14,627	0.33	0 / 120	0	Extra-parliamentary
2020	Moshe Gerin	Did not contest		0 / 120	0	Extra-parliamentary
2021	Moshe Gerin	663	0.02	0 / 120	0	Extra-parliamentary
2022	Moshe Gerin	377	0.01	0 / 120	0	Extra-parliamentary
2026	Moshe Gerin	with Beit Yisrael		0 / 120	0	Extra-parliamentary

== Knesset members ==
Year	Members	Total
1984	Rafael Eitan	1
1988	Rafael Eitan, Yoash Tzidon	2
1992	Rafael Eitan, Pini Badash, Alex Goldfarb, Haim Dayan, Eliezer Sandberg, Esther Salmovitz, Moshe Peled, Gonen Segev	8
1994	Rafael Eitan, Pini Badash, Haim Dayan, Eliezer Sandberg, Moshe Peled	5
1998	Rafael Eitan, Haim Dayan, Eliezer Sandberg, Moshe Peled	4
1999	Rafael Eitan, Haim Dayan	2
