= Moshe Peled (politician) =

Israeli politician (born 1945)

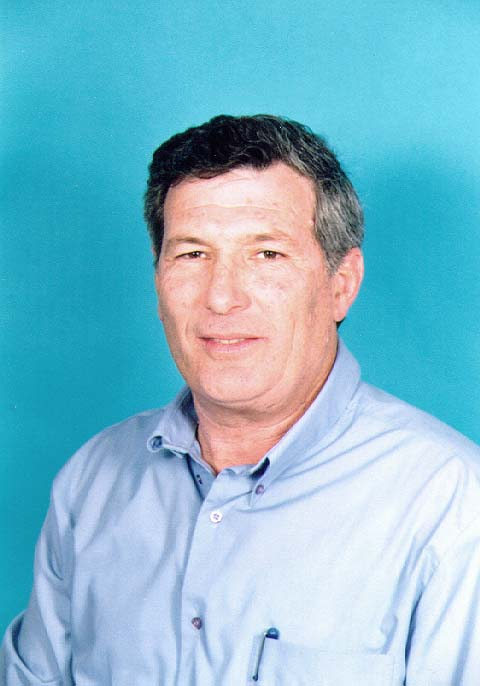
- Peled in the 1990s

Faction represented in the Knesset
- 1992–1999: Tzomet
- 1999: Mekhora
- 1999: Moledet

Personal details
- Born: 2 April 1945 (age 80) Beit HaShita, Mandatory Palestine

Moshe "Musa" Peled (Hebrew: משה פלד; born 2 April 1945) is an Israeli former politician who served as a member of the Knesset for Tzomet, Mekhora and Moledet between 1992 and 1999.

== Biography ==
Born in kibbutz Beit HaShita during the Mandate era, Peled did his national service in the Armoured Corps, attaining the rank of colonel. He became chairman of the Kibbutz Movement's defense committee and of the Northern Settlements Forum for the Defense of the Golan Heights.

A member of the Tzomet secretariat, he was elected to the Knesset on the party's list in the 1992 elections. He was re-elected on the joint Likud-Gesher-Tzomet list in the 1996 elections, and was appointed Deputy Minister of Education, Culture, and Sport. He left the position on 20 January 1998, but returned to the cabinet in the same role a week later. He resigned again on 2 November 1998.

On 4 March 1999 Peled left Tzomet and established his own faction, Mekhora. The new party immediately merged into Moledet. Moledet ran in the 1999 elections as part of the National Union alliance. Peled was placed eighth on its list, but lost his seat as the party won only four seats.
