= Yisrael Kessar =

Israeli politician (1931–2019)

- ישראל קיסר
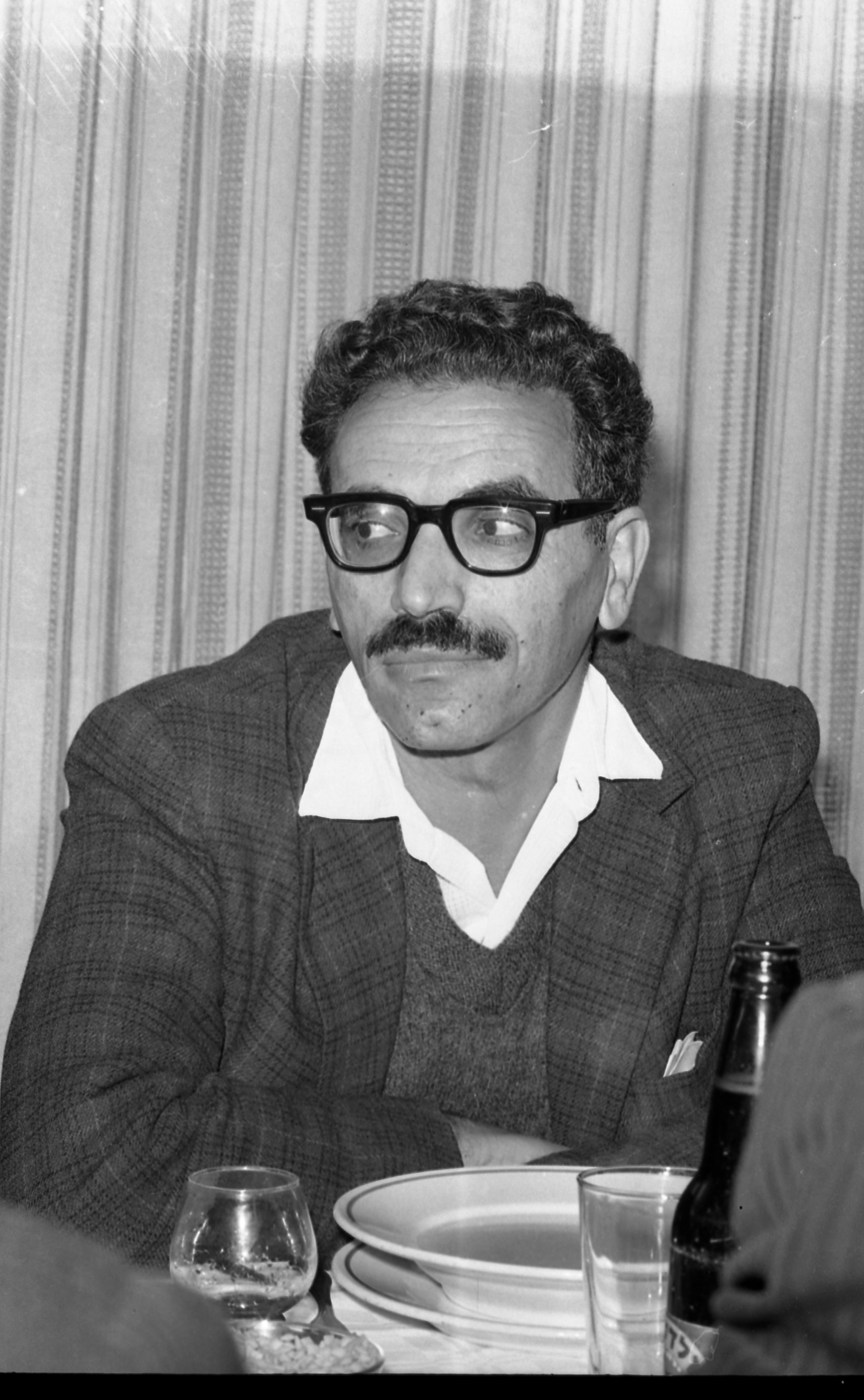

Ministerial roles
- 1992–1996: Minister of Transportation

Faction represented in the Knesset
- 1984-1991: Alignment
- 1991-1995: Labor Party

Personal details
- Born: 20 May 1931 Sana'a, Yemen
- Died: 8 September 2019 (aged 88) Holon, Israel

Yisrael Kessar (Hebrew: ישראל קיסר; 20 May 1931 – 8 September 2019) was an Israeli politician who served as a Knesset member for the Alignment and Labor Party between 1984 and 1996.

== Life and politics ==
Kessar was born in Sana'a, Yemen in 1931 and immigrated to Mandatory Palestine in 1933. He served in the IDF as a captain. He studied economy and sociology at the Hebrew University of Jerusalem and Tel Aviv University.

In 1966, he began his public career in the Histadrut, as treasurer (1973–1977), chairman of the Worker's Company (1977–1984) and secretary general (1984–1992). He was also chairman of the Division of the Professional Union and the Division of Youth, Sports, Manpower, and Students.

In 1984, he was elected to the Knesset for the Alignment. He was re-elected in 1988. He ran for the Labor Party leadership in 1992, losing to Yitzhak Rabin. After being re-elected to the Knesset in the 1992 Knesset elections, Rabin appointed him Minister of Transportation, a position he held until 1996. He was one of the early initiators of the Tel Aviv Light Rail. He lost his seat and ministerial post following the 1996 elections.

He died on 8 September 2019, aged 88, at the Wolfson Medical Center in Holon and was buried in his hometown, Rishon LeZion.
