= Tel Adashim =

Tel Adashim: תֵּל עֲדָשִׁים (Hebrew)
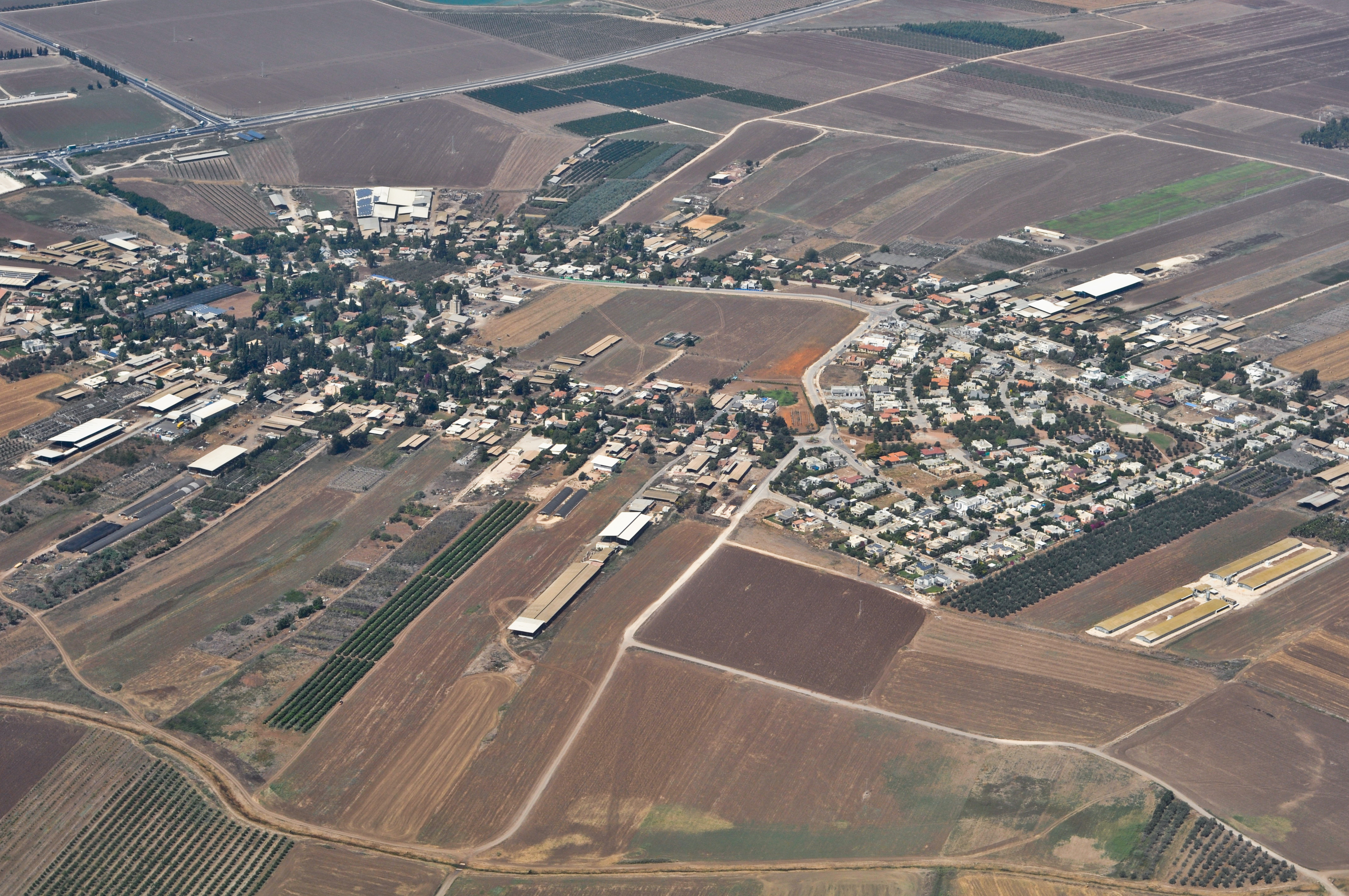
- Etymology: Lentils Hill
- Location within Jezreel Valley region of Israel Location within Israel
- Coordinates: 32°39′19″N 35°18′4″E
- Country: Israel
- District: Northern
- Subdistrict: Jezreel
- Council: Jezreel Valley
- Affiliation: Moshavim Movement
- Founded: 1923
- Founder: Hashomer Members
- Population (2024): 1,335

Tel Adashim (Hebrew: תֵּל עֲדָשִׁים, lit. 'Lentils Hill') is a moshav in northern Israel. Located between Nazareth and Afula, it falls under the jurisdiction of Jezreel Valley Regional Council. In 2024 it had a population of 1,335.

== History ==
=== Arab and Jewish villages ===
Jewish settlement began in the area in 1913 when Hashomer established Tel Adash, a settlement whose purpose was to protect the oil pipeline from Iraq to Haifa. By 1918, only two families remained.

In 1921 Zionist activists completed a purchase of 22,000 dunams at Tell el-Adas from the Sursuk family of Beirut. At that time, there were 150 Muslim families living there.

In the 1922 census of Palestine, conducted by the British Mandate authorities, Tal Adas had a population of 118; 98 Muslims, 16 Jews and 4 Christians.

=== 1923 moshav ===
In 1923, a moshav ovdim was established on the site and was named Tel Adashim.

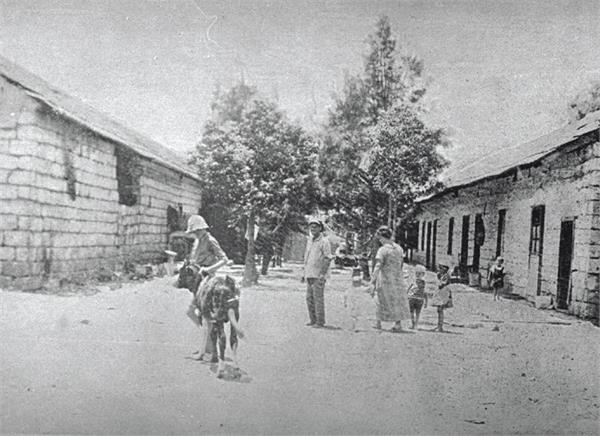
Tel Adashim 1924

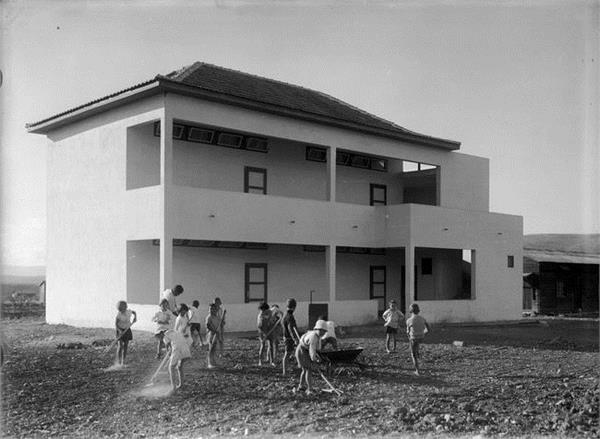
Tel Adashim 1930

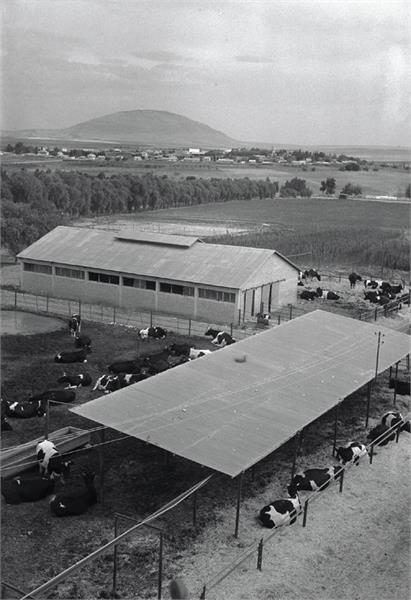
Tel Adashim from Mizra with Mount Tabor in background 1947

== Notable residents ==
Notable past and present residents include Rafael Eitan, Yigal Cohen, A. D. Gordon and Alexander Zaïd.
