= Micha Goldman =

Israeli politician (born 1948)

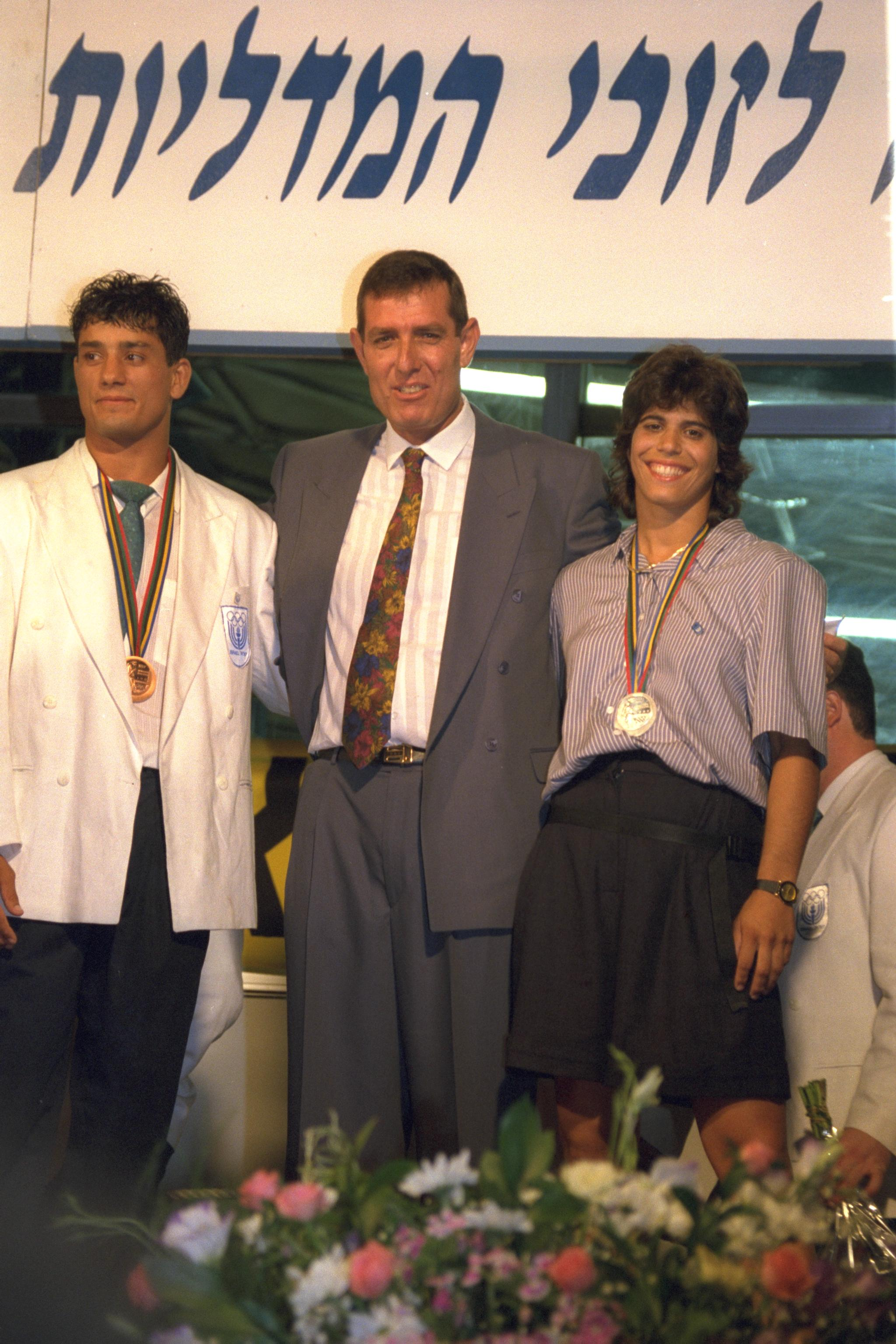
- Goldman in 2012

Faction represented in the Knesset
- 1988–1991: Alignment
- 1991–1999: Labor Party

Personal details
- Born: 10 October 1948 (age 77) Kfar Tavor, Israel

Micha Goldman (Hebrew: מיכה גולדמן; born 10 October 1948) is an Israeli former politician who served as a member of the Knesset for the Alignment and Labor Party between 1988 and 1999.

== Biography ==
Born in Kfar Tavor, Goldman studied municipal management at the University of Haifa, and worked in agriculture. He served as head of Kfar Tavor's local council, and on the board of trustees at the University of Haifa. He was also a member of the country's Olympic committee, the management board of the local government bank, and on the board of directors of Rafael Advanced Defense Systems between 1984 and 1988.

He was elected to the Knesset in the 1988 elections on the Alignment list (which merged into the Labor Party in 1991), and served as chair of the Sports Subcommittee. After being re-elected in 1992, he was appointed Deputy Minister of Education and Culture on 4 August that year. When Shimon Peres formed a new government in November 1995 (following the assassination of Yitzhak Rabin), Goldman remained Deputy Minister.

After re-election in 1996, he lost his portfolio (as Likud formed the government), but was appointed chairman of the Committee for the Examination of the Maccabiah Bridge Disaster and the Internal Affairs and Environment Committee.

After being placed thirty-first on the One Israel (an alliance of Labor, Gesher and Meimad) list for the 1999 elections, Goldman lost his seat as the party won only 26 seats.
