= Walid Haj Yahia =

Israeli Arab politician (1936-2015)

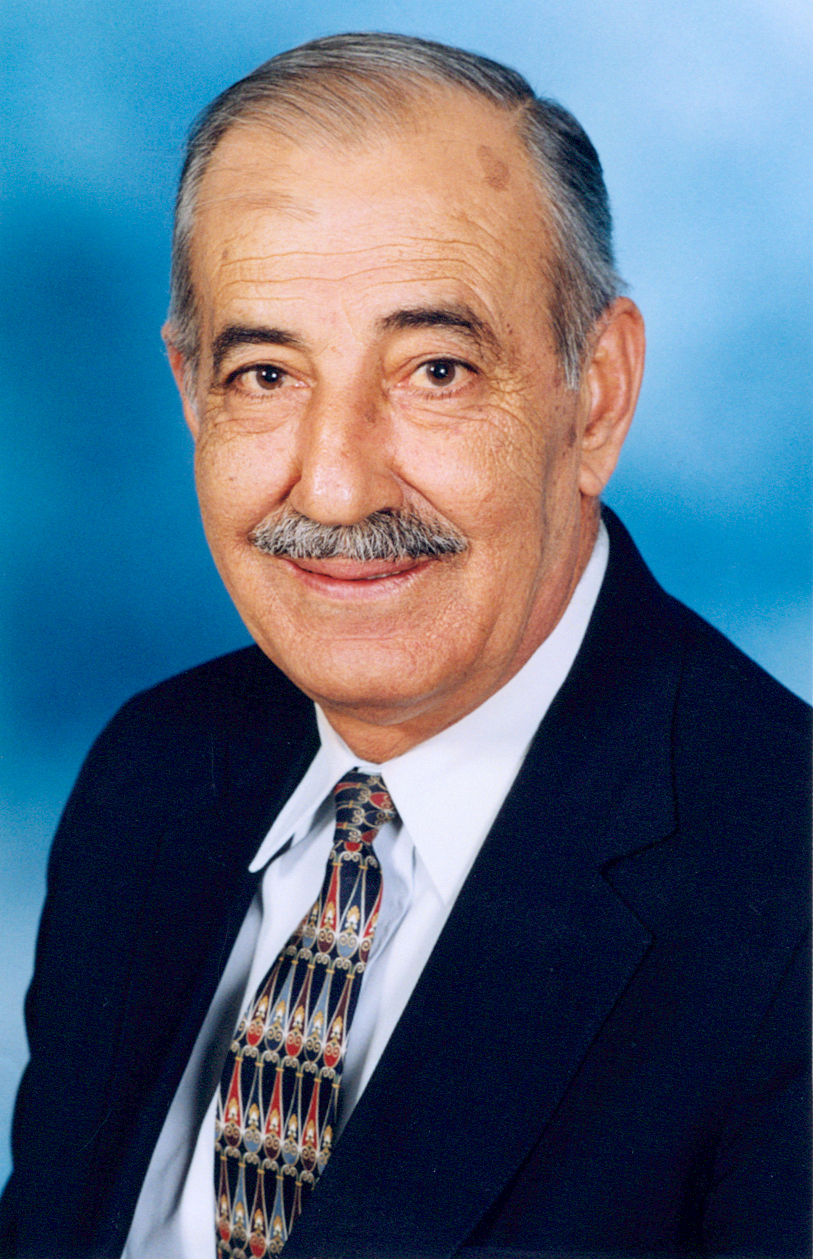

Faction represented in the Knesset
- 1981: Left Camp of Israel
- 1992–1999: Meretz

Personal details
- Born: 1936 Tayibe, Mandatory Palestine
- Died: 21 March 2015 (aged 78–79)

Walid Haj Yahia (Arabic: وليد حاج يحيى, Hebrew: וליד חאג'-יחיא; 1936 – 21 March 2015), also known as Walid Sadik, was an Israeli Arab politician who served as a member of the Knesset for the Left Camp of Israel and Meretz.

== Biography ==
Born in Tayibe during the Mandate era, Haj Yahia studied at the Hebrew University of Jerusalem, gaining a BA in sociology and political science. He first entered politics as a member of Mapam. He worked as headmaster of a high school in Tayibe for 23 years, and was a member of the Teachers' Union's central committee.

He left Mapam to found the Left Camp of Israel and was placed fifth on the party's list for the 1977 elections. The party won only two seats, but he entered the Knesset on 13 February 1981 as a replacement for Uri Avnery. He was second on the party's list for the elections in June that year, but the party failed to cross the electoral threshold.

He returned to Mapam following the demise of the Left Camp and was placed ninth on the Meretz list (an alliance of Mapam, Ratz and Shinui) for the 1992 elections, and returned to the Knesset as the alliance won twelve seats. On 4 August he was appointed deputy minister of agriculture and rural development in Yitzhak Rabin's government, a role he also held under Shimon Peres' brief tenure as prime minister after Rabin's assassination. He was re-elected in 1996, but lost his seat in the 1999 elections.
