= Yiud =

Yiud יעוד
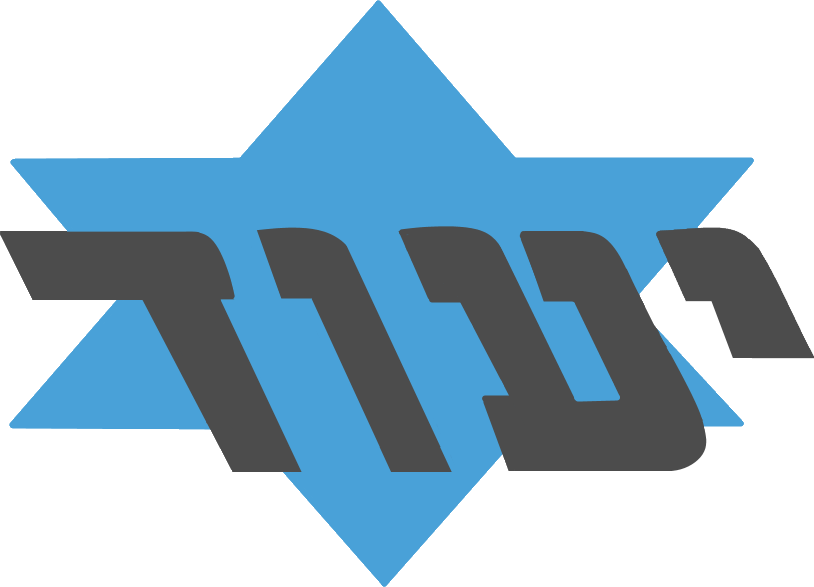
- Leader: Gonen Segev
- Founded: 7 February 1994
- Split from: Tzomet
- Most MKs: 3 (1992)

Yiud (Hebrew: יעוד, lit. 'Mission') was a small short-lived political faction in Israel in the mid-1990s.

== Background ==
The faction was formed on 7 February 1994 during the 13th Knesset when three MKs, Alex Goldfarb, Esther Salmovitz and Gonen Segev broke away from Tzomet, following a disagreement with the party's leader, Rafael Eitan. They joined Yitzhak Rabin's government, with Segev as Minister of Energy and Infrastructure, and Goldfarb as Deputy Minister of Housing and Construction.

On 27 November 1995 Goldfarb and Salmovitz later broke away to form Atid, leaving Segev as the faction's only member. Yiud did not compete in the 1996 elections and subsequently disappeared.
