= Masha Lubelsky =

Israeli politician (born 1936)

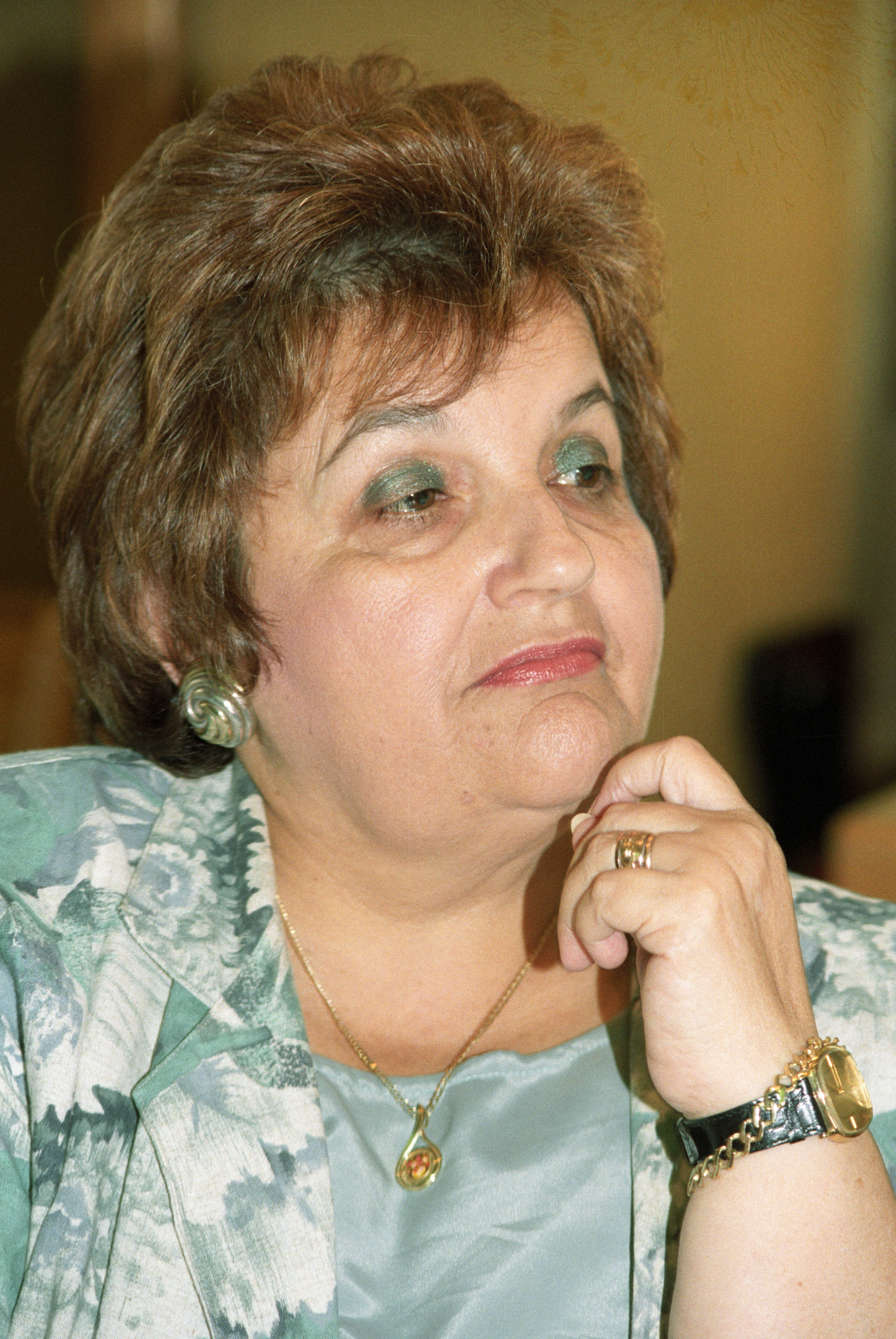
- Lubelsky in 1992

Faction represented in the Knesset
- 1992–1996: Labor Party

Personal details
- Born: 25 December 1936 (age 89) Herzliya, Mandatory Palestine

Masha Lubelsky (Hebrew: מאשה לובלסקי; born 25 December 1936) is an Israeli former politician who served as a member of the Knesset for the Labor Party between 1992 and 1996.

== Biography ==
Born in Herzliya during the Mandate era, Lubelsky worked in education. She served as secretary general of Na'amat from 1981 until 1992 and was a member of the Histadrut central committee.

A member of the Labor Party, she was elected to the Knesset on its list in 1992 and was appointed Deputy Minister of Industry and Trade. She lost her seat in the 1996 elections. In 1999 she joined Pnina Rosenblum's Tnufa party and was third on its list for the elections that year. However, it failed to cross the electoral threshold.
