= Eli Dayan =

Israeli former politician (born 1949)

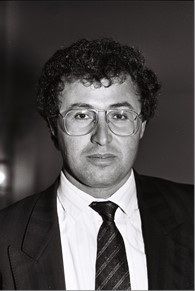
- Dayan in 1988

Faction represented in the Knesset
- 1988–1991: Alignment
- 1991–1996: Labor Party

Personal details
- Born: 25 October 1949 (age 77) El Kelaa des Sraghna, Morocco

Eli Dayan (Hebrew: אלי דיין; born 25 October 1949) is an Israeli former politician who served as a member of the Knesset for the Alignment and Labor Party between 1988 and 1996, and as Deputy Minister of Foreign Affairs from 1995 until 1996.

== Biography ==
Born in El Kelaa des Sraghna, Morocco in 1949, Dayan emigrated to Israel in 1963. He studied law at the Hebrew University of Jerusalem, gaining an LLB.

He became mayor of Ashkelon in 1978, a role he held until 1991. He joined the new Tami party in 1981, and was fourth on the party's list for the 1981 Knesset elections, but the party won only three seats. He was third on the list for the 1984 elections, but again failed to win a seat. After Tami merged into Likud, Dayan joined the Labor Party, and in 1988 he was elected to the Knesset on the Alignment list (of which the Labor Party was the major component). He was re-elected in 1992, and was appointed Deputy Minister of Foreign Affairs Minister on 24 July 1995, replacing Yossi Beilin. He held the position until losing his seat in the 1996 elections.
