= Rafael Eitan =

Israeli general and politician

- רפאל איתן
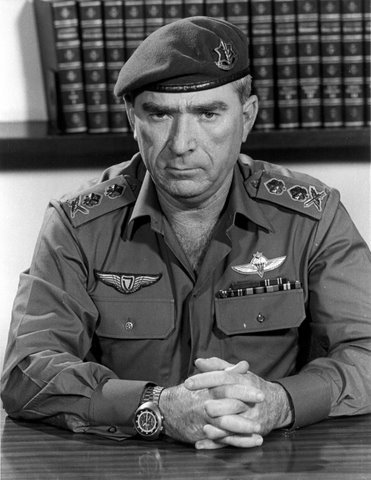
- Rafael Eitan

Ministerial roles
- 1990–1991: Minister of Agriculture
- 1996–1999: Deputy Prime Minister
- 1996–1999: Minister of Agriculture
- 1996–1999: Minister of the Environment

Faction represented in the Knesset
- 1984–1987: Tehiya
- 1987: Independent
- 1987–1999: Tzomet

Personal details
- Born: 11 January 1929 Tel Adashim, Mandatory Palestine
- Died: 23 November 2004 (aged 75) Ashdod, Israel
- Awards: Medal of Courage; Legion of Merit
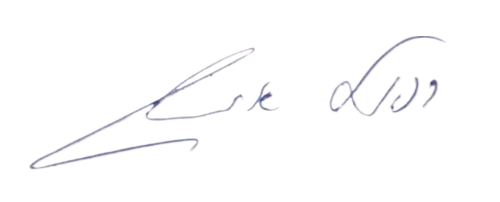
- Signature
- Nickname: Raful

Military service
- Allegiance: Israel
- Branch/service: Haganah; Israel Defense Forces
- Years of service: 1948–1983
- Rank: Rav Aluf (Chief of Staff; highest rank)
- Commands: Paratroopers Brigade; 36th Division; Northern Command; Operations Directorate; Deputy Chief of Staff; Chief of Staff
- Battles/wars: 1948 Arab–Israeli War; Suez Crisis; Six Day War; 1968 Israeli raid on Lebanon; War of Attrition; Yom Kippur War; 1982 Lebanon War

Rafael "Raful" Eitan (Hebrew: רפאל "רפול" איתן; 11 January 1929 – 23 November 2004) was an Israeli general, former Chief of Staff of the Israel Defense Forces (Ramatkal) and later a politician, a Knesset member, and government minister.

== Early life ==
Rafael Eitan was born Rafael Kaminsky in the moshav of Tel Adashim near Nazareth in 1929, to Eliyahu and Miriam (née Orlov) Kaminsky, Ukrainian Jewish immigrants to Palestine. His father was one of the founders of the Jewish defense organization Hashomer. Rafael grew up in the community of Tel Adashim and lived there for most of his life. Zvi Nishri (Orloff), a pioneer in modern physical education in Israel, was his uncle. Late in life he reportedly said that he was descended from a Subbotnik family that had served as guards to the tsar. According to Nahum Barnea, a genealogical search indicated that he had Jewish parentage on both sides.

His father gave Rafael and his brothers and sisters a strict education. Rafael later married Miriam, with whom he had five children. They ultimately divorced and he married Ofra Meirson.

== Military career ==
=== Early battles ===
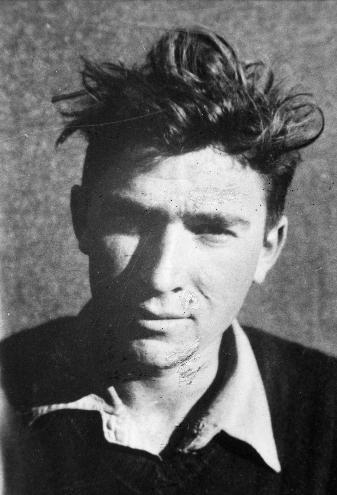
Eitan as a commander in the Harel Brigade, 1948

Eitan was a junior officer in the Palmach, the Haganah's elite strike force, and took part in the 1948 Arab–Israeli War. He fought in Jerusalem and received a head wound in the battle for the San Simon Monastery in April 1948. Later he served with the 10th Infantry Battalion in the Lachish-Negev region.

In 1954, Captain Eitan became commander of a Paratroops company in Unit 101. During Operation Olive Leaves in 1955 he received a machine gun wound to his chest, while participating in a military raid into Syria. For this action he was decorated with the Medal of Courage.

In the 1956 Suez Crisis, Major Eitan was the commander of the 890 Paratroopers battalion and participated in the 29 October parachute attack on the Mitla Pass.

During the Six-Day War in early June 1967, as a Colonel he commanded the Paratroopers Brigade on the Gaza front. He received a severe head wound in combat while approaching the Suez Canal.

On the evening of 28 December 1968, he commanded the commando raid on Beirut airport. According to a legend which circulated among Israeli special forces soldiers, at one point during the raid, he entered the airport terminal, and finding it in a state of disorder with no security guards present, walked to a coffee shop, ordered a coffee, and paid for it in Israeli currency before leaving.

In 1969 he was appointed head of infantry forces and later served as a division commander. As the commander of the 36th Division, Brigadier General Eitan stopped the Syrian attack into the Golan Heights during the October 1973 Yom Kippur War. After the war, he was appointed to commander of the northern command and promoted to the rank of Major General.

=== Chief of Staff ===
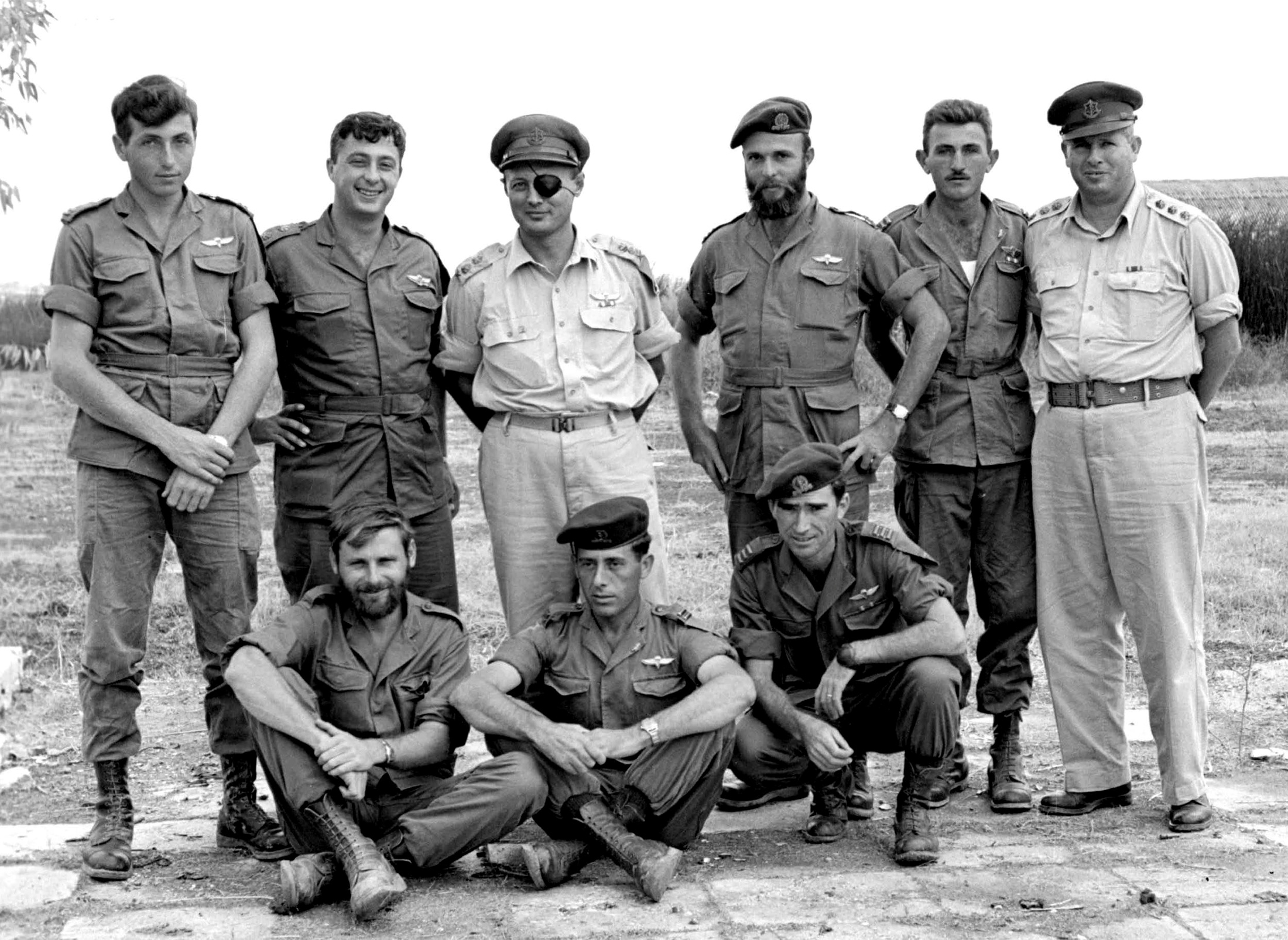
Raful Eitan (squatting, right) with members of 890th Paratroop Battalion after Operation Egged (November 1955). Standing l to r: Lt. Meir Har-Zion, Maj. Ariel Sharon, Lt. Gen Moshe Dayan, Capt. Dani Matt, Lt. Moshe Efron, Maj. Gen Asaf Simchoni; On ground, l to r: Capt. Aharon Davidi, Lt. Ya'akov Ya'akov, Capt. Rafael Eitan.

On 1 April 1978, Eitan was promoted to the rank of Lieutenant General and was appointed by Ezer Weizman to be the Chief of Staff of the Israel Defense Forces.

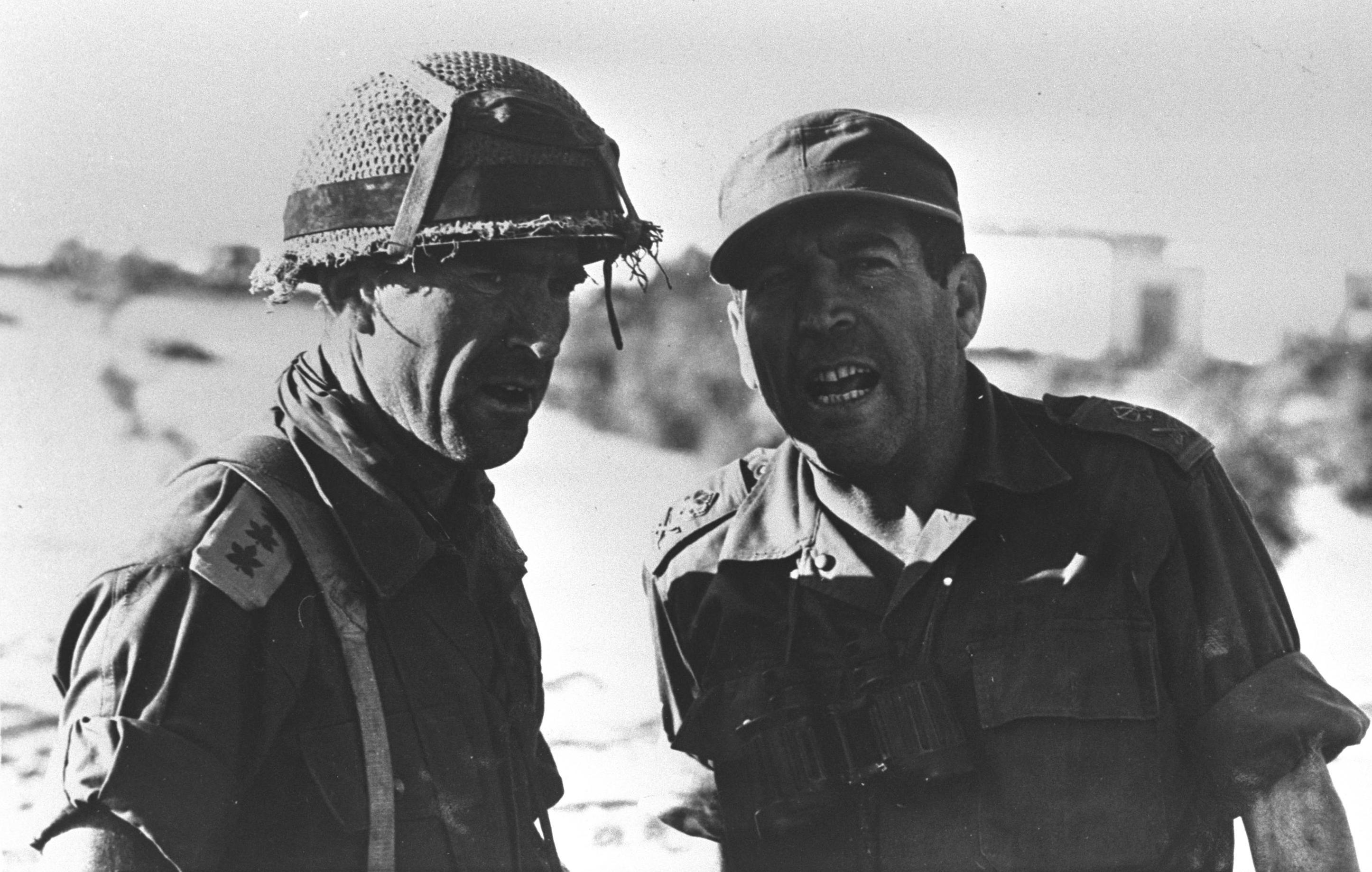
Eitan, left, with General Israel Tal during the Six-Day War

Eitan opened his term with symbolic steps to increase discipline and efficiency in the IDF. He required soldiers to wear the military beret and to collect spent cartridges after rifle range practice.

Eitan oversaw the redeployment of the IDF outside of the Sinai Peninsula after the peninsula was handed back to Egypt. He and Sharon demolished the Israeli town of Yamit in Sinai in April 1982 after the Egyptians refused to pay for its infrastructure.

As chief of staff, Eitan initiated a project that was known as "Raful Youth" (Na'arei Raful), in which young persons from low socio-economic background were integrated into the IDF and were trained for professions that allowed them to come out of poverty and avoid getting involved in crime. The IDF also helped those youth to complete their high school studies.

He was chief of staff at the time of the Israeli air attack on Iraq's Osirak nuclear reactor complex on 7 June 1981.

In April 1982 he initiated a new policy in the Occupied Territories which in Israeli army slang became known by the Hebrew word tertur. One document from his office stated:

1. It is necessary to act with force against agitators and to imprison them at every opportunity.
2. . . . When it is necessary, use legal measures which enable imprisonment for interrogation for a period stated in the law, and release them for one or two days and then re-imprison them.

After the trial of seven members of the Israeli army in December 1982, an Israeli operations officer was quoted as described tertur: "In addition to this business where you work to discover the provocateurs, you tertur the population. Population tertur does not mean that you punish those who did something, but you simply round up everyone, just like that."

=== Lebanon War ===
Eitan (center) with two officers, Amnon Eshkol and Mordechai Yerushalmi, in Lebanon, 1983

In 1981 it became public knowledge the Israel was arming and forming an alliance with the Lebanese Phalangist militia. In May it was revealed that Eitan had recently visited Jounieh several times and met with the militia leadership. The previous month, at a meeting in Damascus, the Lebanese government had come to an agreement with UNIFIL to deploy Lebanese Army soldiers into the areas that the UN forces were stationed in Southern Lebanon. This was followed by an increase of IDF activity in Lebanon which culminated in a crisis over the positioning Syrian antiaircraft missiles. Operations included a nighttime commando raid on five Palestinian targets in Southern Lebanon, 9–10 April; the shooting down of two Syrian Army helicopters in the Beqaa valley, 28 April; a commando raid near Damour in which four Libyan and two Syrian soldiers were killed, 27 May.

On 3 June 1982, Abu Nidal's militant group gravely wounded Israel's ambassador in London, Shlomo Argov, in an assassination attempt. In response, the Israeli Air Force bombed Palestinian refugee camps in Lebanon. The Palestinian militants shelled Israel's northern settlements in retaliation and resulted in the Israeli government's 4 June order to begin the 1982 Lebanon War. The operation was launched on 6 June and soon became a full-scale invasion. The Israeli plan was to drive the PLO away from the Israeli border and help Bachir Gemayel's Phalangist militia take control of south Lebanon. During the war, the IDF faced the Syrian military, Palestinian militants and various militias. The IDF engaged in urban warfare and shelled Beirut to hit PLO headquarters.

The IDF achieved some impressive military results – such as wiping out the entire Syrian air defense system in the first days of the war, under the command of IAF Major general David Ivri. But it also had some failures, such as the Battle of Sultan Yacoub.

The operation was designed to be limited – both in time and area – but the IDF advanced far beyond the planned "40 kilometers" under the command of Defense Minister Ariel Sharon. The mounting Israeli casualties in Lebanon, combined with the Sabra and Shatila massacre, resulted in mass protests by the Israeli public against the war – which resulted in a cease-fire agreements and the establishment of the Kahan Commission to investigate the massacre.

==== Kahan Commission ====
In concluding that Eitan was "in breach of duty that was incumbent on the Chief of Staff" the Commission focused on two points:

Firstly, that he did not take into consideration the "danger of acts of vengeance and bloodshed" when he, with the Minister of Defence, decided to send the Phalangist militia into the refugee camps. The commission argued that it was "common knowledge ... that there was a possibility of harm to the population in the camps at the hands of the Phalangists", particularly in the aftermath of the assassination of their leader, the newly elected President of Lebanon, Bashir Gemayel.

Secondly they found that he was in dereliction of duty for not following up reports of acts of killings which had become known within hours of the Phalangist entry into Shatila camp. They record that he had a meeting with the Phalangist leaders on the following day in Beirut and did not raise the issue. At this meeting he expressed satisfaction with the Phalangist operation and agreed to provide further support.

In its recommendations the commission noted that Eitan was due to retire in April 1983 and therefore resolved "that it is sufficient to determine responsibility without making any further recommendation."

In a book co-authored by Ze'ev Schiff, military correspondent of Ha'aretz, and Ehud Ya'ari, Middle East Affairs correspondent for Israeli television, published a year after the Kahan Report, new information came to light, that suggested that Eitan was aware of the feelings of the Phalangists before he and Sharon decided to send the militia into the refugee camps.

During a minuted meeting at the Defense Minister's office at 5 pm on Thursday 16 September 1982 between US diplomats including Morris Draper and Sharon, Eitan, Saguy, and two other senior Defense Ministry staff, Draper was informed of the Israeli plan to send the Phalangists into the camps. A heated exchange followed, centering on which Lebanese force was to enter the camps. Draper insisted that it should be the regular Lebanese army. At this point Eitan broke into the discussion:

They're not up to it. Let me explain to you. Lebanon is at a point of exploding into a frenzy of revenge. No one can stop them. Yesterday we spoke with the Phalange about their plans. They don't have a strong command.... They're obsessed with the idea of revenge. You have to know the Arabs well to sense something like that. If Amin tells the Phalangists to wreak their vengeance, he'll legitimize what's going to happen. I'm telling you that some of their commanders visited me, and I could see in their eyes that it's going to be a relentless slaughter. A number of incidents already happened today, and it's a good thing we were there, rather than the Lebanese army, to prevent it from going further.

Schiff and Ya'ari continue: "To hear Eitan tell it, the IDF was the last obstacle to a bloodthirsty rampage by the Phalange. Of course, he neglected to state that the Phalange forces were waiting outside Shatila at that very moment, because he, among others, had encouraged them to fight in the camps".

== Political career ==
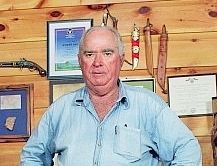
Eitan in 2002

After his retirement from the army in April 1983, Eitan entered politics. He had the image of the sabra Israeli who connected to his roots and to the land. His background in agriculture and hobbies such as wood work and flight contributed to this image, which attracted many in the Israeli public.

Eitan was considered to be a conservative advocating tough policies towards the Palestinians. On 12 April 1983 Eitan said in a Knesset committee meeting: "The Arabs will never defeat us by throwing stones. Our answer will be a nationalist Zionist solution. For every stone throwing – we'll establish ten settlements. If there will be – and there will be – a hundred settlements between Nablus and Jerusalem, no stones will be thrown." On another occasion, in an address to the Knesset, he remarked "When we have settled the land, all the Arabs will be able to do about it will be to scurry around like drugged cockroaches in a bottle".

Eitan initially formed the Tzomet party in 1983, which ran with the Tehiya party and was first elected to the Knesset in 1984, with the parties merging in 1986. In 1987, he revived Tzomet as an ultranationalist party which had conservative views on defense and foreign policy but a liberal and secular domestic platform. He was elected to the 11th Knesset and served as Minister of Agriculture between 1988 and 1991, when Tzomet left the government. In the 1992 elections, Tzomet achieved a record of eight seats, but Eitan refused to join Yitzhak Rabin's coalition.

Eitan was a supporter of the Israeli alliance with Apartheid-era South Africa. Eitan has been accused of expressing racist sentiments towards Arabs. Blacks in South Africa, he claimed, "want to gain control over the white minority just like the Arabs here want to gain control over us. And we, like the white minority in South Africa, must act to prevent them from taking over".

Eitan had troubles in controlling his party, resulting in some Knesset members splitting from Tzomet to join other parties. When Rabin presented the Oslo II Accords to the Knesset, it managed to pass only with the support of Alex Goldfarb and Gonen Segev – two Tzomet members who were promised ministries by Rabin in return for their support.

On 1996, Tzomet joined an alliance of Likud and Gesher headed by Benjamin Netanyahu. Although the triumvirate lost the Knesset election to Labour, Netanyahu won the election for Prime Minister, allowing him to form the government. Eitan was promised the ministry of internal security, but a criminal investigation against him blocked his nomination. The investigation eventually cleared Eitan and the case was closed on 1998 due to "lack of evidence". In the meantime, Eitan served as Agriculture and Environment Minister and also as a Deputy Prime Minister (1998–99).

In 1999 Tzomet failed to win any Knesset seats and Eitan retired from politics.

== Death ==
On 23 November 2004, Eitan arrived at the Mediterranean sea port of Ashdod, where he was overseeing a port expansion project. A large wave swept him from a breakwater into the sea and he drowned. He was lost in rough waters for over an hour before his body was recovered by the Israeli Navy. He was pronounced dead after efforts to revive him failed.

== Awards and decorations ==

War of Independence Ribbon	Operation Kadesh Ribbon	Six-Day War Ribbon	War of Attrition Ribbon	Yom Kippur War Ribbon	First Lebanon War Ribbon	Medal of Courage	Commander of the Legion of Merit

== Bibliography ==
- A Soldier's Story: The Life and Times of an Israeli War Hero by Raful Eitan (ISBN 1-56171-016-4)

== See also ==
- List of Israel's Chiefs of the General Staff

Legal offices
Preceded by Ovadia Eli	Chairman of the Committee on Drug Abuse; 1992–1996	Succeeded by Eli Ben-Menachem
