= Gonen Segev =

Israeli politician and Iranian spy

- גונן שגב
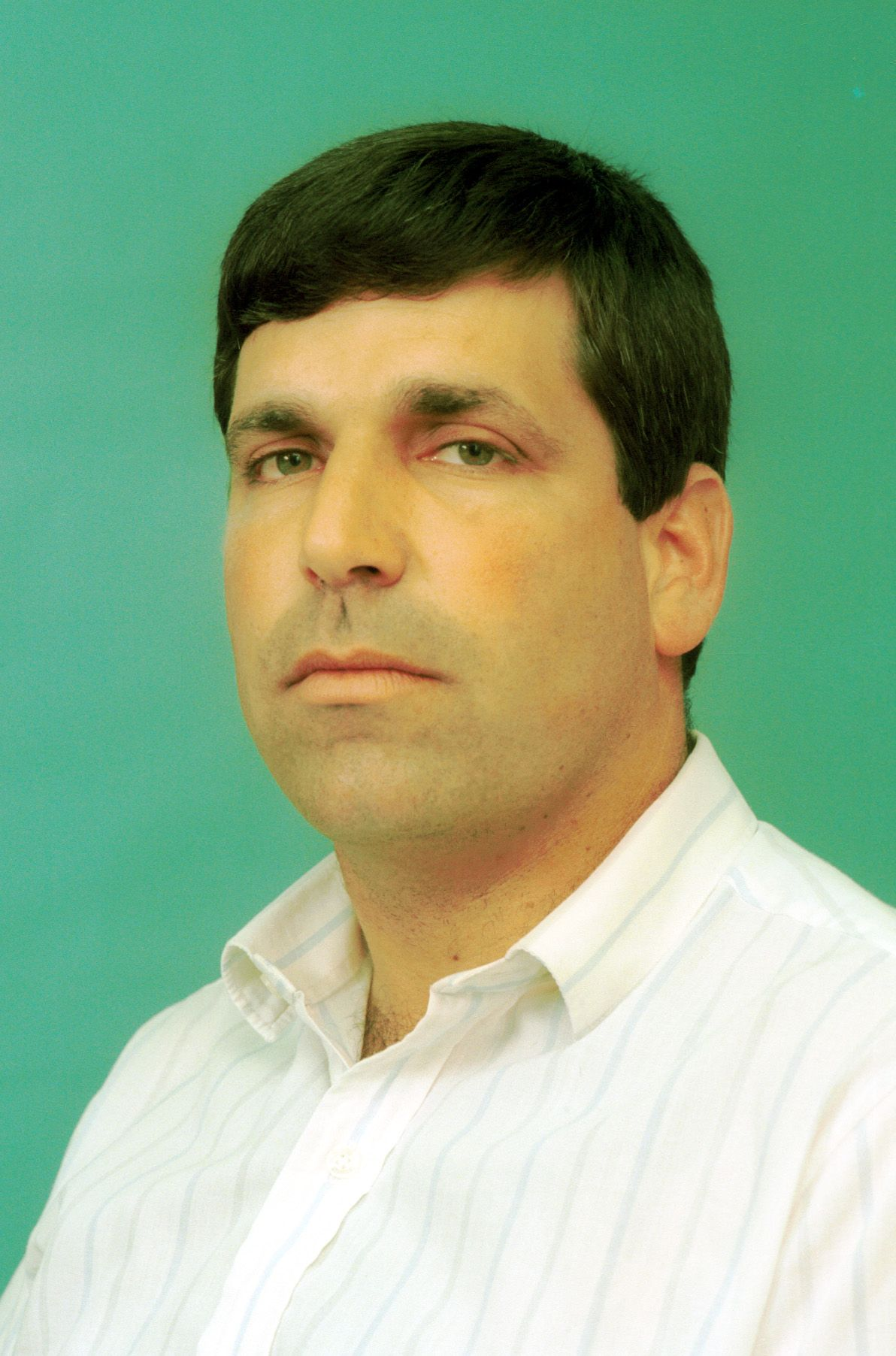

Ministerial roles
- 1995–1996: Minister of Energy & Infrastructure

Faction represented in the Knesset
- 1992–1994: Tzomet
- 1994–1996: Yiud

Personal details
- Born: 6 January 1956 (age 70) Kiryat Motzkin, Israel

Gonen Segev (Hebrew: גונן שגב; born 6 January 1956) is a former Minister of Energy & Infrastructure of Israel, member of Knesset, and pediatrician. In 2005 he was convicted of forgery, credit card fraud and attempting to smuggle drugs. In 2019 he was convicted of spying for Iran and was sentenced to 11 years in prison.

== Early life ==
Segev was born and raised in Kiryat Motzkin and studied at ORT Kiryat Motzkin high school. He began his mandatory military service in the Israel Defense Forces by attending the Israeli Air Force pilot course, but dropped out and moved to the Alpinist Unit, where he made it to the rank of captain. He studied medicine at Ben-Gurion University of the Negev and graduated with an M.D. He worked as a private doctor and as a farmer in Tel Adashim.

== Political career ==
In the early 1990s, Segev was active in the Tzomet party founded by Rafael Eitan. In 1992 he was elected to the 13th Knesset, after Tzomet had won eight seats. At age 35, he was one of the youngest people elected to the Knesset. As the Labor Party was the largest party in these elections it formed the government and the right-wing Tzomet party remained in the opposition. Segev served as an opposition MK and a member of the Knesset's Finance Committee.

On 7 February 1994 Tzomet MKs Segev, Esther Salmovitz, and Alex Goldfarb split from their party to form the Yiud faction. On 9 January 1995 Segev became Minister of Energy and Infrastructure after Yiud joined Yitzhak Rabin's government. Segev held the same minister post again from 22 November 1995 to 18 June 1996 in the government that Shimon Peres formed shortly after Yitzhak Rabin was assassinated. His vote was vital in passing the Oslo Accords in the Knesset.

== Business and crime ==
After his political career Segev focused on a business career. In April 2004 Segev was arrested for attempting to smuggle thousands of ecstasy tablets from Amsterdam to Israel that he claimed he thought were M&M's. He illegally extended his diplomatic passport with a pencil to avoid being searched by Dutch airport authorities. He had also pulled money from an automated teller machine in Hong Kong, after claiming that his card was stolen. A security camera had captured footage of him at the machine. He was convicted in a plea bargain for forgery and attempted drug smuggling and sentenced to five years imprisonment. In August 2006 an Israeli court rejected his appeal for shortening his prison term. In March 2007 his medical license was revoked. He appealed to have his license reinstated to the Jerusalem District Court, but the appeal was denied. He was released from prison in 2007 after the parole board decided to reduce his jail time by a third due to good behavior.

Prohibited from practicing medicine in Israel, Segev moved to Nigeria to work as a doctor. Segev was a physician for Israeli diplomatic staff in Abuja and members of the local Jewish community, and received a letter of praise from the Israeli Foreign Ministry for saving an Israeli security guard's life. In 2016, he requested that the Israeli Health Ministry reinstate his medical license so he could resume his medical career in Israel. The request was denied. In an interview with Israeli media, he stated "I’ve decided I’m not coming back to Israel unless I can return with my head held high as ‘Dr. Gonen Segev’ with a permit to work... not as ‘the former convict Gonen Segev."

=== Espionage ===
In June 2018, the Shin Bet and Israel police announced that he had been arrested under suspicion of spying for Iranian intelligence. According to Israeli intelligence, Segev was recruited in Nigeria by Iranian Embassy officials in 2012, initially being lured to the Iranian Embassy on the pretext of treating children of diplomatic staff. He traveled twice to Iran to meet his handlers, and met with Iranian agents in apartments and hotels around the world. He received secret communications equipment for encoding messages between him and his handlers. He maintained contacts with Israelis involved in defense and foreign relations, and worked to put Israeli officials in contact with Iranian intelligence operatives while passing them off as innocuous businessmen. He was identified as a spy by Shin Bet's counterintelligence department.

In May 2018, Segev was refused admission to Equatorial Guinea due to his criminal record and subsequently extradited to Israel, where he was interrogated and indicted for espionage, aiding the enemy in a time of war, and providing information to the enemy. According to Israeli authorities, Segev did not deny his contacts with Iranian officials, but claimed that he was acting as a double agent in the hopes of restoring his tarnished reputation and returning to Israel as a hero.

Segev's trial opened in the Jerusalem District Court on 5 July 2018. The trial was closed to the public.

In August 2018, Mahmoud Alavi, Iran's intelligence minister told press "you have recently heard that we brought under our control a member of a cabinet of a powerful country." According to Times of Israel, his remarks were interpreted as acknowledging that Segev worked for Iran, despite the fact he did not name Segev nor clarified about the country.

On 9 January 2019, Segev pleaded guilty to charges of espionage for repeatedly meeting with Iranian intelligence officials and supplying them with information. As part of a plea deal negotiated with prosecutors, the more serious charges of aiding an enemy during war time were dropped and he would be sentenced to 11 years in prison. He was formally sentenced on 26 February.

== See also ==
- List of Israeli public officials convicted of crimes or misdemeanors
