= Alex Goldfarb (politician) =

Israeli politician (born 1947)

- אלכס גולדפרב
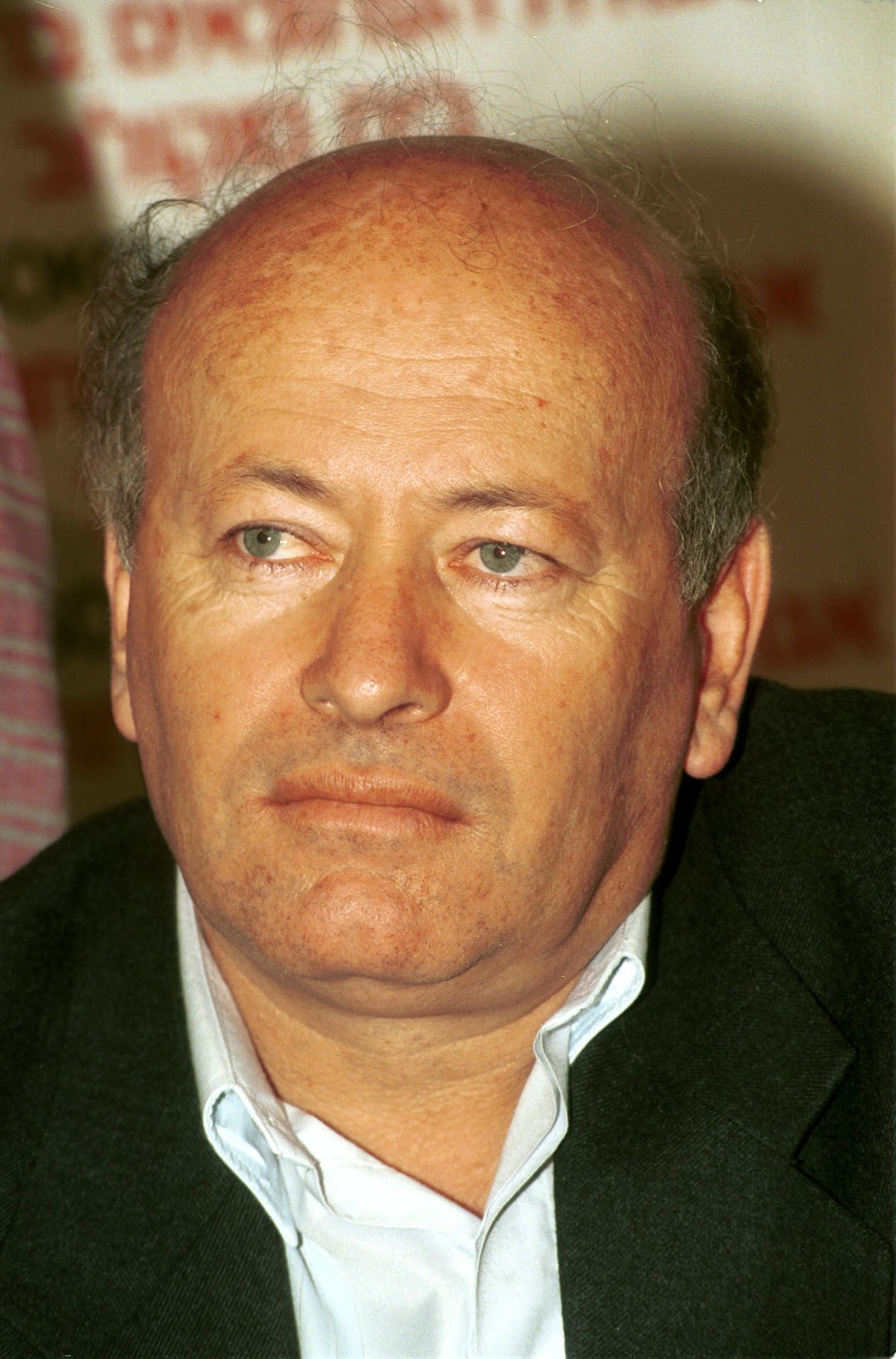

Faction represented in the Knesset
- 1992–1994: Tzomet
- 1992–1995: Yiud
- 1995–1996: Atid

Personal details
- Born: 1 June 1947 (age 78) Seini, Romania

Alex Goldfarb (Hebrew: אלכס גולדפרב; born 1 June 1947) is a former Israeli politician.

== Early life ==
Alexander Goldfarb was born in Seini, Romania, and emigrated to Israel in 1963. After his military service he worked as an independent building contractor and a certified electrician. Later he worked for the Israel Electric Corporation and became active in the workers union. Alongside his employment he studied business management at the Israeli College of Management.

== Political career ==
In 1992, Goldfarb ran in the Israeli legislative elections on the Tzomet party list. In February 1994, he left the party along with Esther Salmovitz and Gonen Segev to establish Yiud. The new party joined the administration of Yitzhak Rabin and Goldfarb was appointed Deputy Minister of Housing and Construction. When Rabin's government needed his support in order to approve the second Oslo agreements, which were brought to the government for ratification. Goldfarb promised the necessary majority but only after he was promised a Mitsubishi and a driver, The outcome of the vote was 61 to 59.

On 27 November 1995, Goldfarb and Salmovitz left Yiud to establish Atid. The party did not run in the 1996 elections and Goldfarb lost his seat. He later joined the Labor Party and was later appointed to a position linked to the security industry by then-Minister of Defense, Binyamin Ben-Eliezer.

After the Knesset and government, Goldfarb established a private company. He considered a run for Mayor of Ashkelon in 2007. In 2009 he ran for Mayor of nearby Beer Tuvia but lost to Mayor Dror Shor who was reelected.
