= 1996 Israeli general election =

- 29 May 1996
- Prime ministerial election
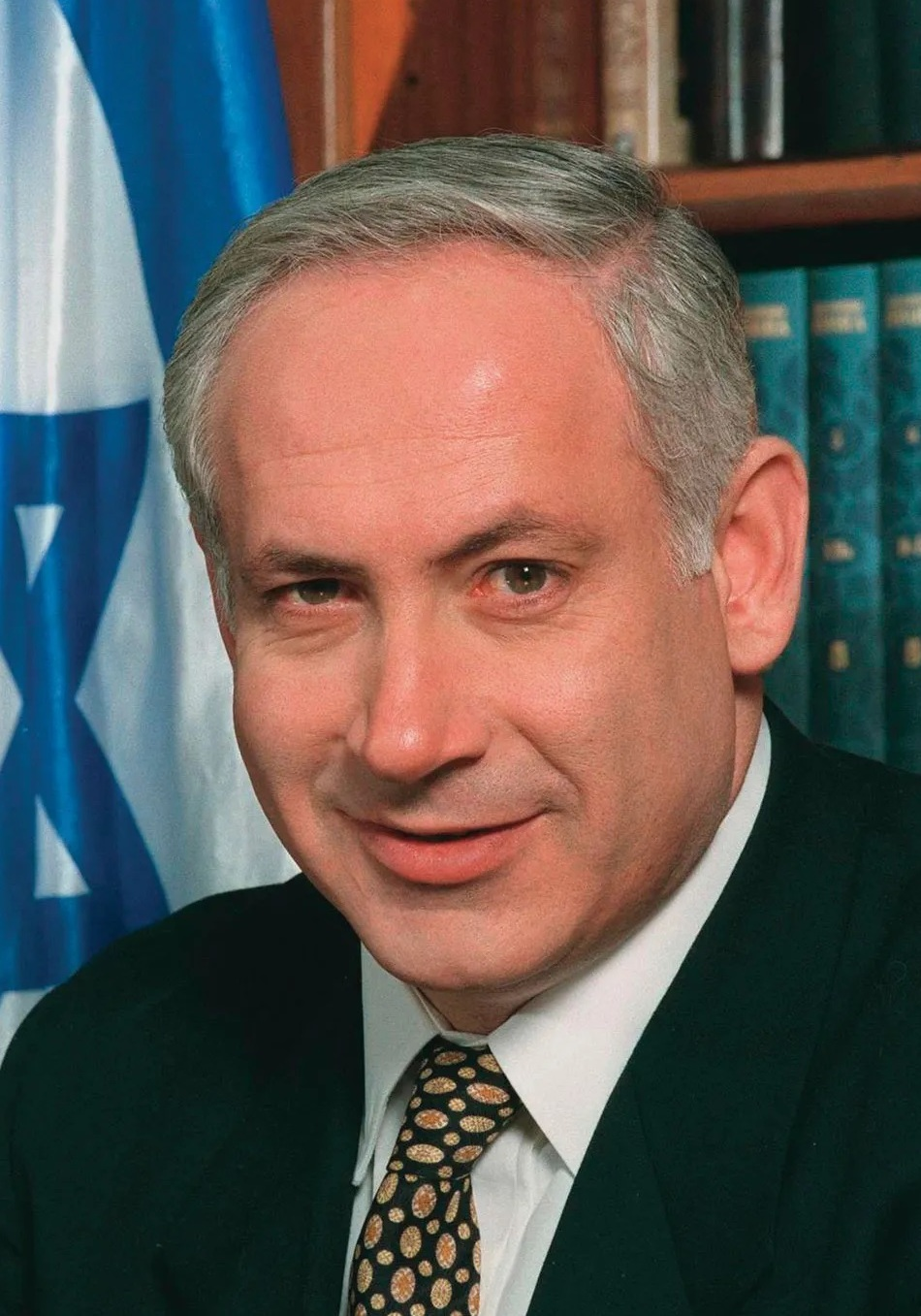

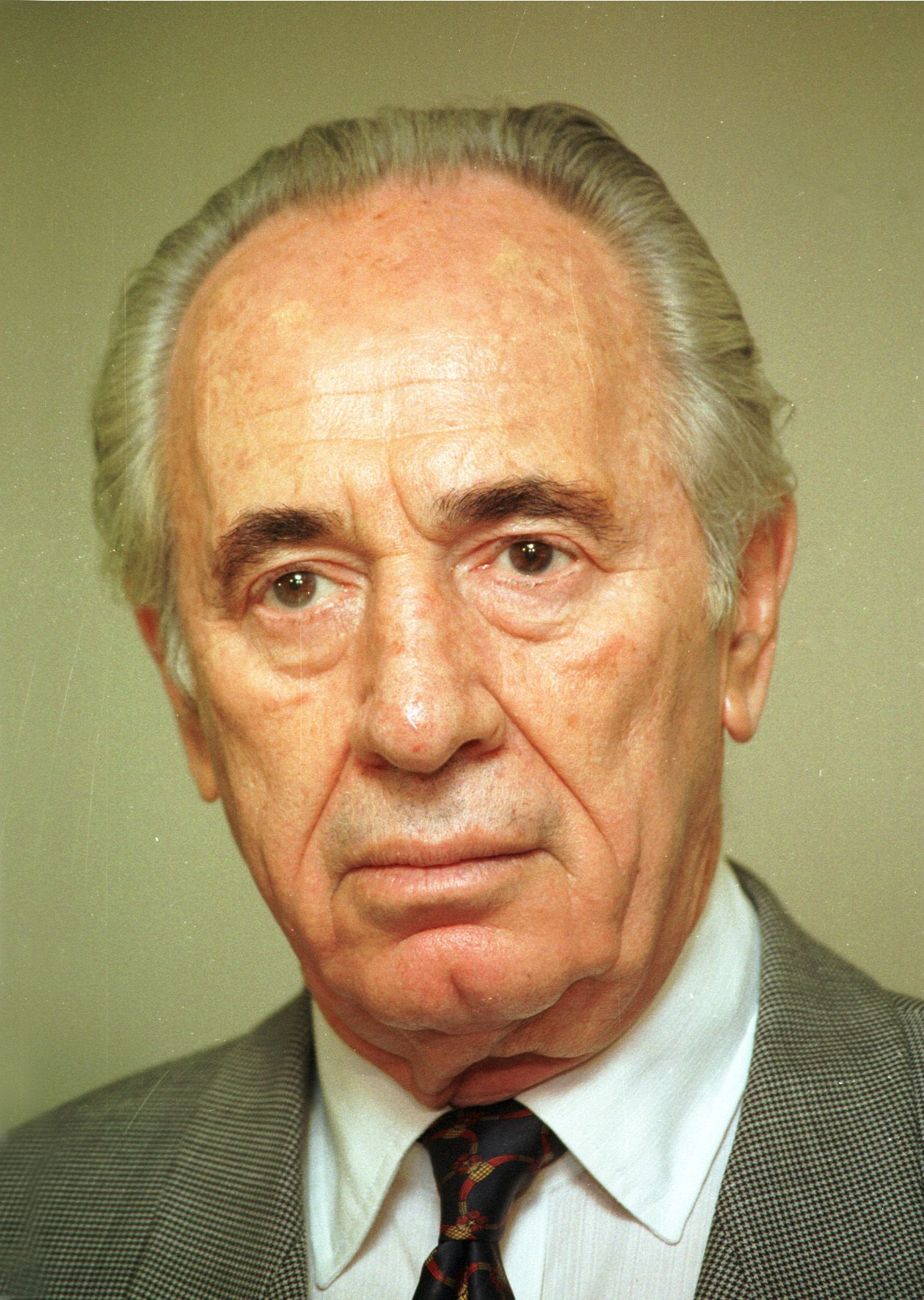
Candidate	Benjamin Netanyahu	Shimon Peres
Party	Likud	Labor
Popular vote	1,501,023	1,471,566
Percentage	50.50%	49.50%
Prime Minister before election
Shimon Peres
Labor Party
Prime Minister after election
Benjamin Netanyahu
Likud
- Knesset election
Party	Leader	Vote %	Seats	+/–
Labor	Shimon Peres	26.83	34	−10
Likud–Gesher–Tzomet	Benjamin Netanyahu	25.14	32	−8
Shas	Aryeh Deri	8.51	10	+4
Mafdal	Zevulun Hammer	7.87	9	+3
Meretz	Yossi Sarid	7.41	9	−3
Yisrael BaAliyah	Natan Sharansky	5.73	7	New
Hadash–Balad	Hashem Mahameed	4.24	5	+2
UTJ	Meir Porush	3.23	4	0
Third Way	Avigdor Kahalani	3.16	4	New
Ra'am–Mada	Abdulmalik Dehamshe	2.93	4	+2
Moledet	Rehavam Ze'evi	2.36	2	−1
This lists parties that won seats. See the complete results below.
Speaker of the Knesset before	Speaker of the Knesset after
Shevah Weiss; Labor	Dan Tichon; Likud

General elections were held in Israel on 29 May 1996. For the first time, the prime minister was elected on a separate ballot from the remaining members of the Knesset.

The elections for prime minister resulted in a surprise victory for Benjamin Netanyahu, by a margin of 29,457 votes, less than 1% of the total number of votes cast, and much smaller than the number of spoiled votes. This came after the initial exit polls had predicted a Shimon Peres win, spawning the phrase "went to sleep with Peres, woke up with Netanyahu". Although Peres lost the prime ministerial vote – his fourth and last defeat as Labor leader – Labor emerged as the largest party in the Knesset, winning two more seats than the Likud–Gesher–Tzomet alliance.

== Background ==
=== Peace process ===
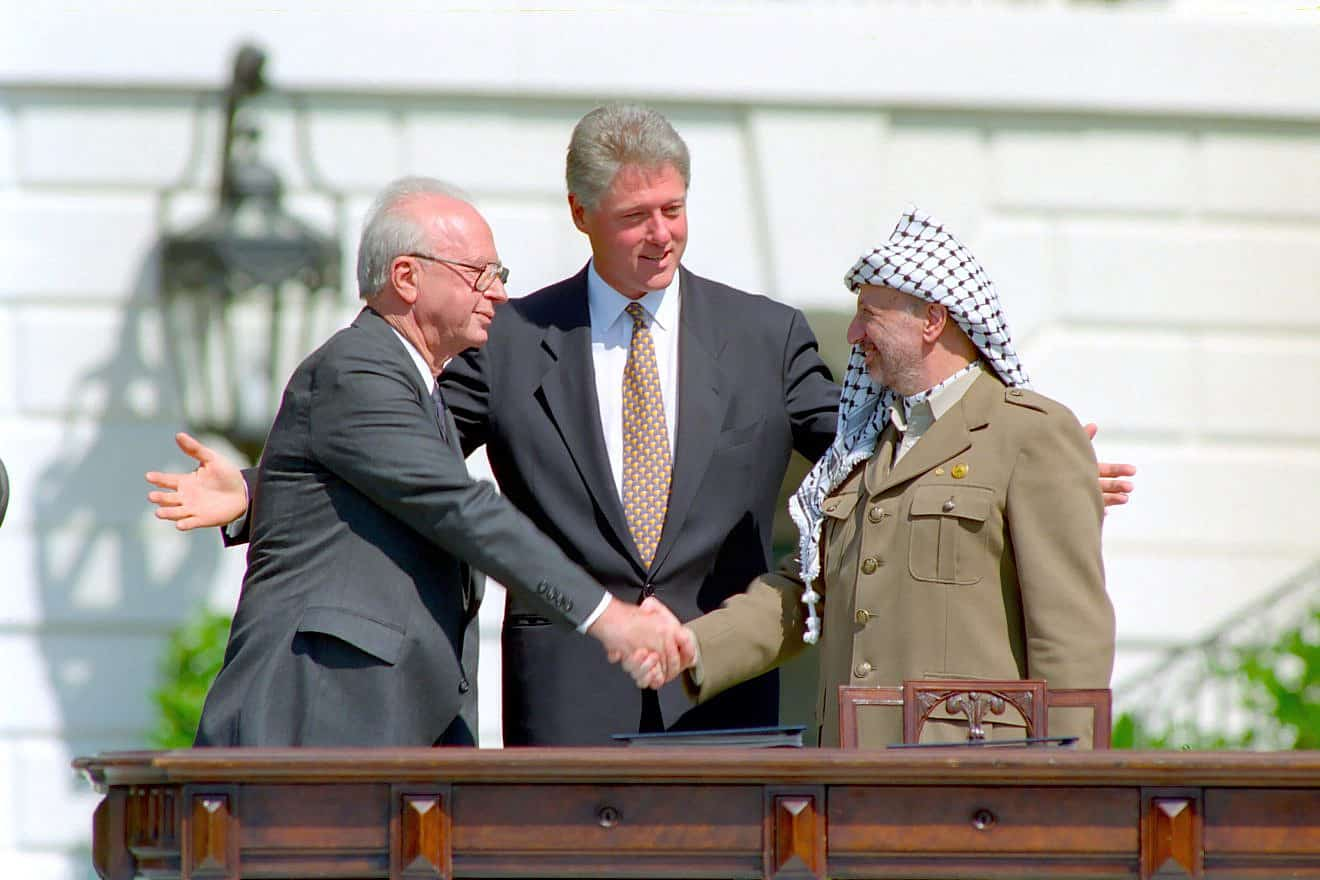
Yitzhak Rabin, Bill Clinton, and Yasser Arafat during the Oslo Accords on 13 September 1993

On 13 September 1993, Israel and the Palestine Liberation Organization (PLO) signed the Oslo Accords (a Declaration of Principles) on the South Lawn of the White House. The principles established objectives relating to a transfer of authority from Israel to an interim Palestinian authority, as a prelude to a final treaty establishing a Palestinian state.

On 25 July 1994, Jordan and Israel signed the Washington Declaration, which formally ended the state of war that had existed between them since 1948 and on 26 October the Israel–Jordan peace treaty, witnessed by U.S. President Bill Clinton.

Prime Minister Yitzhak Rabin and PLO Chairman Yasser Arafat signed the Israeli–Palestinian Interim Agreement on the West Bank and the Gaza Strip on 28 September 1995, in Washington. The agreement allowed the PLO leadership to relocate to the West Bank and Gaza Strip and granted autonomy to the Palestinians with talks to follow regarding final status. In return the Palestinians promised to abstain from use of terror and changed the Palestinian National Covenant, which had called for the expulsion of all Jews who migrated after 1917 and the elimination of Israel.

=== Assassination of Yitzhak Rabin ===
On 4 November 1995, at the end of a rally in support of the Oslo agreements held in the center of Tel Aviv, Prime Minister Rabin was assassinated. The murderer, Yigal Amir, a right-wing Jewish radical, was a law student at the Bar-Ilan University who fanatically opposed the Prime Minister's peace initiative, particularly the signing of the Oslo Accords. The assassination of Rabin was a shock to the Israeli public. Approximately 80 heads of state attended Rabin's funeral in Jerusalem.

== Parliament factions ==
The table below lists the parliamentary factions represented in the 13th Knesset.

Name		Ideology	Symbol	Leader	1992 result		Seats at 1996 dissolution
Name		Ideology	Symbol	Leader	Votes (%)	Seats	Seats at 1996 dissolution
	Labor	Social democracy	אמת	Shimon Peres	34.7%	44 / 120	42 / 120
	Likud	National liberalism Conservatism	מחל	Benjamin Netanyahu	24.9%	32 / 120	30 / 120
	Meretz	Progressivism; Secularism	מרצ	Yossi Sarid	9.6%	12 / 120	12 / 120
	Tzomet	National conservatism Secularism	ץ	Rafael Eitan	6.4%	8 / 120	5 / 120
	Mafdal	Religious Zionism	ב	Zvulun Hammer	5.0%	6 / 120	6 / 120
	Shas	Religious conservatism Populism	שס	Aryeh Deri	4.9%	6 / 120	5 / 120
	UTJ	Religious conservatism	ג	Avraham Yosef Shapira	3.3%	4 / 120	4 / 120
	Hadash	Communism; Socialism	ו	Tawfiq Ziad	2.4%	3 / 120	3 / 120
	Moledet	Ultranationalism	ט	Rehavam Ze'evi	2.4%	3 / 120	1 / 120
	Mada	Israeli Arab interests	עם	Abdulwahab Darawshe	1.6%	2 / 120	2 / 120
	Third Way	Golan Heights regionalism	הד	Avigdor Kahalani	-	0 / 120	2 / 120
	Gesher	Liberal conservatism Economic egalitarianism	-	David Levy	-	0 / 120	2 / 120
	Atid	Liberalism	-	Alex Goldfarb	-	0 / 120	2 / 120
	Yiud	Liberalism	-	Gonen Segev		0 / 120	1 / 120
	Yamin Yisrael	Ultranationalism		Shaul Gutman		0 / 120	1 / 120
-	Independent (Note: Efraim Gur, who left the Likud, Yosef Azran, who left Shas, and Yosef Ba-Gad, who left Moledet.)						3 / 120

== Campaign ==
Election posters for Likud and the Labor Party

After taking over from Yitzhak Rabin, following his assassination, Peres decided to call early elections, in order to give the government a mandate to advance the peace process.

King Hussein of Jordan's popularity in Israel had peaked after the Israel-Jordan peace treaty was signed, and he was expected to express support for a candidate. Hussein initially remained neutral, but later expressed support for Netanyahu. Efraim Halevy, then head of the Israeli intelligence agency (Mossad), said that Hussein had preferred Netanyahu over Peres, as he had deeply mistrusted the latter.

During the campaign, US president Bill Clinton attempted to influence the results of the election in favor of Peres, saying that, "I tried to do it in a way that didn't overtly involve me", because Peres was "more supportive of the peace process".

Netanyahu's campaign was helped by Australian mining magnate Joseph Gutnick, who donated over $1 million to Likud.

Nevertheless, Labor and Peres were comfortably ahead in the polls early in 1996, holding a lead of 20%. However, the country was hit by a spate of suicide attacks by Hamas, including the Jerusalem bus 18 massacres and other attacks in Ashkelon and the Dizengoff Center, which killed 59 people and severely damaged Peres' election chances. Polls taken in mid-May showed Peres ahead by just 4-6%, whilst two days before the election, his lead was down to 2%.

Several leading Haredi ("ultra-Orthodox") rabbis, including Elazar Shach, called on their followers to vote for Netanyahu, whilst Leah Rabin, Yitzhak's widow, called on Israelis to vote for Peres, so that her husband's death "would not be in vain". Netanyahu also warned that a Peres victory would lead to the division of Jerusalem in a final peace deal with the Palestinians.

Labor warned that Netanyahu's desire to continue settlements and 'annex 2 million Palestinians' to Israel would 'disrupt' the country's peace. Aside from their criticism of the peace process, Likud and their allies attacked Labor for their 'excessive' social spending.

Meretz, while supporting Peres, warned that a vote for the Labor Party would lead to a coalition with Mafdal, the Third Way, Shas and the UTJ, defeating hope for a secular government. This came after Meretz and Shas's bitter disputes as partners within the 1992-95 government, which led to the then-leader of Meretz Shulamit Aloni being dismissed from her post as Minister of Education.

Despite the national trauma which the assassination of Rabin caused, and although many blamed at the time the leaders of Israel's political right for the incitement that preceded the assassination, due to the series of suicide bombings carried out in Israel, and the failed military operation "Grapes of Wrath" conducted in Lebanon that caused many Lebanese civilian casualties, a significant change occurred in the position of the Israeli voters, which eventually resulted in 50.5 percent of voters supporting Netanyahu on election day. A significant number of Israeli Arabs boycotted the elections amidst rising Lebanese casualties, which became an advantage for Netanyahu, as the vast majority of Arabs would have supported Peres, but declined to vote. In addition, the intense campaign conducted by Netanyahu, in contrast to Peres's campaign, as well as the support Netanyahu received at the last moment from the Chabad movement, and other Haredim who wanted to ensure that Labor's staunchly secularist coalition partner, Meretz, would not return to government, tilted the outcome in Netanyahu's favour.

=== Endorsements by parties ===
Candidate	Party	Other parties supporting
Netanyahu	Likud	
Netanyahu	Likud	Gesher
Netanyahu	Likud	Mafdal
Netanyahu	Likud	Moledet
Netanyahu	Likud	Third Way
Netanyahu	Likud	Tzomet
Netanyahu	Likud	UTJ
Peres	Labor	Meretz
neither		Shas

=== Prime minister candidate slogans ===
Candidate	Original slogan	English translation
Netanyahu	"נתניהו - עושים שלום בטוח"	"Netanyahu, building a secure peace"
Peres	"ישראל חזקה עם פרס"	"Israel is strong with Peres"

=== Party slogans ===
Party or alliance	Original slogan	English translation
Labor	"ישראל גדולה עליך, ביבי"	"Israel is bigger than you, Bibi"
Meretz	"תנו למרצ לעלות!"	"Let Meretz rise!"
Meretz	"פתק אחד פרס, פתק אחד מרצ"	"One ballot for Peres, one ballot for Meretz"
Mafdal	"ציונות עם נשמה."	"Zionism with a soul."
UTJ	"ישראל צריכה גב חזק"	"Israel needs strong leadership"
Hadash–Balad	"עובדים לשלום ולשוויון"	"Working for peace and equality"
Hadash–Balad	"שלום זה חד"ש, שוויון זה חד"ש"	"Peace is Hadash, equality is Hadash"
Moledet	"רק מולדת בימין"	"Only a homeland [Moledet] on the right"
Third Way	"נפגשים במרכז"	"Meet in the middle [centre]"

== Debates ==
Date	Organizer	Moderator	P Present I Invitee N Non-invitee		
Date	Organizer	Moderator	Likud	Labor	Refs
			P Benjamin Netanyahu	P Shimon Peres	

== Results ==
=== Prime minister ===
Candidate	Party	Votes	%
Benjamin Netanyahu	Likud	1,501,023	50.50
Shimon Peres	Labor Party	1,471,566	49.50
Total		2,972,589	100.00
Valid votes		2,972,589	95.24
Invalid/blank votes		148,681	4.76
Total votes		3,121,270	100.00
Registered voters/turnout		3,933,250	79.36
Source: Nohlen et al.

Netanyahu's win was bolstered by large support from the Religious Zionist and Haredi ("ultra-Orthodox") community, 91.2% of whom voted for him. Peres on the other hand, gained overwhelming support from the country's Arab community, 97.5% of which backed him.

=== Knesset ===
Party	Votes	%	Seats	+/–
Labor Party	818,741	26.83	34	−10
Likud–Gesher–Tzomet	767,401	25.14	32	−8
Shas	259,796	8.51	10	+4
National Religious Party	240,271	7.87	9	+3
Meretz	226,275	7.41	9	−3
Yisrael BaAliyah	174,994	5.73	7	New
Hadash–Balad	129,455	4.24	5	+2
United Torah Judaism	98,657	3.23	4	0
Third Way	96,474	3.16	4	New
Ra'am–Mada	89,514	2.93	4	+2
Moledet	72,002	2.36	2	−1
Unity for the Defence of New Immigrants	22,741	0.75	0	New
Gil	14,935	0.49	0	New
Progressive Confederation	13,983	0.46	0	New
Telem Emuna	12,737	0.42	0	New
Settlement Party	5,533	0.18	0	New
Yamin Yisrael	2,845	0.09	0	New
Man's Rights in the Family Party	2,338	0.08	0	New
Ta'al	2,087	0.07	0	New
Da'am Workers Party	1,351	0.04	0	New
Total	3,052,130	100.00	120	0
Valid votes	3,052,130	97.83		
Invalid/blank votes	67,702	2.17		
Total votes	3,119,832	100.00		
Registered voters/turnout	3,933,250	79.32		
Source: CEC, Nohlen et al.

== Reactions ==
- James Baker, Secretary of State for former U.S. President George H. W. Bush, worried that Netanyahu's hard-line coalition partners would be able to boss him around and prevent him from advancing the peace process, even though the Israeli people want the peace process to continue.
- Warren Christopher, Secretary of State for U.S. President Bill Clinton, said that "President Clinton and [he] look forward to having a good working relationship with [Netanyahu]", and that it appeared "that Mr. Netanyahu was committed to pursuing the peace process".
- U.S. President Bill Clinton called Netanyahu and congratulated him on his election victory. Clinton also told Arab countries not to "pre-judge" the new Netanyahu government. Clinton invited Netanyahu to visit the White House, and "[Clinton] affirmed the continued support of the United States for the people of Israel in their quest for peace with security" in a White House statement. The White House decided to consider Netanyahu's election win as a positive, despite the fact that Clinton supported Netanyahu's opponent Shimon Peres in this election.
- Bob Dole, the 1996 Republican presidential nominee, "said [that] he could "work with [Netanyahu]" and that he was confident "that Netanyahu was "committed to peace""
- David Grossman, Israeli author, said that "Netanyahu's election shows that at least half of the people are not really mature enough for the peace process", since while "[t]hey want peace", "they're not willing to make the concessions it takes".
- Yossi Klein Halevi, senior writer for The Jerusalem Report, warned Netanyahu against implementing a right-wing agenda and attempting to stop the peace process since Israel at that time was very divided and polarized, and most Israeli voters still supported the peace process.
- Michael Lerner, editor and publisher of Tikkun, speculated that "[Netanyahu's election victory is] going to undermine the peace process severely", and that while Netanyahu will claim that he supports the peace process, he will "subtly underm[ine it]" whenever he will be able to.
- Norman Podhoretz, editor of Commentary magazine, said that he didn't think that Netanyahu would be able to stop the peace process completely, but that he expected the Palestinian Authority to have a civil war with Hamas after the establishment of a Palestinian state, which would then be used by Syria and other hostile Arab states to intervene in Palestine and start a new war with Israel, in order "to make one last effort to wipe the Jewish state off the map".
- Leah Rabin, widow of assassinated Israeli Prime Minister Yitzhak Rabin, said that it is "very difficult to say what will be in the future", but that she "think[s] Netanyahu will try [to continue the peace process]" despite objections from hard-liners in his party.
- Nadav Safran, professor emeritus at Harvard University, said that Netanyahu would take a much harder line with Syria and the Palestinians in negotiations, and that he would also attempt to slow down the peace process. He said that Netanyahu's hard-line positions could start another armed conflict with the Palestinians if Netanyahu did not show more flexibility in his positions later on.
- Elie Wiesel, writer and Holocaust survivor, said that he "[didn't] think that [the impact of the elections on the peace process] will change much", since "[Netanyahu] has already said he will respect the achievements in negotiations", and since the peace process is irreversible. He also pointed out that while Netanyahu talked tough, so did Menachem Begin 20 years before that, and Begin ultimately signed a peace treaty with Egypt a few years after he was elected.

== Aftermath ==
Likud supporters celebrate the election results outside Hilton Tel Aviv

Despite winning the election for prime minister, Netanyahu's Likud (in an alliance with Gesher and Tzomet) lost the Knesset elections to Labour, winning only 32 seats compared to Labour's 34.

The objective of strengthening the position of prime minister by having separate elections was also a failure, as the election saw both major parties lose around ten seats compared to the 1992 election (Likud held only 24 of the 32 seats it won in its alliance) as many gave their Knesset votes to smaller parties; Labour received 818,570 votes to Peres' 1.47 million, (56%), whilst the Likud–Gesher–Tzomet alliance managed even less—767,178 compared to 1.50 million for Netanyahu (51%).

With only 32 seats, the Likud–Gesher–Tzomet alliance was, at the time, the smallest faction to lead a government in Israeli political history (the previous low had been Mapai's 40 seats in the 1955 election; since then, the 2006 elections saw Kadima emerge as the largest party with just 29 seats, and the 2009 election was won by Kadima with 28 seats, but Likud with 27 formed the government). This meant Netanyahu had to form a coalition with several smaller parties, including the National Religious Party, Yisrael BaAliyah the Third Way and the two ultra-orthodox parties Shas and United Torah Judaism whose financial policies (generous child benefits and state funding for religious activities) were in direct opposition to his capitalistic outlook.

Netanyahu faced several issues; the left argued the peace process was advancing too slowly, but signing the Hebron Agreement and the Wye River Memorandum also caused him problems with the right-wing. Gesher broke away from the alliance with Likud and left the government coalition in January 1998. Netanyahu was forced to call early elections in 1999 due to problems passing the state budget.

=== 14th Knesset ===
During the Knesset term several new parties were created by defecting MKs. Three MKs left the Labor Party to establish One Nation; Two MKs from the Labor Party and four from Likud left to form the Centre Party (Eliezer Sandberg later broke away from the Centre Party and formed HaTzeirim before joining Shinui, a new party created by Avraham Poraz after he left Meretz); three other Likud MKs left to establish Herut – The National Movement; three members of Gesher and two members of Tzomet also left alliance. Two MKs left the National Religious Party to establish Tkuma; two MKs left Yisrael BaAliyah to establish Aliyah; and Moshe Peled broke away from Tzomet and formed Mekhora before joining Moledet.

In 1999, David Zucker left Meretz and Emanuel Zisman left the Third Way to sit as independents.

Prior to the 1999 elections, Balad left its alliance with Hadash and United Torah Judaism split into Agudat Yisrael (three seats) and Degel HaTorah (one seat)

== See also ==
- 1996 Israeli Labor Party primary
- Party lists for the 1999 Israeli general election
