= 2022 Meretz leadership election =

Election for leader of the Meretz Party

← 2019	23 August 2022
- Turnout: 80.84%
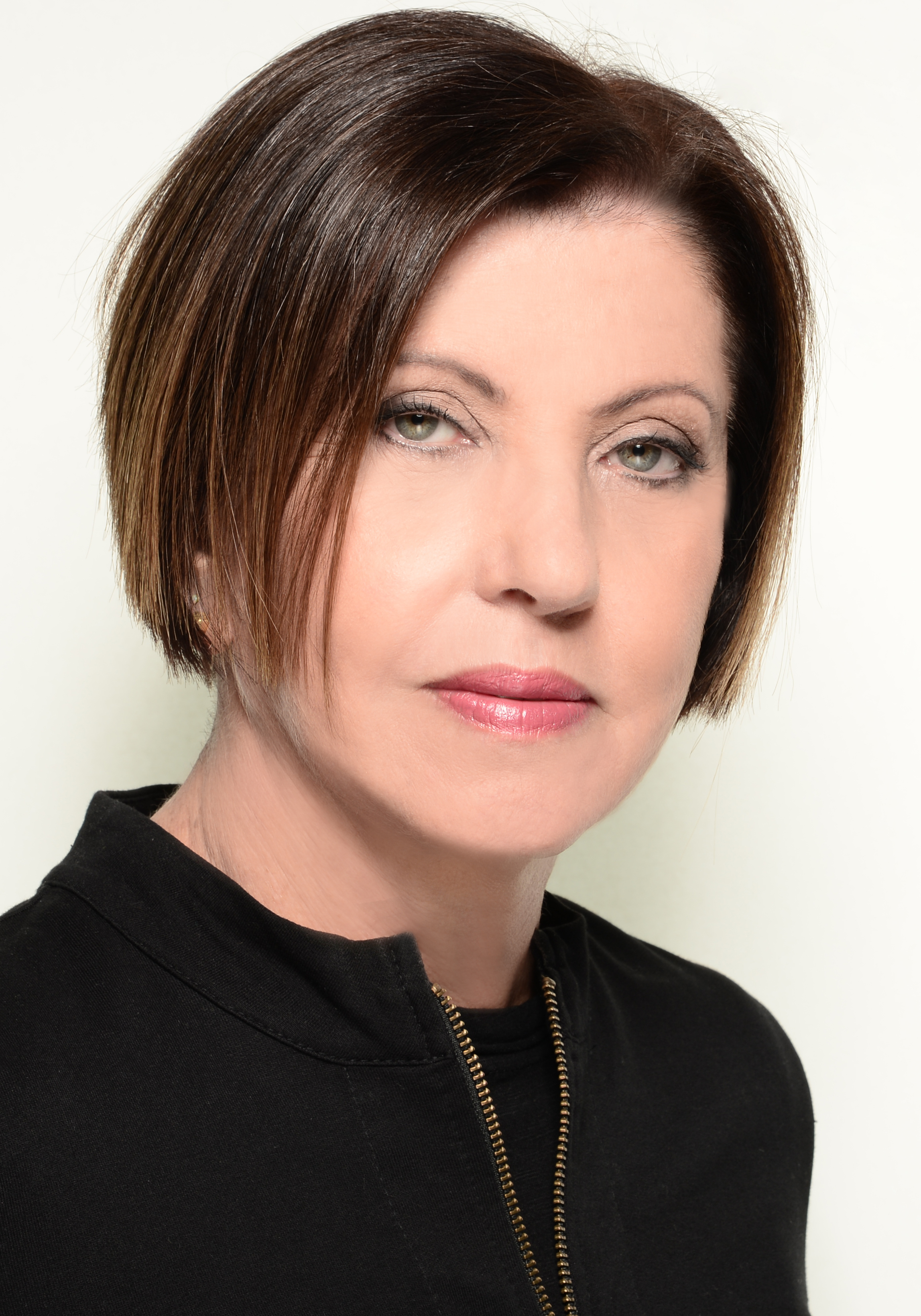

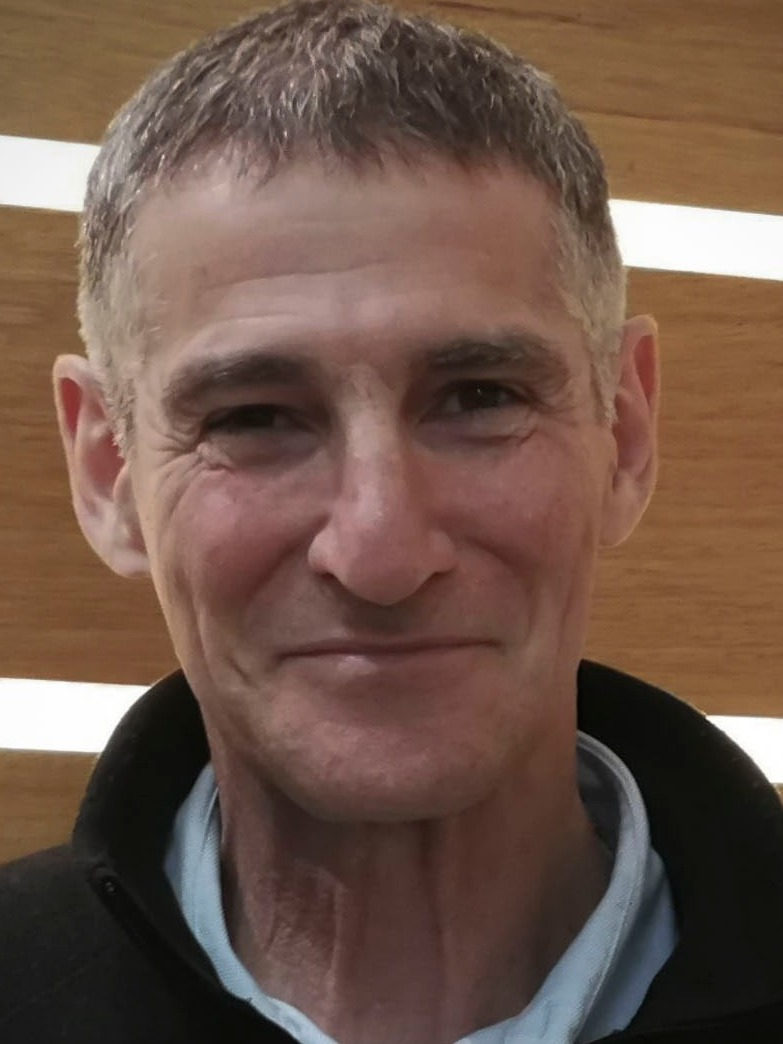
Candidate	Zehava Galon	Yair Golan
Party	Meretz	Meretz
Popular vote	9,443	5,710
Percentage	61.6%	37.25%
Meretz leader before election
Nitzan Horowitz
Meretz leader
Zehava Galon

The 2022 Meretz leadership election was held on 23 August 2022 in the leadup to the 2022 Israeli legislative election. On 12 July, incumbent Nitzan Horowitz announced that he would not seek re-election as leader. Former party leader Zehava Galon defeated former deputy Chief of the General Staff Yair Golan.

== Background ==
In June 2019, incumbent leader of Meretz Tamar Zandberg was defeated by Nitzan Horowitz in a vote held by the party's conference ahead of a legislative election in September. Following his election, Horowitz formed an alliance with the Israel Democratic Party and the Green Party, named the Democratic Union. The alliance won five seats in the election. In the 2020 election, Meretz ran in a joint list with the Israeli Labor Party and Gesher, which won seven seats. In December 2020, Yair Golan, who previously led the Israel Democratic Party, announced that he would join Meretz. Meretz ran alone in the 2021 election, where it won six seats, and subsequently participated the thirty-sixth government, the first time Meretz sat in a government since 2001.

Criticism of incumbent party leader Nitzan Horowitz's leadership included a failure to keep the party's Knesset members in line, which was blamed for playing a factor in the breakdown of the governing coalition. After an early Knesset election was called, polls showed Meretz polling near (and often below) the electoral threshold. Despite the interest of leadership within Meretz to run on a joint list with the Israeli Labor Party in the coming election, that party's leader, Merav Michaeli, had dismissed the possibility of this.

On 12 July 2022, Horowitz announced he would not seek re-election as party leader, but would remain in politics. On 18 July, following speculation regarding a potential candidacy, former leader of Meretz Zehava Galon stated that she would "Announce when there is something to announce", neither confirming nor denying reports that she was considering a run. The next day, Galon announced she would run for the leadership of Meretz.

== Candidates ==
=== Ran ===
- Yair Golan, member of the Knesset since 2020, deputy economy minister, former deputy chief of the General Staff of the Israel Defense Forces
- Zehava Galon, former party leader (2012–2018) and former member of the Knesset

=== Withdrew ===
The following individual withdrew from the election:

- Nitzan Horowitz, party leader since 2019 and health minister

=== Did not run ===
The following individual was speculated as a potential candidate, but did not run:

- Tamar Zandberg, former party leader (2018–2019) and minister of environmental protection since 2021

== Campaign ==
On 6 July 2022, Yair Golan announced his candidacy for Meretz leadership, setting up a contested leadership vote. On 12 July 2022, incumbent leader Horowitz withdrew from seeking reelection as party leader. While former party leader Zehava Galon had originally dismissed the possibility of a run at the time that Yair Galon entered the race, calls for her to run continued. On 19 July, Galon announced her candidacy.

In running against Galon, who had already once served as party leader, Yair Golan cast himself as presenting the opportunity to lead the party towards the future rather than the past. As a former leader of the party, Zehava Galon was regarded to be the candidate preferred by most of party bureaucrats, party leaders, and Knesset members belonging to the party. Yair Golan, however, enjoyed strong support among Kibbutzim members of the party, as well as a constituency of Bedouins living in the Negev. Controversially, nearly a thousand Bedouins had been disqualified from the party voter roll ahead of the election.

== Results ==
2022 Meretz leadership election
Party	Candidate	Votes	%
Meretz	Zehava Galon	9,443	61.6%
Meretz	Yair Golan	5,710	37.25%
	Abstaining	176	1.15%
Turnout		15,329	80.84%

== Coinciding party list primary ==
Primaries to determine the party list for the 2022 election were held on 23 August 2022 in conjunction with the leadership vote. As party leader, Zehava Galon was positioned first on the list. Yair Golan was voted fifth position on the party list. Outgoing party leader Horowitz was positioned seventh on the party list. The party was regarded as very unlikely to win as many as seven mandates in the election.

Results of party list primary
Candidate	Votes	%	Pos.	Notes
Zehava Galon	—		1st	Position by virtue of election as party leader
Mossi Raz (incumbent)	6,751	35.60	2nd	
Michal Rozin (incumbent)	6,439	42.01	3rd	
Ali Salalha (incumbent)	5,981	39.02	4th	
Yair Golan (incumbent)	5,906	38.53	5th	
Gaby Lasky (incumbent)	4,886	31.87	6th	
Nitzan Horowitz (incumbent)	3,608	25.54	7th	
Mazen Abu Siam	3,295	21.50	8th	
Omayma Hamad	2,255	14.71	9th	Position elevated per gender balancing rules
Ayed Badir	2,966	19.35	10th	
Katy Fiaszki Morag	2,122	13.84	11th	Position elevated per gender balancing rules
Omer Shechter	2,938	19.17	12th	
Yariv Oppenheimer	2,740	17.87	13th	
Shanna Orlik	1,190	7.76	14th	Position elevated per gender balancing rules
Uri Zaki	2,803	17.63	15th	
Eliran Bykhovsky	2,545	16.60	—	
Eyal Raiz	1,443	9.41	—	
Anat Nir	1,144	7.46	—	
Laura Wharton	742	4.84	—	
Rabia Gadir	677	4.42	—	
Ilanit Harush	434	2.83	—	
Ofra Kaplan	223	1.45	—	
David Kashni	64	0.42	—	
Abstaining	66	0.43	—	
