= Climate change in Israel =

Köppen climate classification map for Israel for 1991–2020

2071–2100 map under the most intense climate change scenario. Mid-range scenarios are currently considered more likely

Israel, like many other countries in the Middle East and North Africa, experiences adverse effects from climate change. Annual and mean temperatures are increasing in Israel, with mean temperature expected to increase between 1.6 and 1.8 °C (2.9 and 3.2 °F) by 2100. There is a reduction in annual precipitation and delayed winter rains. Israel is already experiencing droughts and water shortages. Heatwaves are other natural hazards expected to increase with climate change.

Climate change has exacerbated existing problems that come with living in a dry and arid region. Droughts have been more frequent and longer in recent years, which poses a risk to agriculture and water access. With the loss of agricultural land, many people are forced to move to urban areas. Urban areas, like Tel Aviv and Jerusalem are now facing overpopulation. Climate change has and will continue to have a significant impact on all areas of Israel as well as all people of Israel. Furthermore, lower income communities from Israel such as inhabitants from developing cities, new immigrants, ultra-orthodox jews, and Bedouins, as well as women, children, the elderly, and the chronically ill will experience the brunt of the burden of climate change.

Israel contributes 0.5% of global greenhouse gas emissions (GHG). These GHG come mainly from the power and industry sectors. Israel's emissions are predominately from gas and coal burning. Israel signed the Paris Agreement, and as a party to the global climate action it has committed to reduce its GHG by 27% below 2015 levels by reducing carbon emissions from municipal waste, transportation, and electricity sectors.

== Greenhouse gas emissions ==
=== Energy consumption ===
Energy in Israel is predominately from fossil gas and oil, although Israel has begun to use more renewables. The energy sector makes up the largest percent of total carbon emissions from Israel, at 48%. By 2030, Israel wants to reduce its energy consumption emissions by 30% by phasing out coal (by 2026) and switching to more gas while increasing the use of renewables.

=== Transportation ===
After energy consumption, transportation is the second largest emitter of carbon at 22%. To decrease these emissions, Israel plans to have clean energy municipal buses and limiting new car emissions. To reduce car and truck emissions, Israel is going to ban gas cars from being imported by 2030.

=== Air quality ===
Due to substantial growth in vehicle use and emissions from coal- and oil-fired power plants, the presence of Nitrogen Oxides (NOx) and Sulfur Oxides (SOx) in the air near Israel's major urban centers have increased significantly between 1980 and 2002. Nitrogen oxides doubled during these years. Also, CO_{2} increased by 190% and incidents of respiratory illness among children increased from 5% to 17%. Although greenhouse gas emissions have steadily risen from 1996 to 2007, as of 2010, concentrations of Nitrogen oxides and other pollutants have decreased around major traffic sites. Additionally, falling Sulfur oxide levels have been observed and attributed to more efficient fuel use in industrial power plants. However, despite the benefits greener technology in lowering per-capita emissions, rapid population growth and increased per-capita consumption have led to an overall decrease in air quality. Air quality is expected to worsen without proper policy measures to reduce pollutants.

== Impacts ==
=== Temperature and weather changes ===
The Israel Meteorological Service has noted "a significant warming trend in all regions of the country." Increased heatwaves are caused by increased global temperatures from climate change. By the end of the 21st century, heatwaves in Israel will last three times longer and happen seven times more often. People located in the coast, lowlands, Northern Negev, and mountain region are susceptible to higher rates of warming than other regions in Israel. Each heatwave in Israel leads to 45 deaths on average. According to Israel Meteorological Service, peak temperature could reach 49.4 degrees Celsius in Tel Aviv-Yafo and 48 degrees Celsius in Jerusalem and 55.3 degrees Celsius in Eilat by the end of the 21st century.

By the end of the 21st century, heatwaves may result in about 330 deaths each summer. In June 2023, 300,000 people in Israel were left without electricity in the middle of a heatwave, which showed that the country is not prepared for the impacts of climate change. To cope with the changing world, "interdisciplinary regional collaborations are required to develop adequate public health adaptation to extreme weather events in a changing climate."

According to the OECD's report, in the medium scenario of warming (SSP 2-4.5) by the years 2080 - 2099 the average Israeli will be exposed to 80 days with temperature surpassing 35 degrees per year (third highest result from all countries reviewed in the report), to 145 warm nights (the increase from current levels is second highest). The increase in drought conditions and the exposure to drought conditions in those years in Israel is the highest of all countries reviewed in the report.

=== Precipitation ===
Israel is the sixteenth most water stressed country in the world.

Israel is expected to experience a 10% reduction in overall rainfall by the end of the 21st century due to climate change according to data from Israeli Ministry of Environmental Protection as of 2020, with Israel Meteorological Service's estimate in 2024 predict a reduction of 20-25% in both rainfall amounts and rainy days. This change will result in water scarcity that is coupled with increased salinity. As a result of this change, the flow of the Jordan River will decrease by 22%. In 2020, the Ministry of Environmental Protection noted that climate change is expected to reduce rainfall, imperiling the availability of fresh water for the region. Yields of certain crops are expected to be damaged, as are industries for livestock and fishing. Currently, Israel does not experience a major difference in precipitation, but they do however experience a difference in distribution, frequency, and intensity of rain events such as an increase in rainfall in some regions and a decrease in others. Since 2000, there are less rainy days, but the rains are more intense. Long dry periods in the winter and extreme rain events with cold weather can negatively impact agriculture and natural ecosystems. These extreme weather events will result in both droughts and flooding, which is especially a hazard in urbanized settings. The change in rainfall can be serious considering Israel's already arid climate.

=== Sea level rise ===
Various factors linked to the climate change, ranging from glacier melting(which form around 40% of sea level change contributions for Israeli EEZ between 1993 and 2024), changes in rainfall pattern and others, are contributing to rising sea levels along the Mediterranean basin, rising around 14.59 cm between 1992 and 2022. The rising sea "will ultimately affect all of Israel's coasts, from Rosh Hanikra to the border of the Gaza Strip," potentially leading to saltwater infiltration of aquifer groundwater and degrading coastal cliffs. Saltwater infiltration will affect agriculture through damaged crops which is a large source of revenue for Israel. As of right now, the approximate rate of sea level rise is 0.4-0.5 cm per year. According to Noga Kronfeld-Schor, the Ministry of Environmental Protection's head scientist, due to melting rate increases, sea level rise in Israel would have reached 5m by 2150. This change in sea level will dramatically decrease beach availability which has the potential to adversely affect tourist attraction, and it could also cause . Israel's long coastline will require infrastructure such as "residences, hotels, heritage sites, factories" and other major projects to be moved. Due to climate change, the sea will also become warmer and more acidic which has the potential to decrease the biodiversity of aquatic species.

=== Water resources ===
Due to predictions of decreasing precipitation(both in time period and in amount), falling level of water bodies and increasing temperature, the IPCC "general circulation models projections agree on drying scenarios in the region by the end of the 21st century." Since Israel is located in an arid/semi-arid region, any changes to precipitation in the area will severely affect water resources, not to count strategical and geopolitical challenges this could have caused in a high-sensitivity region. For agriculture, Israel depends heavily on irrigation and water availability. The decrease in water availability can be seen in the decrease in incoming freshwater into the Sea of Galilee(notwithstanding temporary changes from raining in individual years, e.g. 2018). Any change in freshwater will also result in a change in salinity of the water. In response, Israel has used desalinated water for 60-80% of Israel's drinking water supply, and desalination increased by 120% between 2010 and 2019. This effort has placed Israel as a leading nation in desalination processes and recovery of wastewater. Israel's main source of water is the upper Jordan River. Overall, stream flows in the region have been documented as decreasing at a faster rate than rainfall measurements. These data indicate that evaporation is affecting the Jordan River more than a decrease rainfall.

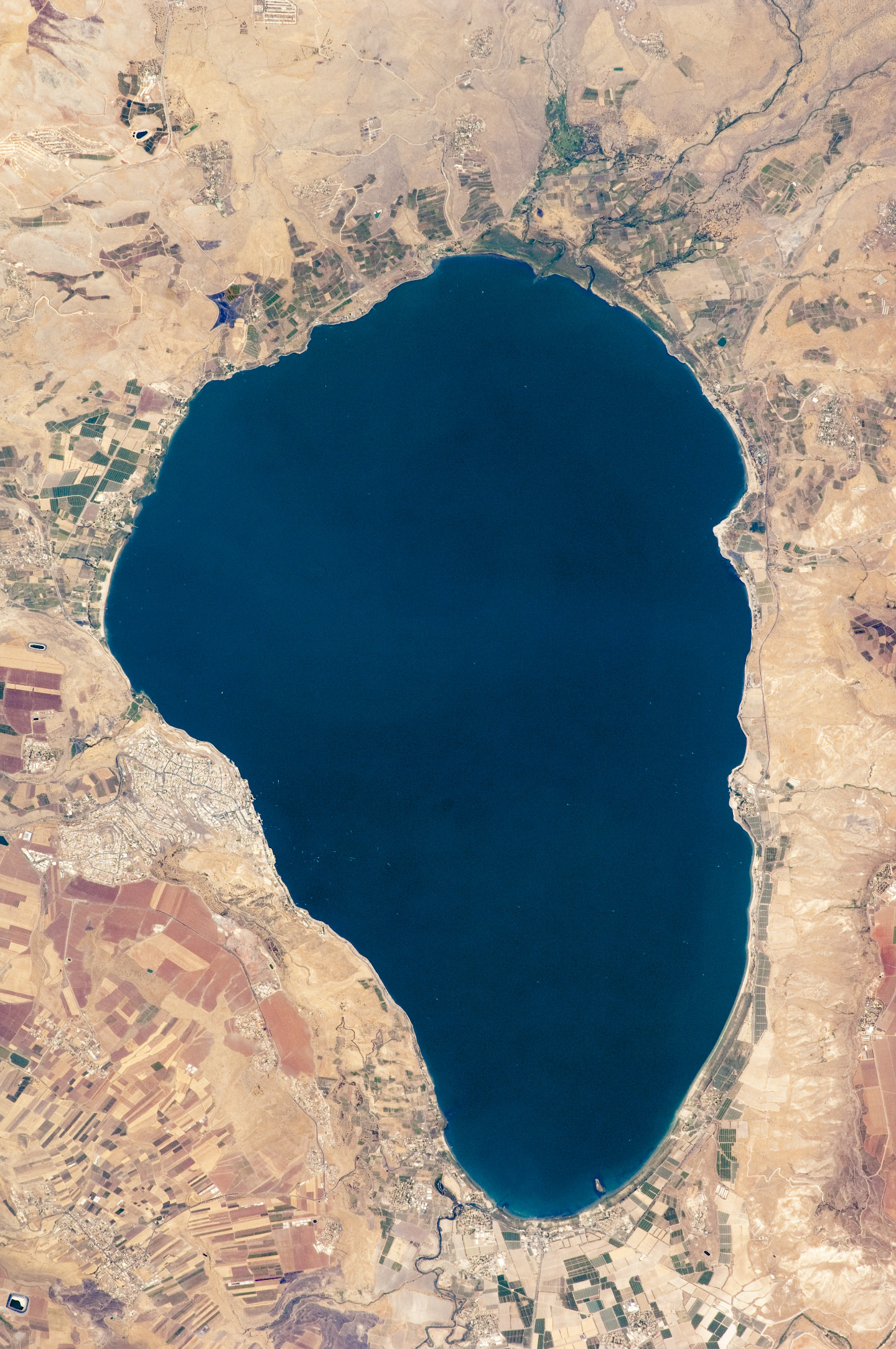
Lake Tiberias or Kinneret. The lake's level is significantly impacted by climate change.

=== Ecosystems ===
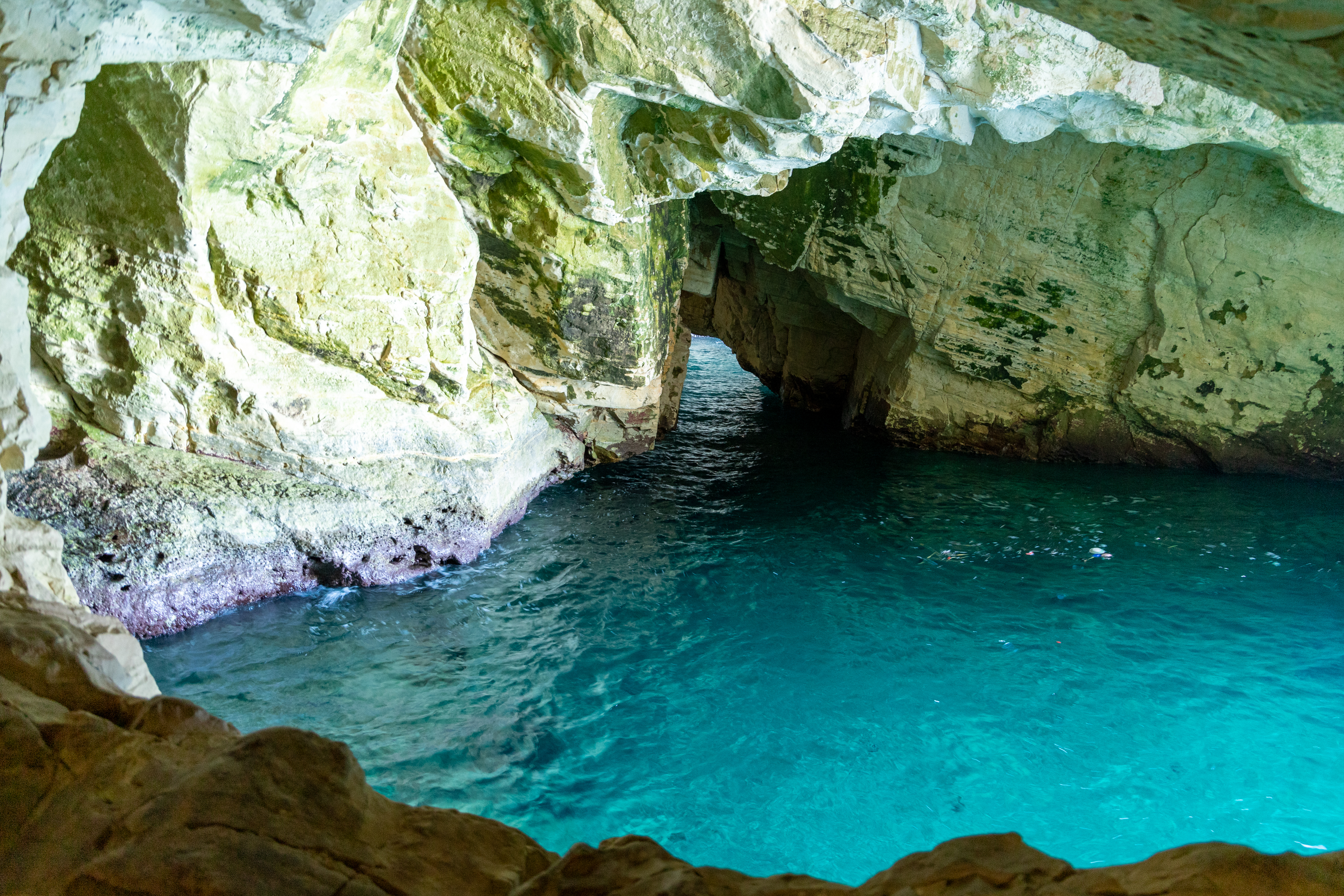
Rosh Hanikra

Rising temperatures due to climate change are profoundly impacting habitats especially those located in coastal regions. Coastal regions are also experiencing an increase of invasive species entering the Mediterranean through the Suez Canal. Dozens of species that are from more tropical environments are able to migrate to Israel's waters with the rising ocean temperatures. As a result of these changes in the ecosystems, Israel is working to protect its 118-mile coastline and ensure protection of biodiversity as well as keeping existing habitats safe from human interference. The Rosh Hanikra Marine Reserve has documented the survival of key species as a result of just a few years of protection through conservation. Since 2019, Israel has increased its coastline protection from 0.3% to 4% protected areas. Another 4.5% will be protected in the coming years. These levels of protection are not in line with the 2020 target of 10% protected coastline. In terms of land, 24% of Israel is considered nature reserves. The establishment of protected areas is becoming increasingly difficult with the influx of the population.

However, the ecosystem impacts will be uneven. A recent study about the ecosystems of Israel and climate change projections on native Israeli plants, demonstrated that a multi-year induced drought did not show to have a significant or detrimental effect on the semi-arid/Mediterranean plants tested. While the study only tested plants from two major ecosystem types, it challenges claims that climate change will have serious negative effects on all ecosystems of Israel.

== Impacts on people ==
Climate change has led to adverse impacts on the economy, agriculture, population health, and stability in Israel. Indeed, according to a study from 2023, climate change-linked heat wave could claim as many as 330 people each summer unless the issues have been addressed, with the above-65 population being most at risk. Climate change in Israel has disproportionate effects on vulnerable populations, such as women, children, the elderly, immigrants and marginalized communities.

=== Health ===
Climate change directly affects vulnerable populations such as women, children, the elderly, and the chronically ill. Increasing heat waves, decreasing rainfall, worsening air quality, lack of access to drinking water and food disproportionately affect these populations. Populations who suffer from chronic disorders are more susceptible to health issues related to poor air quality, high temperatures, and water-borne illnesses. Extreme heat caused by climate change can also be dangerous for pregnant women and affect child development in the womb. Migrants, refugees, Palestinians, and Bedouins who are not connected to the electricity grid may not be able to afford air conditioners or have access to healthcare facilities.

=== Economy ===
Israel's agricultural sector will be severely affected by decreased precipitation, soil erosion, and soil salination in the region, which will lead to food scarcity in many communities. Due to sea warming leading to higher concentrations of salt, has adversely impacted the fishing industry. Climate change will decrease supply of food, therefore increasing the price, making food insecurity a real possibility.

=== Tourism ===
Tourism in Israel is impacted by changes in weather and temperature. Tourism makes up approximately 2.8% of GDP and 3.5% of job employment. Due to Israel's mild climate, many tourists travel there all year long. However, during the summer months of July and August, the height of tourism season, Israel's weather becomes more humid and hot which is exacerbated by climate change. The tourism sector is both affected by climate change and a contributor to climate change, specifically when international travel is used. Israel offers tourists a multitude of outdoor recreation activities and national parks, which is why it is such a popular travel destination.

=== International Cooperation ===
Israel is party to several international agreements regarding air pollution and climate change, including the Kyoto Protocol, the UN Framework Convention on Climate Change and Montreal Protocol. Despite having taken these steps, Israel's environment continues to suffer as a rapidly growing population and standard of living contributes to increasing Greenhouse Gas emissions and air pollutants.

== Mitigation ==
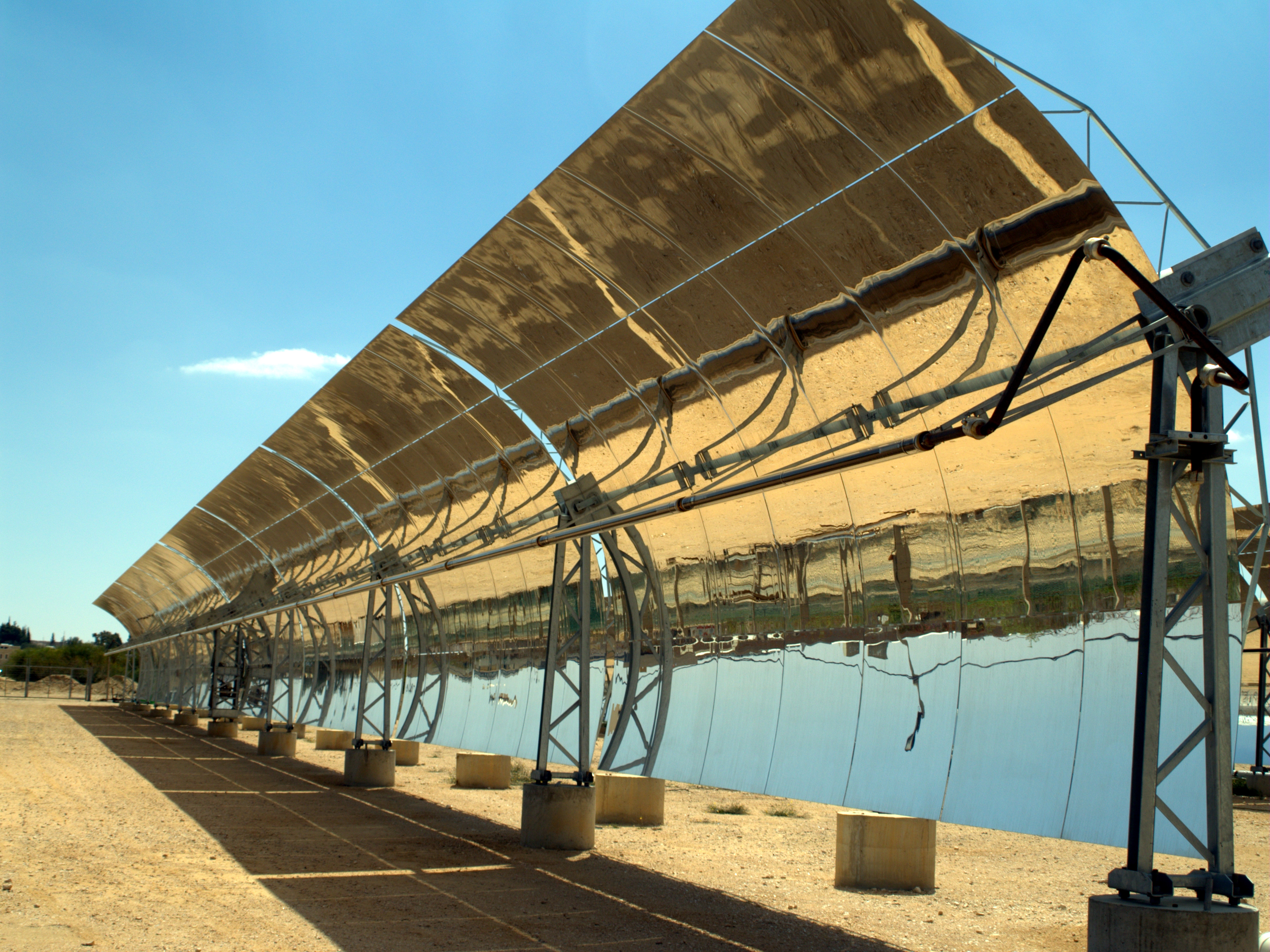
Solar troughs in the Negev desert of Israel

Despite Israel having low overall emissions in comparison to other countries, Israel must either mitigate the effects of climate change or adapt. According to the INDS (Intended Nationally Determined Contribution) of Israel, the main mitigation target is to reduce per capita greenhouse gas emissions to 8.8 tCO2e by 2025 and to 7.7 tCO2e by 2030. Total emissions should equal 81.65 MtCO2e in 2030. If no mitigation efforts are implemented, the emissions would reach 105.5 MtCO2e by 2030 or 10.0 tCO2e per capita. To reach the target, the government of Israel wants to reduce the consumption of electricity by 17%, produce 17% of electricity from renewables, and shift 20% of transportation from cars to public transport by 2030. In Israel's latest report on GHG emissions in 2023, emissions were measured at 77.415 MtCO2e. These levels are a 35% increase from the emissions from 1996. However, due to mitigation tactics, they are a 1.5% decrease from the levels in 2015. The report also concluded that fuel combustion and energy industry are the largest source of emissions.

Israel's use of renewable energy will mitigate the effects of climate change and develop resiliency in the country's energy systems. In Israel, policymakers tend to prioritize renewable energy more for a strategy for mitigation rather than a means for adaptation. In August 2021, Karine Elharrar, the minister of energy, stopped giving new licenses for oil searching on land in Israel. Later, in December 2021, Elharrar stopped the issuing of new licences for gas searching offshore at least for one year. According to Elharrar priority will be given to renewable energy and fighting climate change. Overall, Israel's prioritization of mitigation and efforts to minimize the effects of climate change have proven less effective than the adaptive efforts of the EU and other countries.

In October 2020, the Israeli government set a goal for 2030 to have 30% of their energy generated from renewables, a goal updated to 40% by 2022. This goal would cut their emission levels from 2015 by 85%. However, in 2021, Israel only generated 8% of their electricity and 5% of total energy consumption from renewable sources(mostly through solar energy), the second lowest share in OECD. The figure in 2024 was 10%. Under Israel's commitment to the Paris Agreement and the United Nations Framework Convention their goal is to attain zero emissions by 2050. To reach the 2030 target, various ministries within the Israeli government are working with local governments to promote the use and investment in cleaner transportation. In terms of physical developments toward these goals, the Eilat-Eilot Renewable Energy Initiative has created a renewable energy hub located in the southern Arava region of Israel. Israel also established a committee with the goal of evaluating the country's potential to reduce emissions by the year 2030. Their findings have confirmed that Israel's power sector generates approximately half of the country's total GHG emissions. The second largest offender is the transport sector, which produces approximately 19% of total emissions. Amidst the Israel-Hamas and Israel-Hezbollah wars of 2023-25, it was suggested that transitions to renewable energy would be more helpful for areas exposed to the conflict.

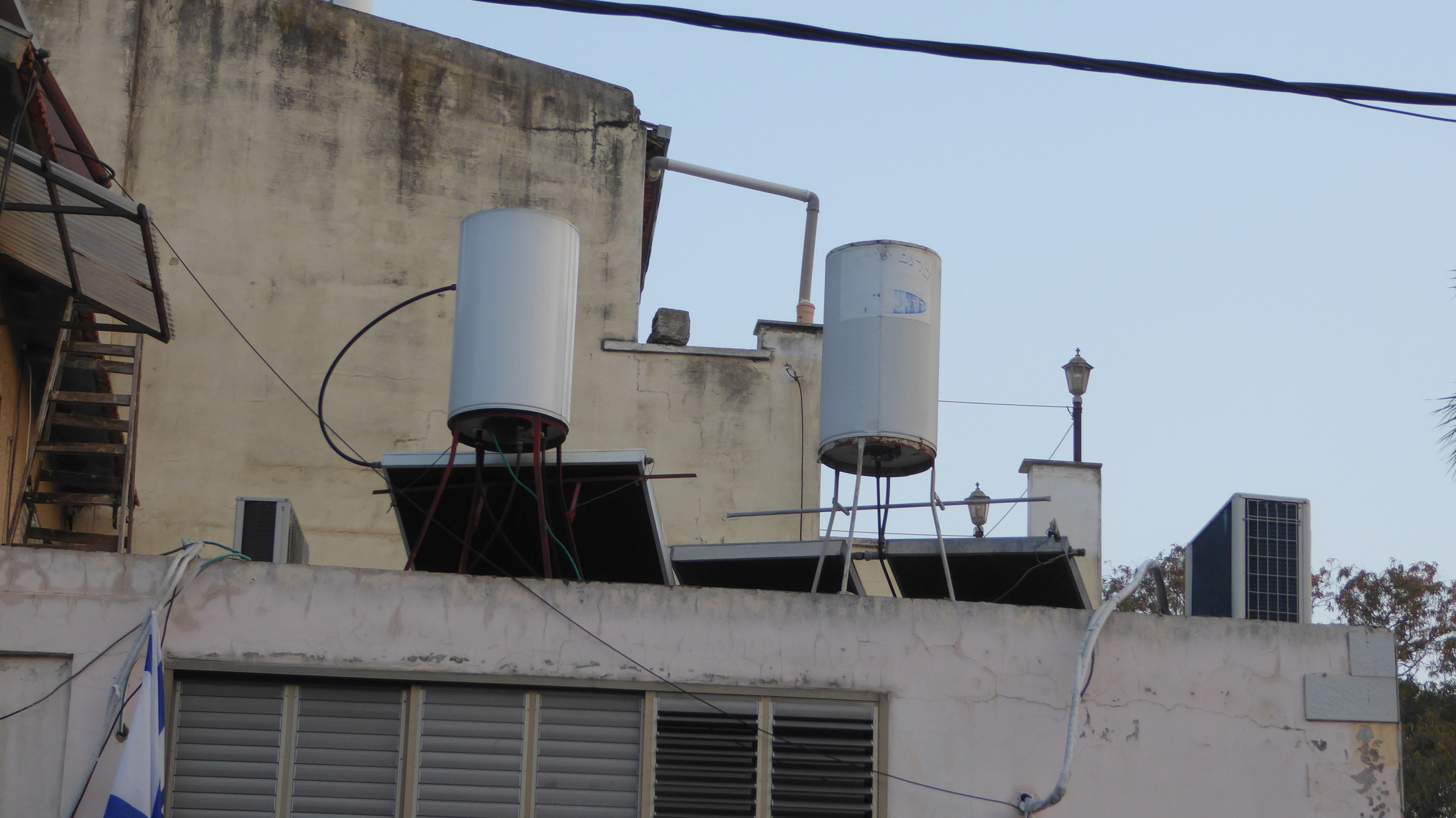
A solar water heater in Ramat Gan, Israel.

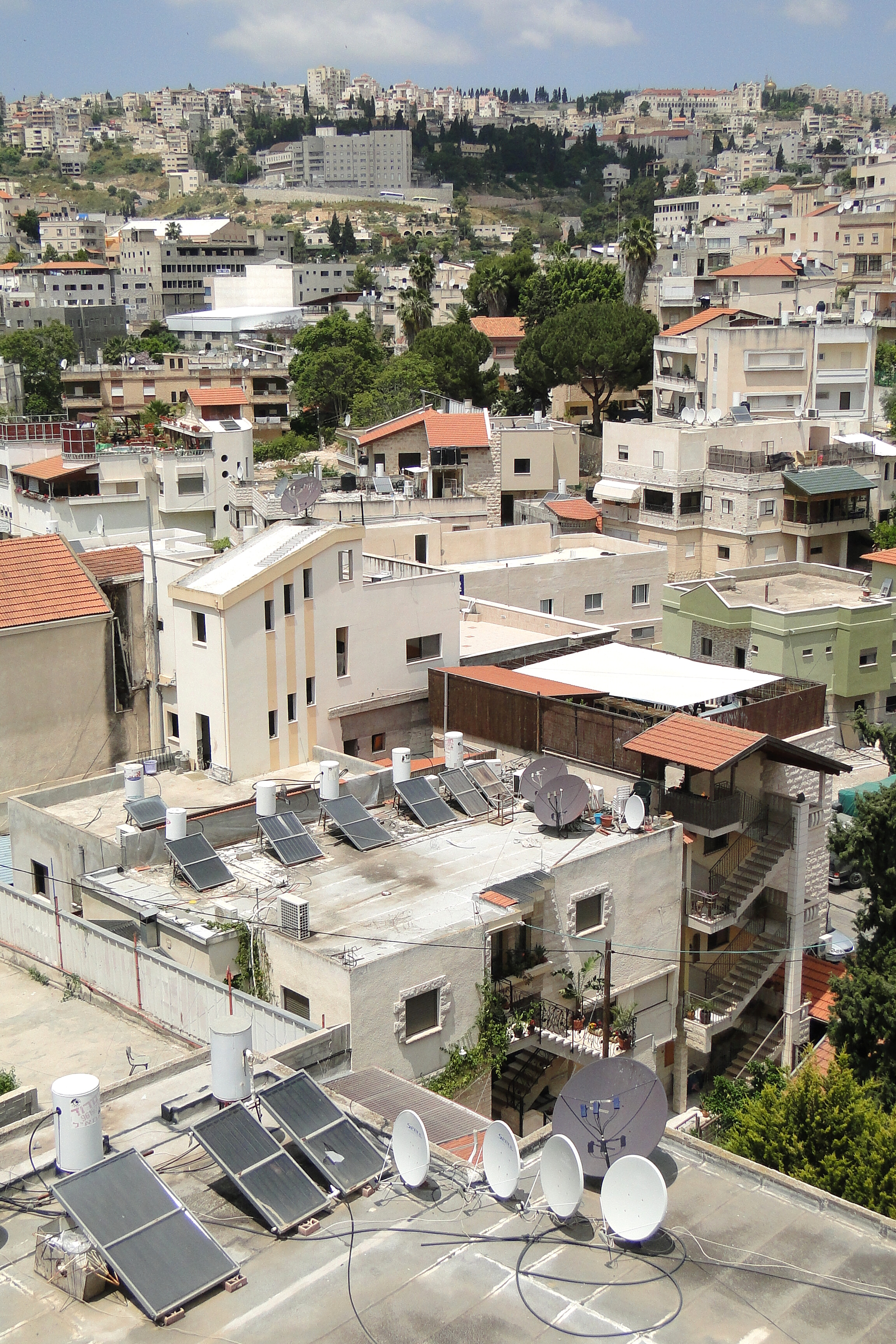
Solar panels on rooftops from Nazareth, Israel.

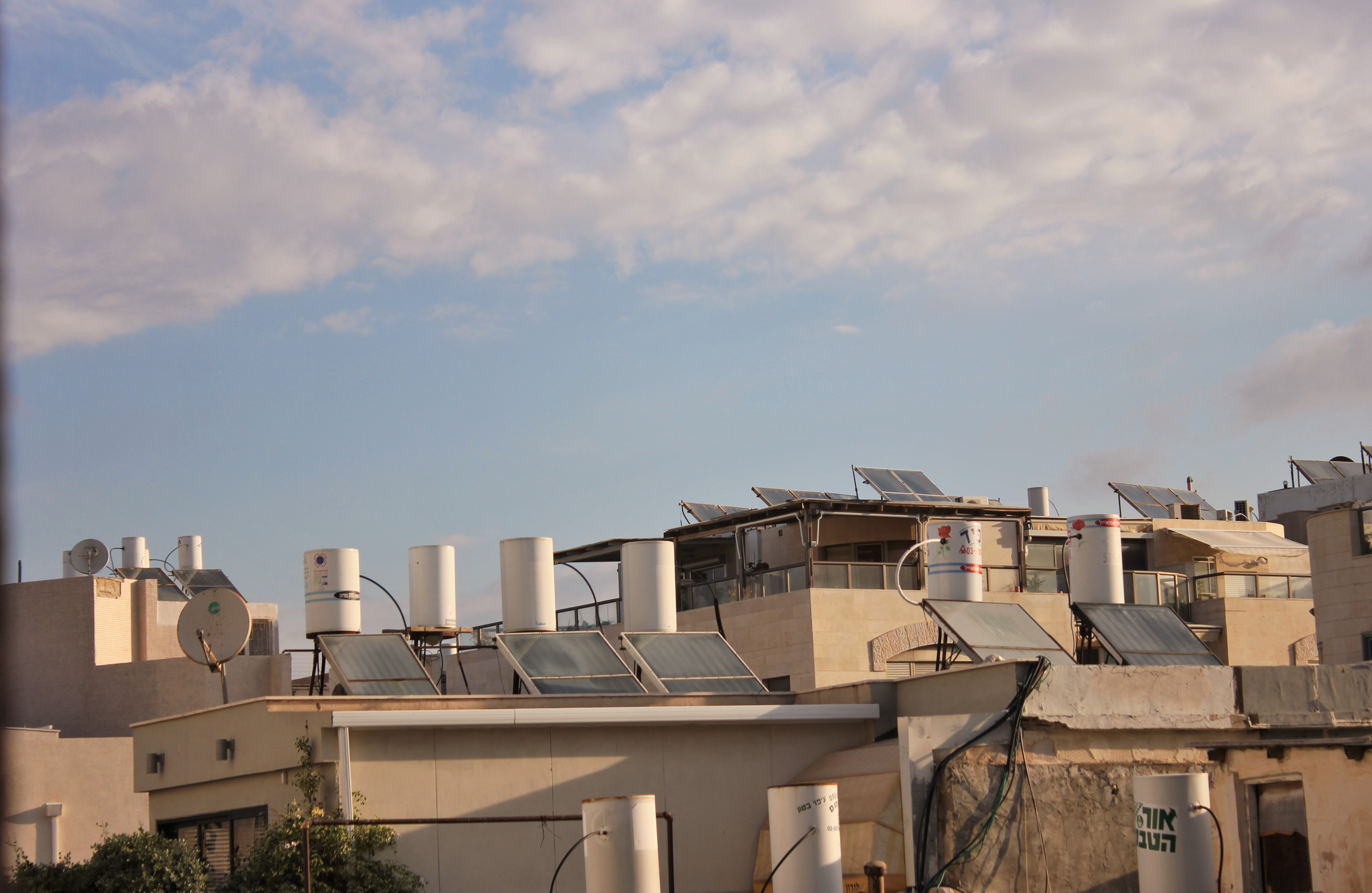
Solar water heaters and solar panels on roofs from Tel Aviv-Yafo.

In the years 2023–2028, a carbon tax in Israel will be introduced in the form of carbon pricing. This plan will put a tax on 80% of emissions. This piece of legislation alone should reduce emissions by 67% by 2050. In January 2024 a policy proposal for a carbon tax and a travel tax were introduced as part of the budget for the year 2024. However, as of March 2024, it had not been put into practice, while some of the other targets had been stalled as well. The carbon tax policy was finally adopted by September 2024.

== See also ==
- Environmental issues in Israel
- Plug-in electric vehicles in Israel
- Climate change in the Middle East and North Africa
