= 2013 Israeli municipal elections =

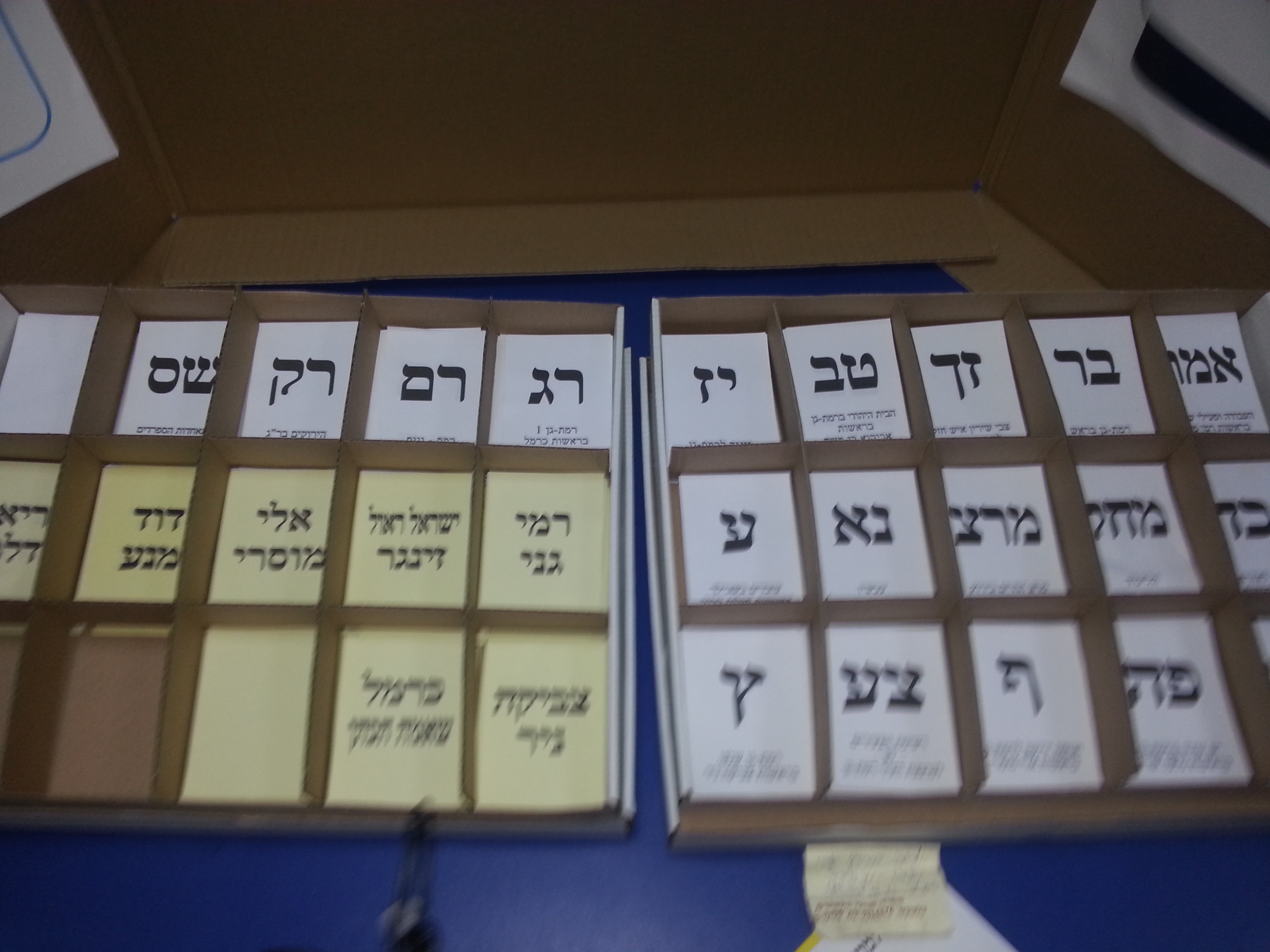
Municipal election ballot papers in Ramat Gan

The 2013 Municipal elections in Israel were held on 22 October 2013. Turnout was low, with only 43% of those eligible voting, compared to 51% in 2008.

In Jerusalem, the incumbent Nir Barkat won re-election with 52% against challenger Moshe Lion, who gained 45%, as did Tel Aviv's Mayor, Ron Huldai, who won re-election against Member of the Knesset Nitzan Horowitz from the Meretz Party.

== See also ==
- 2013 Haifa mayoral election
- 2013 Jerusalem mayoral election
- 2013 Tel Aviv mayoral election
