= 2019 Meretz leadership election =

| ← 2018 | 27 June 2019 | 2022 → |

~1,000 party conference members simple majority of votes needed to win
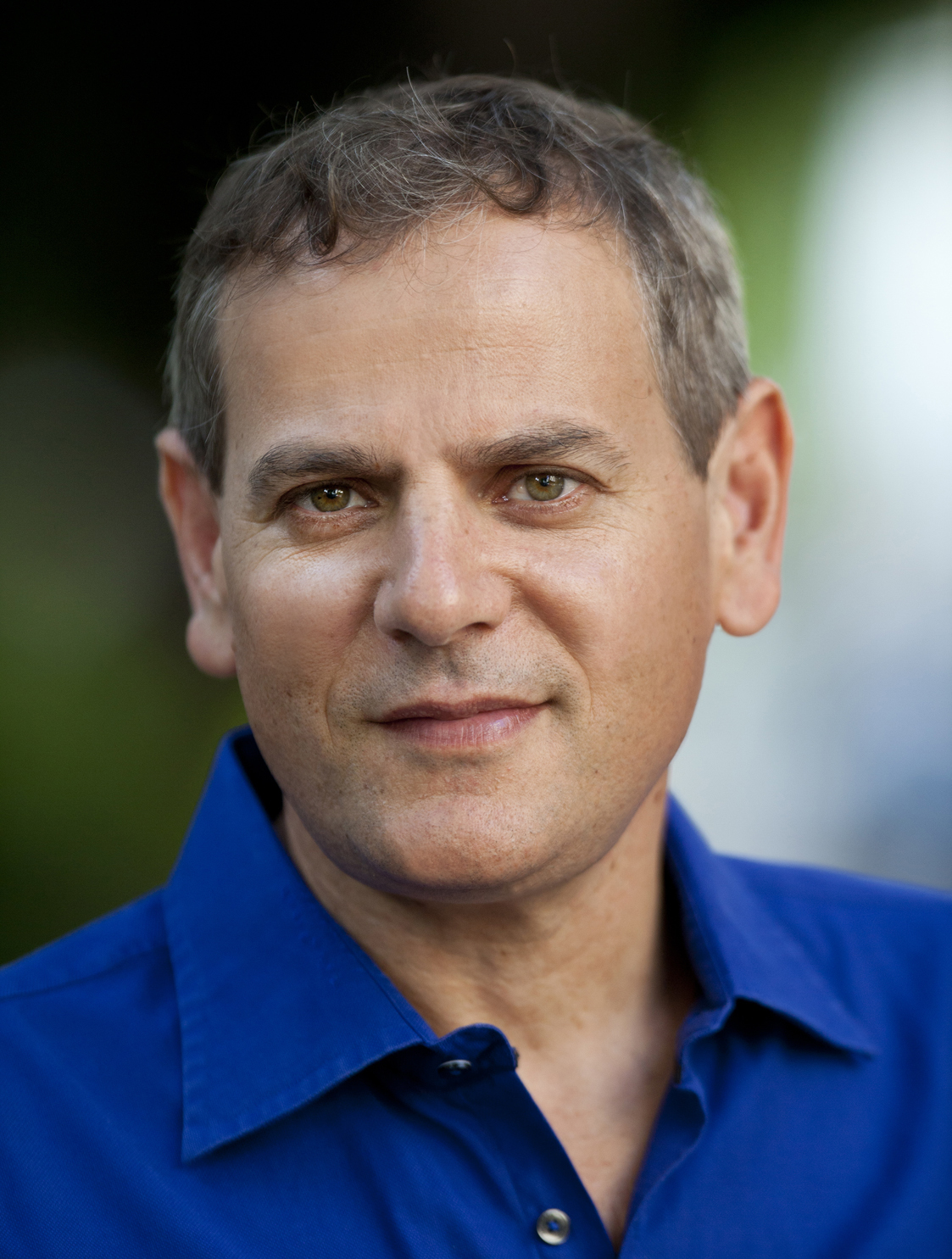

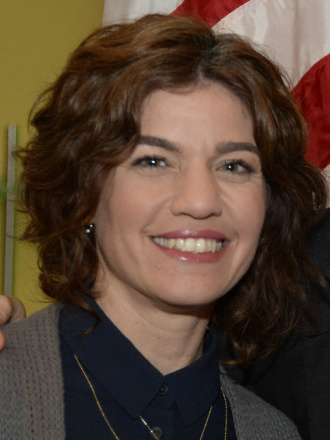
| Candidate | Nitzan Horowitz | Tamar Zandberg |
| Party | Meretz | Meretz |
| Popular vote | 459 | 383 |
| Percentage | 54.51% | 45.49% |
Meretz leader before election
Tamar Zandberg
Meretz leader
Nitzan Horowitz

An election was held for the leadership of the Meretz party on 27 June 2019 at the party's conference. Nitzan Horowitz unseated incumbent leader Tamar Zandberg.

By winning the election, Horowitz became the first openly gay individual to ever lead a party in Israel's Knesset.

== Background ==
Per the rules of the party, if a second Knesset election is held during the term of the party's chairman, the party conference will choose a forum in which they will then hold another leadership election, as well as primaries to select its party list candidates. The election took place ahead of an upcoming legislative election in September. The conference decided to hold the primary internally, with its members voting on candidates.

Unlike in the last leadership election the party had held, in 2019, the vote was only open to the roughly 1,000 members of the party conference.

== Results ==
2019 Meretz leadership election
| Party | Candidate | Votes | % |
|---|---|---|---|
| Meretz | Nitzan Horowitz | 459 | 54.51 |
| Meretz | Tamar Zandberg (incumbent) | 383 | 45.49 |
| Total votes | | 842 | 100 |
