= Ministry of Environmental Protection (Israel) =

Government ministry of Israel

- המשרד להגנת הסביבה

Agency overview
- Formed: 1988
- Jurisdiction: Government of Israel
- Minister responsible: Idit Silman
- Website: www.sviva.gov.il

The Ministry of Environmental Protection (Hebrew: המשרד להגנת הסביבה, HaMisrad LeHaganat HaSviva; Arabic: وزارة حماية البيئة) is a government ministry in Israel. It was formerly known as the Ministry of the Environment (Hebrew: המשרד לאיכות הסביבה, HaMisrad LeEikhut HaSviva).

The ministry operates on three levels: national, regional and local: At the national level it is responsible for the formulation of a nationwide integrated, and inclusive policy for the protection of the environment. At the regional level, through its six districts, the ministry, among others, oversees the implementation of the national environmental policy, engages in local planning processes, assists municipalities with their environmental responsibilities and supervise them when formulating requirements for the acquisition of business licenses. At the local level the ministry lends support to environmental units and towns associations that have been established in municipalities throughout the country.

Climate Change is a major area in which the ministry operates. The prime objective of the ministry in this area is to reduce the emissions of greenhouse gases (GHG) from all sources in the Israeli economy. In the run-up to the UNFCCC convention in Paris in 2015 the ministry has led an inter-ministerial committee that examined a range of GHG emissions reduction targets for 2030 and formulated the strategy for meeting these targets. The ministry is also responsible for preparing and submitting Israel's different Climate Change reports to the UNFCCC. The ministry focuses its activities on policies and measures to promote renewable energy, switch from coal to natural gas in the power sector and to ramp up the implementation of energy efficiency measures across the economy.

A basic volunteer for the ministry is called a "Ne'eman Nikayon", translated literally as a "clean trustee" but more accurately described as a volunteer cleanliness protection officer. They are certified under the "Cleanliness protection law of 1984". A volunteer must pass a one-day course where they learn the basic laws involved in their ability to report violations of Israeli littering laws. Once certified, a volunteer can write out tickets against violators and submit them directly to the ministry for processing. In almost all cases, a simple fine is issued (ranging from 250–8000 Israeli new sheqels). Under some circumstances, such as a repeat offender, the case may be automatically sent to a judge, to determine special punishment.

The environmental protection ministry has paid inspectors (Pakachim) who serve in a similar capacity as a basic volunteer, as well as holding additional powers according to Israeli law.

== List of ministers ==
The Environmental Protection Minister of Israel (Hebrew: שר להגנת הסביבה, Sar LeHaganat HaSviva) is the political head of the ministry. The post was created on 22 December 1988, and until May 2006 was known as the Minister of the Environment (Hebrew: שר לאיכות הסביבה, Sar LeEikhut HaSviva). There have been Deputy Ministers on multiple occasions.

#	Minister	Party	Government	Term start	Term end	Notes
Minister of the Environment
1	Roni Milo	Likud	23	22 December 1988	7 March 1990	
2	Rafael Edri	Alignment	23	7 March 1990	15 March 1990	
3	Yitzhak Shamir	Likud	24	11 June 1990	13 July 1992	Serving Prime Minister
4	Ora Namir	Labor Party	25	13 July 1992	31 December 1992	
5	Yossi Sarid	Meretz	25, 26	31 December 1992	18 June 1996	
6	Rafael Eitan	Tzomet	27	28 June 1996	6 July 1999	
7	Dalia Itzik	One Israel	28	6 July 1999	7 March 2001	
8	Tzachi Hanegbi	Likud	29	7 March 2001	28 February 2003	
9	Yehudit Naot	Shinui	30	28 February 2003	17 October 2004	
10	Ilan Shalgi	Shinui	30	29 November 2004	4 December 2004	Acting Minister
11	Shalom Simhon	Labor Party	30	10 January 2005	23 November 2005	
12	Gideon Ezra	Kadima	30	18 January 2006	4 May 2006	
Minister of Environmental Protection
–	Gideon Ezra	Kadima	31	4 May 2006	31 March 2009	
13	Gilad Erdan	Likud	32	31 March 2009	18 March 2013	
14	Amir Peretz	Hatnuah	33	18 March 2013	9 November 2014	
15	Avi Gabbay	Not an MK	34	14 May 2015	31 May 2016	Member of Kulanu
16	Moshe Kahlon	Kulanu	34	31 May 2016	1 August 2016	
17	Ze'ev Elkin	Likud	34	1 August 2016	17 May 2020	
18	Gila Gamliel	Likud	35	17 May 2020	13 June 2021	
19	Tamar Zandberg	Meretz	36	13 June 2021	29 December 2022	
20	Idit Silman	Likud	37	29 December 2022		

=== Deputy ministers ===
#	Minister	Party	Government	Term start	Term end
1	Yigal Bibi	National Religious Party	24	20 November 1990	13 July 1992
2	Ofir Akunis	Likud	33	9 December 2014	14 May 2015
3	Yaron Mazuz	Likud	34	2 August 2016	30 April 2019

== See also ==
- Climate change in Israel
- Environmental issues in Israel
