= 2013 Tel Aviv mayoral election =

- 22 October 2013
- Turnout: 28.7%
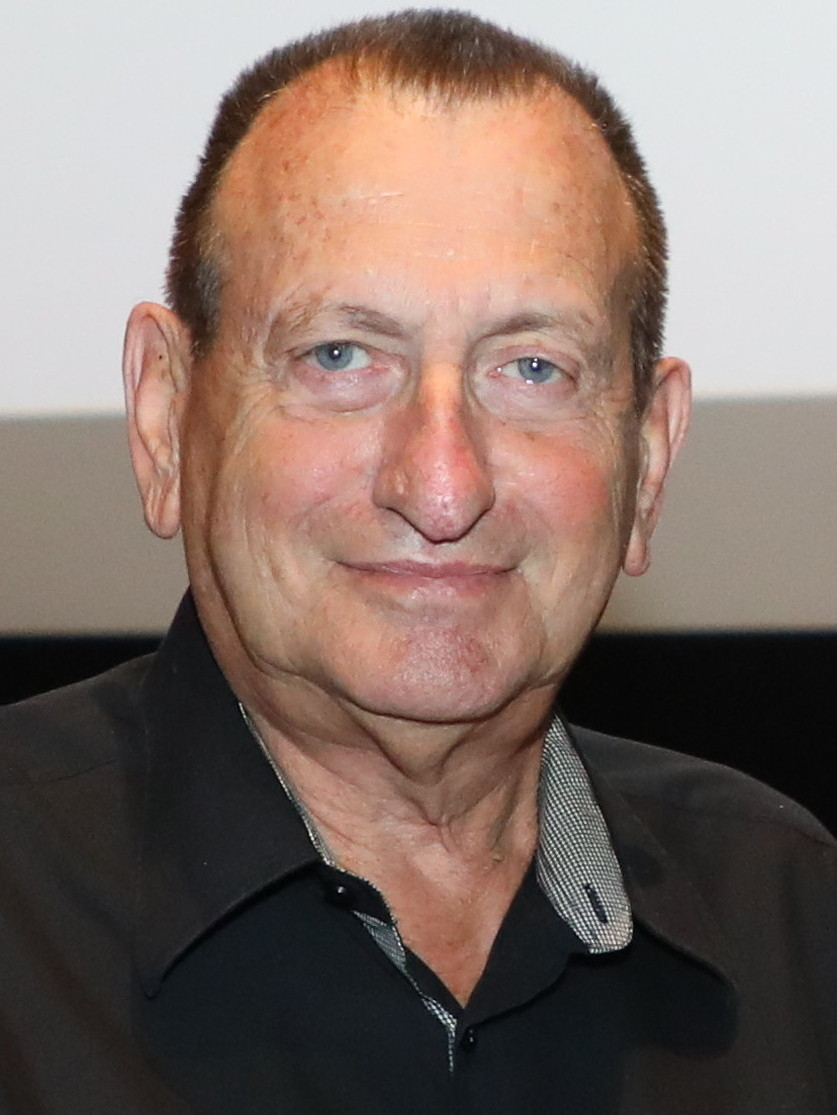

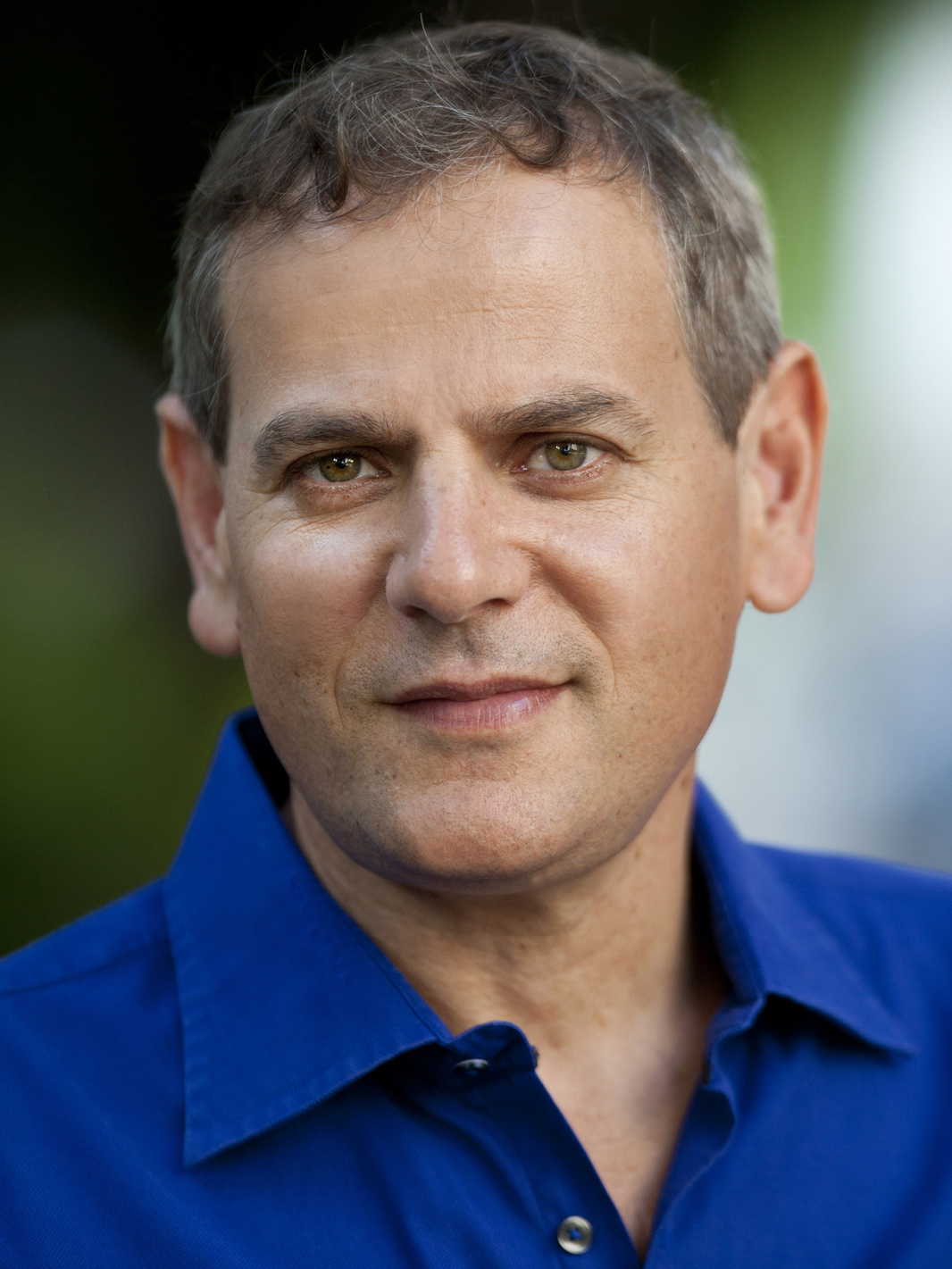

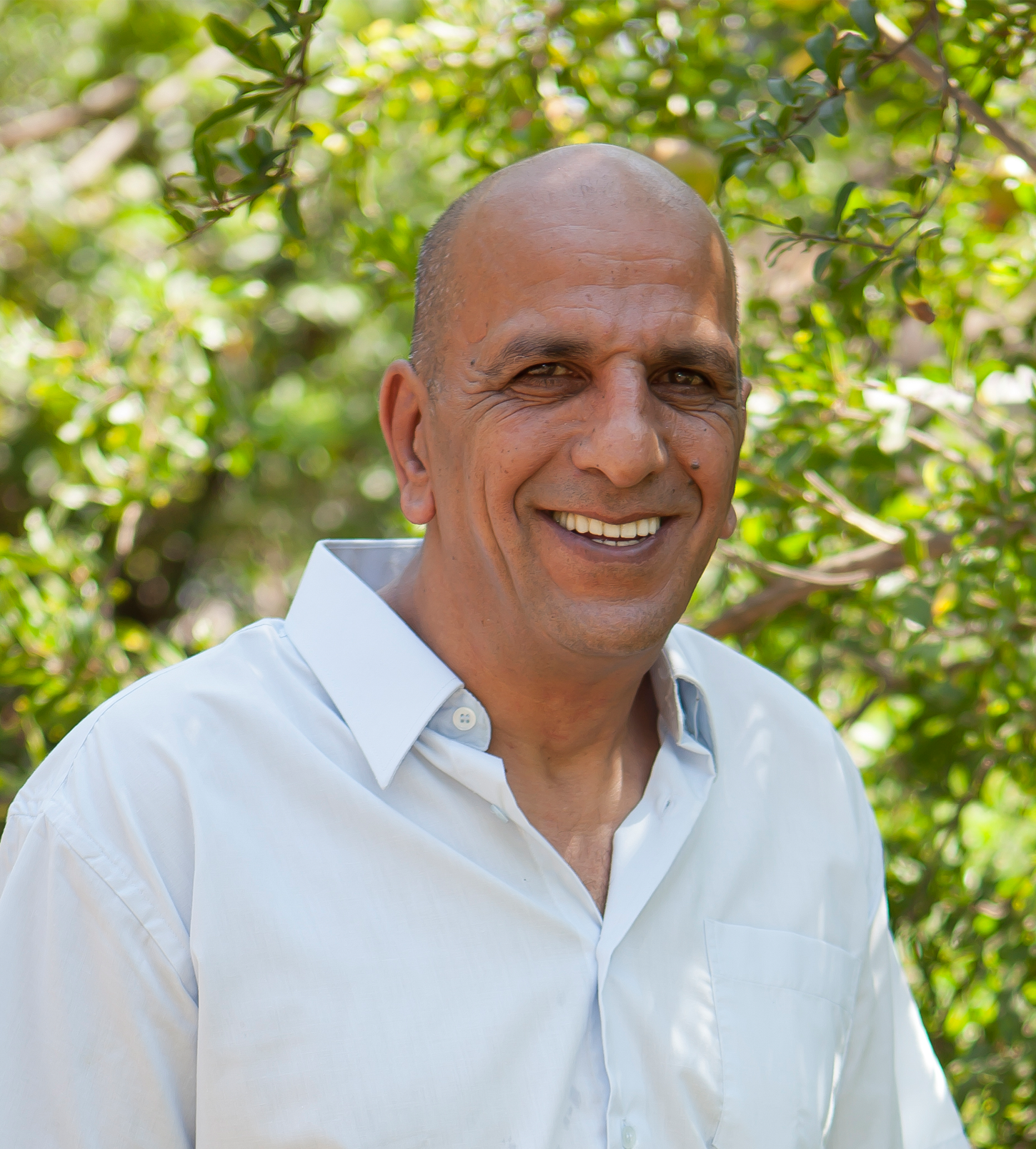
Candidate	Ron Huldai	Nitzan Horowitz	Aharon Maduel
Party	One Tel Aviv	Meretz	City for All
Popular vote	70,048	50,166	11,368
Percentage	53.24%	38.13%	8.64%
Mayor before election
Ron Huldai
One Tel Aviv
Elected mayor
Ron Huldai
One Tel Aviv

The 2013 Tel Aviv mayoral election was held on 22 October 2013 to elect the mayor of Tel Aviv. It saw the reelection of Ron Huldai to a fourth consecutive term.

The election was part of the 2013 Israeli municipal elections.

== Candidates ==
=== Ran ===
- Nitzan Horowitz (Meretz), member of the Knesset
- Ron Huldai (One Tel Aviv), incumbent mayor since 1998
- Aharon Maduel (City of All), city councilman

=== Declined ===
- Dov Khenin, member of the Knesset
- Daphni Leef, activist

== Campaigning ==
Huldai, a former member of the Israeli Labor Party turned independent politician, ran as the nominee of his own "One Tel Aviv" party, which also ran a party list for the coinciding city council election. In the past, the Labor Party had supported Huldai's slates for city council. In 2013, however, the Labor Party ran its own separate slate. The Labor Party supported Huldai in the mayoral race, however.

Horowitz ran as the nominee of the Meretz party. Horowitz was regarded as a popular member of the Knesset. His made campaign promises to remedy issues related to school overcrowding, public transportation, parking, as well as to give more attention to the southern part of the city.

If he had been elected, Horowitz, who was openly gay, would have been the first openly-gay mayor in the Middle East. Tel Aviv is regarded as a gay-friendly city. Huldai also positioned himself as an ally of the gay community.

The characteristic which was seen as most distinguishing Aharon Maduel, the nominee of the City of All ("Ir Lekulanu") party, in the race was his status as a Sephardi Jew. Yitzhak Laor wrote a piece in Haaretz endorsing Maduel as who he believed would be the best choice for the city's left-wing to vote for. Maduel, however, was seen by some as splitting the vote of the city's more left-wing voters, harming the prospects of Horowitz.

The race partially focused on discontent among the middle class. Horowitz attempted to capitalize off of these sentiments by criticizing Huldai as having focused on enhancing the lives of the wealthy, while ignoring the needs of poor and middle class residents.

Huldai focused his campaign on his effort, taking credit for elevating the city as an international tourism destination, as well as claiming credit for elevating the vibrancy of the city. He also heavily touted the city's popular bike sharing program and the expansion of the city's bike lanes, both implemented by his administration.

Huldai was seen as a strong front-runner in the election. Nonetheless, Horowitz was seen as a somewhat strong challenger. Maduel was far behind the other two candidates in all polling.

== Polling ==
Date	Poll source	Sample size	Margin of error	Nitzan Horowitz	Ron Huldai	Aharon Maduel	Undecided
October 2013	Magar Mochot/Maariv			14%	40%		46%
October 2013	Meretz			38%	45%	5%	
October 2013	Huldai campaign			27%	46%		
October 2013				26%	53%		
March 2013	Dialogue (for Meretz)			33%	50%		17%

== Results ==
Turnout was 28.7%.

Nitzan Horowitz carried some parts of the city center and the city's old north. Aharon Maduel carried the southern portions of Jaffa.

2013 Tel Aviv mayoral elections results
Candidate	Party	Votes	%
Ron Huldai (incumbent)	One Tel Aviv	70,048	53.24
Nitzan Horowitz	Meretz	50,166	38.13
Aharon Maduel	City of All	11,368	8.64
Total		131,582	100
