= Michal Rozin =

Israeli politician (born 1969)

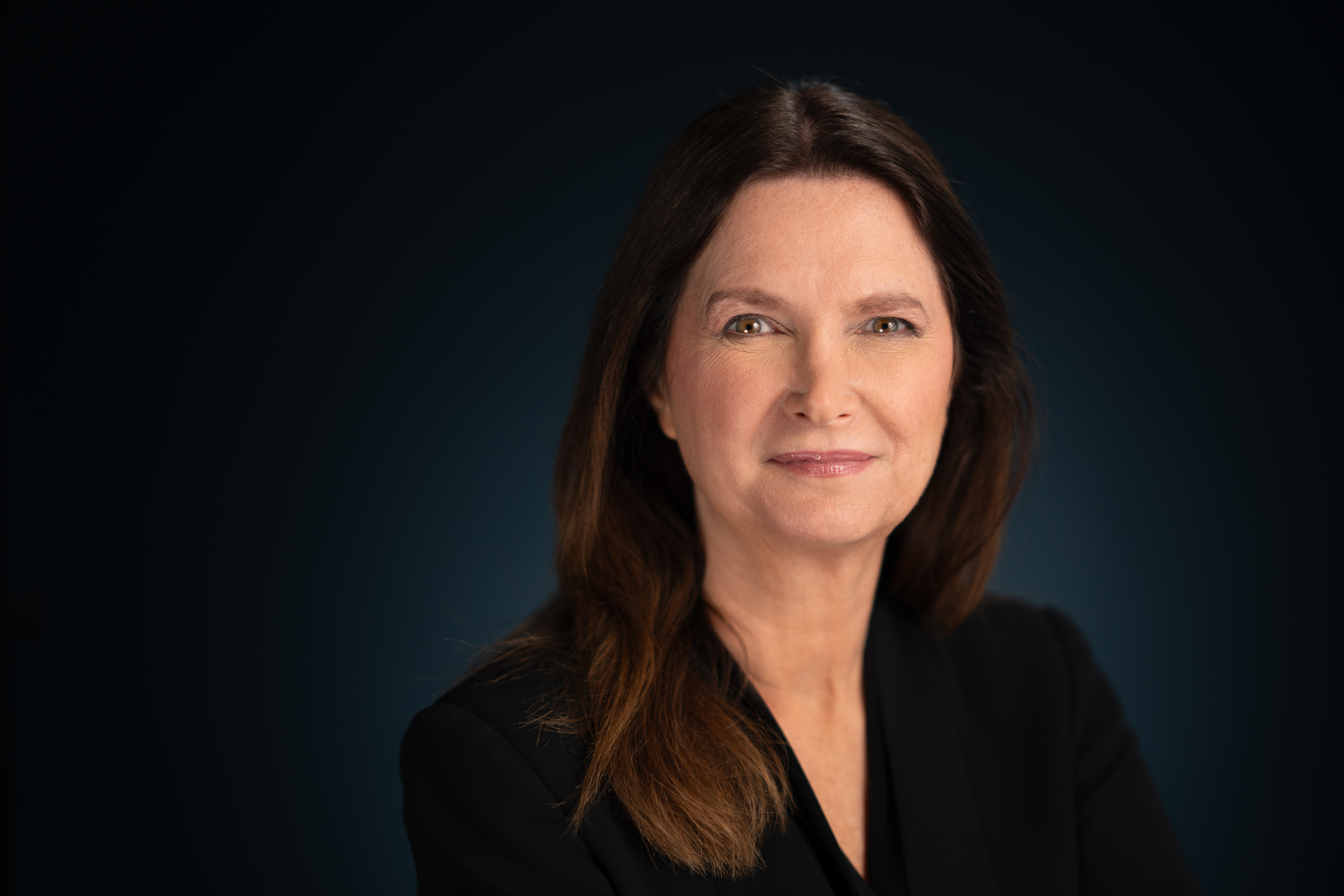
- Rozin in 2026

Faction represented in the Knesset
- 2013–2019: Meretz
- 2021–2022: Meretz
- 2026–: The Democrats

Personal details
- Born: 25 June 1969 (age 57) Ramat Gan, Israel

Michal Rozin (Hebrew: מיכל רוזין; born 25 June 1969) is an Israeli politician who has served as a member of the Knesset for Democrats since 2026 and was previously an MK for Meretz from 2013 to 2019 and from 2021 until 2022.

== Political career ==
Rozin was elected to the Knesset in 2013 on the Meretz list. During her first term in the Knesset she chaired the Committee on Foreign Workers, and headed three lobbies; the Lobby for Equality in Employment, the Lobby for Female Knesset Members, and the Lobby for Equality and Pluralism.

She is a member of the Women of the Wall, and says she subscribes to a worldview combining religious freedom with feminism. On 4 March 2014, she and Amram Mitzna were awarded the Israel Democracy Institute's Outstanding Parliamentarian Award of 2013. The award was given in recognition for her work promoting the rights of women, children, and disadvantaged groups.

In January 2015, Rozin conducted mock gay weddings outside the headquarters of the Jewish Home party to protest its opposition to same-sex marriage. She was also ranked third on Aguda's ranking of LGBT rights advocates in the Knesset, behind only fellow Meretz MKs Nitzan Horowitz and Tamar Zandberg. She was re-elected in the 2015 Knesset elections after being placed fourth on the party's list, and in the April 2019 elections in third place. In the 2022 Israeli legislative election, she was placed third on the Meretz list, but was not re-elected to the Knesset after Meretz failed to cross the electoral threshold

In The Democrats primary elections held on 20 July 2026, ahead of the 2026 Israeli legislative election, Rozin came in at number eight on the slate. She was elected to the Knesset as the party won eight seats.
