= Anat Nir =

Israeli businessperson and LGBT rights activist

- ענת ניר
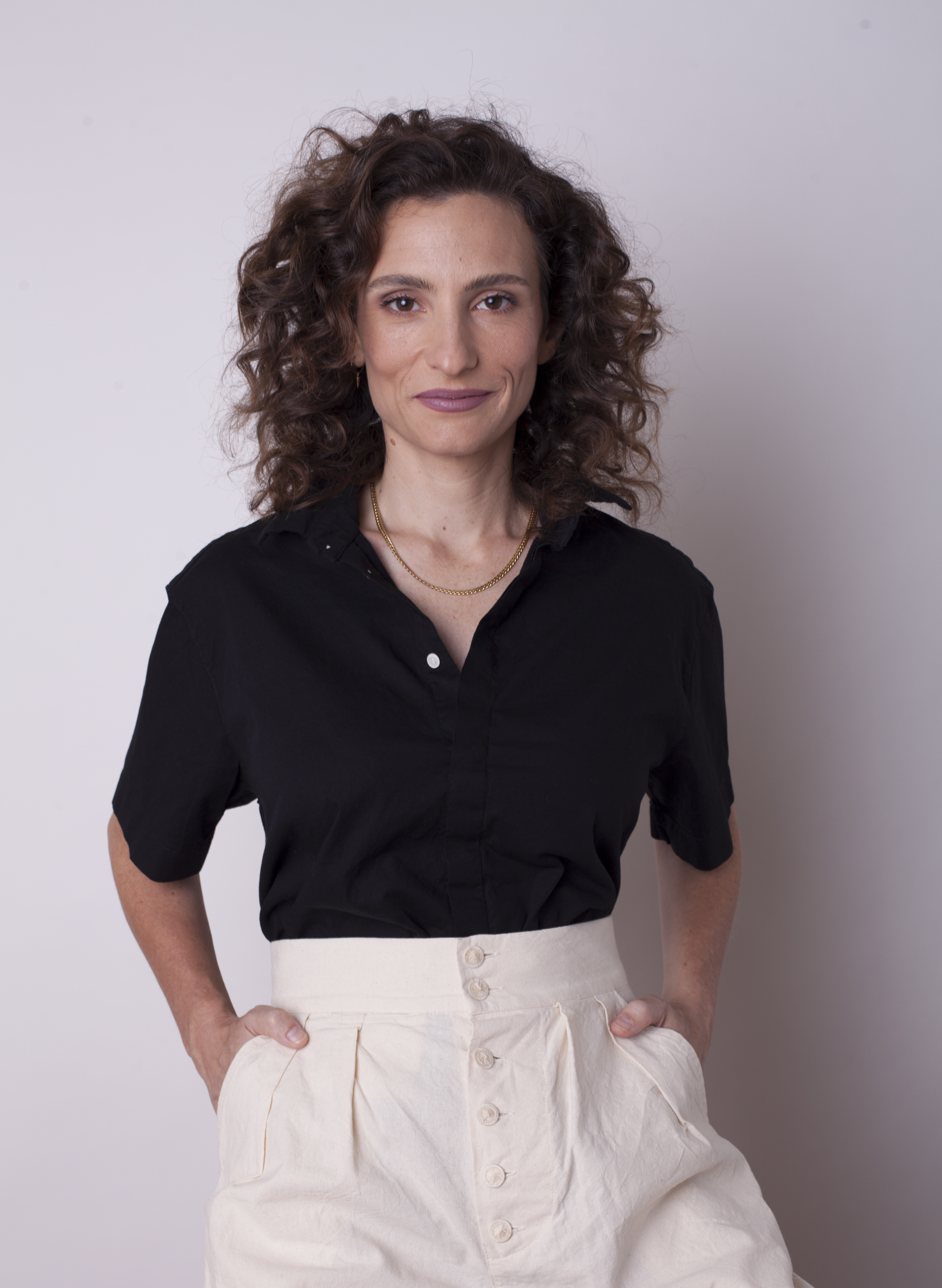
- Born: Ganei Yehuda, Israel
- Education: MA Gender and Peacebuilding, University for Peace
- Occupation: Businessperson
- Known for: LGBT activism
- Political party: Meretz
- Mother: Lili Nir

Anat Nir (Hebrew: ענת ניר; born November 3, 1979) is an Israeli businessperson and LGBT rights activist.

== Early life ==
Nir was born in Ganei Yehuda into a tumultuous family. Her parents separated when she was eight years old and divorced ten years later. Nir and her two sisters and brothers were raised by their mother, psychologist and organizational consultant Lili Nir.

== Career ==
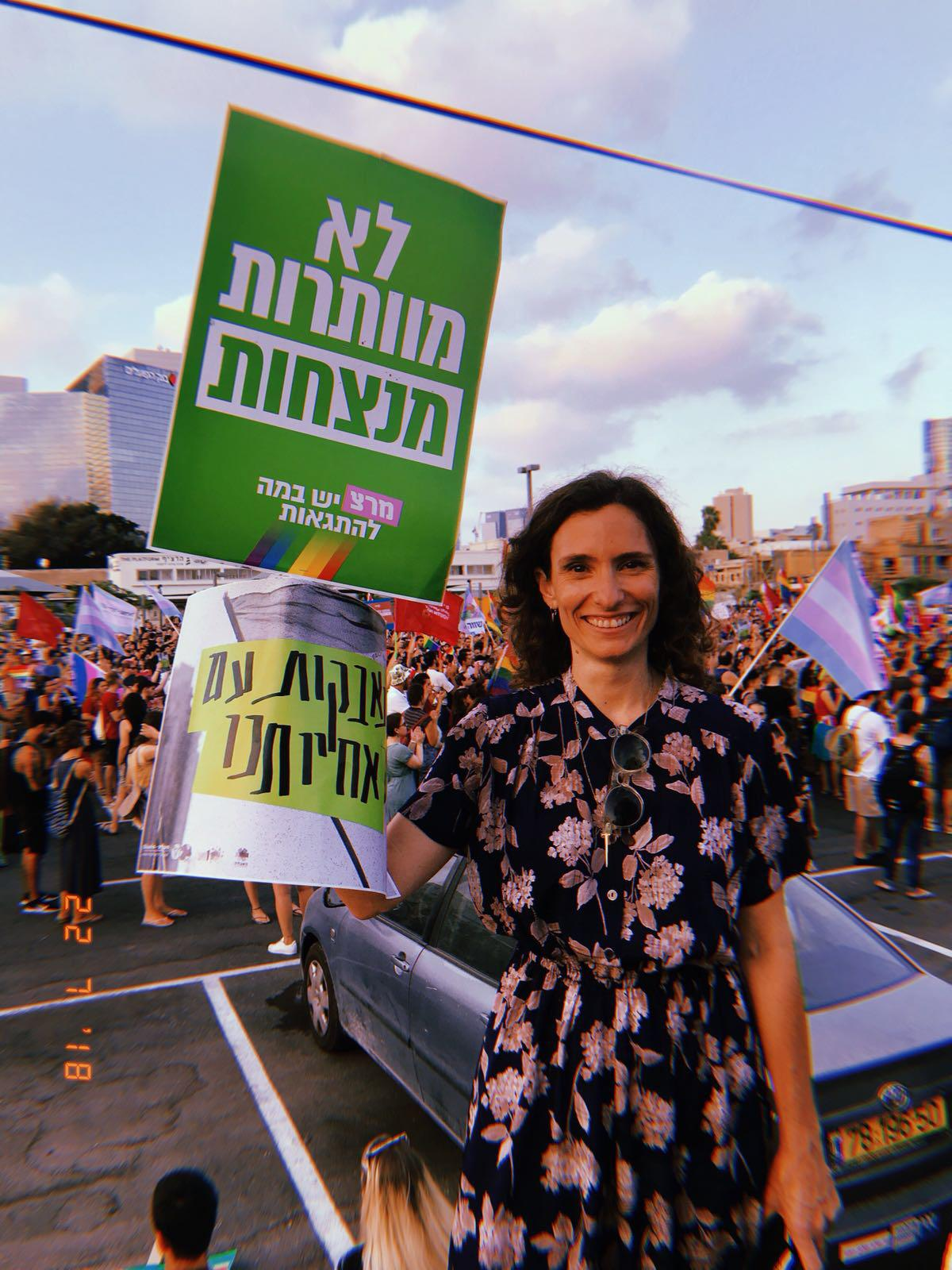
Nir at the 2018 Israeli LGBT's strike.

At the age of 20, Nir founded the first lesbian bar in Tel Aviv on Lilienblum Street. She is a marketing manager for Moovz, an LGBT social network. Nir is business partners with Dana Ziv. They founded the party brand, "Dana and Anat".

Nir produced the first gay pride parade in Beersheba. In 2008, Nir and Ziv founded and produced the film festival, Lethal Lesbian. In 2009, Nir was one of the leaders of the Tel Aviv municipality's campaign to increase LGBT tourism. She served on the city's LGBT Association to promote women's inclusion in gay pride events. Nir and Ziv organized the Tel Aviv Pride central stage and have served on the planning committee. In 2008, they were the first women to drive a float in the parade. By 2016, half of the floats were driven by women.

Nir serves as chair of the board of directors for Feminanci - Finance College For Women.

A member of the Meretz party, in 2022 Nir unsuccessfully campaigned for a position on its electoral list for the Knesset.

== Personal life ==
Nir is bisexual and identifies with lesbian culture.
