= Lethal Lesbian =

LGBTQ film festival in Israel

Lethal Lesbian לסבית קטלנית
- Location: Tel Aviv, Israel
- Established: 2008
- Founded by: Anat Nir, Dana Ziv
- Artistic director: Lior Elefant

Lethal Lesbian (Hebrew: לסבית קטלנית) is Israel's only lesbian film festival. The festival has been held annually since 2008, and screens independent short, documentary and feature films from Israel and abroad.

== The festival ==
Lethal Lesbian was co-founded by LGBT activists Anat Nir and Dana Ziv, who organize and produce the festival with feminist Lior Elefant, its artistic director. The event began as screenings of lesbian-themed independent films, organized by friends of Ziv and Nir. The evenings were so successful, that the need for a festival in this niche seemed clear to the two founders.

The goal of Lethal Lesbian is to promote lesbian filmmaking of all types. It screens short and full-length films of all genres, and in some years, produces a concurrent exhibition of women's art. Though occasionally films by straight women (and one man) have been included in the festival line-up, the majority are by lesbian and bisexual women.

Every year Lethal Lesbian has a theme, and a short promotional movie is produced. These promos have become very popular online. In its first years, the festival took place in various venues, though in recent years, as it has grown to sold-out crowds, the Tel Aviv Cinematheque has become its home.

In 2018, as Lethal Lesbian celebrated a decade of queer women's film, the mainstream press lauded its staying power "in a landscape in which cultural events have trouble maintaining stability over time". The festival is one of only few events aimed specifically at women in the LGBT community, and has provided a supportive venue for the works of lesbian filmmakers.

== See also ==
- List of women's film festivals
- Women's cinema
- List of LGBT film festivals
- TLVFest
