= Environmental issues in Israel =

Israel's location

The State of Israel is one of the smallest countries in the world, at around 20,000 sq. km, and has relatively few natural resources. Due to its limited space, semi-arid climate, high population growth and resource scarcity, Israel is highly susceptible to environmental crises. These include water shortages and pollution, shrinking of the Dead Sea, waste production and disposal, air pollution and population density. As a result, resource development, in particular water, has benefited from relatively high government support throughout most of the country's history. For example, Israel's water conservation and reclamation infrastructure is one of the most advanced in the world, with approximately half its water supply derived from reclaimed and treated waste water, brackish water and desalinated water.

Additionally, Israel is party to several international agreements regarding air pollution and climate change, including the Kyoto Protocol, the UN Framework Convention on Climate Change and Montreal Protocol. Despite having taken these steps, Israel's environment continues to suffer as a rapidly growing population and standard of living contributes to increasing Green House Gas emissions and air pollutants, reductions in natural and open spaces via urbanization, over-pumping of water sources beyond their replenishment rates and deterioration of water used for drinking and irrigation.

== Geography and climate ==
Israel map of Köppen climate classification

The State of Israel is a Middle Eastern country located along the eastern edge of the Mediterranean Sea and the Northern border of the world's largest desert belt. Israel has a semi-arid climate, with lengthy summers and short winters. According to the Köppen-Geiger climate classification system Israel is composed of three climate zones. Areas on the Mediterranean coast are classified as "dry-summer subtropical", (Csa), and experience both the hottest and coldest months of the year. Closer inland Israel transitions into a dry semi-arid climate (Bsh), with an average temperature of 18 C. Southern Israel is classified as a “hot desert climate” (Bwh) and receives an average of 50mm to 200mm of rainfall annually. Rainfall is relatively higher in the North, where approximately 78%, around 1,100mm, of the country's precipitation occurs annually.

== Environmental movement ==
While development in Israel has always been prioritized, environmental protection has not always received adequate attention by the government, resulting in the growth of a robust domestic environmental movement. The number of environmental NGOs has increased significantly in recent decades; currently there are over 100 registered organizations pursuing environmental campaigns with varying degrees of success. According to environmental activist Alon Tal, despite the dramatic increase in number of Israeli environmental movements since the 1990s, their organizations lack efficiency and effectiveness due to narrow agendas, limited sources of funding and a lack of professional capabilities. Although there is high ideological homogeneity among the environmental NGOs, their lack of efficiency in addressing environmental issues has hampered efforts to prevent an escalation in Israel's environmental problems.

== Contemporary issues ==
=== Air pollution ===
According to a 2002 study by the Israeli Journal of chemistry, Israel's efforts to minimize the effects of chemical pollution and improve environmental quality have proven less effective than those of the EU and other countries.

Due to substantial growth in vehicle use and emissions from power plants, the presence of Nitrogen Oxides (NOx) and Sulfur Oxides (SOx) in the air near Israel's major urban centers have increased significantly between 1980 and 2002. Nitrogen oxides doubled twice during these years, CO_{2} increased by 190%, and incidents of respiratory illness among children increased from 5%-17%.

=== Climate change ===
On 22 November 2016 Israel ratified the Paris Agreement. The country is part of 3 initiatives in mitigation and adaptation and 16 other action taken by non governmental actors.

According to the INDS of Israel, the main mitigation targets is to reduce per capita greenhouse gas emissions to 8.8 tCO2e by 2025 and to 7.7 tCO2e by 2030. Total emissions should be 81.65 MtCO2e in 2030. In business as usual scenario the emissions should be 105.5 MtCO2e by 2030 or 10.0 tCO2e per capita.

To reach it, the government of Israel wants to reduce the consumption of electricity by 17% relative to business as usual scenario, produce 17% of electricity from renewables and shift 20% of transportation from cars to public transport by 2030.

In an effort to comply with GHG emission reductions, Israel formed a committee with the goal of evaluating the country's potential to reduce emissions by the year 2030. Their findings have confirmed that Israel's power sector generates approximately half of the country's total GHG emissions. The second largest offender is the transport sector, which produces approximately 19% of total emissions.

Although greenhouse gas emissions have steadily risen from 1996 to 2007, as of 2010 concentrations of Nitrogen oxides and other pollutants have decreased around major traffic sites. Additionally, falling Sulfur oxide levels have been observed and attributed to more efficient fuel use in industrial power plants. However, despite the effects of technology in lowering per-capita emissions, rapid population growth and increased per-capita consumption have led to an overall decrease in air quality.

=== Forests ===
The created forests are the primary forests in Israel and consist primarily of a number of native and exotic Mediterranean conifers under an afforestation program, that began under the German Templar settlers in 1860s and continued to modern times. The Jewish National Fund (JNF) was founded in 1901, to buy land and encourage Jewish settlement, has planted over 240 million trees, built 180 dams, developed 100,000 hectares (1,000 km^{2}) of land and developed more than 1,000 parks. In 2006, the JNF signed a 49-year lease agreement with the State of Israel which gives it control over 30,000 hectares (300 km^{2}) of Negev land for the development of forests.

The JNF has been criticized by some for planting non-native pine trees which are unsuited to the climate, rather than local species such as olive trees. However, counter critics have claimed that the area would not be forested without the efforts of the JNF. Concern about the high concentration of single age, monocultural forests was seen in the 1970s as the forests had a high level of susceptibility to potential destruction by pests, disease, fire, drought and snow.

Israel had a 2018 Forest Landscape Integrity Index mean score of 4.14/10, ranking it 135th globally out of 172 countries.

==== Wildfires ====
In a 2016 study it was reported that wildfires were supposed to increase in Israel as a result of global warning and greater concentration of woody vegetation from afforestation. The same study found that the majority of the wildfires were smaller fires with some larger ones, with maps showing hotspots in the lower Galilee Mountains, the Jerusalem Mountains, near Modi'in and were spread between May and October.

=== Population density ===
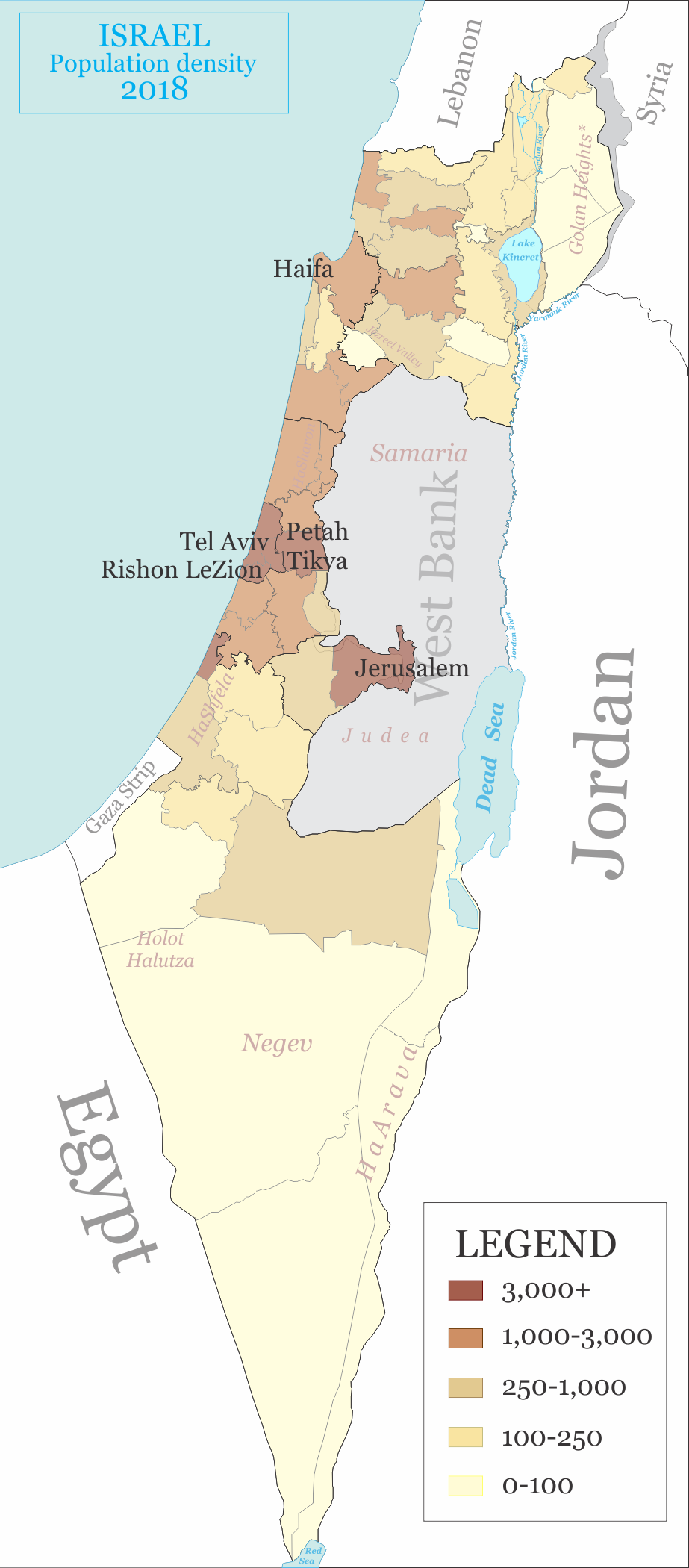
Israel population density 2018

Israel is one of the world's most densely populated countries, with most people living in the center and on the Mediterranean Coast. Israel's total population is approximately 8,463,400, with an annual growth rate of 2%. Some authors suggest this rapid population growth is a product of pro-natal/immigration policies pursued by the Israel government throughout its formative years. However, with little room to expand this rate of growth is putting unsustainable pressure on the environment in the form of increased consumption, transportation, destruction of natural spaces and waste production. On the Coastal Plain, rapid urbanization, pollution, the introduction of predatory weeds and habitat fragmentation have damaged or destroyed many natural spaces. Reduction in public beach space, and pollution along the coastlines of the Mediterranean and Red Sea have forced the Israeli government to pursue varied cleanup and inspection programs, including being party to the Mediterranean Action Plan. Additionally, air pollution has been exacerbated by population growth. Despite reductions in per-capita emissions from the transportation and industrial sectors, population growth has led to an overall increase in air pollution. According to a report by the Israeli Ministry of Environmental Protection, the pressure exerted by Israel's growing population needs to be reduced in order to prevent the loss of open spaces and ecological corridors near and between surface water bodies.

=== The Dead Sea ===
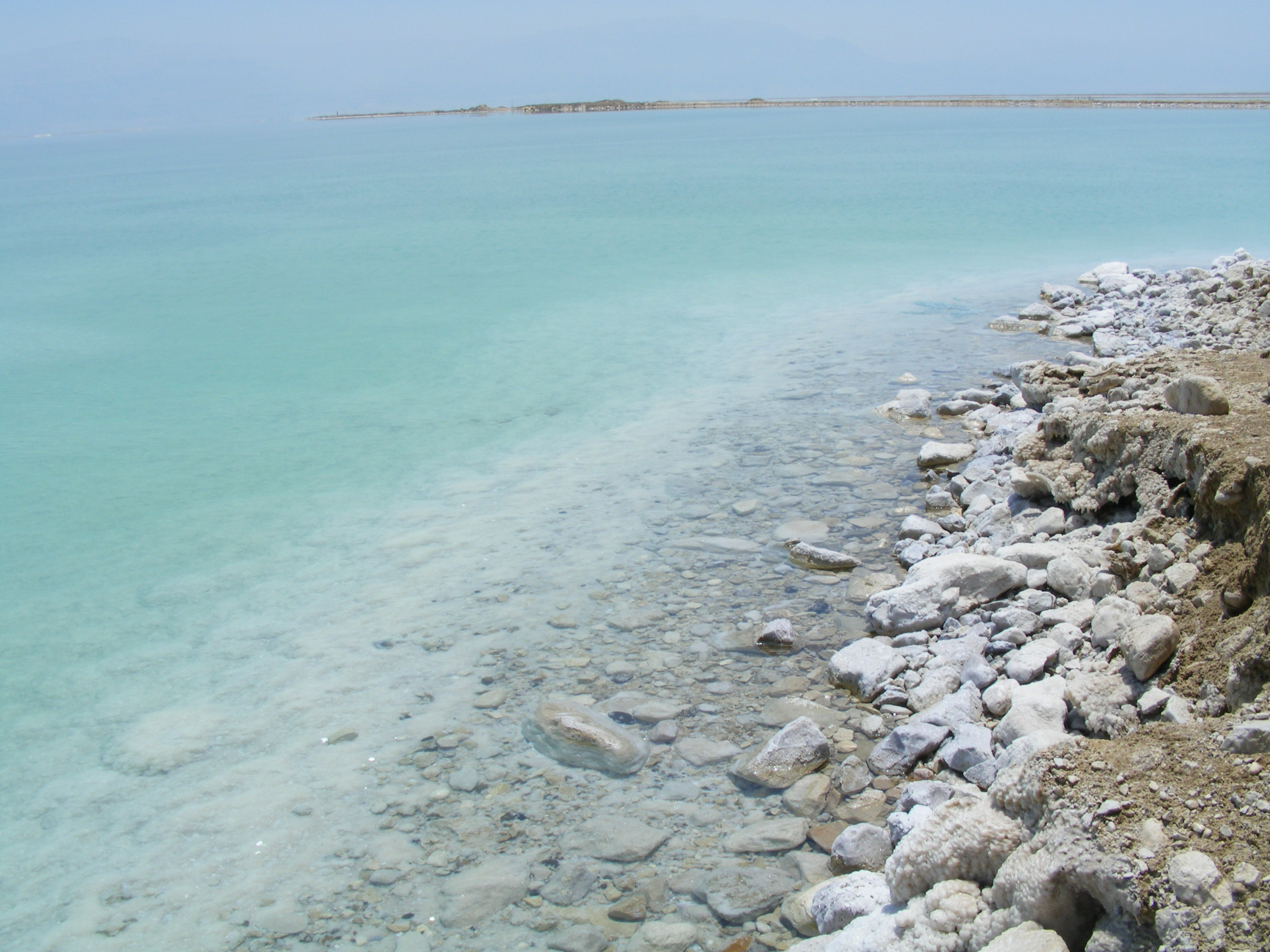
DeadSeaIsrael

In 2016, the DESERVE institute constructed a network of scientific monitoring stations around the Dead Sea, expanding our understanding of declining water levels, freshwater pollution, and the increased occurrence of sinkholes. Their findings have confirmed previous estimates of water level decline, by the Ministry of Environmental Protection, of approximately a meter a year. This is due, in part, to over pumping of surface water connected to the Jordan River, which leads directly into the Dead Sea. Additionally, the decline of the Dead Sea is correlated with increased sinkhole formation, although the mechanisms through which this occurs have not been confirmed. These sinkholes have caused significant damage to infrastructure and industry surrounding the Dead Sea region.

=== Water Management ===
Water scarcity and quality have been at the forefront of Israel's environmental concerns since the country's early years. Due to Israel's geographical variance in precipitation, a 130 km long pipeline known as the “National Water Carrier” was constructed in 1964. By the early 1990s the pipeline transported approximately half of Israel's drinking water. The country has managed to ensure the availability of clean drinking water for its citizens, but also to have a surplus of water that it sells to nearby nations like Jordan. Israel has been able to do this by utilizing desalination, reclaimed water, and other non-traditional water sources in addition to its natural supplies. Its 86m3 renewable yearly water per capita is far less than the 500m3 threshold that characterizes extreme shortage.

Israel pumps its water primarily from three sources, Lake Kinneret (Sea of Galilee), and the coastal and mountain aquifers. As of 2004, these three sources provided approximately 73% of Israel's drinking water. Israel utilizes almost all of its naturally replenishing water sources for municipal, agricultural and industrial purposes. Currently, Israeli water consumption exceeds the natural recharge rate by approximately 1 billion cubic meters per year (MCM/year). According to Israel's Ministry of Environmental Protection, overuse of Israel's water resources has negative effects on both wetlands and water ecosystems.

==== Surface water ====
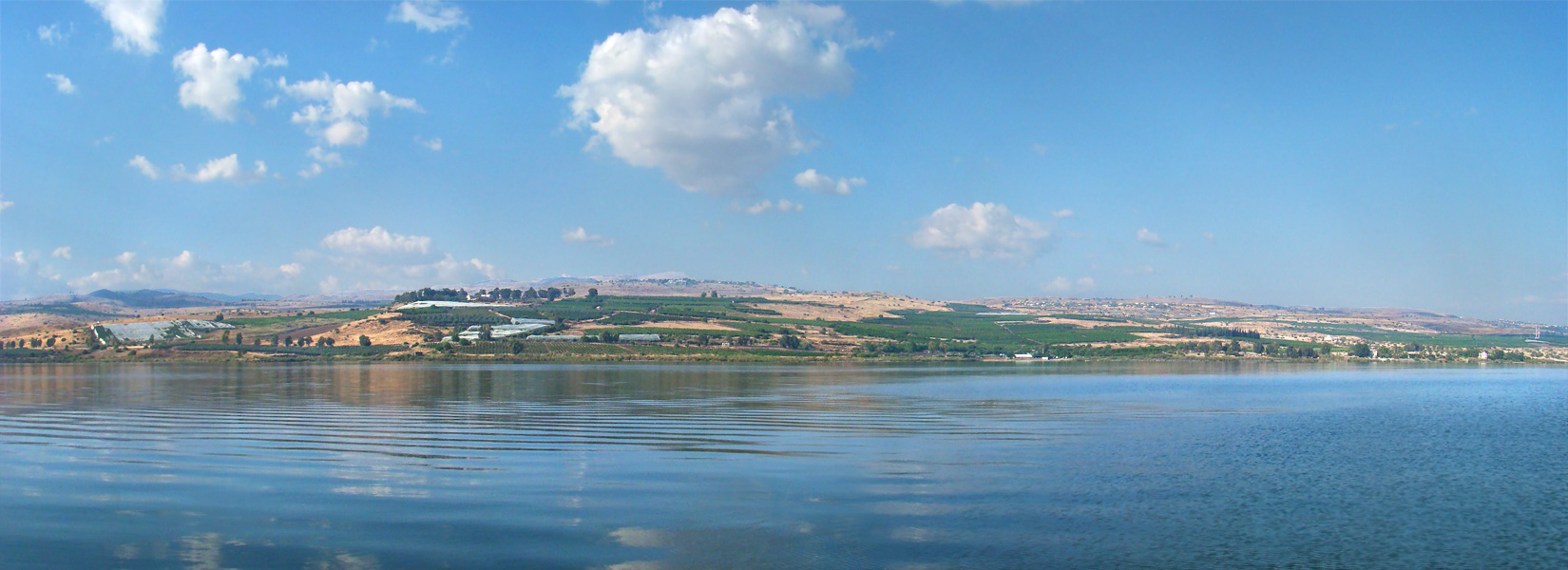
Sea of Galilee

Lake Kinneret is Israel's only freshwater reservoir and primary source of surface water. Kinneret provides water for use mainly in the South, where annual precipitation is relatively low compared to the North. It is also important as a source of recharge water for the Coastal and Mountain aquifers. Lake Kinneret suffers from a variable flow regime, whereby long periods of rain are followed by long periods of drought, leading to high variability in natural recharge rates. A study conducted in 2004 revealed that Increasing demand for water, even during years of drought, had led to a decline in the Lake's water level below the legal limit by approximately 2.5 meters. This decline has had negative effects on lakeshore facilities, and has increased the salinity of both the Jordan River and the Dead Sea.

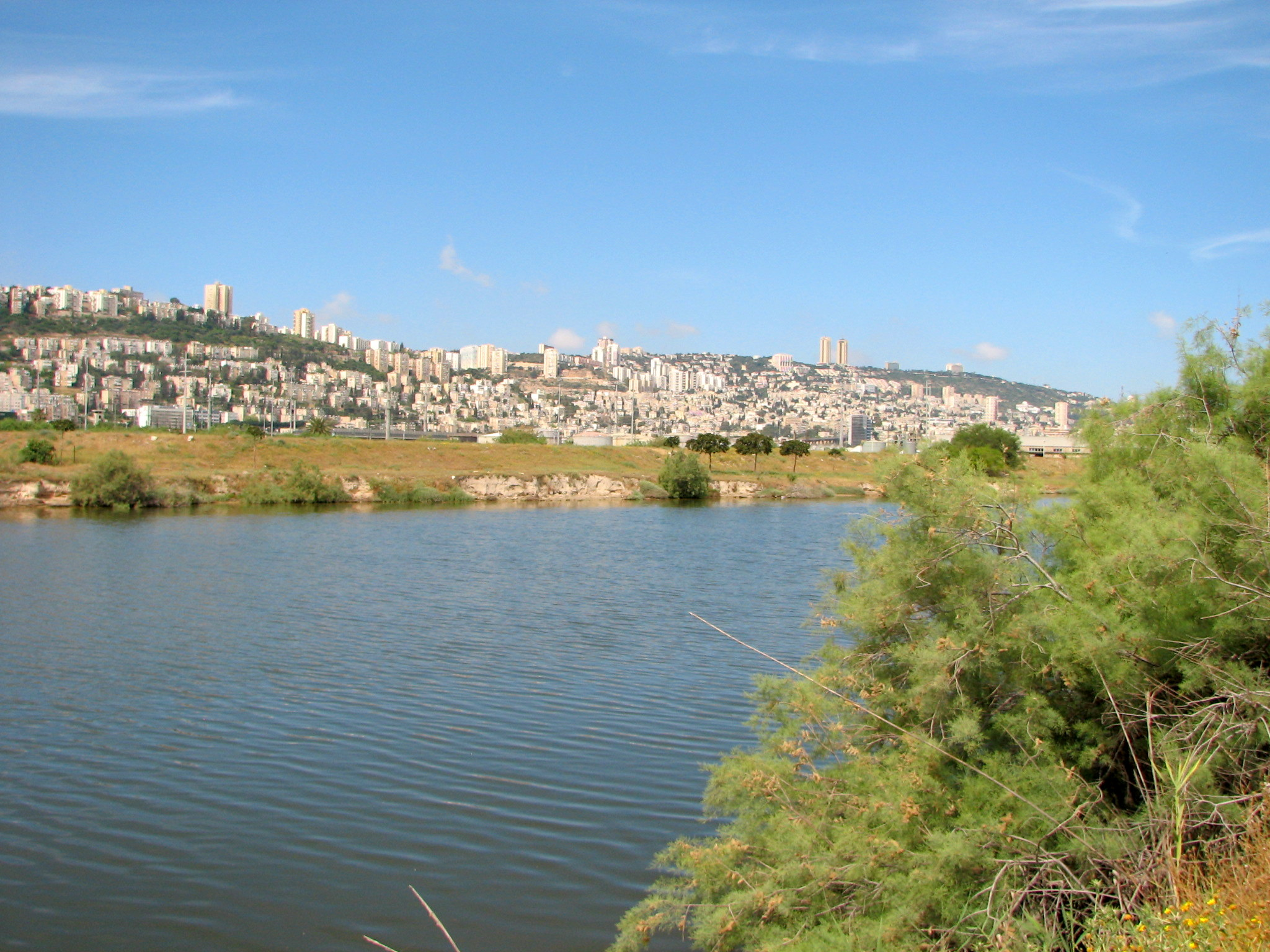
Park Kishon, Haifa 043

At the turn of the century, almost every major river in Israel had become significantly polluted due to many years of waste discharge from industrial and agricultural sources. One of the more famous examples is the pollution of Israel's third largest river, the Kishon River. In 1994, a study was conducted testing pollution in the Kishon at sources close to several industrial plants. Decades of dumping hazardous effluents had all but eradicated aquatic life in the river, causing the Israel Union for Environmental Defense (IUED) to file several successful lawsuits against two of the biggest polluters, Deshanim Ltd. And Haifa Chemicals. By 1998, most of Israel's surface water, rivers and streams, as well as its groundwater reserves, were polluted to a certain degree by industrial and civil waste. According to Israel's Ministry of Environmental Protection, the construction of wastewater treatment facilities have reduced sources of river pollution from 250 to 100 in the period between 1990 and 2010.

According to Israel's Ministry of Health, the state of Israel's drinking wells is also an issue. As of 2002, it was reported that 36% of the wells in the central coastal region had to be closed after failing to meet the existing standard for nitrate levels (90 mg/L ). According to a report published in 2010 by Israel's Ministry of Environmental Protection, a significant number of wells in the center and North of the country have tested positive for varying amounts of pollutants.

==== Ground water ====
Due to its location near the most urbanized and densely populated area of Israel, the Coastal Aquifer is exposed to many sources of pollutants, including chlorides, nitrates, heavy metals, fuels and organic toxins. As of 2004, approximately 41% of water taken from the Coastal aquifer met safety standards set by the European Union and World Health Organization. High demand for an expanding population has led to over pumping of the Coastal Aquifer, in some cases eclipsing its recharge rate by upwards of 100%. Overuse, introduction of man-made pollutants and absorption of seawater have increased the salinity of the aquifer.

Israel's Mountain aquifer has suffered from excessive pumping to the point where its water level sank below the legal minimum set by the Israeli water commission. The decline in water level has had negative effects on water sources in surrounding wetlands and nature reserves. A survey by the Hydrological Service of Israel in 2002 found that improperly handled waste from several settlements had filtered into the aquifer, introducing nitrates and other pollutants into the water supply. The threat of pollution to the Mountain Aquifer is far greater than that of the Coastal Aquifer due to its karstic composition, allowing for quicker absorption of both water and pollutants.

==== Water reclamation ====
Water scarcity in Israel has resulted in the development of a sophisticated water reclamation and conservation system, particularly in regards to agriculture. In 2008, Israel was using 82% of its municipal wastewater for irrigation purposes, more than any other country at the time. In 2015, treated waste water, alongside brackish and desalinated water accounted for approximately half of the country's supply of usable water. Currently, Israel produces 85% of the country's drinkable water, which is distributed by municipal and regional utilities via large-scale desalination of saltwater and brackish water. Israel has one of the biggest desalination plants in the world, to employ reverse osmosis.

One concern regarding wastewater treatment is the byproduct known as wastewater sludge. In 2008, more than 100,000 tons of this waste was either land-filled or disposed of directly into the sea. In 2002, it was discovered that around half of the treated waste water being used for irrigation did not meet safety standards, posing a danger to human life, water reserves and food crops.

=== Waste management ===
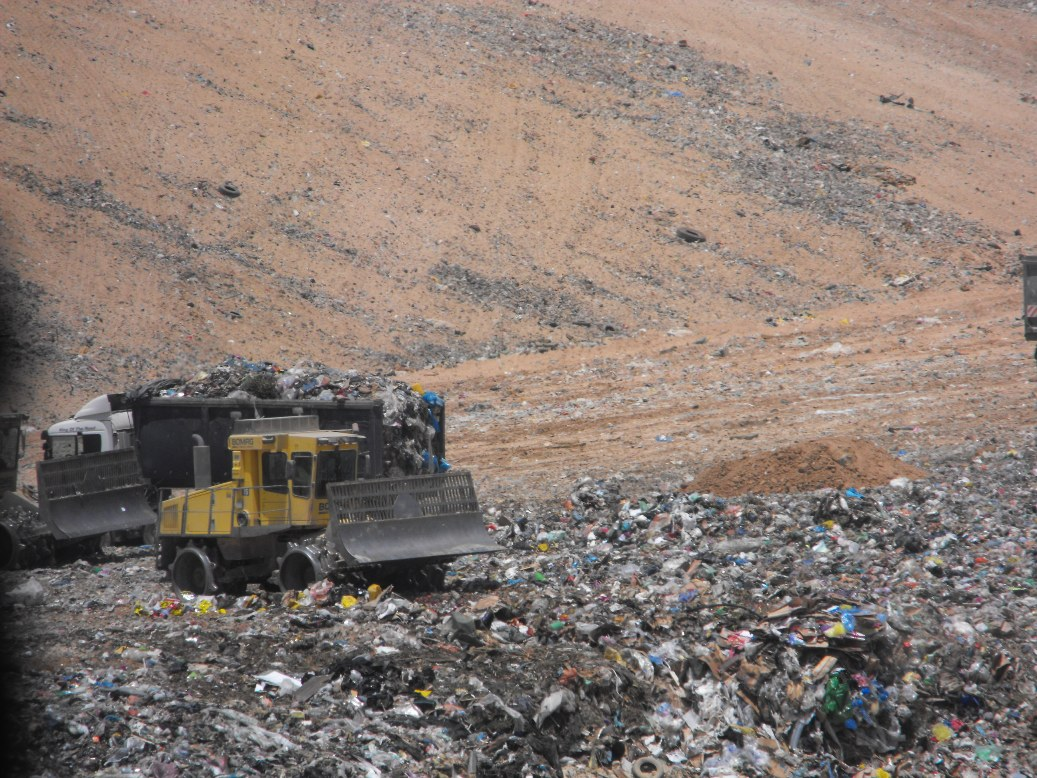
Ganey Hadas landfill, part of the Dudaim Waste Facility, Negev Desert

With a rapidly growing population and limited space to expand, Israel has faced significant issues concerning waste disposal over the last few decades. Until the early 1990s, most waste in Israel ended up in unregulated garbage dumps. Following a government order implemented in 1993, the unregulated dumps were closed due to severe contamination of local sources of surface and groundwater. As of 2010, approximately 65% of solid waste in Israel was disposed of via burning and land-filling and approximately 30% was recycled. The issue of limited space has led to pollutants from landfills finding their way into the environment and sources of drinking water. As of 2013, approximately half a million Israelis did not have access to proper sewage infrastructure and waste disposal. In other areas, rapid improvements in the standard of living has resulted in a 4-5% annual increase in solid waste, with the average quantity reaching approximately 11,300 tons per year.

== See also ==
- Palestinian airborne arson attacks
