= Plug-in electric vehicles in Israel =

As of December 2023, there were 97,721 electric vehicles in Israel, 18.6% of all new cars. (Note: Motor Vehicles in Israel in 2023, Israel Central Bureau of Statistics, 4.2024 (in Hebrew))

As of December 2022, there were 45,270 electric vehicles in Israel. As of December 2023, 18% of new cars sold in Israel were electric.

== Government policy ==
As of October 2022, the Israeli government charges a 10% tax on purchases of battery electric vehicles and a 40% tax on purchases of plug-in hybrid vehicles; these taxes are slated to increase to 20% and 55% respectively in 2023.

As of March 2022, the Israeli government offers tax subsidies of ₪1,200 for battery electric vehicle purchases, and ₪900 for plug-in hybrid vehicle purchases.

== Charging stations ==
As of July 2022, there were 1,000 public AC charging stations in Israel. As of September 2022, there were 120 public DC charging stations in Israel.

== By district ==
=== Tel Aviv ===
As of January 2022, a majority of Israel's public charging stations were in Tel Aviv.
