= 2018 Meretz leadership election =

Election for the leadership of Meretz party

- 22 March 2018

~30,000 party members simple majority of votes needed to win
- Turnout: 53.69%
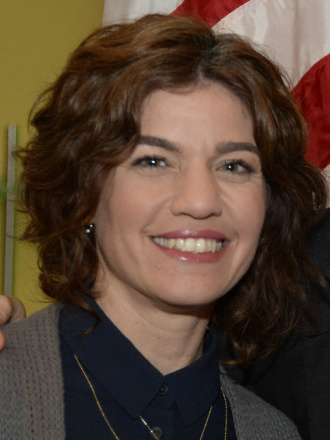

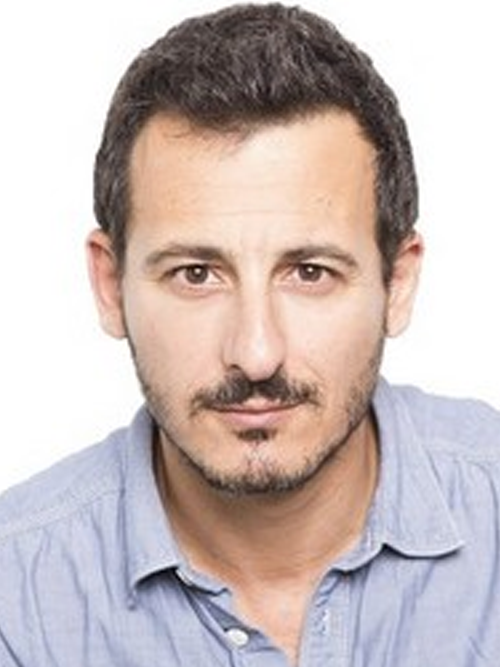
Candidate	Tamar Zandberg	Avi Buskila
Party	Meretz	Meretz
Popular vote	12,112	4,851
Percentage	71.21%	28.52%
Meretz leader before election
Zehava Galon
Meretz leader
Tamar Zandberg

An election was held for the leadership of the Meretz party on 22 March 2018. It saw the election of Tamar Zandberg.

== Background ==
The vote was open to party members. Party membership increased by 12,000, to roughly 30,000, ahead of the vote. Outgoing leader Galon wanted the election to use an open primary-style system in which any Israeli citizen could vote, regardless of party registration. The party wound up instead adopting a compromise presented by Tamar Zandberg, which saw the party allow anyone to register as a party member up to a month before the leadership election and the party's slate-selection primary, and be allowed to participate in those elections.

== Candidates ==
=== On ballot ===
- Avi Buskila, former secretary general of Peace Now
- David Cashni
- Ofir Paz
- Tamar Zandberg, member of the Knesset since 2013

=== Withdrawn ===
- Zehava Galon, incumbent leader of Meretz
- Avi Dabush endorsed Zandberg
- Ilan Gilon, member of the Knesset (1999–2003; since 2009) endorsed Zandberg
- Emri Kalman, endorsed Buskila
- David Neve

== Results ==
The party reported that 53.69% of eligible voters participated in the election. The party reported that 130 polling stations across Israel were utilized for the vote.

2018 Meretz leadership election
Party	Candidate	Votes	%
Meretz	Tamar Zandberg	12,112	71.21
Meretz	Avi Buskila	4,851	28.52
Meretz	David Cashni	23	0.14
Meretz	Ofir Paz	22	0.13
Turnout		17,008	53.69
