= Gaby Lasky =

Israeli advocate and politician

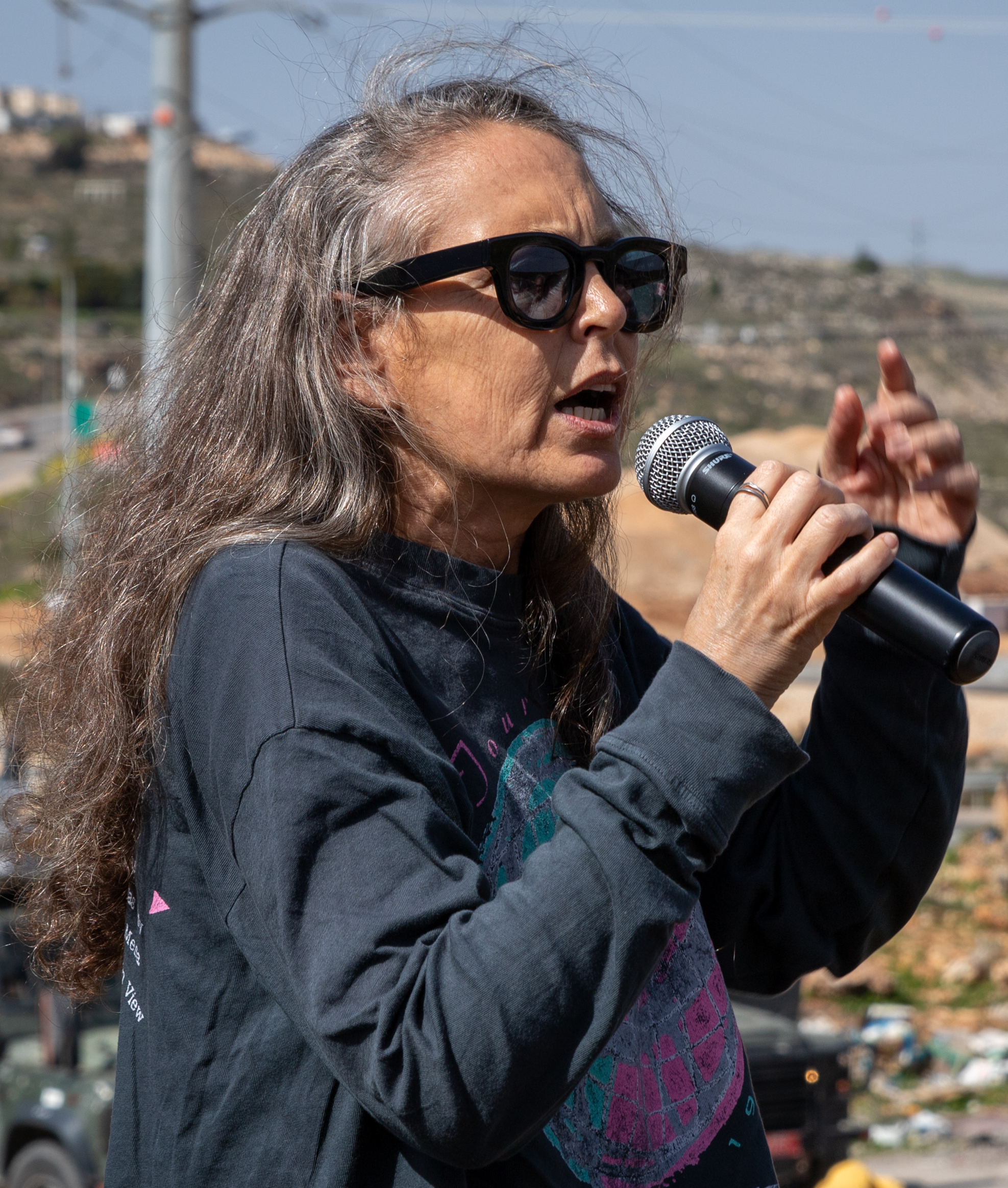
- Lasky in 2022

Faction represented in the Knesset
- 2021–2022: Meretz
- 2026–: The Democrats

Personal details
- Born: 18 March 1967 (age 59) Mexico City, Mexico

Gabriela "Gaby" Lasky Schutz (Hebrew: גבריאלה "גבי" שוץ לסקי) is an Israeli politician, attorney, feminist, human rights activist and social activist. She has served as a member of the Knesset since 2026 for The Democrats and served from 2021 until 2022 as an MK representing Meretz. She was a member of Tel Aviv City Council between 2013 and 2018 representing Meretz, and was the secretary general of Peace Now. As a human rights attorney, Lasky documents and responds to cases of torture, false imprisonment and police brutality within Israel, Gaza and the West Bank.

== Biography ==
Lasky was born in Mexico City, Mexico to a Jewish family. In 1982 she moved to Israel at the age of 15 on her own and went to a residential school run by the Youth Aliyah movement. Her family followed later on.

She studied at the College of Management, University of Tel Aviv and Northwestern University. As a student, she admired Shulamit Aloni and became the first head of Meretz's student organisation.

She is a partner in the law firm she founded, "Gaby Lasky & Associates", which specializes in freedom of speech and the right to protest. She has handled many high-profile cases, including those of conscientious objectors refusing to enlist for compulsory military service, whistleblowers, and Palestinian civilians arrested by Israeli security forces, and has argued some of their cases before Israel's Supreme Court. She represented Yonatan Polk from the anti-occupation organization Anarchists Against the Wall, the Gush Shalom faction in the legal fight against the Israeli anti-BDS law, political activists from the women's organization Machsom Watch (or Checkpoint Watch, an organization monitoring Israeli checkpoints controlling movement of Palestinian civilians), human rights organization B'Tselem, Dareen Tatour - an Arab poet prosecuted by Israel and imprisoned for publishing a poem on Facebook, as well as Ahed Tamimi - a teen-aged Palestinian activist imprisoned by Israel for slapping an armed soldier who entered her yard. Lasky is legal adviser to protest and social change organizations, including the Public Committee Against Torture in Israel and Breaking the Silence, and was formerly the chairperson of the Human Rights Legislation Committee of the Israeli Bar Association.

Lasky is a feminist political and social activist and a member of the Meretz political party. She served for five years as a Tel Aviv city council member and ran for the Knesset in the April 2019 elections. She was Secretary General of Peace Now in the early 2000s. Lasky initiated the adoption of the United Nations Security Council Resolution 1325 regarding inclusion of women in key decision-making roles as a Tel Aviv municipal law. She is chairperson of the municipal commission for the advancement of the status of women and gender equality, and is an advisor to the mayor on sustainability and urbanism.

In 2012 Lasky was awarded the Emil Greenzweig Human Rights Award by the Association for Civil Rights in Israel. In the award announcement, the reason stated included: ""Lasky is a central pillar for activists in Israel and the occupied territories, who works tirelessly to protect their rights, often without any compensation... In her public activity and impressive actions, Lasky sends a clear message to Israeli society: The struggle to ensure human and civil rights in Israel, and especially to guarantee the rights of the weakest and most vulnerable among us, is still underway."

On 6 August 2019 Lasky received a Human Rights Award in the memory of the Swedish lawyer Anna Dahlbäck. Lasky described the shrinking democratic space in Israel/Palestine and how defenders of human rights, like herself, are attacked and seen as traitors. Gaby Lasky also expressed her unwavering and staunch support for universal human rights. In the 2021 Israeli legislative election, he was placed sixth on the Meretz list, didn't elected earlier but entered the Knesset after the resignation of Tamar Zandberg after appointed as the ministerial position of Minister of Environmental Protection. Placed on the same spot on 2022 Israeli legislative election, she lost her seat on the Knesset after Meretz wiped out from the Knesset due to their failure to pass the election threshold. Lasky is also part of Havaya, an organization dedicated to organizing Jewish marriage ceremonies outside the mandatory Orthodox framework of Israel.

In January 2026, Lasky joined The Democrats party led by Yair Golan. In primary elections held on July 20, 2026, ahead of the 2026 Israeli legislative election, Lasky came in at number six on the slate. She was elected to the Knesset as the party won eight seats.

Lasky is married, has two children and lives in Tel Aviv.
