= Nitzan Horowitz =

Israeli politician (born 1965)

- ניצן הורוביץ
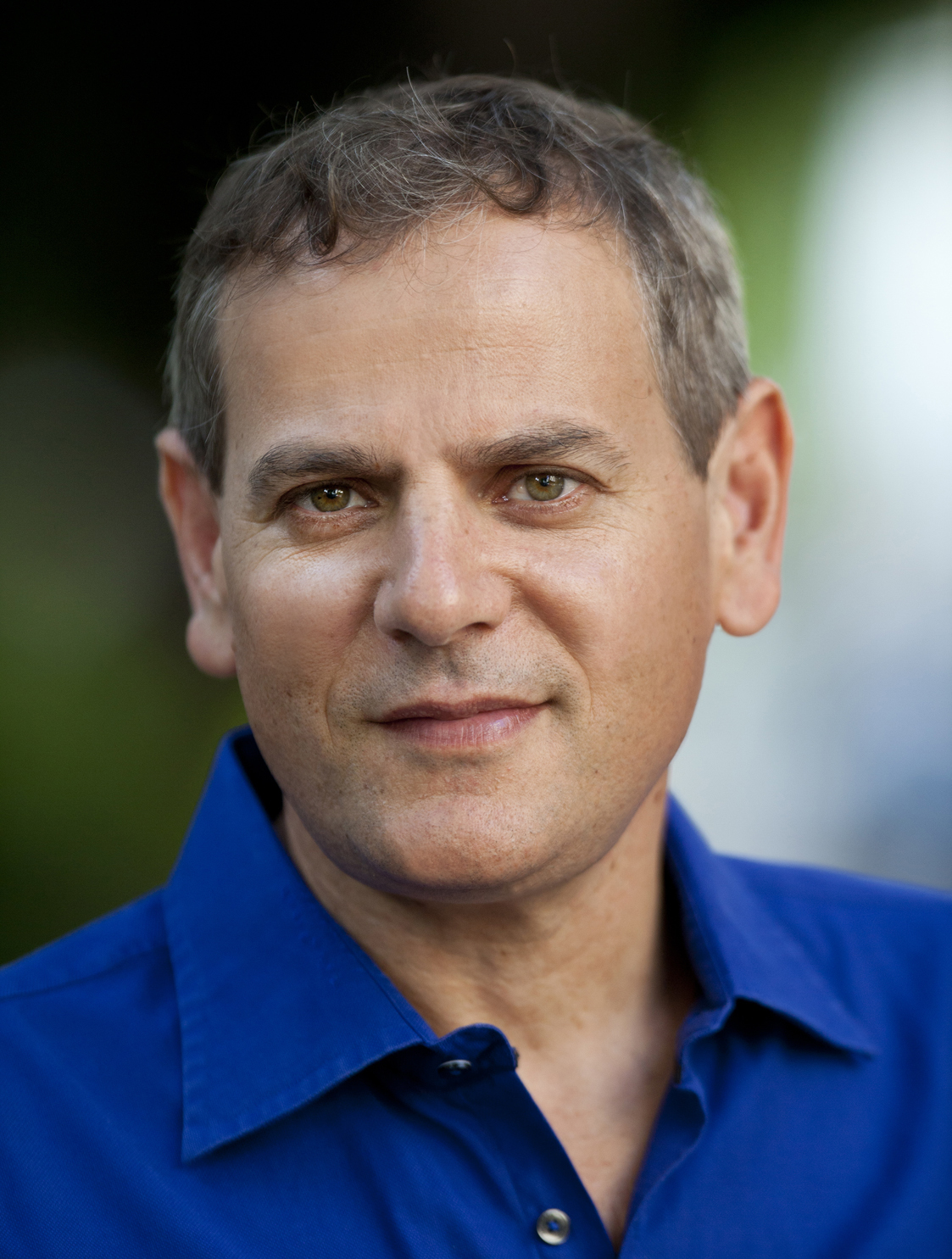

Ministerial roles
- 2021–2022: Minister of Health

Faction represented in the Knesset
- 2009–2015: Meretz
- 2019–2020: Democratic Union
- 2020–2022: Meretz

Personal details
- Born: 24 February 1965 (age 61) Rishon LeZion, Israel

Nitzan Horowitz (Hebrew: ניצן הורוביץ; born 24 February 1965) is an author, journalist and former politician who served as Israel's Minister of Health from 2021 to 2022. A former leader of Meretz, he previously served as the chief U.S. correspondent and commentator for Haaretz and Channel 2 News.

He served five terms in the Knesset (2009–2015, 2019-2022) on the Meretz list. Before being elected to the Knesset, he was the Foreign Affairs commentator and head of the International desk at Haaretz and Hadashot 10, the news division of TV Channel 10. In 2013, he ran for mayor of Tel Aviv. In June 2019, he won the Meretz leadership election, and served as the Minister of Health in the "government of change". In July 2022, he announced that he would step down as Meretz's leader.

He is the author of three books on the October 7, 2023, war.

== Early life ==
Horowitz was born in Rishon LeZion in 1965. He graduated from Tel Aviv University Law School and began working as a journalist.

== Journalism career ==
In his early career, he served as a military affairs reporter during the latter phase of the 1982 Lebanon war, as well as the international news editor at Army Radio from 1983 to 1987. In 1987, he began working at the Hadashot newspaper as the foreign affairs editor. In 1989, he moved to Haaretz, working as the foreign affairs editor. He served as a Haaretz correspondent in Paris between 1993 and 1998, covering the European Union, and as a Haaretz correspondent in Washington, D. C., from 1998 until 2001. After returning to Israel, Horowitz worked as a commentator and writer for Haaretz, and later served as the chief foreign affairs columnist for Channel 10.

When Hadashot 10 began broadcasting in January 2002, Horowitz established its international desk. His work there included creating documentary films following the tsunami disaster in eastern Asia and the failed search for Osama bin Laden in Afghanistan. He made regular appearances on Hadashot 10's current affairs show, London et Kirschenbaum, for which he provided reports and analysis of global news.

In 2008, Horowitz created and directed a documentary series for Channel 10, titled WORLD: The Next Generation – Nitzan Horowitz in search of tomorrow. The series followed major trends that could shape the future of the world in the coming decades, including the ageing crisis, urban sustainability, immigration, construction and industrial development in China, and the high-technology revolution in India.

Horowitz served as a board member of the Association for Civil Rights in Israel. He was also active in environmental issues; in 2007, he received the Pratt Prize for Environmental Journalism.

== Political career ==
In December 2008, he resigned from Channel 10 and became a Meretz candidate in the 2009 legislative elections. In the party primaries, he gained the third slot on the joint list of the New Movement and Meretz. He said: "My goal is to continue to do what I have been talking about over the past years, from protecting the seashore to promoting more sophisticated, non-polluting public transportation." Meretz won three seats in the elections, making Horowitz the second openly gay Knesset member in Israeli history, and the only openly gay member of the eighteenth Knesset. The first, Uzi Even, had also been a member of Meretz. On 16 February 2009, he announced a plan to bring to the Knesset a bill that would allow marriages or civil unions between two partners, regardless of their religion, ethnic background, or gender. Before being sworn into the Knesset, he was told to annul his Polish citizenship, which he had obtained due to his father's origins and had used as a journalist to enter countries that Israelis have difficulty entering.

In 2009, he announced that he would boycott all of the events related to Pope Benedict XVI's visit to Israel, saying that in his opinion, the pope bore a message of "rigidness, religious extremism, and imperviousness. Of all the Pope's injustices, the worst is his objection to disseminating contraceptives in Third World countries. It's hard to assess how many miserable men and women in Africa, Asia, and South America have contracted AIDS because of this Philistine attitude, but we are talking about many". He also published a two-part opinion piece on Ynetnews explaining his position.

Horowitz was re-elected to the Knesset in the January 2013 elections. In October 2013, he ran for mayor of Tel Aviv against long-time incumbent Ron Huldai. He lost, receiving 38% of the vote to Huldai's 53%. In 2014, he was given the Outstanding Parliamentarian Award by the Israel Democracy Institute.

He did not stand in the 2015 elections.

In June 2019, Horowitz successfully challenged incumbent Tamar Zandberg for the leadership of Meretz, which made Meretz the first Israeli party to elect an openly gay person as its leader. Horowitz led the party during the September 2019 Israeli legislative election. In 2021, he became Minister of Health in Naftali Bennett's cabinet. He resigned his Knesset seat to ultimately join the public sector he served in his ministerial position. Under Israel's Norwegian Law and was replaced by Michal Rozin.

Horowitz used a government circular to ban conversion therapy in February 2022. He supports Bernie Sanders, who calls for conditional aid to Israel, and is reluctant to display his Jewishness and is completely irreligious, as noted in his speeches to the liberal Jewish movement J Street; he has been criticized for his criticism of Israel. He also contributed to a coalition crisis in the Bennett–Lapid government by complying with an Israeli High Court decision that determined the government cannot prohibit visitors from bringing hametz into hospitals during Passover. After this action and amid secret talks with Benjamin Netanyahu, Yamina MK Idit Silman left the coalition, leaving it shy of a majority and unable to pass legislation.

Following the Knesset's dissolution and new elections scheduled for November 2022, Horowitz announced that he would step down as leader of Meretz. Placed 7th in the Meretz list on 2022 Israeli legislative election, he lost his seat because Meretz failed to pass the electoral threshold.

== Personal life ==
Horowitz was the first openly gay party leader in Israel. He resides in Tel Aviv with his life partner, opera and theater director, Ido Ricklin.

== Published works ==
- Trapped (לכודים - with Hervé Deguine): The heroic story of October 7, Yedioth Books, 2024 (in Hebrew).
- French edition: Les Assiégés, Éditions Cherche midi, 2025; winner of the Prix Galatée (2025).
- Expanded English edition: Trapped - Inside the Hell of October 7, 2026.
- Home on the Edge (הבית בקצה המדינה): The Evacuation of Kibbutz Hanita and the Northern Communities in the October 7 War, Hakibbutz Hameuchad, 2025 (in Hebrew). Received a special mention for the Yitzhak Sadeh Prize for Military Literature (2026).
- English edition: Home on the Edge, 2026.
