= Tamar Zandberg =

Israeli politician (born 1976)

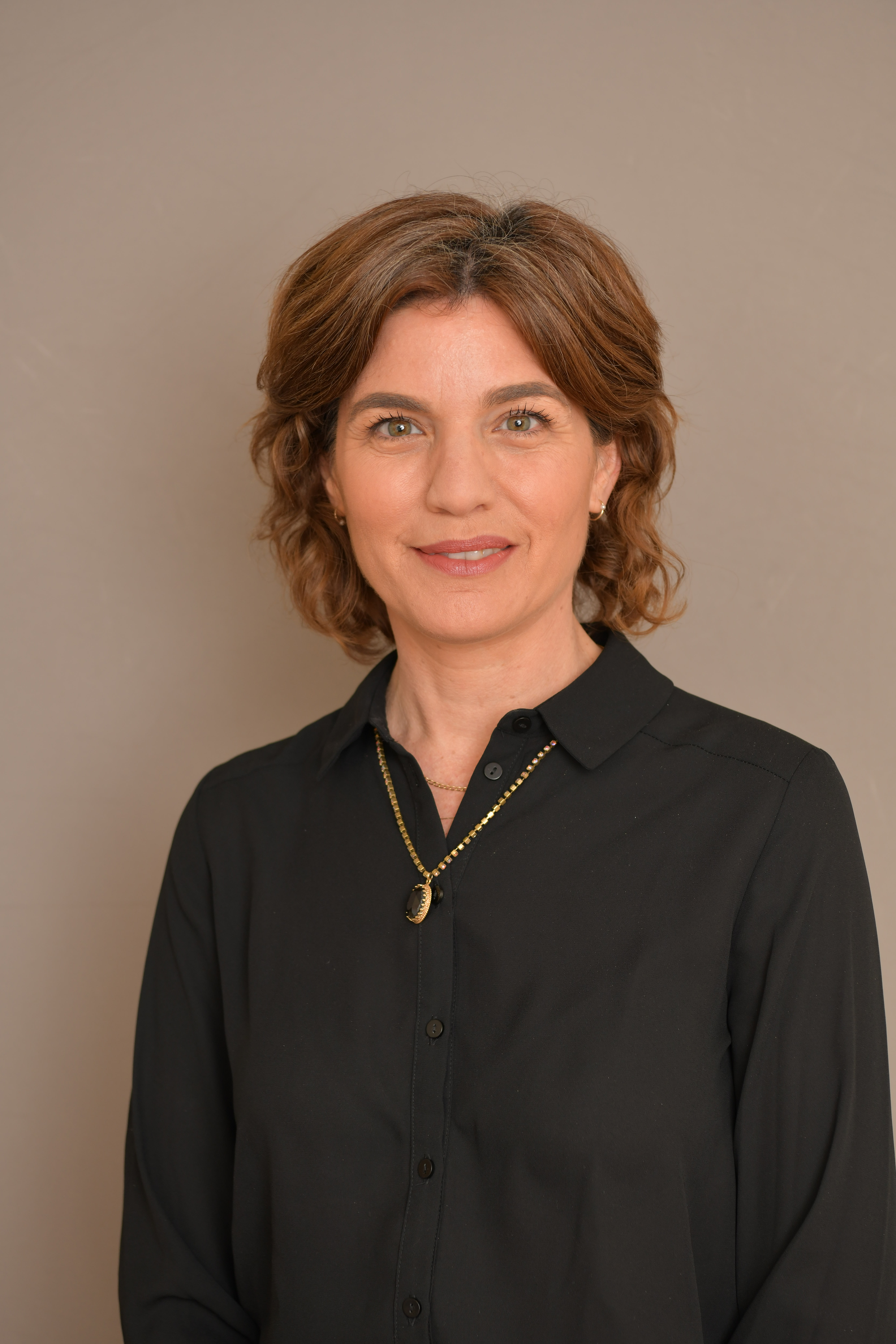
- Zandberg in 2021

Ministerial roles
- 2021–2022: Minister of Environmental Protection

Faction represented in the Knesset
- 2013–2019: Meretz
- 2019–2020: Democratic Union
- 2020–2021: Meretz

Personal details
- Born: 29 April 1976 (age 50) Ramat Gan, Israel

Tamar Zandberg (Hebrew: תָּמָר זַנְדְבֵּרְג; born 29 April 1976) is an Israeli politician who served as Minister of Environmental Protection from 2021 to 2022, as a member of the Knesset for Meretz from 2013 to 2021, and as the party's leader between 2018 and 2019. As of July 2025 she is the head of the National Institute for Climate and Environmental Policy at Ben Gurion University.

== Early life ==
Zandberg was born in Ramat Gan in 1976, the daughter of journalist Esther Zandberg and Yoel Zandberg and the sister of Israeli international footballer Michael Zandberg. She attended Blich High School and served in the Education Corps of the Israel Defense Forces. She holds a bachelor's degree in Psychology and Economics from the Hebrew University of Jerusalem, master's degree in Social Psychology from Ben-Gurion University of the Negev and a Law Degree (LLB) from Tel Aviv University, and until entering the Knesset she taught at Sapir Academic College in the Management and Public Policy department.

== Political career ==
She began her political career in 2003, when she started to work as a parliamentary assistant to Meretz MK Ran Cohen, a job she held until 2008. In the same year she was elected to Tel Aviv city council in second place on the Meretz list. During her term on the council, she chaired the city's Women's Affairs Committee and was a member of both the Finance Committee and the Affordable Housing Committee. She was behind an initiative to introduce public transportation on Shabbat, and also promoted action against the opening of strip clubs, advancement of civil and same-sex marriage and the promotion of women-run small businesses.

Zandberg was a main activist in the social protest movement of summer 2011 and was a member of the experts' group that introduced the movement's housing and transportation platform. During the protests, Zandberg led, along with other Meretz city council members, the withdrawal of Meretz from the council coalition, led by Mayor Ron Huldai due to violent suppression of the protests. She considers herself a feminist, urban environmentalist and a social democrat. She heads the opposition 'Social Home' faction within Na'amat, Israel's leading union for working women.

Prior to the 2013 elections she was placed sixth on the Meretz list, after raising the funding for her campaign through a crowdsourcing website which enabled people to donate small sums up to 1000 NIS. She entered the Knesset as the party won six seats. During her first term she founded and co-chaired the Lobby for Sustainable Transportation, was involved in the founding of the Urban Renewal Lobby and headed the Israeli Beaches Sub Committee. She put forward laws on paternity leave and the decriminalisation of the personal use of cannabis.

She ran in the fifth slot in the 2015 election and appeared to have lost her seat when preliminary resulted indicated Meretz had only won four seats. Party leader Zehava Galon announced that she would resign from the Knesset and as party chairperson in order to allow Zandberg, a rising star within the party, to re-enter the Knesset as the party's fourth MK. However, Zandberg urged Gal-On to reconsider her decision and remain as the party's leader in the Knesset. Once absentee and soldier ballots were counted, however, Meretz unexpectedly gained a fifth seat, negating the premise for Gal-On's resignation and allowing her to continue as party leader.

After being re-elected, she became a member of the Internal Affairs and Environment Committee and chair of the Committee on Drug and Alcohol Abuse, as well as co-heading the Social-Environmental Lobby, the Lobby for Sustainable Transportation and heading the Lobby for Urban Renewal. She won the Green Globe Award for her work as a public servant promoting environmental and sustainable legislation.

Zandberg won the election for the leadership of Meretz on 22 March 2018 with 71% of votes cast. She was re-elected to the Knesset in the April 2019 elections as the lead candidate on the Meretz list.

During the run-up to the September elections, she lost the party's leadership election to Nitzan Horowitz. Meretz joined the Democratic Union alliance for the elections, with Zandberg re-elected in fourth place on the list.

In June 2021 she became Minister of Environmental Protection in the thirty-sixth government of Israel. She resigned her Knesset seat under the Norwegian Law and was replaced by Gaby Lasky. That same month, Zandberg and her family briefly vacated their home in Tel Aviv after right-wing protesters made threats against her and her child.

== Personal life ==
Zandberg is divorced and has one daughter from her previous marriage and a second daughter with her partner, Uri Zaki, former executive director of B'Tselem USA, with whom she lived in Tel Aviv.

Zandberg is an atheist and a vegan.
