= Broadcast News =

Broadcast News may refer to:

- News, the communication of selected information on current events
- news broadcasting, dissemination through telecommunications
- Broadcast News (film), a 1987 movie
- Broadcast journalism, the field of electronically published news and journals
- Broadcast News (Canada), a subsidiary of the Canadian Press news agency
- Canadian Press Cable Service (formerly CableStream), a TV service referred to as "Broadcast News"

== See also ==
- Broadcast (disambiguation)
- News (disambiguation)
