= Yuval Hollander =

Israeli writer (born 1972)

- יובל הולנדר
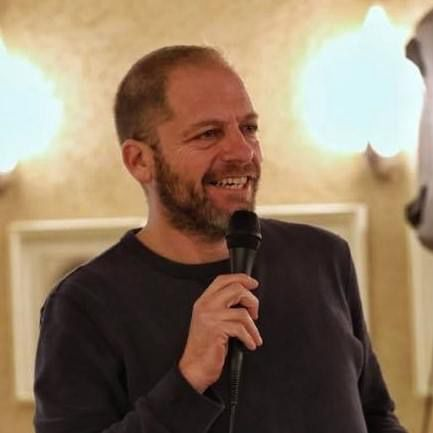
- Born: 1972 (age 53–54); Israel
- Known for: Israeli advertiser, documentary filmmaker, author, and communications researcher
- Spouse: Yifat Hollander
- Children: 3

Yuval Hollander (Hebrew: יובל הולנדר; born 1972) is an Israeli advertiser, documentary filmmaker, author, and communications researcher.

== Biography ==
Hollander was born in 1972 in Kiryat Tiv'on to Yael and Shaul Hollander. During his military service, he served as a deputy commander of Dvora-class fast patrol boat and Dabur-class patrol boat in the regular and reserve naval forces. He earned his bachelor's degree in political science from Bar-Ilan University and a master's degree in communications from Reichman University, and later studied at the ACC School of Copywriting.

After completing his studies in copywriting, Hollander began working as a copywriter in advertising agencies in 1998, and at the same time, he founded a company for creating websites. In 2000, he joined the Adler Chomsky & Warshavsky advertising agency and established its digital advertising department, which he also managed. In 2004, he joined the McCann Erickson advertising agency as the creative director of the digital department, and later, in 2009, served as the vice president of digital at the Raubeni Frieden advertising agency. He also returned to Adler Chomsky & Warshavsky as the head of the digital department in 2014.

Hollander established the field of social media studies at the Baitzifer School of Advertising in 2015. He lectures in the Communications Department at Reichman University and at the School of Communication at Bar-Ilan University. His research focuses on the impact of emotional mechanisms on the virality of advertisements and political content on social networks, and since 2018, he has been lecturing on neuromarketing together with Professor Yoram Yovell.

He previously served as the hummus critic for the "Achbar Ha'ir" newspaper and founded the "Hummus Now" application in 2010.

== Cinema ==
In 2012, Hollander served as a co-producer on the film "Cats on a Pedal Boat" created by his brother Nadav Hollander, Yuval Mendelson, and Jonathan Bar Ilan. In the same year, he directed and produced the documentary film "The Secrets of Bethsaida" about the archaeological site Tel Bethsaida on the shores of the Sea of Galilee.

In 2020, he directed and produced the film "Sunset" which tells the story of the crash of an Israeli Air Force Yas'ur helicopter and the encounter between the aircrew responsible for the accident and the bereaved family of Unit 669 soldier Gil Rosenthal, who was killed in the crash. The film was broadcast on Channel 13 in 2021, and is regularly shown in the Israeli Air Force's pilots' course and command courses in the Navy and other IDF units. Hollander created the film 27 years after serving as the deputy commander of a Navy ship that participated in retrieving Rosenthal's body after the crash.

In 2021, Hollander directed the film "A Sand Day", in collaboration with the international sand artist Ilana Yahav. The film artistically narrates, through animated sand, the story of Yaakov Kreiter, who survived the massacre in his town in Romania during the Holocaust.

In 2025, Hollander served as executive producer on the American comedy film Out of Order, directed by Guy Jacobson. The film stars Brooke Shields, Brandon Routh and Luis Guzmán.

== Books ==
Hollander wrote the book "Slowly Melting", published in 2018 in the United States. The book describes a military experiment conducted at Vandenberg Air Force Base in western California, in which a nuclear missile is launched towards the Pacific Ocean. The book details an event that occurs when the experimental nuclear missile, launched during a solar eruption, unexpectedly changes its course after launch.

In 2025, Hollander released in the United States the book Double-Edged Sword: Iran and the Illusion of Hatred – The Roots of an Anti-Israel Obsession. The book is a historical investigation into the motivations for hatred of Israel in Iran. The investigation traces back to the 1970s when Iranian revolutionaries trained in Palestinian refugee camps in Lebanon, and later became among the closest associates of Khomeini and senior officials in the Islamic Republic. The book was written in Hebrew, English and Persian.

== Personal life ==
He was married to Yifat Hollander (1977–2012) until her death, and they had three children. His brother is the Israeli musician and filmmaker Nadav Hollander.
