= Broadcast (disambiguation) =

Broadcasting is the transmission of audio and video signals.

Broadcast or Broadcasting may also refer to:

== Music ==
- Broadcast (band), an English electronic music band
- The Broadcast (band), an American Americana/soul band
- Broadcast (Cutting Crew album), 1986
- Broadcast (Meese album), 2009
- Broadcasting..., an album by Comeback Kid, 2007
- "The Broadcast", a song by Wings from Back to the Egg, 1979
- Broadcast Twelve Records, a British record label of the 1920s

== Magazines ==
- Broadcast (magazine), a weekly newspaper for the UK television and radio industry
- Broadcasting, original name of Broadcasting & Cable, a weekly magazine for the US television and radio industry

== Computing ==
- Broadcast address, an IP address allowing information to be sent to all machines on a given subnet
- Broadcasting (networking), transmitting a packet that will be received by every device on the network
- Broadcast (parallel pattern), communication pattern to distribute a message to all machines in a cluster
- Broadcast domain, a logical area where any computer connected to the network can directly transmit to any other

== Other uses ==
- The Broadcast (formerly The Fisheries Broadcast), a Canadian radio program
- Broadcast University, an Israeli radio program and book series
- Broadcast sowing, a method of hand sowing of seeds:
  - Sowing § Hand sowing
  - Broadcast seeding
- Radio program
- Television show
- Broadcast.com
- Broadcast seeding
