= Nechama Leibowitz =

Israeli biblical scholar

- נחמה ליבוביץ׳
- Born: 3 September 1905; Riga, Livonia Governorate, Russian Empire
- Died: 12 April 1997 (aged 91); Jerusalem, Israel
- Citizenship: Israeli
- Education: University of Berlin, University of Marburg
- Occupation: Teacher
- Organization(s): Mizrachi Women's Teachers' Seminar, Hebrew University of Jerusalem
- Known for: Torah Insights
- Notable work: Iyunim, or Insights on the Weekly Torah Reading
- Spouse: Lipman Leibowitz
- Relatives: Yeshayahu Leibowitz (brother); René Leibowitz (cousin); Yoram Yovell (great-nephew)
- Awards: Israel Prize (1956)

Nechama Leibowitz (Hebrew: נחמה ליבוביץ׳; September 3, 1905 – April 12, 1997) was Israel Prize laureate and Israeli Bible scholar and commentator who rekindled interest in Bible study.

== Biography ==
Nechama Leibowitz was born to an Orthodox Jewish family in Riga two years after her elder brother, the philosopher Yeshayahu Leibowitz. The family moved to Berlin in 1919. In 1930, Leibowitz received a doctorate from the University of Marburg for her thesis, Techniques in the Translations of German-Jewish Biblical Translations. She was advised by philologist Karl Helm. That same year 1930, she immigrated to Mandate Palestine with her husband Yedidya Lipman Lebowitz. She taught at a religious Zionist teachers' seminar for the next twenty-five years. In 1957 she began lecturing at Tel Aviv University, and became a full professor eleven years later. She also gave classes at the Hebrew University of Jerusalem and other educational institutions around the country. In addition to her writings, Leibowitz commented on the Torah readings regularly for the Voice of Israel radio station.

Her husband, Yedidya Lipman Leibowitz, was also her uncle. Despite much speculation about why they married, including the suggestion that it was to enable her to take care of him without transgressing religious laws, they married for love.

At her funeral, her nephew said that he is like a son to her and many of her students said kaddish for her together with her nephew. She is seen as a great religious role model for young religious children in Israel, and the Ne'emanei Torah Va'Avodah organization has encouraged the public school system in Israel to incorporate her into the selection of biographies that are studied by Israeli children in primary schools.

== Study sheets ==
In 1942, Leibowitz began mailing out stencils of questions on the weekly Torah reading to anyone who requested them. These worksheets, which she called gilyonot (pages), were sent back to her, and she personally reviewed them and returned them with corrections and comments. In 1954, Leibowitz began publishing her "Studies", which included many of the questions that appeared on her study sheets, along with selected traditional commentaries and her own notes on them. Over time, these studies were collected into five books, one for each book of the Torah. These books were subsequently translated into English by Rabbi Aryeh (Laibel/Leonard) Newman.

== Teaching style ==
When asked to describe her methods she replied, "I have no derech... I only teach what the commentaries say. Nothing is my own." She was noted for her modest demeanor coupled with wry wit, and always preferred the title of "teacher" over the more formal "professor". In accordance with her request, "מורה" (morah, "teacher") is the only word inscribed on her tombstone, other than her name and dates. She was strict on marking mistakes in Hebrew test papers, and hated the code-switching "Heblish" of some anglophone immigrants.

== Awards and recognition ==
- In 1956, Leibowitz was awarded the Israel Prize in education, for her work in furthering understanding and appreciation of the Bible.
- In 1983, she was a co-recipient (jointly with Ephraim Elimelech Urbach) of the Bialik Prize for Jewish thought.

== Published works ==
- ʻIyunim be-Sefer Bereshit : be-ʻiḳvot parshanenu ha-rishonim ṿeha-aḥaronim, 1966; English: Studies in Bereshit (Genesis) in the context of ancient and modern Jewish Bible commentary, 1971
- ʻIyunim be-Sefer Shemot: be-ʻiḳvot parshanenu ha-rishonim ṿeha-aḥaronim, 1969; Eng. Studies in Shemot (Exodus), 1976
- ʻIyunim be-Sefer Vayikra: be-ʻiḳvot parshanenu ha-rishonim ṿeha-aḥaronim, 1982; Eng. Studies in Vayikra (Leviticus), 1980
- ʻIyunim be-Sefer BaMidbar: be-ʻiḳvot parshanenu ha-rishonim ṿeha-aḥaronim, 1994; Eng. Studies in Bamidbar (Numbers), 1980
- ʻIyunim be-Sefer Devarim: be-ʻiḳvot parshanenu ha-rishonim ṿeha-aḥaronim, 1996; Eng. Studies in Devarim (Deuteronomy), 1980
- Torah insights, 1995
- Studies on the Haggadah from the teachings of Nechama Leibowitz, 2002

== See also ==
- List of Israel Prize recipients
- List of Bialik Prize recipients
- Women of Israel
