= Broadcast University =

Israeli radio program and book series

Broadcast University אוניברסיטה משודרת
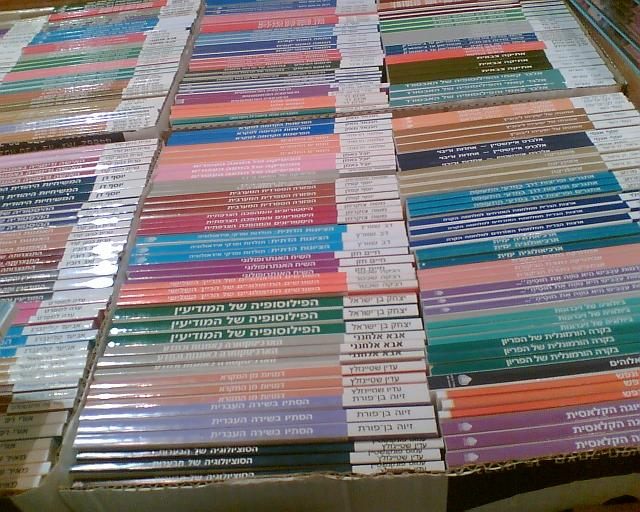
- Books published by the Broadcast University at the Hebrew Book Week
- Parent company: Israeli Army Radio
- Status: Active
- Founded: 1977; 49 years ago
- Founder: Mordechai Naor
- Country of origin: Israel
- Headquarters location: Tel Aviv, Israel
- Nonfiction topics: Mostly social science and humanities
- Official website: glz.co.il/האוניברסיטה-המשודרת

Broadcast University (Hebrew: אוניברסיטה משודרת) is an Israeli radio program and book series that features lectures on academic subjects. The lectures are produced in collaboration with Tel Aviv University (TAU) and are aired on Israeli Army Radio, a state-funded Israeli radio network operated by the Israel Defense Forces, where the program has been running since 1977.

Most of the lectures are subsequently published as books by the Ministry of Defense Publishing House. As of 2013, Broadcast University aired 6,000 lectures, published around 340 books and sold around 750,000 copies.

Prominent lecturers who have participated in the series include Professors Yeshayahu Leibowitz, Michael Harsgor, Yirmiyahu Yovel and Asa Kasher. Most are faculty members at Israeli universities and colleges.

== History ==
Broadcast University was established in 1977 by Mordechai Naor who served as the commander of the Israeli Army Radio from 1974 to 1978. Prior to its establishment as an independent body, the program was aired on Kol Yisrael, Israel's public domestic and international radio service, under the initiation of Professor Shmuel Sambursky.

Tirza Yuval Elchanati edited and produced the program from its inception in 1977 until her death on December 27, 2000. Following her death, the series was renamed in her memory and she was nominated for the Israel Prize.

== Format ==
Until 2015, lectures were aired during Israeli university semesters, covering four or five topics per semester (Sunday through Thursday). Each course consisted of approximately 13 episodes.

In March 2015, the series changed its format. Instead of formal lectures, it now features conversations between a presenter and an academic expert (similar to a podcast). Presenters of the series include Liad Modrik, Ben Shani and Kobi Midan.

As of 2016, broadcasts air in the evening at 20:30. Previously, each lecture was aired twice daily, in the morning (06:30) and in the evening (20:30).
