= Hagit Ofran =

Israeli activist

Hagit Ofran (Hebrew: חגית עופרן; born 1975) is an Israeli peace activist. Since 2007 she has directed Peace Now's Settlement Watch project, which monitors the Israeli settlement movement. In 2014 Haaretz wrote that she "may know more about the scope of settlement construction than any person alive," an assessment echoed by Qantara.de in 2021.

== Early life ==
Ofran grew up in Jerusalem, in a religiously observant family with eight siblings. Yeshayahu Leibowitz, the Orthodox Jewish intellectual and critic of the occupation, was her grandfather. She earned a bachelor's degree in Jewish History at Hebrew University.

== Political views and activism ==
As director of Settlement Watch, Ofran researches and writes about settlement construction, participates in court cases related to outpost settlements, and travels widely throughout the West Bank. She speaks fluent Arabic.

Ofran worked for the Geneva Initiative and served as Yossi Beilin's personal assistant during his time as Minister of Justice. In the 2000s she was also involved with the political party Meretz.

Ofran has had stones thrown at her by settlers and death threats spray-painted on her home on multiple occasions.

Ofran considers herself a Zionist: "The term Zionism has been hijacked, but I would call myself a Zionist by my own definition...I support the State of Israel as the home of the Jews. But in my Zionism, the Palestinians have full rights. And if one day the residents of the state elect a Palestinian as prime minister, so be it. It's not a threat."

== Personal life ==
Ofran lives in Jerusalem with her partner and three children.
