= Peace Now =

Israeli peace advocacy group

- Founded: 1978; 48 years ago
- Founders: Amos Oz; Amir Peretz; Yuli Tamir; Tzaly Reshef; Janet Aviad; Gavri Bargil; Galia Golan; Avshalom Vilan
- Type: Non-profit; NGO
- Purpose: Two-state solution to the Israeli–Palestinian conflict
- Location: Tel Aviv, Jerusalem, Israel
- Region served: Israel and the Israeli-occupied territories
- Method: "public campaigns, advertisements, petitions, distribution of educational materials, conferences, lectures, surveys, dialogue groups, street activities, vigils, and demonstrations."
- Members: over 10,000
- Key people: Shaqued Morag (Director); Yariv Oppenheimer (Secretary); Hagit Ofran (Settlement Watch Director)
- Website: peacenow.org.il/eng

Peace Now (Hebrew: שָׁלוֹם עַכְשָׁיו Shalom Achshav, IPA: [ʃaˈlom (ʔ)aχˈʃav]) is an Israeli liberal advocacy organization with the aim of promoting a two-state solution to the Israeli–Palestinian conflict.

== Early activism ==
In an official document from 1982 Peace Now advocated for an undivided Jerusalem as Israel's capital. It has since shifted its position to two capitals for two states – a solution based on demographic breakdowns with a special agreement for the Old City.

Peace Now again came to prominence following Israel's 1982 Invasion of Lebanon, and in particular the massacre of Palestinian refugees by Christian Lebanese Phalangists at the Israeli controlled Sabra and the Shatila refugee camp. On 25 September 1982 Peace Now held a mass protest in Tel Aviv in order to pressure the government to establish a national inquiry commission to investigate the massacres, as well as calling for the resignation of the defence minister Ariel Sharon. Peace Now's 1982 demonstration was attended by 400,000 people, approximately 10% of Israel's population at the time.

=== Emil Grunzweig ===
In the wake of the Sabra and Shatila massacre, Peace Now led a march from Zion Square and moved towards the Prime Ministers' Office in Jerusalem on 10 February 1983. During the march Peace Now demonstrators encountered a group of right-wing activists. In the ensuing confrontation, Yona Avrushmi tossed a hand-grenade into the crowd, killing Emil Grunzweig, a prominent Peace Now activist, and injuring several others.

Yona Avrushmi was duly arrested, convicted of murder and given a mandatory life sentence, which was commuted to 27 years by President Ezer Weizman in 1995. Avrushmi was released on 26 January 2011.

As a result of mounting public pressure on Menachem Begin to adopt the Kahan Commission's recommendations Ariel Sharon agreed to step down as Defence Minister. However, he remained in the government as a minister without portfolio.

== Peace Now and the First Intifada (1987–1993) ==
In 1988 Yasser Arafat (Chairman of the PLO) publicly accepted United Nations Security Council Resolution 242 at the PNC in Algiers. For the first time, Yasser Arafat accepted Israel's existence according to its borders set out in United Nations General Assembly Resolution 181, and rejected and condemned the use of terrorism in all its forms. In reaction Peace Now led a demonstration of more than 100,000 people, calling for immediate Israeli-Palestinian negotiations for the purposes of attaining peace between the two parties. Following this, Peace Now led the Hands Around Jerusalem event, in which 25,000 Israelis and Palestinians linked hands to encircle the walls of the Old City of Jerusalem in a chain of peace.

In part due to the Israeli-Palestinian discourse engendered by Peace Now and its activists, Israeli Prime Minister Yitzchak Rabin and Yasser Arafat succeeded in signing the Declaration of Principles/Oslo Accords on the lawn of the White House on 13 September 1993. Peace Now was the first Israeli organisation to meet with the PLO, at a time when such an undertaking was deemed illegal by the Israeli government.

Peace Now supported the Oslo Accords, and since then it has called upon all Israeli administrations to date to adhere to the terms of interim agreements which were agreed upon as part of the Oslo Peace Process.

== Peace Now and the Second Intifada (2000–2005) ==
Since the outbreak of the violent Second Intifada in December 2000, Peace Now has arguably lost a certain degree of the Israeli public's support. While the First Intifada was largely a popular movement on the part of the Palestinian public, the Second Intifada consisted of far more violent confrontations between Palestinian militants and the IDF, Israeli settlers within the West Bank and the Gaza Strip, and Israeli civilians. According to the Israeli Ministry of Foreign Affairs, 132 Israeli individuals were killed by Palestinian militant bomb/suicide attacks within Israel proper between 2000 and 2004.

Despite the arguable decline in the Israeli public's support for the Oslo Peace Process, Peace Now succeeded in leading a demonstration of between 60,000 to 100,000 in May 2002, after Israeli military forces began on 29 March a large-scale military Operation Defensive Shield in the West Bank and as Prime Minister Ariel Sharon was mobilizing reserve forces for a possible military invasion of Gaza. The demonstration was held under the banner "Get Out of The Territories". According to "Peace Now" itself, shortly after the outbreak of the Second Intifada, it was instrumental in creating the Israeli Peace Coalition, which later evolved into the Israeli-Palestine Peace Coalition. Its main objective is to end the Israeli occupation of Palestinian lands, and to achieve a just, lasting and comprehensive peace based on a two-state solution.

=== Israel's unilateral disengagement from the Gaza Strip ===
Peace Now was a key advocate of Israel's 2004 Disengagement Plan. Peace Now led the 'Mate ha-Rov' ("majority camp") demonstration on 14 May 2004 in Tel Aviv, in order to pressure the Israeli government to adopt the Disengagement Plan. However, support for the Disengagement Plan faced contention within the Peace Now camp over its unilateral nature. Peace Now decided it was most important for Israel to withdraw from the Gaza Strip, regardless of how this withdrawal was to take place.

== Settlement Watch ==
=== Settlement activity ===
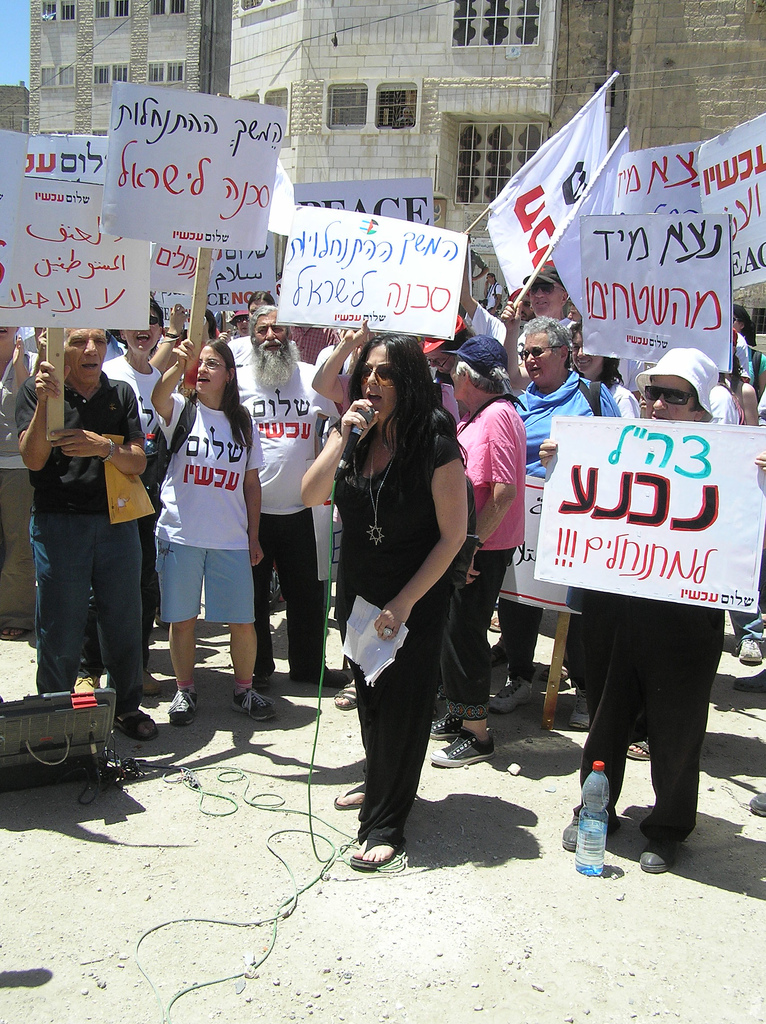
2007 Peace Now demonstration in Hebron

Peace Now's Settlement Watch project monitors and protests against the building of Jewish settlements in the West Bank, including East Jerusalem. Dror Etkes headed this committee until 2007, when he was replaced by Hagit Ofran. The project focuses on the following issues with regards to the settlements:-

Peace Now's Settlement Watch project has resulted in the following developments:-

- Amona (2005) – Peace Now motioned to the Supreme Court demanding the evacuation of the settlement in Amona. Their motion was accepted and the settlement was evacuated by security forces several months later.
- A decision, never implemented, to remove of all illegal West Bank settlements (March 2011) – Following a petition submitted by Peace Now to the Israeli Supreme Court, Benyamin Netanyahu's government ordered that the state dismantle all illegal West Bank outposts built on private Palestinian land by the end of 2011.
- Migron (ongoing)- Following a petition to the Israeli Supreme Court by Peace Now, the state was ordered to dismantle Migron, the largest illegal settlement outpost in the West Bank, by April 2012. This was key as this was the first time the Supreme Court had ordered the Israeli state to dismantle an outpost in the West Bank.

Similarly, the movement continues activity on the ground in support of evacuation through demonstrations, vigils and other campaign activity. Activities include:

- Updates on settlement expansion by means of aerial photography/ground surveys
- Publication of figures to the public and decision makers in Israel as well as around the world (American government officials often rely on data presented by Peace Now to assess the nature of Israel's various settlement programs)

=== Leaked diplomatic cables ===
According to diplomatic cables leaked in April 2011, Peace Now has regularly updated both the U.S. government and the Israeli Ministry of Defense on ongoing settlement construction in the West Bank. The documents indicate that the Defence Ministry used Peace Now's services to monitor West Bank settlement construction. In 2006, Peace Now director Yariv Oppenheimer reportedly urged the U.S. to pressure Israel into evacuating West Bank outposts, according to a leaked U.S. diplomatic cable. Oppenheimer was quoted as saying that Israel might "evacuate a few outposts to show the U.S. that it is doing something, but in exchange it is trying to co-opt the settlers by retroactively approving some outposts and giving them a freer hand in building in the West Bank."

=== 2006 settlement report ===
In a report issued in November 2006, Peace Now wrote that 38.8 percent of the land set aside for Israeli settlements, outposts and industrial land in the West Bank was privately owned by Palestinians. This included 86.4 percent of the land set aside for Ma'ale Adumim and 35.1 percent of Ariel's land. After successfully appealing to a court for access to a government database operated by the Israeli Civil Administration, Peace Now reduced its overall estimate to 32.4 percent and the estimate for Ma'ale Adumim to 0.5 percent. A spokesman for the Civil Administration replied that the new report was still "inaccurate in many places".

== Internet campaigns ==
Peace Now seeks to promote its various causes via an active presence on such social networking sites as Facebook. Against the background of the 'Boycott Laws' which were being passed through the Knesset in July 2011, the popular Israeli internet site 'Horim B’reshet' made a survey of the most popular Israeli protest Facebook pages, of which Peace Now's page ranked 5th.

== West Bank tours for opinion-makers ==
Peace Now aims to educate leading decision makers on the perceived counterproductive effects the settlements have on the attainment of the two-state solution.

One such tour was conducted by Peace Now in August 2009 and attended by such figures as MKs Ophir Pines-Paz (Labor), Daniel Ben-Simon (Labor) and Chaim Oron (Meretz Chairman).

== Demonstrations/rallies ==
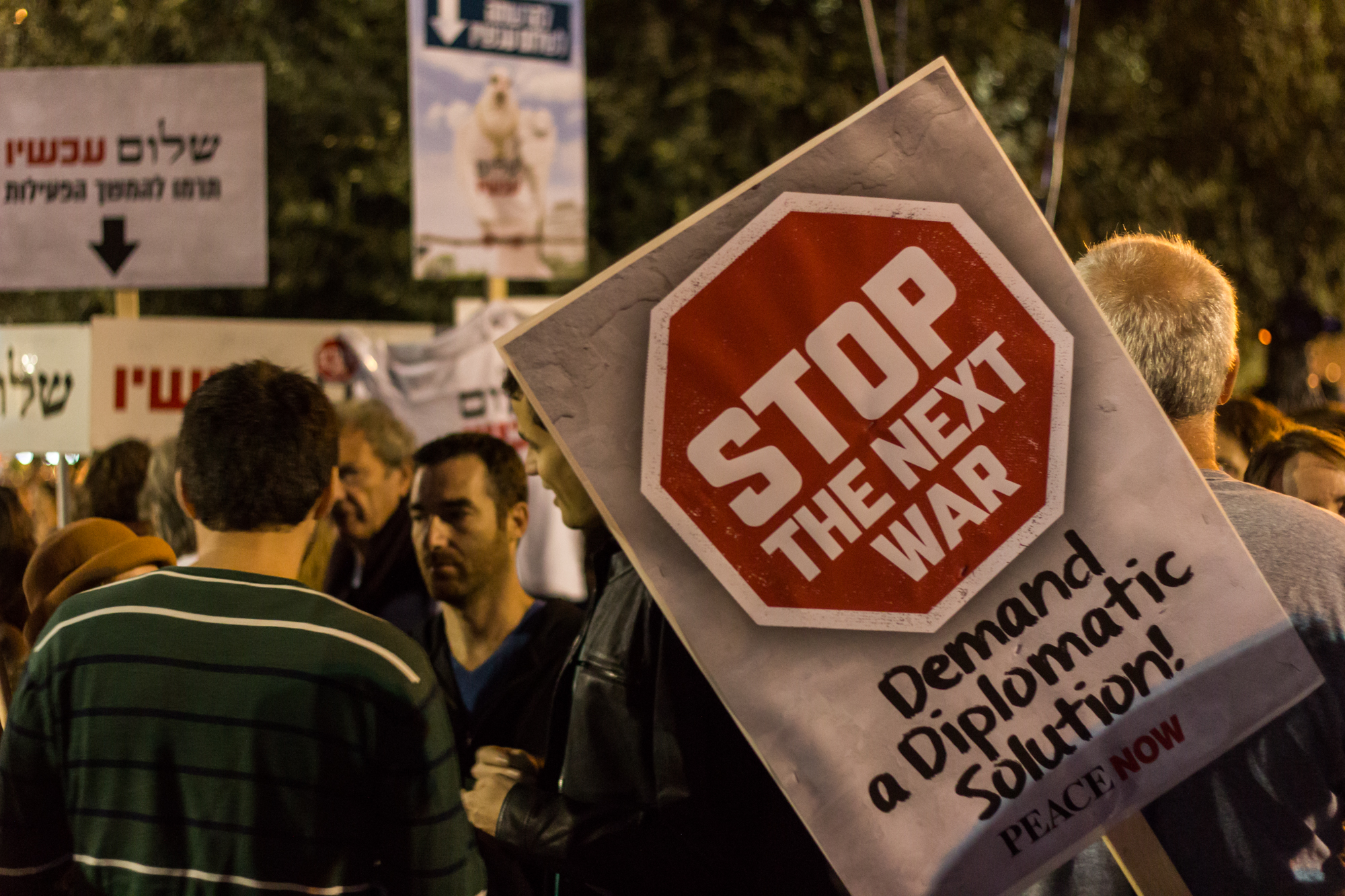
Peace Now at the Rabin memorial rally in Rabin Square, 1 November 2014

Peace Now organises demonstrations and rallies in support of peace and human rights:-

- Rally Against Racism (26 February 2011) – Peace Now joined 1,500 other activists at Zion Square, Jerusalem, to protest against the spate of government policies dealing with the nature of the citizenship of Arab-Israelis living within the Israeli state; especially those forwarded by Israel's outspoken Foreign Minister Avigdor Lieberman (Yisrael Beiteinu).
- In support of a Palestinian state in the West Bank and the Gaza Strip (4 June 2011) – Peace Now joined 5000 other activists in a march in Tel Aviv, to support the Palestinian bid for United Nations membership as an independent state.
- Against the 'Boycott Law' (10 July 2011) – Peace Now held a protest in Jerusalem in response to proposed Knesset legislation stating that any boycott against Israel or any group located within territory it controls, including the West Bank, would be labeled a civil offense. This law made boycotters subject to litigation and financial penalties. Following the passing of the boycott legislation into law, Peace Now led a campaign calling for the boycott of settlement produce.
- 'Glenn Beck go home' (24 August 2011) – In response to Glenn Beck's 'Restoring Courage' tour in Israel, Peace Now activists protested outside the Jerusalem rally held by the conservative American broadcaster, claiming that his ultra-conservative values inflamed the already tense situation with regards to the Israel and Palestine situation.
- Yitzchak Rabin Memorial Rally – Every year since former Israel Prime Minister Yitzchak Rabin's assassination (4 November 1995), Peace Now activists take part in an annual rally in Rabin Square (Tel Aviv) to commemorate the statesman's life, and to issue calls in support for the re-invigoration of the Middle East Peace Process.
- In support of 'Freedom of Speech' (22 November 2011) – In response to a proposed government amendment to Israel's 'Defamation Law', which would increase the maximum compensation paid for libel violations sixfold to NIS 300,000 (roughly $80,500), regardless of proof of damages, Peace Now led a 2000-strong rally in Tel Aviv.

== 'Price-Tag' attacks against Peace Now activists ==
Due to Peace Now's continued opposition to the development and construction of Jewish settlements in the West Bank/East Jerusalem, the organisation and several of its leading activists have been subject to 'price-tag' attacks and death-threats.

A 'price-tag' attack is defined as a violent act committed against Palestinians, Israeli security forces and/or anti-settlement organizations by pro-settlement advocates in retaliation for terrorist attacks on Israeli targets, government demolition of structures in West Bank settlements or curbs on Israeli settlement construction in the West Bank.

In response to the demolition of three homes in the Migron settlement (as a result of a petition submitted to the Israeli Supreme Court by Peace Now in 2006), right-wing demonstrators spray-painted 'Price Tag Migron', 'Revenge' and 'Death to Traitors' on the entrance to the residence of Hagit Ofran, the head of Peace Now's 'Settlement Watch' project, in early October 2011. Following the incident, a police investigation was opened. Approximately two months later, another 'price tag' attack was carried out, again at Hagit Ofran's residence.

At the 2011 Rabin commemoration rally in Tel Aviv, Hagit Ofran stated in reference to the recent 'price tag attacks':

"The graffiti was sprayed in my home, but the taunts are in all of our stairwells. The tag may have marked me, but we all pay the price. We must not fear. We are here, and we are many. We have a voice and we must raise it. And today we say to Benjamin Netanyahu: We are not afraid."

On 6 November 2011, Peace Now's Jerusalem office received a bomb threat. Police were called to the scene and the building was evacuated. The threat was later found to be a hoax. Following a brief investigation, Jerusalem District Police arrested a 21-year-old male resident of a settlement near Jerusalem who was suspected of vandalizing Peace Now offices in Jerusalem. Police also tried to ascertain whether the suspect was involved in the 'price-tag' attacks on Hagit Ofran's residence. A gag order was initially placed on the publication of his name and picture due to the "ongoing investigation" into the attacks. Once the investigation was complete, the gag order remained in effect, despite the suspect not being a minor. The order also applied to details about the suspect's parents, due to the politically sensitive nature of their occupation.

Although the suspect had been arrested two months previously for issuing death threats against Peace Now's Director General Yariv Oppenhimer and a bomb hoax at the organisation's Jerusalem office, he was released shortly afterwards.

Following court proceedings against the suspect, he was released to house arrest and forced to wear an electronic bracelet, yet his 'price-tag' activities continued. On 27 November 2011, it was reported that the unnamed individual issued death-threats (via email) against all of Peace Now's core team from his Jerusalem house. The gag order remained.

== Financing by foreign governments ==
Peace Now has received funding from foreign states and international organizations for such projects as those which measure the expansion of Israeli settlements in the West Bank. In 2008 Peace Now received ILS 935,622 from the Norwegian embassy, ILS 547,751 from the British Foreign Office, ILS 285,857 from Germany's Institut für Auslandsbeziehungen, and ILS 76,267 from the Dutch Ministry of Foreign Affairs. According to Im Tirtzu, Peace Now received ILS 844,000 from the embassy of Norway in 2009, as well as ILS 731,000 from the United Kingdom and ILS 555,000 from the Belgian government.

In 2011, the Knesset passed a law which required organizations to report each quarter on any foreign funding they receive. In November 2011, Benyamin Netanyahu's government began proceedings to introduce legislation which would place a ILS 20,000 (approx $5,000) limit on what NGOs could receive from foreign governments, government-supported foundations and/or groups of governments (e.g. the European Union and the United Nations). Another bill, advanced by Avigdor Lieberman's Yisrael Beiteinu party, proposed a 45% tax on foreign government donations to organizations that do not receive Israeli state funding.

Individuals such as Prime Minister Benyamin Netanyahu, Foreign Minister Avigdor Lieberman and MKs Tzipi Hotovely, Ofir Akunis and Fania Kirshenbaum have supported the proposed legislation. They argue that the legislation prevents foreign governments and organizations from unduly influencing Israel's domestic affairs. The legislation has encountered notable resistance from within Israel itself and abroad. The governments of the United Kingdom and the United States warned Benyamin Netanyahu that the adoption of such measures would harm Israel's standing in the West as a democratic country.

== Certificate of Merit for Support to IDF Reservists ==
Peace Now received a certificate of merit from the Israeli government and IDF for support given to IDF reserve soldiers. The certificate was issued as part of a competition which honours organizations, businesses and companies whose workers serve as reservists and are supported by their workplace. The certificate was personally signed by Ehud Barak and Chief Reserve Officer Brigadier General Shuki Ben-Anat. It read:

'For your activity and care for employees serving in reserve duty. Your activity is commendable and greatly contributes to the IDF's fortitude and the State of Israel's security."

== Notable supporters ==
Notable individuals such as American actor Leonard Nimoy, American authors Michael Chabon and Ayelet Waldman, and Israeli authors David Grossman and Amos Oz support Peace Now's objectives. Author Mordechai Bar-On described Peace Now as a key instrument for peace. Actor Mandy Patinkin expressed his support for Peace Now during a visit to Israel in 2012.

== Logo ==
Peace Now's logo was designed by Israeli graphic designer David Tartakover in 1978. The logo emerged from a poster created by Tartakover for a mass rally, held in what is now Rabin Square in Tel Aviv on 1 April 1978, titled "Peace Now." It became the name of the organization, and was used on the first political bumper sticker in Israel. It is still one of Israel's most popular stickers. Tartakover, commenting in 2006, said: "The movement activists liked the logo, but they thought there should also be a symbol. I told them it wasn't needed – this is the symbol. It took time until they understood that this was the first political sticker in Israel."

== Affiliated organisations ==
- Americans for Peace Now
- Amigos Brasileiros do Paz Agora (Brazil)
- Argentinos Amigos de Paz Ahora (Argentina)
- Brits for Peace Now (UK)
- Canadian Friends of Peace Now
- La paix maintenant (France)
- Les Amis Belges de Shalom Archav (Belgium)

== See also ==
- List of anti-war organizations
- B'Tselem
- Shir LaShalom
