= Yeshayahu Leibowitz =

Israeli Orthodox Jewish philosopher (1903–1994)

- ישעיהו ליבוביץ
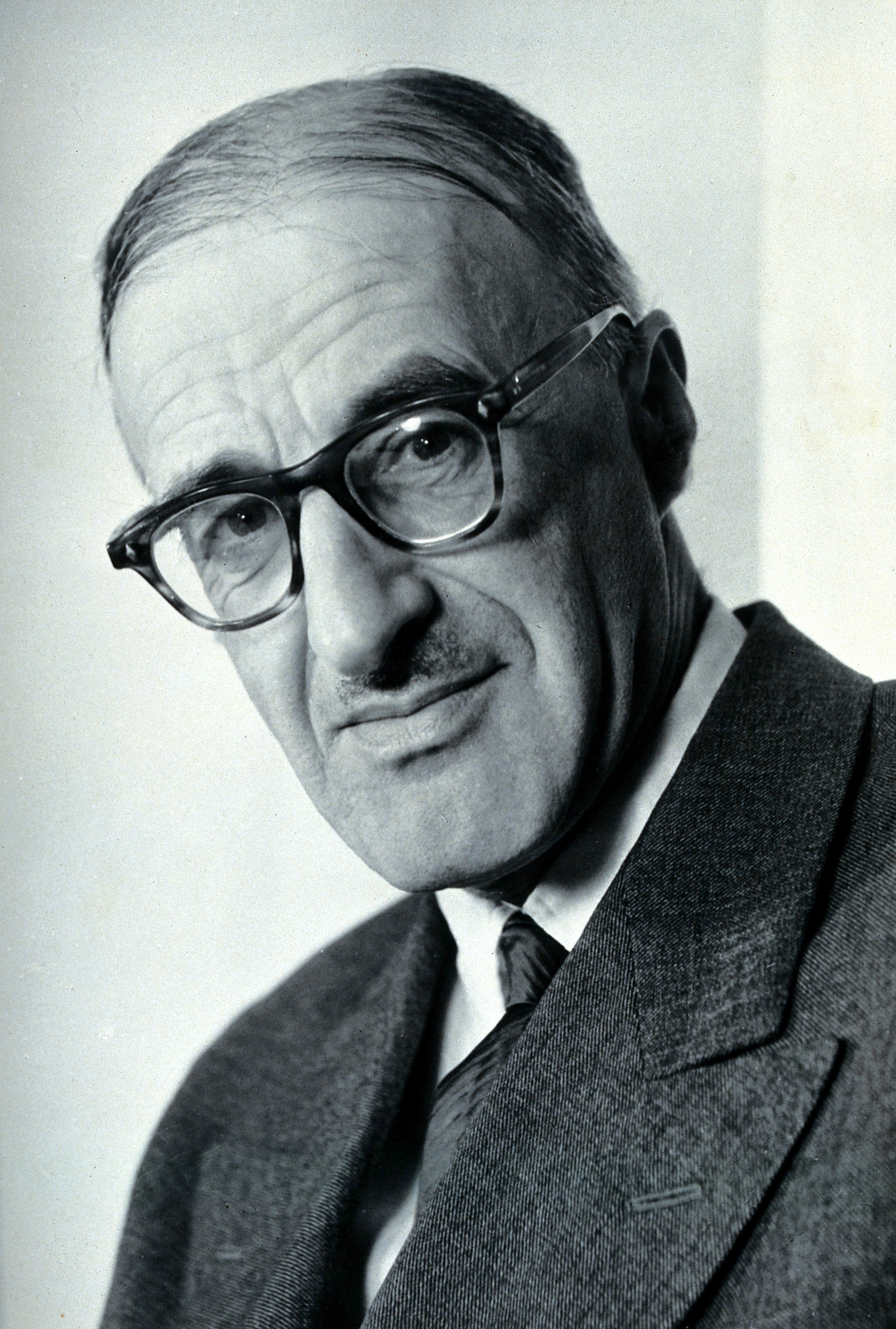
- Born: 29 January 1903; Riga, Russian Empire
- Died: 18 August 1994 (aged 91); Jerusalem, Israel
- Citizenship: Israel
- Education: University of Berlin; University of Basel
- Occupations: Philosopher, chemist
- Organization: Hebrew University of Jerusalem
- Known for: Jewish philosophy Morality; Chemistry; History of science Politics; Ethics
- Notable work: Encyclopaedia Hebraica
- Spouse: Greta
- Children: 6
- Relatives: Nechama Leibowitz (sister); René Leibowitz (cousin); Yoram Yovell (grandson); Ilay Ofran (grandson); Hagit Ofran (granddaughter)
- Awards: Israel Prize (1993); declined

Yeshayahu Leibowitz (Hebrew: ישעיהו ליבוביץ; 29 January 1903 – 18 August 1994) was an Israeli Orthodox Jewish public intellectual and polymath. He was a professor of biochemistry, organic chemistry, and neurophysiology at the Hebrew University of Jerusalem, and an editor of the Encyclopaedia Hebraica, a comprehensive encyclopedia in the Hebrew language. He was known for his outspoken views on politics, religion and Jewish philosophy.

Leibowitz argued that the State of Israel and Zionism had become more sacred than Jewish humanist values and described Israeli conduct in the occupied Palestinian territories as "Judeo-Nazi" in nature while warning of the dehumanizing effect of the occupation on the victims and the oppressors. He was referred to as the "prophet of wrath" due to his frequent criticism of Zionism.

His views elicited significant interest within different groups in Israeli society, including among those who were opposed to them.

== Biography ==
Yeshayahu Leibowitz was born in Riga, Russian Empire (now in Latvia) in 1903, to a religious Zionist family. His father was a lumber trader, and his cousins included philosopher Isaiah Berlin and future chess grandmaster Aron Nimzowitsch. Orientalist scholar Ernst Mainz was a cousin-by-marriage.

Leibowitz grew up speaking German and Yiddish with his mother while conversing in Hebrew with his father. He and his sister were taught by a private tutor, with religious studies handled by their father. As a child, Leibowitz was a fan of the Yiddish works of Sholem Aleichem and Hayim Nahman Bialik. Leibowitz ultimately became fluent in eight languages: German, Yiddish, Hebrew, Russian, French, English, Aramaic, and Latin. In 1919, Leibowitz's family left for Germany due to the Battle of Riga.

=== Career ===
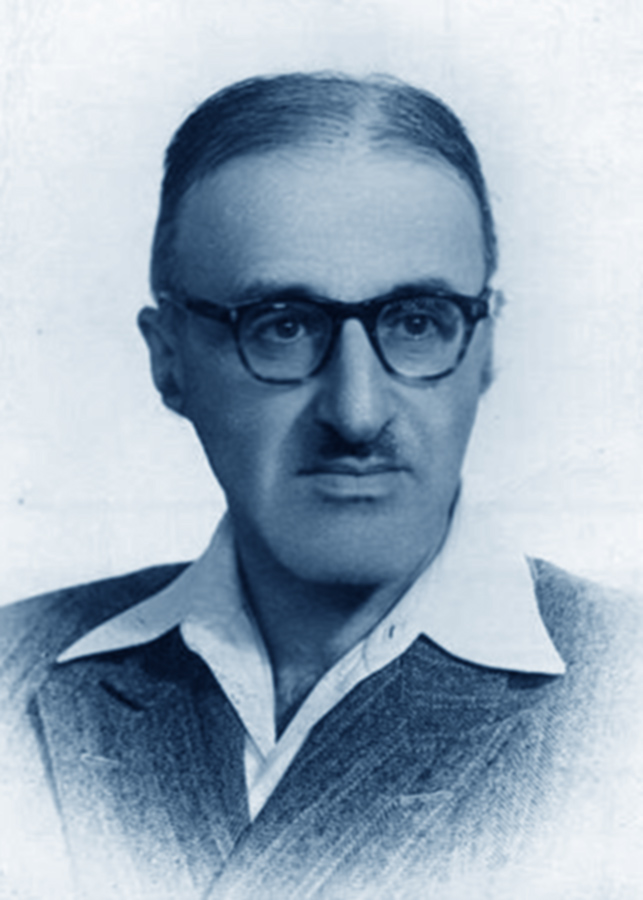
Yeshayahu Leibowitz in the 1930s

Leibowitz studied chemistry and philosophy at the University of Berlin. After completing his doctorate in 1924, he worked for the Kaiser Wilhelm Society before resuming his studies in biochemistry and medicine at the University of Cologne and Heidelberg University. In 1933, he was blocked from finishing his MD in Germany due to his Jewish background and instead completed his studies at the University of Basel.

In 1935, following the introduction of the Nuremberg Laws, Leibowitz immigrated to Mandatory Palestine, settling in Jerusalem. In 1941, he became a professor at the Hebrew University of Jerusalem, first teaching organic chemistry, then biochemistry at the Faculty of Natural Sciences as well as neurophysiology at the Faculty of Medicine as a senior professor since 1952. He was also a guest instructor of Jewish studies in Haifa.

Between 1956 and 1972, Leibowitz served as the editor of the Encyclopaedia Hebraica. Apart from his innumerable articles and essays, Leibowitz authored a wide range of books on philosophy, human values, Jewish thought, the teachings of Maimonides, and politics. Many of his lectures and discourses, including those given as part of the Broadcast University project run by Israeli Army Radio, were subsequently compiled and printed in book form. Leibowitz was a prolific letter writer, and his advice or comment was sought out widely. The first collection of his letters (in Hebrew) was published posthumously.

In the 1949 Knesset election, Leibowitz headed the United List of Religious Workers, which failed to win a seat.

In the mid-1950s, Leibowitz co-founded and led the "Volunteer Line" (שורת המתנדבים) to fight government corruption; and in 1962 he co-led the Public Committee for Nuclear Disarmament.

Leibowitz retired from his teaching position in 1970, but remained an emeritus member of the Department of Philosophy.

=== Personal life and family ===
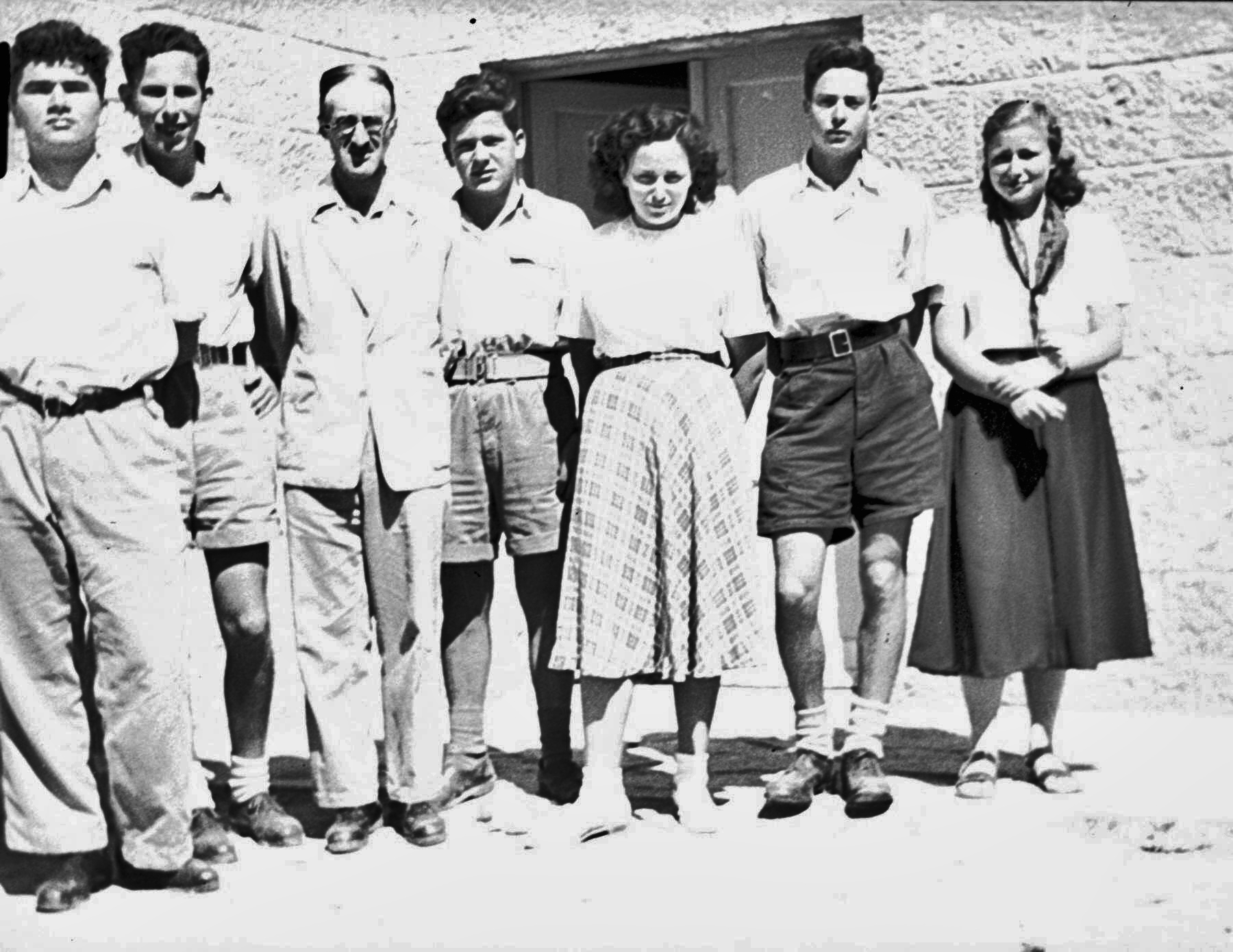
Leibowitz (third from left) with students at Tichon Beit Hakerem, 1947

Leibowitz was married to Greta, with whom he had six children, two of whom died at young ages. His son Elia was chairman of the Tel Aviv University astrophysics department, and the longest-serving director of the Wise Observatory. Another son, Uri, was a professor of medicine at Hadassah University Medical Center. His daughter, Yiska, was a district prosecutor.

Leibowitz's sister, Nechama Leibowitz, was a world-famous biblical scholar. Leibowitz was active until his last day. He died in his sleep on 18 August 1994. Shamai Leibowitz and Hagit Ofran are among his grandchildren.

== Philosophy ==
=== Religion ===
==== Halakha and Mitzvot ====
Leibowitz was an Orthodox Jew who held controversial views on the subject of halakha, or Jewish law. He wrote that the sole purpose of religious commandments was to obey God, and not to receive any kind of reward in this world or the world to come. He maintained that the reasons for religious commandments were beyond man's understanding, as well as irrelevant, and any attempt to attribute emotional significance to the performance of mitzvot was misguided and akin to idolatry. He believed that Jews should perform mitzvot solely for the sake of worshipping God and that although they could also have incidental benefit to the one performing the mitzvah, it would only be a religiously worthy act as long as the motivation was to worship God. He denied the idea of ethical mitzvot, believing that any mitzvot which set out duties towards others were duties based on a person's position before God rather than their position before their fellow man.

The essence of Leibowitz's religious outlook is that a person's faith is his commitment to obey God, meaning God's commandments, and this has nothing to do with a person's image of God. This must be so because Leibowitz thought that God cannot be described, that God's understanding is not man's understanding, and thus, all the questions asked of God are out of place. Leibowitz claimed that a person's decision to believe in God (in other words: to obey him) defines or describes that person, not God.

In his view, prayer for personal reasons, done for the needs of the person praying, was religiously meaningless and even blasphemy, as it seeks to influence God and sees God as an agent for fulfilling human needs. In his eyes, the only legitimate form of prayer was one done to fulfill commandments without any reference to the needs of the person praying.

==== God and Torah ====
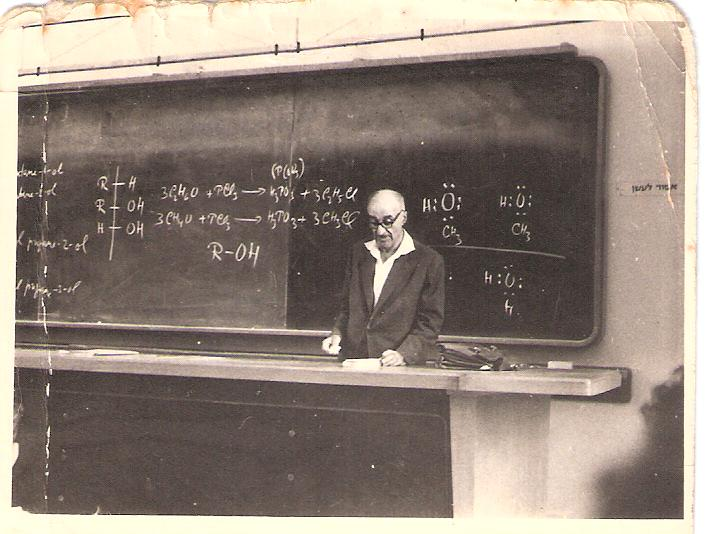
Leibowitz lecturing at Hebrew University

Leibowitz viewed God as transcending all reality as humans know it, believing that as an entity God is incomparable to any other form of reality humans can encounter, and is completely separate from the material world. He viewed human history in the natural world as having no divine significance and rejected the idea that God had set out a divine purpose in history or extended some form of providence over humanity. He did not see Torah as an account of historical and scientific truths, but rather as the source of the mitzvot or commandments on how Jews are to serve God. He believed that the stories presented as factual in the Torah were simply using literary forms within the realm of human comprehension to deliver demands on how to worship God, writing that "from the standpoint of religious faith, the Torah and the entirety of Holy Scripture must be conceived as a demand which transcends the range of human cognition - the demand to know God and serve him - a demand conveyed in various forms of human expression: prescriptions, vision, poetry, prayer, thought, and narrative." He believed that the Torah should not be read as a purely factual historical account, that the inclusion of any actual historical information in the Torah would be merely coincidental, and that all descriptions of God intervening in nature and history were not to be seen as factual but rather interpreted in terms of the messages they carry, as his ideas of God's transcendence denied that there could be any such contact between holiness and the world of the profane.

One result of this approach is that faith, which is a personal commitment to obey God, cannot be challenged by the usual philosophical problem of evil or by historical events that seemingly contradict a divine presence. When someone told Leibowitz that he stopped believing in God after the Holocaust, Leibowitz answered, "Then you never believed in God". If a person stops believing after an awful event, it shows that he only obeyed God because he thought he understood God's plan, or because he expected to see a reward. But "for Leibowitz, religious belief is not an explanation of life, nature, or history, or a promise of a future in this world or another, but a demand". He viewed the Holocaust as having no Jewish religious significance, as such a belief would contradict his ideas of God having no involvement in human affairs.

==== Reform Judaism and Kabbalah ====
He was critical of Reform Judaism, calling it a "historical distortion of the Jewish religion", as well as Kabbalah, seeing them as encouraging people to not perform mitzvot for their own sake but ascribing a stated purpose to them. Reform Judaism teaches the concept of "ethical monotheism" and Judaism as having the mission of being a "light unto the nations" and Kabbalah seeks universal redemption through the performance of mitzvot. This was in contrast to Leibowitz's idea that mitzvot should be performed solely to serve God and not for any other explicit purpose. He rebuked the concept of Tikkun olam, a Kabbalistic idea which remains popular in Reform Judaism as a basis for supporting social justice. Further, he also claimed that placing the State of Israel, Jewish history, and Jewish culture above God was committing Avodah Zara, or idol worship.

=== Mind–body problem ===
Leibowitz maintained the idea that Mind-body problem is inherently unsolvable. He argued that humans cannot rationally understand how a mental event causes a physical event or vice versa, nor can they grasp how such events are consistently and synchronously linked without understanding the original cause of this linkage. He argued that the failure to understand the psychophysical connection reflects a fundamental limitation of human reason and cognition.

== Views and opinions ==
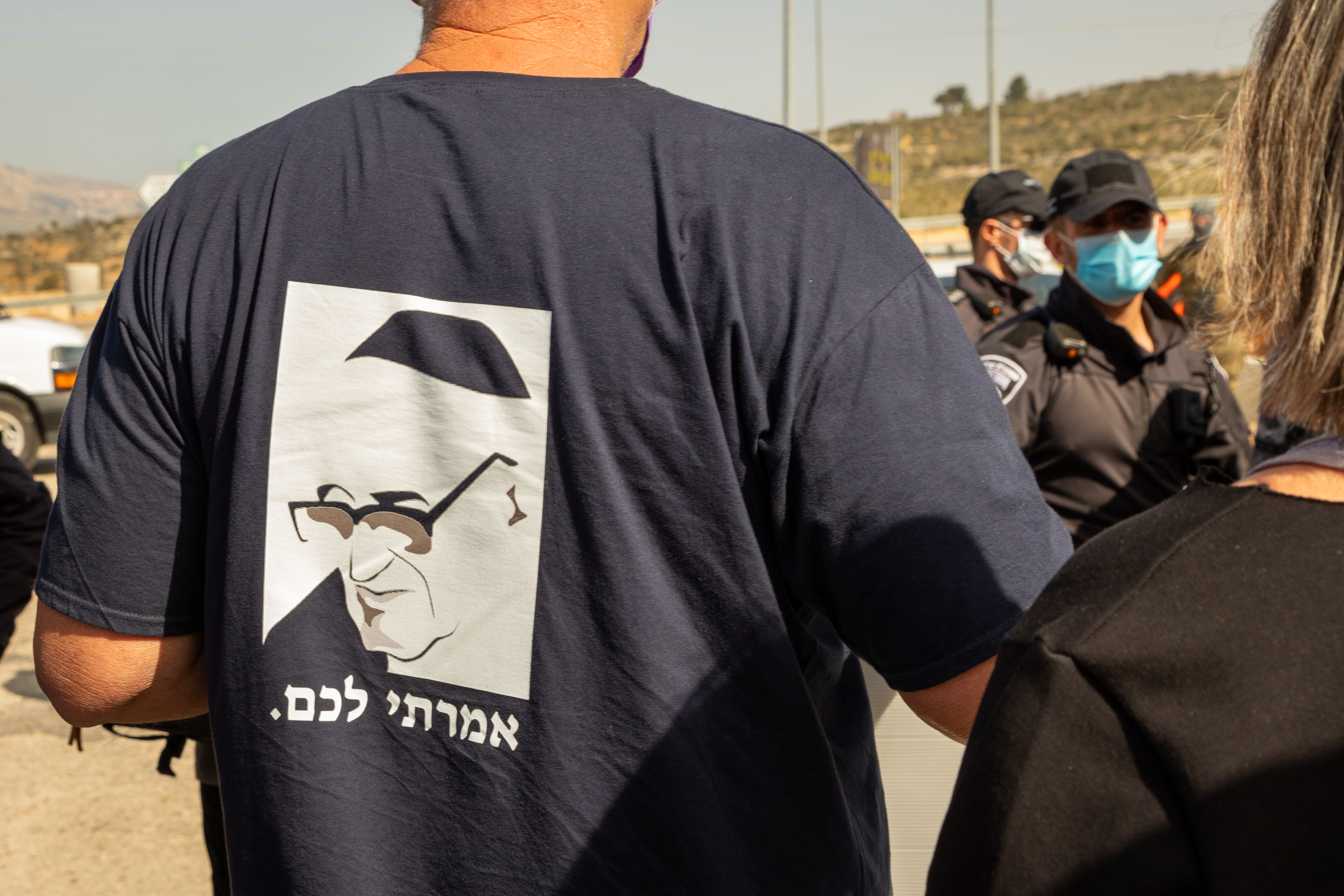
A protester wearing a shirt with a picture of Leibowitz and the caption "I told you" (אמרתי לכם) in a protest for the evacuation of the illegal outpost of Evyatar.

=== Zionism ===
Leibowitz considered himself a religious Zionist and was affiliated with the Mizrachi movement. He viewed Zionism as a "historic opportunity for the renewed political independence of the Jewish people to test the values of Jewish heritage against the realities of modern statehood". He looked favorably on a system of law based on halakha.

Following Israeli Declaration of Independence. Leibowitz was disappointed with the way the religious parties compromised with the secular government. In his view, they had prostituted themselves to the government to guard their own brand of religious sectarianism, subordinating religion to the government. He viewed the Chief Rabbinate of Israel as morally corrupt, calling it "datikan". As a result, he became disillusioned with Zionism as a whole.

Leibowitz later claimed that Zionism is "not an ideology, but a complex of activities undertaken to restore independence to the Jewish nation in its own land - an expression of being fed up with being ruled by the Goyim". However, he claimed that he was never disappointed by the State of Israel itself, but by its injustices committed against the Palestinians.

Following the Qibya massacre in 1953, Leibowitz became increasingly critical of Israeli government policy. He condemned the massacre calling it a moral and political abomination and warned that the use of military force without moral restraint would corrupt the foundations of Israeli society. Leibowitz also argued that such acts betrayed Judaism's ethical legacy and undermined the moral integrity of the nascent state.

In 1956, Leibowitz wrote an article in Haaretz following the initial failure of the authorities to punish the perpetrators of the Kafr Qasim massacre, commenting with sharp irony that, in the name of the justice Israel claims to uphold, one might as well call for the Nuremberg laws to be overturned and the convicted Nazi officials to be exonerated, since they too had only followed orders from their superiors.

Leibowitz was harshly critical of Israeli policies following the 1982 Lebanon War. He repeatedly called for Israelis to refuse to serve in the occupied territories, and warned that Israel was turning its soldiers into "Judeo-Nazis", writing that if "the law ... can allow the use of torture as a way of getting confessions out of prisoners, then this testifies to a Nazi mentality." He supported a unilateral Israeli withdrawal from the occupied territories.

In a 1991 speech in Haifa, he declared that "A Nazi-like mentality also exists in our country. That is a fact."

==== Israeli leadership ====
In 1966, Leibowitz harshly criticized David Ben-Gurion, claiming that, “he ruled his party and the political life in Israel with total control”. He portrayed Ben-Gurion as deceitful and expansionist. He wrote that although Ben-Gurion publicly stated in the Knesset that he opposed a preemptive war against Egypt, he secretly worked to plan one and later declared an expansion of Israel's borders, referring to it as “The Third Kingdom of Israel,” extending as far as the island of Tiran. Moreover, he was critical of the nuclear project started during Ben-Gurion's premiership, saying that it had been established “without the knowledge of the Knesset’s Foreign Affairs and Defense Committee." He wrote that Ben-Gurion and his aides sought to conceal the issue from the Israeli public by suppressing press coverage. Earlier, in 1960, Leibowitz had led the Committee for Denuclearization of the Middle East, alongside the politician Eliezer Livneh.

In an interview with Ma'ariv in January of the following year, following controversy surrounding his claims, Leibowitz said: “I think that [Ben-Gurion] is the biggest catastrophe that ever happened to the Jewish people and the State of Israel.” Ben-Gurion was furious but pretended not to care.

==== Religious Zionism ====
Leibowitz was harshly critical of Religious Zionism. claiming that they "have deified the nation, adopted patriotism as their faith and made the state their religion. Their concern is not with the Jewish people as (potentially or in actuality) the People of the Torah, but with the Torah as serving the interests of the nation and the state". and expressed the fear that it could lead to a civil war.

=== Messianism ===
Leibowitz did not believe in the Messianic Age as traditionally understood: "the profound religious meaning of the messianic idea consists in presenting a goal and a purpose towards which one must strive eternally. The Messiah is essentially he who always will come, he is the eternal future. The Messiah who comes, the Messiah of the present, is inevitably the false Messiah." He viewed the expectations of a literal Messianic Age as blurring the line between "religious faith aimed at the service of God and psychological yearnings for the satisfaction of human aspirations."

=== Israeli occupation ===
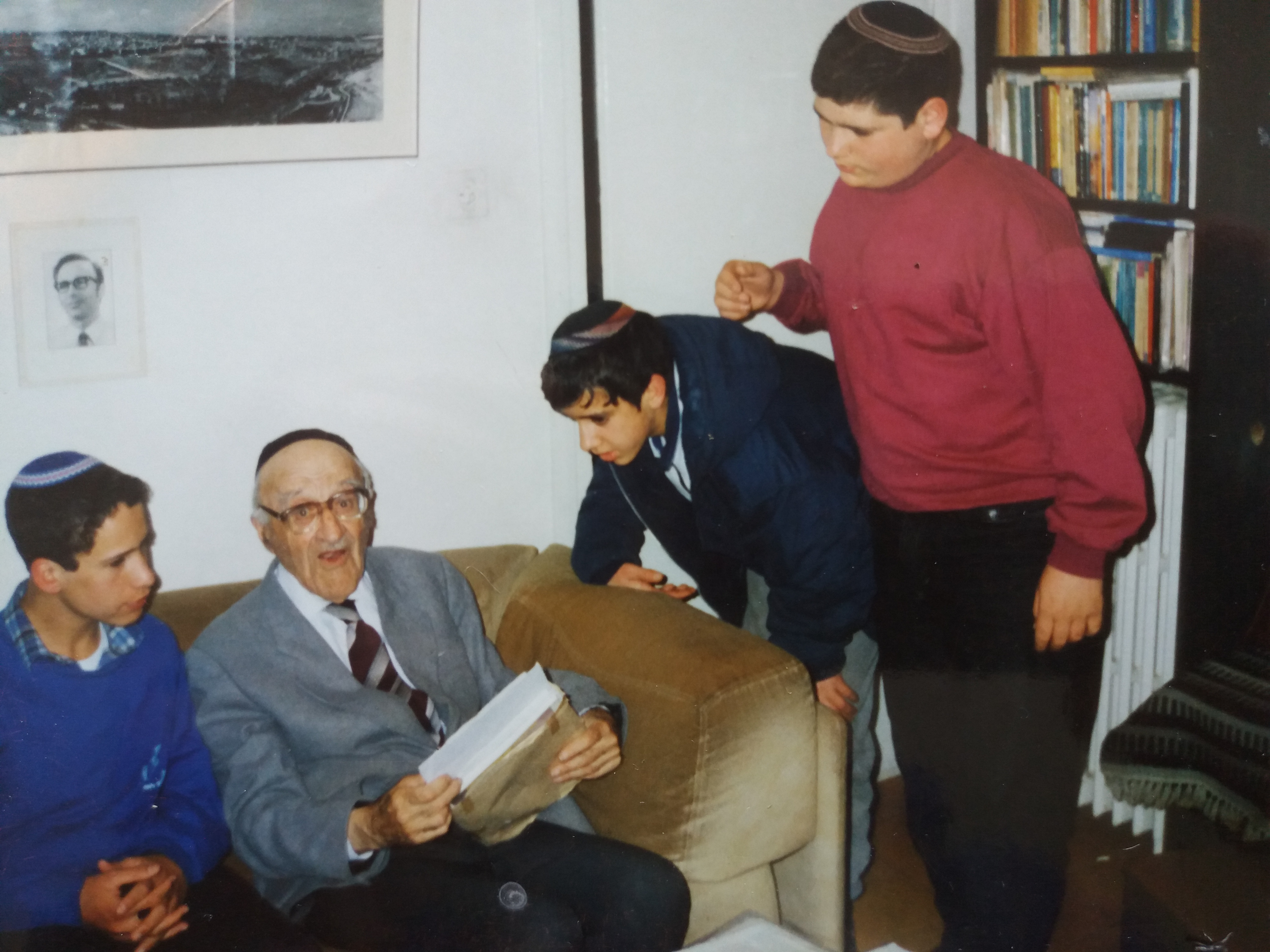
Yeshayahu Leibowitz lecturing

Leibowitz was among the first Israeli intellectuals to state immediately after the 1967 Six-Day War that if the occupation continued, this would lead to the decline in moral stature. Leibowitz warned that victory can corrode democracy.

In a 1968 essay titled "The Territories", Leibowitz warned of a bleak future:

Rule over the occupied territories would have social repercussions. After a few years there would be no Jewish workers or Jewish farmers. The Arabs would be the working people and the Jews the administrators, inspectors, officials, and police — mainly secret police. A state ruling a hostile population of 1.5 to 2 million foreigners would necessarily become a secret-police state, with all that this implies for education, free speech, and democratic institutions. The corruption characteristic of every colonial regime would also prevail in the state of Israel. The administration would have to suppress Arab insurgency on the one hand and acquire Arab Quislings on the other. There is also good reason to fear that the Israel Defense Force, which has been until now a people’s army, would, as a result, transform into an army of occupation, degenerate, and its commanders, who will have become military governors, resemble their colleagues in other nations. Out of concern for the Jewish people and its state we have no choice but to withdraw from the territories and their population of one and a half million Arabs.

Following Israel's Operation Bayonet, Yeshayahu Leibowitz stated in a public speech at Ben-Gurion University of the Negev: "Whoever condemns the terrorism of the Palestinian organizations must at the same time condemn the terrorism of the Israeli occupation of the West Bank and Gaza". In 1980, Leibowitz delivered another speech in which he addressed various issues related to the Israeli occupation, including Palestinian political violence, which he described as "natural consequence of colonial rule":

The corruption of occupation does not stop with the occupiers - it also deforms the lives of the occupied. Today, virtually every Arab living under Israeli rule, whether in the state or the territories, is - either in practice or in principle—aligned with the PLO. Some may even be driven to acts of terrorism. I cannot bring myself to moral outrage over this fact, because such resistance is a natural consequence of colonial rule. Occupation breeds rebellion; rebellion breeds terrorism; terrorism provokes counter-terrorism; and the cycle continues. Anyone who truly and sincerely opposes this unfolding tragedy, and who fears the devastation it will bring upon both the Israeli-Jewish and Palestinian-Arab peoples, must recognize this: the only way to avert disaster is through the complete and unconditional end of the occupation.

In the 1970s and 1980s, Leibowitz continued to strongly condemn Israel's ongoing control over the territories captured by the IDF in the Six-Day War. With the outbreak of the Lebanon War, he began urging civil disobedience, calling on soldiers to refuse service in the occupied territories.

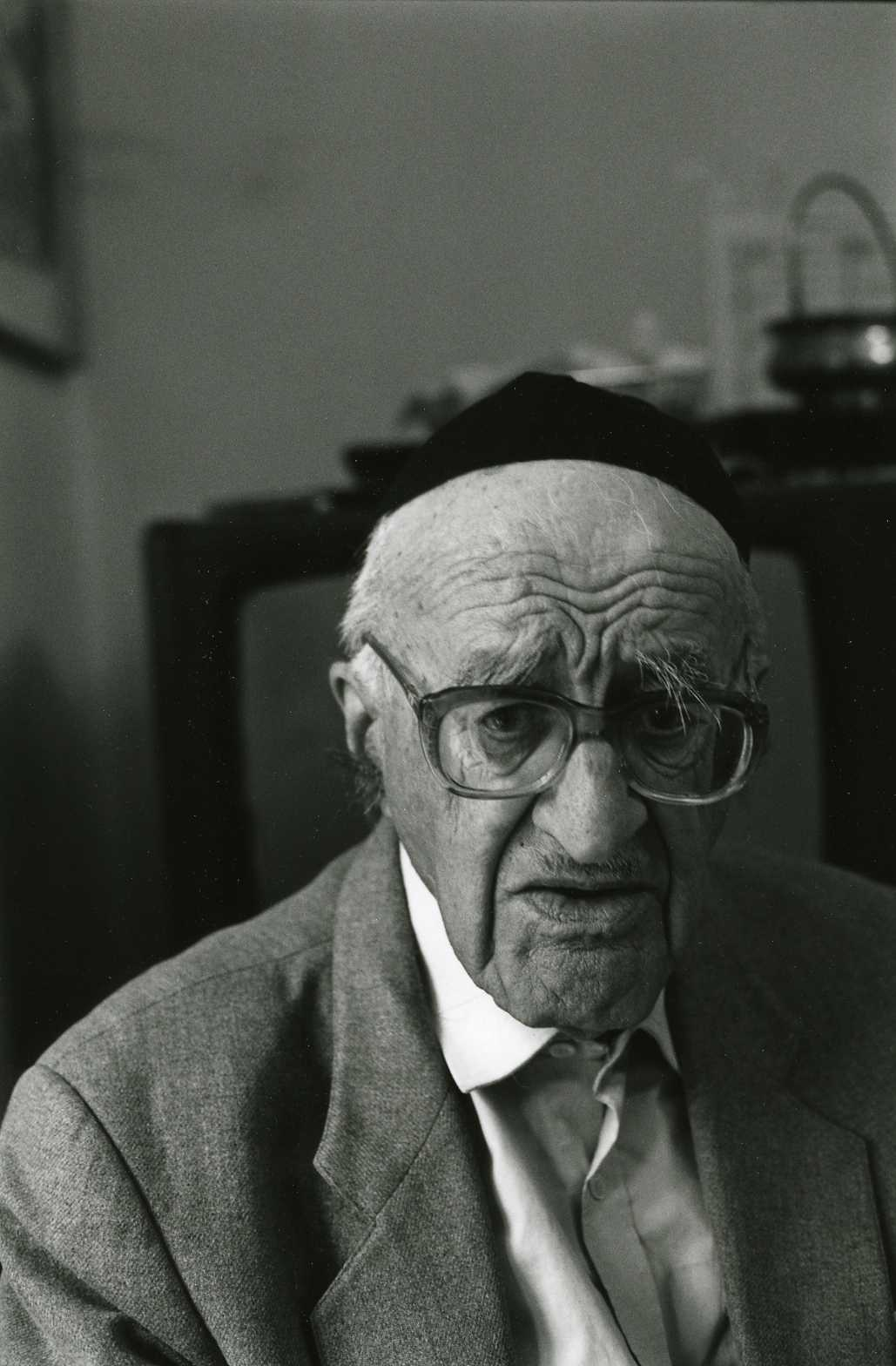
Yeshayahu Leibowitz

==== Israeli settlement ====
On 27 September 1985, Leibowitz interviewed on the newspaper Haaretz and called to take up arms against the Israeli settlers in the West Bank:

The murderers beyond the Green Line who settled in Judea and Samaria have weapons. Therefore, I call on you to take up arms - to take up arms against them before they throw you into concentration camps like leper dogs. Yes, take up arms.

=== Religion and state ===
Leibowitz believed in the separation of state and religion, and held that mixing the two corrupted faith. He wrote that: "For Judaism, only God is holy, whereas country, nation, and state lack that status. The state is not a value in itself."

From 1959 onward, Leibowitz advocated for the separation of religion and state, and did so by establishing the "The New Regime" (המשטר החדש) political movement. He condemned the veneration of Jewish shrines, cynically referring to the Western Wall as the Discotel (a play on the words "discothèque" and "Kotel", a transliterated Hebrew word which literally means "wall", but capitalized refers to the Western Wall).

=== Homosexuality and gender ===
Leibowitz maintained that the state should neither condemn nor restrict same-sex relationships, despite the Halakhic prohibition against them, and that homosexual individuals should nevertheless strive to remain observant Jews. Leibowitz was also an advocate of increased gender equality in Jewish practice, writing that: "The halakhic decisions in Judaism barring women from public office tell us more about what actually was the case than about what ought to be" and arguing that men and women should study the Torah together.

== Awards and recognition ==
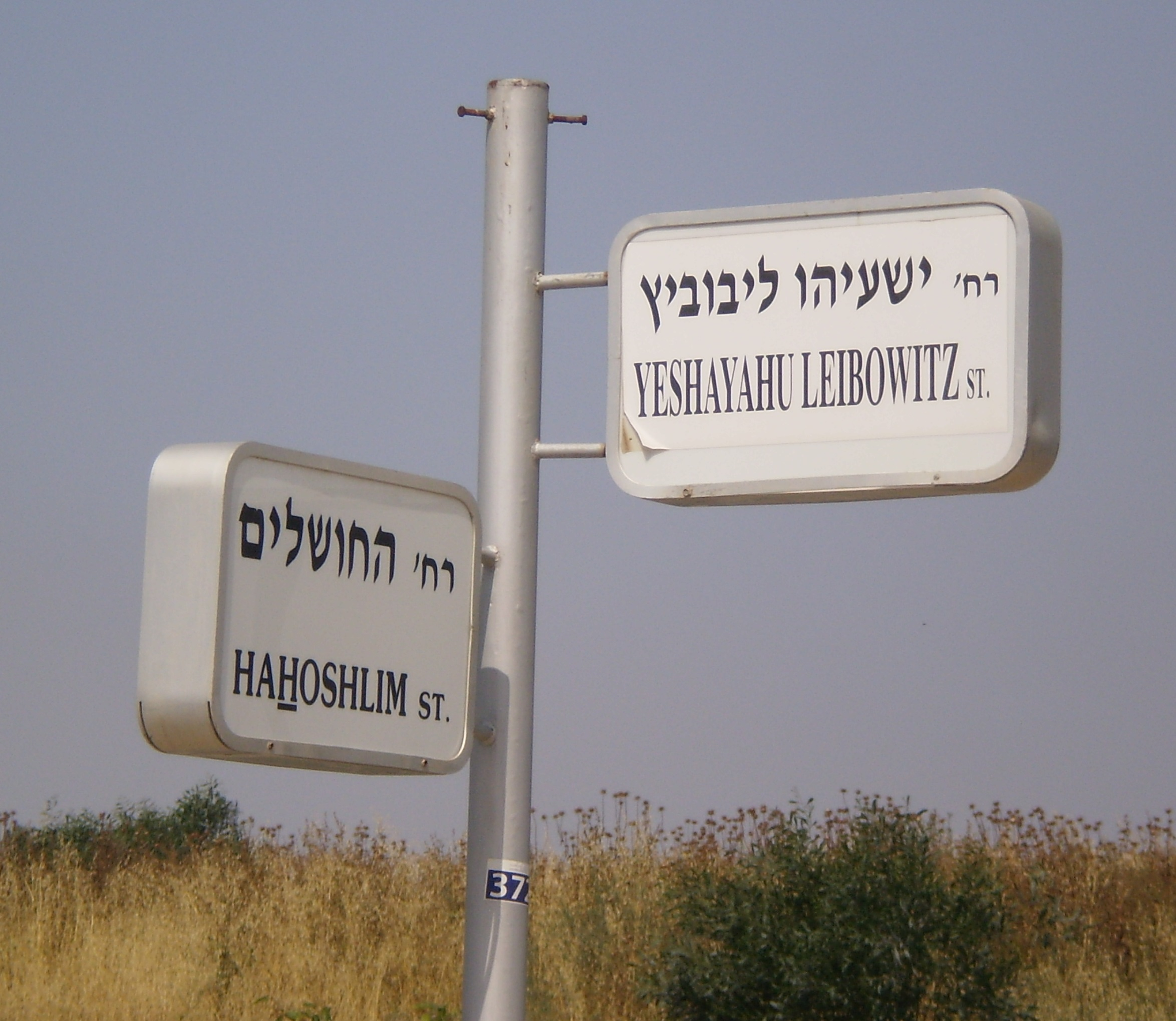
Yeshayhu Leibowitz street in Herzliya

In an interview in Haaretz newspaper, Carlo Strenger, who knew Leibowitz personally, stated:

Because of his provocativeness, it's easy to miss Leibowitz's profound moral seriousness and the great relevance of his thought today. He is often pigeonholed as belonging to the extreme left, which is a mistake. Leibowitz, never willing to bow to collective pressure, was the most unlikely of combinations: On the one hand he was a libertarian, an extreme form of classical liberalism, and believed that human beings should be free to determine their way of life without any state interference. On the other hand, he was an ultra-Orthodox Jew who insisted that the state and religion must be separated completely to avoid corrupting each other.

In 1993, Leibowitz was selected for the Israel Prize for Lifetime Achievement. Before the award ceremony, Leibowitz was invited to speak to the Israel Council for Israeli–Palestinian Peace, where his controversial remarks calling upon Israeli soldiers to refuse orders triggered outrage (and Yitzhak Rabin had threatened to boycott the ceremony). The jury convened to discuss the possibility of withdrawing the prize, but Leibowitz himself announced that he would refuse to accept it, because he did not want to create antagonism when receiving the prize.

In 2003, Haaretz journalist Avi Lavie wrote an article about Yeshayahu Leibowitz controversial claims, under the title "Yeshayahu Leibowitz is alive - on the 100th anniversary of his birth".

== Bibliography ==
- יהדות עם יהודי ומדינת ישראל, Yeshayahu Leibowitz, 1976
- שיחות על פרקי־אבות ועל הרמב"ם Yeshayahu Leibowitz, 1976
- חמישה ספרי אמונה, Yeshayahu Leibowitz, 1979
- שיחות על מדע וערכים, Yeshayahu Leibowitz, 1985
- שיחות על 'שמונה פרקים' לרמב"ם, Yeshayahu Leibowitz, 1986
- ישעיהו ליבוביץ. על עולם ומלואו : שיחות עם מיכאל ששר, Yeshayahu Leibowitz, Michael Shashar, 1987
- The Faith of Maimonides, Yeshayahu Leibowitz, 1987
- עם, ארץ, מדינה, Yeshayahu Leibowitz, 1991
- Judaism, Human Values, and the Jewish State, Yeshayahu Leibowitz, Eliezer Goldman (Editor), 1992
- רציתי לשאול אותך, פרופ' ליבוביץ... : מכתבים אל ישעיהו ליבוביץ וממנו, Yeshayahu Leibowitz, 1992
- שיחות על הפילוסופיה של המדע, Yeshayahu Leibowitz and Joseph Agassi, 1996
- Accepting the Yoke of Heaven: Commentary on the Weekly Torah Portion, Yeshayahu Leibowitz, Shmuel Himelstein (Translator), 2002
- בין מדע לפילוסופיה: מאמרים, הרצאות ושיחות, Yeshayahu Leibowitz, 2002
- גוף ונפש: מוח יסודות הבעיה הפסיכופטית, Yeshayahu Leibowitz
- חמישה ספרי אמונה, Yeshayahu Leibowitz
- ויכוחים על אמונה ופילוסופיה, Yeshayahu Leibowitz, Aviezer Ravitzki
- הערות לפרשיות השבוע, Yeshayahu Leibowitz
