= The Broadcast (band) =

American soul musical group

Caitlin Krisko and The Broadcast
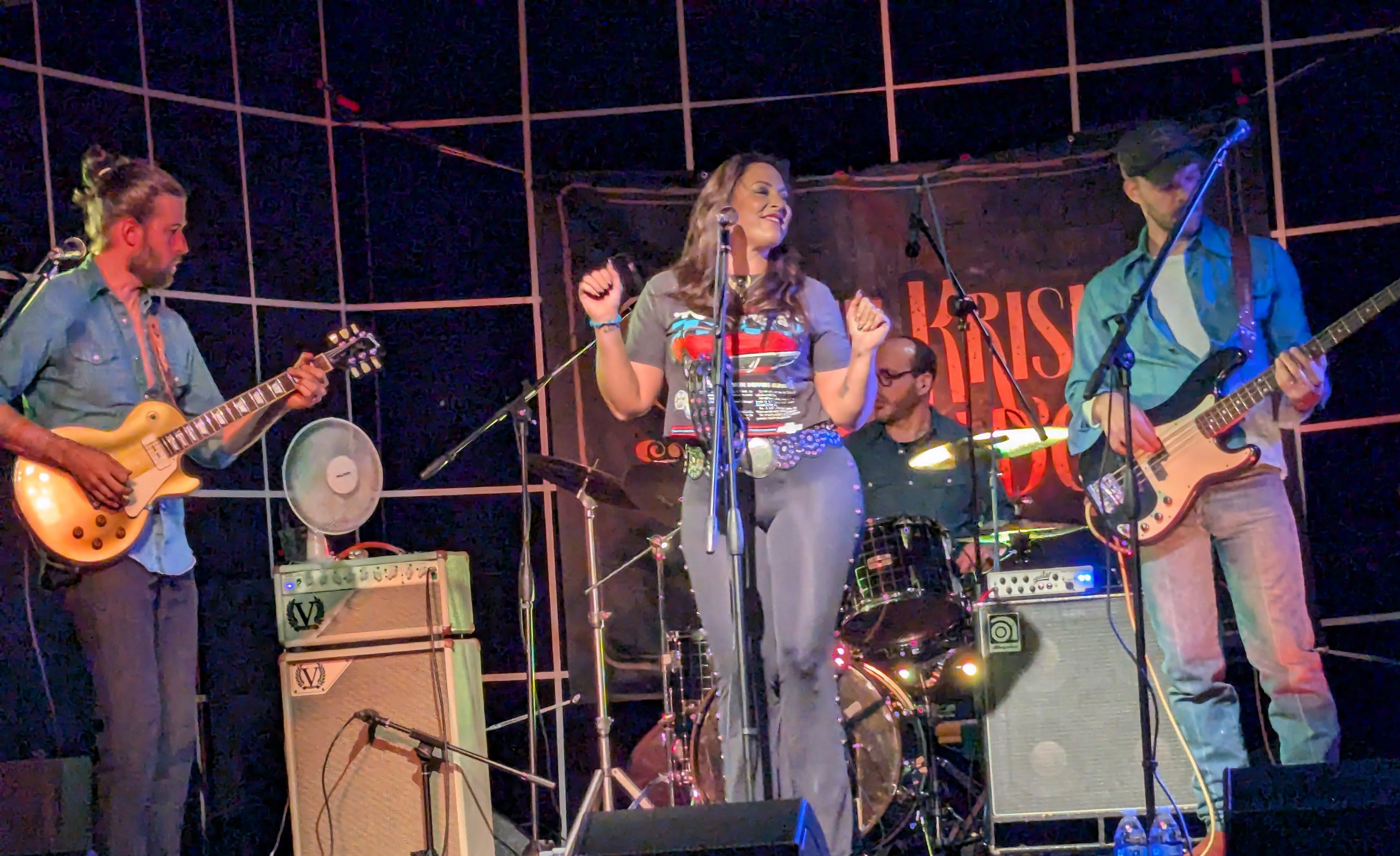
- Caitlin Krisko and The Broadcast, December 2025

Background information
- Origin: Asheville, North Carolina, U.S.A
- Genres: Blues; Rhythm and blues; Soul; Blues rock
- Years active: 2010–present
- Members: Caitlin Krisko (vocals); Aaron Austin (guitar); Mike Runyon (keys); William Seymour (bass); Tyler Housholder (percussion); Michael W. Davis (drums)
- Website: www.caitlinkriskoandthebroadcast.com

The Broadcast is an American blues band from Asheville, North Carolina composed of Caitlin Krisko (vocals), Aaron Austin (guitar), Mike Runyon (keys), William Seymour (bass), Tyler Housholder (percussion), and Michael W. Davis (drums).

Formed in the early 2010s by vocalist and songwriter Caitlin Krisko, originally from Detroit, she began her musical career in New York City before relocating to Asheville, North Carolina. After moving south, Krisko assembled a group of regional musicians to create The Broadcast, blending soul, rock and Americana influences. The band gained early attention in Asheville for its energetic shows and Krisko’s powerful, blues-leaning vocal delivery.

In 2013 the band released its debut album, Dodge the Arrow, produced by Grammy Award–winner Jim Scott. The record helped the group expand nationally and secure opening slots for acts including Grace Potter, Marcus King, and the Tedeschi Trucks Band. Touring across the United States strengthened their presence in the Americana and roots-rock scenes.

The band underwent several line-up changes throughout the mid-2010s, with Krisko remaining the primary creative force. Their second album, From the Horizon (2016), produced by Eric Sarafin, incorporated Southern rock and modern soul influences. They appeared at the FloydFest.

In the late 2010s and early 2020s the group adopted the name Caitlin Krisko and The Broadcast to emphasise Krisko’s central creative role. During this period they released a series of singles that showcased a polished soul-rock sound and expanded their streaming and radio presence. International touring in the early 2020s helped broaden their audience beyond the United States.

In December 2025 they toured the UK to promote their EP "Everything I need"
