= Yirmiyahu Yovel =

Israeli philosopher

- יִרְמְיָהוּ יוֹבֵל
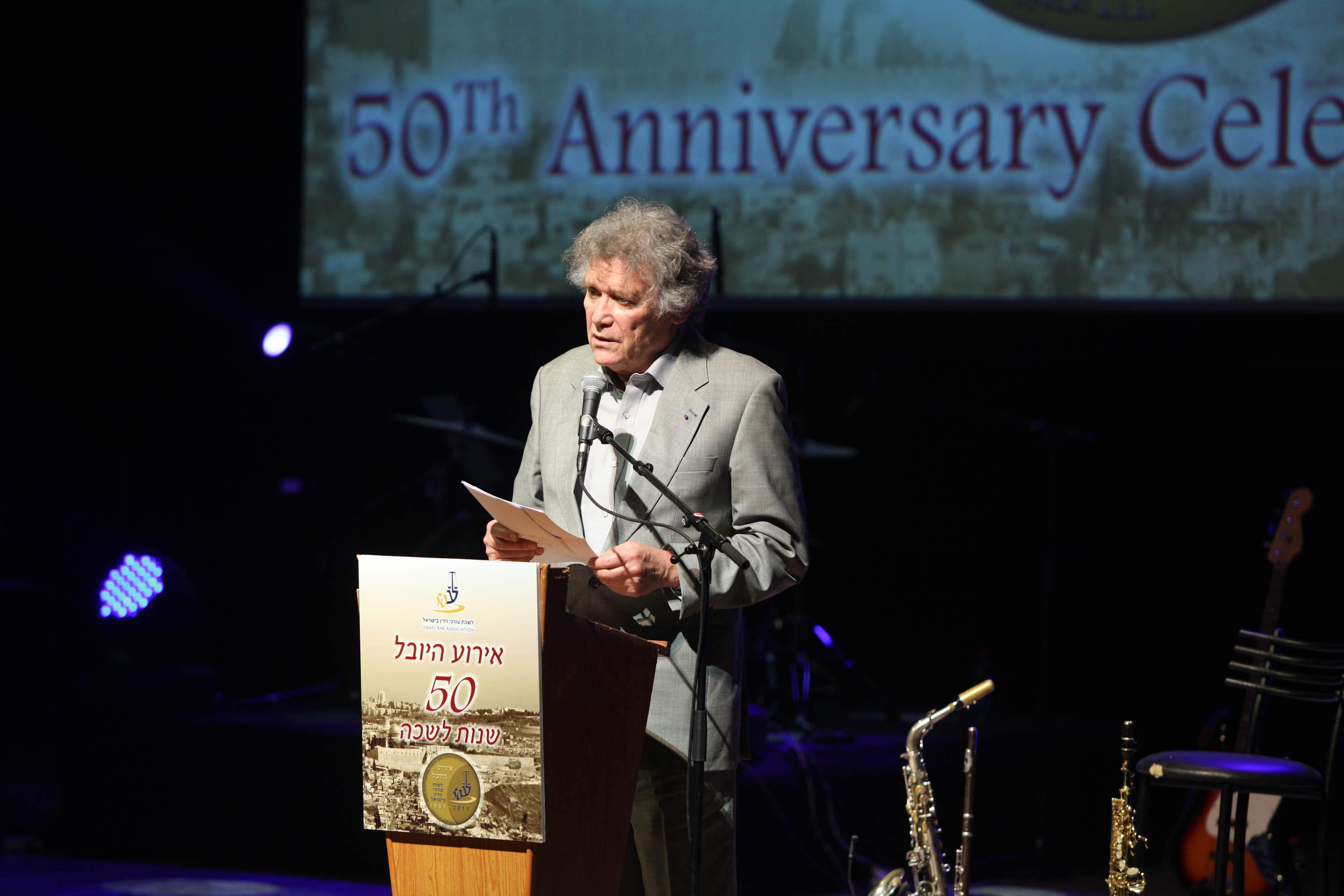
- Born: 20 October 1935; Haifa, Mandatory Palestine
- Died: 10 June 2018 (aged 82); Israel

Yirmiyahu Yovel (Hebrew: יִרְמְיָהוּ יוֹבֵל; 20 October 1935 – 10 June 2018) was an Israeli philosopher and public intellectual. He was Professor Emeritus of philosophy at the Hebrew University of Jerusalem and at the New School for Social Research in New York. Yovel had also been a political columnist in Israel, cultural and political critic and a frequent presence in the media. Yovel was a laureate of the Israel Prize in philosophy and officier of the French order of the Palme académique. His books were translated into English, French, German, Spanish, Portuguese, Rumanian, Hebrew, Korean and Japanese. Yovel was married to Shoshana Yovel, novelist and community organizer, and they had a son, Jonathan Yovel, poet and law professor, and a daughter, Ronny, classical musician, TV host and family therapist.

== Biography ==
=== Education and early philosophical development ===
Born in Haifa, Mandatory Palestine, Yirmiyahu Yovel graduated in 1953 from the Hebrew Reali School in Haifa. Following his mandatory military service he studied philosophy and economics at the Hebrew University of Jerusalem, completing his B.A. in 1961 and M.A. in 1964. He supported his studies as radio news editor and presenter. However, he declined a permanent career in broadcasting and went to the Sorbonne and Princeton University to complete his philosophical studies. In 1968 he earned his PhD from the Hebrew University. His adviser was Nathan Rothenstreich.

Yovel came to the university driven by existential philosophical concerns and suspicious of rationalism. Upholding individual subjectivity, young Yovel was estranged from the collectivist ideals and political ideologies of the time (including the socialist-Zionist ethos), because of their demand to monopolize and politicize all intellectual concerns. Religion, too, was not the answer, but rather an escape. Yovel has shared from the start Nietzsche's radical drive to existential lucidity, which can be emotionally taxing but also liberating.

It was, in particular, Kant's program of critical reason (though not its actual execution), and the concept of finite rationality that provided Yovel with the terms for a constructive critique of rationalism, one that recognizes rationality as indispensable for human life and culture, even while taking its finitude more radically than Kant's, by admitting its fallibility, open-endedness, and non-absolute nature.

Yovel holds that the history of philosophy is embedded in most philosophical discourse, and that often it contains issues and insights that can be fruitfully contemporized by a method of immanent reconstruction. His own philosophical position can be described as "a philosophy of immanence," which, following Spinoza, views the immanent world as all there is and as the sole possible source of social and political normativity. The latter theme was extensively probed in his two-volume Spinoza and Other Heretics (Princeton, 1989), which traces the idea of immanence back to Spinoza and follows its adventures in later thinkers of modernity from Kant and Hegel to Nietzsche and beyond.

Yovel was to return as visiting professor both to Princeton University (1970–71) and the Sorbonne (1978–80), among other foreign appointments. His years on both sides of the Atlantic helped shape Yovel's attitude towards Anglo-American analytic philosophy. He shares its demand for clarity and precision – this was recognized as a hallmark of his writing – but criticized its often scholastic tendencies and a-historical approach.

Following his academic and public activity Yirmiyahu Yovel became a prominent voice in Israeli intellectual life. His numerous columns in major papers, mostly Ha'aretz and Yediot Aharonot, probed public attitudes and government policies. He was an early advocate of an independent Palestinian state alongside Israel, and strongly opposed the settlement activity in the West Bank and Gaza as politically wrong and motivated by false Messianism.

=== Journalism and public activity ===
Yovel's involvement in journalism started in his student days. In 1960–64 he worked for radio Israel and co-founded its weekly news magazine. In 1967 he participated in the project of creating an independent Israeli broadcasting authority, serving two terms on its council. Later he edited the first political documentaries of Israel TV, and during 1975–1978 he edited and hosted 30 major TV programs on social and political issues (drugs, gay liberation, divorce, adoption, violence in sports, Arab land rights; the right to die, etc.). His viewers also remembered him as a military reporter in the Sinai frontline in both the 1967 and 1973 war. In 1973 he was among the few journalists who insisted on reporting the truth about Israel's military setbacks in the early stage of the war.

After Labor's historic defeat in 1977, he joined "Circle 77," a group of intellectuals that tried to reform the Labor party, but found himself unfit for party politics. Henceforth he focused on the written press, publishing scores of political columns until the 1990s.

=== Academic career ===
Most of Yovel's career took place at the Hebrew University, where he served in various academic posts and held the Shulman Chair of Philosophy. During that time, he also visited and lectured in numerous universities and institutes worldwide including Columbia, Hamburg, Milan, Oxford, Paris IV ("Paris-Sorbonne"), and others. In 1994 he accepted an appointment to teach annually one-term at the Graduate Faculty of the New School for Social Research which became his "second academic home." He was then nominated to the inaugural Hans Jonas Chair in Philosophy, from which he retired in 2010.

In 1986, Yovel founded the Jerusalem Spinoza Institute with a dual intention – to foster Spinoza scholarship, and to promote public education around ideas associated with Spinoza (such as democracy, secularism, and tolerance) both as all- European thinker and as an emblematic figure of Jewish modernity).

In 2000 Yovel won the Israel Prize for his achievements in philosophy. His thank-you address on behalf of his fellow laureates was entitled "A Report on the State of Reason." Reason is alive and breathing, Yovel reported, but is besieged by inner and outer enemies. Reason's "inner enemy" is its over-ambitious tendency to exceed its limits and control, and three "external enemies": mysticism, global commercial culture, and post-modern radical critique. Yovel argued that these challenges can be tackled by a sober attitude, committed to reason all while accepting its fallibility, finitude, and lack of absolute character. This is rationality "on a human scale," rather than a secular replica of religion.

== Publications ==
Yirmiyahu Yovel's published numerous scholarly articles and several books, among them Kant and the Problem of History (Princeton 1980,86) Spinoza and Other Heretics (Princeton 1989), Dark Riddle: Hegel, Nietzsche and the Jews (Polity 1996) and The Other Within: The Marranos (Princeton 2013). He translated into Hebrew two major philosophical classics (Spinoza's Ethics and Kant's Critique of Pure Reason) with systematic introductions, and edited several collective books, including a 5-volume encyclopedia of Jewish modern secular culture. Yovel's credits as journalist include dozens of press columns and 30 major TV programs.

=== Kant and the Renewal of Metaphysics ===
Yovel's first book, based on his PhD dissertation, was Kant and the Renewal of Metaphysics (1974, in Hebrew.) While Kant had been often held to have destroyed metaphysics, Yovel's book argues that Kant's actual program was to renew it, by replacing the old dogmatic metaphysics with a new critical one. Metaphysical questions are deeply significant even when they exceed the range of legitimate answers. To either repress the questions or to pretend answering them is equally irrational. Reason in Kant has a metaphysical interest and a critical interest that are equally indispensable, yet contradict each other in the absence of a critique. The critical turn resolves this antinomy in two stages. First, it establishes a system of synthetic a-priori categories and principles that functions as a valid metaphysics of the immanent (empirical) domain; and, secondly, in the Dialectic, it re-orients the metaphysical drive from its search of empty, illusory objects back into the empirical world, and makes us realize our fundamental finitude, as well as the endlessly open horizons within this world which we can explore.

By metaphysics Kant understood a system of supersensible elements that (1) determines the entities in the sensible world, and (2) concerns the meaning of their being. The Kantian synthetic a-priori categories and principles fulfill the first role, but do so critically, since they are not supersensible objects existing in themselves but are only ingredients in the synthesis of empirical objects. As such they also determine what it means for empirical objects to be (namely, to be a synthesis of sense perceptions linked by the categories.) The a priori system is thus not only an epistemology, but equally an ontology of finite, natural beings.

The book also highlights the dynamic, self-driving nature of Kantian reason (which Yovel sometimes calls "erotic" in the Platonic sense). Human rationality is not a mere calculus in Kant but a goal-oriented activity, which projects its own inherent ends and strives to realize them. Finally, the book describes Kant's method as the self-explication of reason, which depends upon its own history, including a series of collapses, and culminates in a critical revolution.

=== Kant and the Philosophy of History ===
Yovel's major work on Kant was to become his Kant and the Philosophy of History (Princeton 1980, 1986; French 1989). Kant's historical thought had for a long time been ignored, or dismissed as marginal and inconsistent. Yovel's work was instrumental in reversing this outlook. The book goes beyond Kant's customary moral teaching, which revolves on the formal and personal characteristics of morality, to uncover a second, material tier in Kant's practical philosophy, in which the moral will becomes a world-shaping will: the will is not satisfied with its personal morality alone, but works to reshape the entire social-historical world as "a moral totality". The will does not only strive to make itself good, but to reshape its world in its own image—to see its moral goals embodied in the actual world's ways and institutions. This makes possible a critical philosophy of history, and of particular areas within it—politics, law, social ethics, moral education, and a religion of reason.

The lever leading to the second stage is Kant's concept of "The Highest Good" and the imperative to promote it. A close analysis of this concept leads Yovel to interpret it as the Kantian regulative idea of history, an ideal that combines maximal morality (personal and institutional, ethical and political) with universal well-being and prosperity. Kant even calls the historical task "the ultimate end of creation itself"), thus suggesting that moral history, in which humans change themselves and reform the world, is the only possible justification of there being a world and a human race, which otherwise would be utterly contingent and meaningless.

In method, the book is not a narrative commentary but a systematic reconstruction. While relying on careful textual analyses, it organizes the material in relation to the inner logic and latent implications of Kant's positions, which allow Yovel to draw new conclusions that shed light on unknown aspects in his philosophy.

The book had strong echoes which reversed the traditional outlook. Today there is even talk of Kant's "historical turn", a concept unheard of in the past). A noted German philosopher, director of the Institut für Sozialforschung (Institute for Social Research, the institutional home of the Frankfurt School and critical theory) recently described the book's impact:

"When I first read Yirmiyahu Yovel's marvelous book on Kant and the Philosophy of History almost twenty years ago, I learned how one should approach the task of interpreting classical texts: Starting from the identification of a central problem in a philosopher`s writings, one must try rearrange the elements of the proposed solution until a new idea emerges that goes beyond the original author's explicit intentions. Because I was extremely impressed by this method the way it was applied to Kant's systematic thought, I not only became a regular and eager reader of Yirmiyahu Yovel's publications, but I also tried to emulate this mode of thinking in my own work" (—Axel Honneth, 2010).

=== Spinoza and other Heretics ===
Yovel's best-known book is Spinoza and other Heretics, (Princeton 1989), a diptych in two volumes that offers a new interpretation of the existential origins of Spinoza's intellectual revolution (Vol. I) and its developments in later thinkers of modernity (Vol. II). Spinoza appealed to Yovel primarily by his radical principle of immanence, which Yovel sees as paradigmatic of much of modern thought, and by his striking personal case. No modern thinker before Nietzsche has gone as far as Spinoza in shedding all historical religion and all horizons of transcendence. In wondering what had enabled Spinoza to tear himself so drastically from the Western theistic tradition, Yovel did not turn directly to the rational arguments that drove Spinoza, but looked first for the historico-existential situation that cleared the mental space for those arguments to emerge and take hold in the mind.

The answer, Yovel suggested, is linked to the dualities and confused religious identity of the peculiar Jewish group from which Spinoza came, the so-called Marranos, who before arriving in Holland had lived for generations in Spain and Portugal as forced converts from Judaism, absorbing Christian symbols, mental patterns and ways of thinking. Former Jews who tried to remain Jewish in secret had only scant knowledge of Judaism, and what they knew they conceptualized in Christian terms; while others, having mixed the two religions, ended up neither Jews nor Christians, and looked to the affairs of this life and this world as a substitute to religious salvation in either Jesus or Moses. However, describing the events of Marranos responding to the miracle in the Convent of São Domingos in Lisbon on April 19, 1506 with statements such as "How can a piece of wood do miracles?", or "Put some water to it and it'll go out", Yovel states that these words "expressed the same rough Jewish common sense resisting the Catholic sense of mysterium and insisting on calling super-rational phenomena by their earthly names." The Marrano experience, Yovel suggests, made it possible for several ex-Marranos to adopt the immanent and "secular" standpoint which Spinoza radicalized and gave it a powerful systematization.

Volume One (The Marrano of Reason) uses historical and literary materials to elicit a set of typical and recurring Marrano patterns (for example: life on two levels, overt and concealed; the use of equivocation and dual language; the search for an alternative way to salvation, replacing Jesus and Moses with philosophical reason, etc.) which in Spinoza are transposed from the context of religion to that of reason. From the other direction, key philosophical issues in Spinoza (language, politics and the multitude, the third kind of knowledge) are also, at the same time, shown to be responding to Marrano-like elements that further illuminate and contextualize them. Yovel insists that this contextualization is not reductive: Spinoza's ideas have an independent rational import that cannot be reduced to the historical circumstances that allowed them to arise.

A heretic to all religions, Spinoza was banned by the rabbis but refused to convert to Christianity. By calling him "the first modern Jew", Yovel highlights his relevance to the Modern Jewish situation. His case - even more than his thought - anticipated most of the rival and contradicting solutions that were offered in later centuries to non-orthodox Jewish existence. Yet Spinoza himself neither advocated nor personally realized any of those options. He thus became, involuntarily, a founding father of almost all the forms of modern life in which he himself did not participate.

Volume Two (The Adventures of Immanence) uncovers the presence of Spinoza's revolution in some major turns of modern thought. Yovel distinguishes between naturalism and the broader concept of a "philosophy of immanence". The latter maintains that (a) immanent reality is all there is, the overall horizon of being; (b) it is also (through humans) the only valid source of moral and political norms; and (c) interiorizing this recognition is a precondition to whatever liberation or redemption humans can hope for. Yovel takes the reader into the latent and overt conversation with Spinoza in the work of Kant, Hegel, the left-Hegelians (Heine, Feuerbach, Hess), Marx, Nietzsche and Freud - all of whom shared a core philosophy of immanence but worked it out in rival ways, which also diverge from Spinoza's. This approach makes vividly present Spinoza's influence on modernity, including Jewish modernity. In the Epilogue, speaking for himself, Yovel argues for a critical philosophy of immanence to modify Spinoza's "dogmatic" one.

The book was widely discussed and translated into French, German, Hebrew, Spanish, Portuguese, and Japanese.

=== Dark Riddle: Hegel, Nietzsche and the Jews ===
This book treats the so-called "Jewish question"' as primarily a question for Europe with itself. Hegel was a philosopher of reason and Nietzsche its outright opponent; Hegel was a (heterodox) Christian and Nietzsche a self-proclaimed 'Antichrist'; Hegel sought to bring rational modernity to its climax and Nietzsche wanted to replace it with a "Dionysian"culture based upon the "will to power". Yet each in terms of his project had to grapple with the issue of Judaism and the Jews. The result was ambivalence of two different kinds.

The young Hegel manifested a harsh anti-Jewish attitude which his mature philosophy mitigated. Reversing his early claim that the Jews had contributed nothing worthwhile to humanity, the older Hegel went as far as to attribute to Judaism one of the most consequential turning points in human history: the recognition that absolute being is Spirit, not a thing or a natural entity, and that Spirit is higher than nature. Yet Judaism falsified its own revolution in the very act of performing it, because it shaped itself as "a religion of sublimity", by which Hegel means a religion of self-alienation and slavish submission to an infinitely remote Master, before whom the individual stands in dread as a complete nullity. In this dialectical fashion, the mature Hegel tacitly condemned the Jews in the very act of praising them. Furthermore, unlike Nietzsche, Hegel denied post-Christian Jews any historical significance and value. It followed from Hegel's logic of history that the Jews had lost their raison d'être already in antiquity and become the empty shell of their former self. Yet while he was puzzled and disturbed by their long survival as a theoretical paradox (a "dark riddle"), this did not prevent Hegel from supporting political emancipation and social acceptance for the contemporary Jews, an unpopular position in Germany at the time. Hegel looked down on German xenophobic nationalism, and as a philosopher of freedom he chose, without enthusiasm, to admit the Jews into the modern world as a necessary recognition of their humanity.

Nietzsche not only overcame the anti-Jewish prejudice of his early years but, unlike Hegel, did so with passion. Following his break with Wagner and Schopenhauer the mature Nietzsche came into his own as an ardent anti-anti-Semite. To him, the modern anti-Semite was a creature of ressentiment, and as such was the genealogical cousin of the ancient Jewish priest, whom Nietzsche despised with the same ardor, and for the same psycho-philosophical reasons. Nietzsche refused to attribute to Judaism a single unchanging essence. His attitude, as reconstructed in this book, varies according to three phases in Jewish history. (1)The Old Testament Hebrews were the object of Nietzsche's admiration on account of their grand figures, great deeds, and authentic self-affirmation. (2) Nietzsche loathed and reviled the ‘priestly' Judaism of the Second Temple (and Testament), primarily because it had engendered Christianity and the "slave morality" that corrupted Europe alongside Socratic rationalism. (3) He admired the Jews of the Diaspora because of their historical depth and the existential power they accumulated in centuries of resistance and perseverance. This power Nietzsche now wanted to pour into the new Europe he envisioned. He therefore expects urged the Jews to become secularized, to mix with other Europeans, to excel in all European affairs and eventually set new standards and values to them. The Jew's existential vigor and anti-Christian disposition would then pour into Europe, promoting a Dionysian revolution of values. Unlike Hegel, then, Nietzsche treats the Jews as an ethnic, historical human group and not primarily a religion.

This book, published in Hebrew in 1996 and translated into English, French, Japanese, and Romanian, also shows that universal reason does not necessarily exclude a strong anti-Jewish bias, and a philosophy of power must not necessarily be anti-Semitic.

=== The Other Within: Split Identity and Emerging Modernity ===
Following his interest in Spinoza, Yovel was intrigued by the broader phenomenon of the Marranos and studied it for its own sake. The result was another opus: The Other Within: The Marranos: Split Identity and Emerging Modernity (Princeton 2009). Yovel describes the Marranos as "the other within"—people who both did and did not belong. Rejected by most Jews as renegades and by most veteran Christians as Jews with impure blood, Marranos had no definite, integral identity, Yovel argues. The "Judaizers"-Marranos who wished to remain secretly Jewish - were not actually Jews, and those Marranos who wished to assimilate were not truly integrated as Hispano-Catholics. Rather, mixing Jewish and Christian symbols and life patterns, Marranos were typically distinguished by a split identity. They also discovered the subjective mind, engaged in social and religious dissent, and demonstrated early signs of secularity and this-worldliness. In these ways, Yovel says, the Marranos anticipated many central features of Western modernity, and also of the modern Jewish experience.

Historians who see their work as constructive of the national identity tend to appropriate the Marranos (or, Conversos) exclusively to their own nation and culture. Yovel's book argues it is impossible to attribute any integral and univocal identity to the Marranos, neither Jewish nor Hispano-Catholic, since it was, precisely, the disintegration of the compact characteristic of medieval society which is the most distinctive and interesting feature of these people, and one of the main contributions they made to early-modern Europe.

One of this book's philosophical conclusions is that the split identity which the Inquisition persecuted and modern nationalism condemns as illicit, is a genuine and inevitable shape of human existence, which deserves recognition as a basic human freedom.
