= Yoram Yovell =

Psychiatrist, brain researcher, and psychoanalyst (born 1958)

Professor Yoram Yovell
- יורם יובל
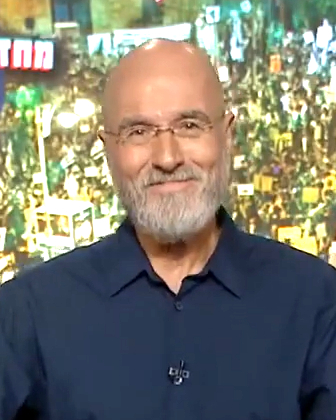
- Yoram Yovell giving a speech at the Great Virtual Protest, 26 September 2020
- Born: August 2, 1958 (age 67); Jerusalem, Israel
- Other name: Yoram Leibowitz
- Education: Medicine; Neurobiology; Psychiatry
- Alma mater: Columbia University; Weizman Institute; Hebrew University of Jerusalem
- Occupations: psychoanalyst; psychiatrist; brain researcher
- Years active: 1982–present
- Known for: psychoanalysis; psychiatry; brain research
- Relatives: Yeshayahu Leibowitz (paternal grandfather)
- Website: yovell.co.il

Yoram Yovell (Hebrew: יורם יובל; born: August 2, 1958) is an Israeli psychoanalyst, psychiatrist and brain researcher. He is an associate professor of the Practice at the Department of Medical Neurobiology, The Hebrew University of Jerusalem. His areas of research include the neurobiology of emotions and mechanisms of physical and mental pain.

Yovell is an expert in the field of the neurobiology of love and emotions. In addition to his academic work, Yovell hosts the talk show Sichat Nefesh (Heart to Heart) on the Israeli Educational Channel and has authored many popular books in Hebrew which consist of detailed accounts of psychotherapy sessions.

== Background ==
Yoram Yovell was born Yoram Leibowitz, the son of Yafa (née Hefetz) and Uri Leibowitz, a professor of neurology. His grandfather was the scientist and philosopher Yeshayahu Leibowitz. He grew up in a Jewish Orthodox family in the Old Katamon neighborhood in Jerusalem and attended high school near the Hebrew University. When Yovell was fourteen years old, his father died from cancer and he spent many days at his grandfather's house. Yovell served as an officer in the Artillery Corps. of the Israel Defense Forces and took part in the first Lebanon War as a commander of an outlook post in southern Lebanon. During his military service, he changed his family name to Yovell due to the persisting attachment to his grandfather's last name, Leibowitz.

Yovell studied medicine at the Hebrew University of Jerusalem, neurobiology at the Weizman Institute, and psychiatry at Columbia University. He is a faculty member at the Etingon Psychoanalytical Institute in Jerusalem and has worked for several years in Manhattan.

Yovell served as head of the trauma field of study at the School for Social Work at the faculty for the study of welfare and health. He was head of the Institute for Brain and Emotion Research at the University of Haifa. Currently, he lectures on psychopathology at the Hebrew University's Medical School.

Since 2008, Yovell has hosted a talk show on the Israeli Educational Channel entitled Sihat Nefesh ("Heart to Heart") which consists of personal talks with well-known Israeli personalities who expose details and personal experiences some of which have been previously published in the media and others which have not been published throughout their careers.

In 2009, Yovell took part and hosted Eich Lehiyot Meusharim B'Shisha Sheurim (How to Become Happy in Six Lessons) on Israeli Channel 2 which was originally produced in 2005 and was delayed broadcast for fear of poor rating. The series received unexpected success with an average rating score of 20%.

In 2019, Yovell began his involvement for change in the political arena in Israel. He established the demonstration tent at Jerusalem's Independence Park during the twenty-one days which were left for the dissolvement of the 22nd Knesset.

In January 2021, Yovell joined the "New Economy Party" headed by Yaron Zelekha in light of the general elections which were held a few weeks later. On March 14, he backed away from his decision and retired from the party.

In 2019, Yovell hosted a three-part series entitled “Sodot Ha’moach" (Secrets of the brain) on Israel's HOT 8 Channel.

In 2021, Yovell hosted a three-part series entitled "Lev Shavur" (Broken Heart) on Israel's HOT 8 Channel.

In 2023, Yovell hosted a three-part series entitled “Guf and Nefesh" (Body and Soul) on Israel's HOT 8 Channel.

On October 7, 2023, during the October 7 Hamas attack on Israel, Hamas militants abducted approximately 260 civilians from southern Israeli communities and took them to the Gaza Strip. In October 2024, amid growing frustration over stalled negotiations and the perception that the Government of Israel was not taking all possible steps to secure the hostages’ release, Yovell co-founded Mishmeret 101 with mothers and family members of the abductees. The non-partisan movement advocates for intensified efforts to bring all the hostages home and for national unity. Its activities include silent vigils in white clothing held outside government buildings in Jerusalem.

== Personal life ==
Yovell has two sons from his first marriage and three daughters from his current spouse.

== Books ==
- Israel: Sichat Nefesh (Israel: Heart to Heart), Kinneret Publishing (2012)
- Sa'arat Nefesh (Internal Storm), Keshet Publishing (2001)
- Ma Zot Ahava (What Is Love?), Keshet Publishing (2001)
- Helena Al HaGag (Helena on the Roof), Miskal Publishing (1998)
