= April 1976 Gush Emunim march through the West Bank =

In April 1976, the far-right Israeli ultranationalist movement Gush Emunim held a two-day march through the occupied Palestinian West Bank. 20,000 Gush Emunim supporters participated in the march, proclaiming their right to settle in the Occupied Palestinian Territories. The march triggered counter-protests by Palestinians, during which one Palestinian was killed by the Israeli military.

== Background ==
After Israel's victory in the Six-Day War in 1967, Israel occupied the Palestinian territories, including the West Bank. Nine years after, in March 1976, the Israeli government announced that it would seize 20,000 dunams of land in Northern Israel that belonged to Arab citizens of Israel, as part of its policy of judaization. In response to the seizure, a mass wave of protests broke out across Israel and Palestine, with Arab citizens of Israel holding a general strike and Palestinians in the occupied territories holding solidarity protests. The Israeli government deployed the Israel Defense Forces in response to the protests, resulting in six Arab Israelis being shot dead.

In mid-April, the Israeli Military Governorate allowed Palestinians in the West Bank to hold the 1976 West Bank local elections. The elections resulted in a significant victory for candidates affiliated with the Palestine Liberation Organization, resulting in the emergence of a younger, more nationalist, and more radical local Palestinian leadership. The results shocked the Israeli government, which had not anticipated such a victory, and the government quickly began warning the newly elected candidates not to use their positions to speak on the Israeli–Palestinian conflict.

April 1976 also saw significant debates within the Israeli government over how to handle the ongoing issue of the Kedumim settlement in the West Bank. The settlement, illegally established by Gush Emunim members in late 1975, had declared that it was ready to violently resist the Israeli military if the military attempted to remove them, leading to the government granting them temporary permission to stay in place. According to The New York Times, the settlement had become "the prime political issue in Israel. It is being described as a political time bomb that could easily explode and bring down the Government of Prime Minister Yitzhak Rabin," while being an issue that had "raised questions about the overall Israeli policy in the occupied territories."

== Events ==
=== Gush Emunim march ===
On 11 April, the Israeli cabinet held a meeting to discuss the planned march, with some of the Mapam ministers moving for it to be banned. The cabinet, however, largely voted against banning the march, with only two Mapam ministers (Minister of Health Victor Shem-Tov and Minister of Aliyah Shlomo Rosen) voting in favour of a ban, and with the Independent Liberal ministers abstaining. During the meeting, Minister of Defence Shimon Peres claimed that Gush Emunim leaders had given personal assurances that the march wouldn't attempt to establish a settlement once they reached their end destination of Jericho, despite Gush Emunim having previously petitioned the government for permission to set-up a settlement in Jericho.

The march began at dawn on Sunday 18 April, timed to coincide with Passover, with over 20, 000 participants heading out from the settlement of Beit El. The marchers proclaimed that Jews had an "inalienable right" to settle in the West Bank, with Gush Emunim leader Moshe Levinger declaring that "the whole of Eretz Israel belongs to the Jewish people and I think we should continue to build settlements here." As they marched, they waved Israeli flags and chanted nationalist songs, some of the marchers displayed photos of imprisoned Soviet Jews, and some carried guns. Zevulun Hammer, a National Religious Party MK and Minister of Welfare in Rabin's government, participated in the march.

The marchers then established a camp for the night in the Samarian Hills. Some of the marchers dropped out and returned home during the night, due to rain. The next day, the march continued towards Jericho. The Israeli military deployed soldiers to guard the route of the march as it proceeded, and imposed a curfew in central Jericho to prevent residents from demonstrating against the march. Residents in the outer districts of Jericho did not demonstrate against the march, and the march eventually disappated peacefully.

=== Palestinian protests ===
The first day of the Gush Emunim march coincided with the funerals of two Palestinians who had been killed in the preceding days in incidents related to the 1976 West Bank local elections. One of the Palestinians, 42-year-old Khalil Issa, had been murdered by an anti-PLO candidate who failed to win a seat in the elections. A demonstration was subsequently held in Ramallah over Issa's death, to which the Israeli government decided to deploy troops. The deployment sparked considerable unrest, with the demonstrators throwing stones at the soldiers and a melee developing between several soldiers and demonstrators. During the melee, one soldier's rifle accidentally fired, killing 6-year-old Jamil Hamis. The unrest ended when pro-PLO mayor Karim Khalaf convinced the Israeli commander to withdraw the troops.

Palestinians who attended the funerals of Issa and Hamis displayed placards opposing the Gush Emunim march during the funeral, and attempted to hold a demonstration against the march in main square of Ramallah after the funeral, but were blocked by Israeli soldiers, who fired warning shots before they could reach the square. Israeli soldiers also moved to disperse Palestinian demonstrations on 18 April against the march in Nablus, using tear gas, and in Jenin.

Further Palestinian demonstrations were held against the march on 19 April, including one in Tulkarm, and including school strikes by local secondary school pupils. Another demonstration was held in Jenin, outside the city hall, before being forcibly dispersed by Israeli soldiers, with one of the protestors being shot in the shoulder. The Israeli military claimed that the protestors had thrown stones and refused to disperse voluntarily, subsequently imposing a curfew on parts of Jenin. A demonstration in Nablus was also forcibly dispersed by Israeli soldiers. As they dispersed the demonstration, a group of soldiers attempted to pursue some of the protestors into an alley, but found themselves cornered in the alley by the protestors, who began throwing stones at them. The soldiers opened fire to be able to retreat, injuring two stones throwers and killing one, 55-year-old Sayid Taher Jaba.

Palestinian protests against the march continued the day after the march ended, on 20 April. Three demonstrators were injured in Nablus that day when Israeli soldiers attempted to disperse a demonstration that threw stones at the soldiers. 19 demonstrators in Tulkarm were arrested by the Israeli military and were convicted by an Israeli military tribunal the same day of violating a curfew order, being sentenced to eight months incarceration and 6000 shekel fines. Some shopkeepers attempted to hold commercial strikes, but the military broke the locks to their stores to force them to open. Three Israeli police officers were injured by stones in East Jerusalem, after dispersing a schoolgirls' march.

In the first few days of May 1976, the Israeli government banned a Palestinian march from Ramallah to Jerusalem that was planned as a reply to the Gush Emunim march. To prevent the march from being held, the Israeli military cordoned off Ramallah, blocking residents of other cities from entering the city to begin the march and blocking journalists from entering to cover the march. The military also moved to forcibly disperse gatherings within Ramallah near the planned starting point of the march.

== Reactions ==
On 20 April, Israeli Prime Minister Yitzhak Rabin undertook a visit to settlements in the Jordan Valley, declaring during the visit that settlements were "here to stay for a long time." Minister of Justice Haim Yosef Zadok, of Rabin's Labour Alignment party, condemned the march.

Two demonstrations on the topic of the march were held on 19 April by Jewish Americans in New York. One of the demonstrations, held at the Dag Hammarskjöld Plaza, was held in support of the Gush Emunim march, and featured speeches by Rabbinical Council of America president Fabian Schonfeld, Hebrew Institute of Riverdale head Avi Weiss, and Princeton University professor Benjamin Frankel. The other demonstration opposed the Gush Emunim march, being held by the Socialist Zionist Union in Ralph Bunche Park. Breira also released a statement opposing the march, co-signed by Joachim Prinz of the World Conference of Jewish Organizations, David Tulin of the Philadelphia Zionist Federation, Max Ticktin of B'nai B'rith, and Balfour Brickner of the Union of American Hebrew Congregations.

== Aftermath ==
In the week following the march, an Israeli conferenced titled "Settlers for Settlements" and calling for an increase in settlements was held at Ein Vered, with speakers including Ariel Sharon, Meir Zorea, and Dan Laner. The issue of the Kedumim settlement would continue to be debated, with the Israeli cabinet issuing a policy statement in early May 1976 to relocate the settlement to a new location within the West Bank of the government's choosing.

Two further waves of unrest would break out in the West Bank in May 1976, beginning with International Workers' Day protests and then protests against Israeli Independence Day, during which several Palestinian protestors would be killed by Israeli forces.
