= May 1976 Palestinian unrest =

1976 unrest

Demonstration in Nablus, in the occupied West Bank, following the death of an Arab girl killed by the Israeli forces, May 1976

The May 1976 Palestinian unrest was a wave of unrest that broke out across the Occupied Palestinian Territories in May 1976. The wave began with demonstrations on 1 May to mark International Workers' Day, during which one Palestinian protestor was killed. The wave was followed by demonstrations against the Israeli occupation during the Israeli Independence Day celebrations, and a bombing by Palestinian militants in Jerusalem on 3 May to try and disrupt the celebrations that injured around thirty people, mostly with light injuries. The wave of unrest continued through mid-May, when three Palestinian protestors demonstrating against still-in-effect curfews were killed by Israeli forces in three days between 16 and 18 May.

== Background ==
Israel captured the West Bank from Jordan and the Gaza Strip from Egypt during the Six-Day War in 1967 and placed both under military administration.

The first half of 1976 had proven to be a turbulent year in Israel and Palestine. In March, the Israeli government move to seize land belonging to Arab citizens of Israel to promote Judaization of the Galilee sparked widespread protests among both Arab Israelis and Palestinians in the Occupied Territories, during which six Arab Israelis were shot dead by Israeli soldiers. In mid-April, Palestinians in the Occupied Territories were allowed to hold local elections, resulting in a significant victory for PLO-affiliated candidates, a result that came as a shock to the Israeli government. The government quickly began warning the newly elected candidates not to use their positions to speak on the Israeli–Palestinian conflict. Later in April, a wave of protests broke out among Palestinians in response to a march through the West Bank held by the far-right Israeli ultranationalist group Gush Emunim through the West Bank, demanding that they be allowed to build illegal settlements in Palestinian land. In the course of the protests, one Palestinian was shot dead by Israeli forces.

Tensions between Israelis and Palestinians during this period were also festering due to ongoing debates over the illegal Israeli settlement of Kedumim. The settlement had been established by Gush Emunim in late 1975, and had been granted temporary permission by the Israeli government to stay in place after the settlers threatened to violently resist any attempt by the government to relocate them. According to The New York Times, the settlement had become "the prime political issue in Israel. It is being described as a political time bomb that could easily explode and bring down the Government of Prime Minister Yitzhak Rabin," while being an issue that had "raised questions about the overall Israeli policy in the occupied territories." The PLO-led Palestinian insurgency in South Lebanon also represented a significant point of tension, especially as it played a significant role in sparking the Lebanese Civil War in 1975.

== Events ==
=== International Workers' Day ===
The month of May 1976 began violently in the Israeli–Palestinian conflict. To mark International Workers' Day, a number of demonstrations were held across the Occupied Palestinian Territories, which the Israeli moved to disperse, mostly succeeding without casualties. In Nablus, however, one Palestinian youth was shot and killed by Israeli soldiers as they dispersed the demonstration, after he threw stones at the soldiers. The Israeli military subsequently imposed a curfew on Nablus, as well as on the city of Tulkarm.

The death and curfews sparked discontent among Palestinians in the days that followed, with several demonstrations and school strikes being held. On 4 May, Mayor of Nablus Bassam Shakaa formally asked the military to lift the curfew on his city. The military refused.

=== Israeli Independence Day ===
In the evening of 3 May, Palestinian militants set off a motorcycle bomb near Ben Yehuda Street in Jerusalem, injuring around thirty people, including the Greek Consul in Jerusalem, with one being seriously injured and the rest sustaining light injuries. The bombing was intended to disrupt the Israeli Independence Day celebrations, which landed on 4 July in 1976. Later that night, a group of Jewish Israelis set fire to several buses in a predominantly Arab quarter of Jerusalem as an act of retaliation.

Following the bombing, and in preparation for Independence Day, the Israeli military deployed additional troops and imposed strict restrictions on movement through the Occupied Territories, including closing town the Allenby Bridge and Damiyah Bridges into Jordan, and setting up roadblocks to search vehicles along main roads. The curfews on Nablus and Tulkarm were extended. On Independence Day, Palestinians in some cities attempted to hold demonstrations protesting against the ongoing occupation, which the Israeli military moved to disperse, injuring two Palestinians as they did so. Later that day, Rabin gave a speech in which he pledged to "maintain law and public order" in the Occupied Territories.

On 6 May, Israeli Minister of Defence Shimon Peres held a meeting with Shakaa and the Nablus city council. Following the meeting, Peres agreed to partially lift the curfew on the city and to gradually re-open the secondary schools that had been shut to prevent student protests. Four Palestinians were shot and injured by Israeli forces that day, one when the military dispersed a demonstration against the occupation, two for running away from soldiers who attempted to stop them from breaking the curfew, and one who ran away from soldiers who had ordered him to halt.

=== Shootings ===
The unrest among Palestinians mostly quieted for the next ten days, but would spark again on 15 May, when a 16-year-old Palestinian boy was shot in the leg by Israeli soldiers in Jenin for violating the curfew that was still in effect. The shooting led to a wave of protests the next day, including commercial strikes in Nablus and East Jerusalem, as well as school strikes across the West Bank. The Israeli military moved to calm the situation, dispersing demonstrations and ordering shopkeepers to end their participation in the strikes, or else the military would break the locks to their shops and force them open.

In Nablus, however, the dispersion of the protests again resulted in the death of a Palestinian, 16-year-old Lena Hassan Nabulsi, the daughter of a prominent local merchant. Nabulsi was shot and killed by Israeli soldiers in the staircase of an apartment building. The military initially claimed that she had been accidentally killed when soldiers fired warning shots to disperse a group of stone-throwing youth, subsequently announcing that it would open an investigation into the killing. Palestinians in Nablus, on the other hand, accused the military of having chased her into her apartment block after dispersing the protest and having shot her at point-blank range. One Palestinian resident of the apartment block where Nabulsi was killed claimed to journalists that the soldier who shot Nabulsi "threatened to shoot me too if I did not shut up."

The killing sparked further demonstrations later that day, with two more Palestinian youth being shot and injured that day when the military dispersed a demonstration outside Nabulsi's home. On 17 May, the Nablus city council, as well as the local chamber of commerce and several local women's organisations, declared a general strike in protest over Nabulsi's death, and called for the United Nations to deploy peacekeepers to the West Bank.

As demonstrations flared across the West Bank on 17 April, another Palestinian youth, teenager Abdullah Mustapha Hawass from Shuafat, was shot dead by Israeli soldiers. The military claimed that Hawass had been part of a group of youth that blockaded a road and started stoning a military vehicle that was blocked by the barricades. The military subsequently re-imposed the curfews that had been partially lifted.

A third Palestinian was shot and killed by Israeli soldiers on 18 April, a 21-year-old man in East Jerusalem. The Israeli military claimed that the man had been a part of a group of Palestinians that cornered a group of soldiers in an alleyway in the Old City of Jerusalem and were throwing stones and bottles at the soldiers.

=== Further unrest ===
The unrest would continue over the next few days, including a battle between students on the Hebrew University of Jerusalem campus on 19 May. Arab Israeli students at the university held a demonstration to protest against the military's use of force in the Occupied Territories, to which a group of Jewish Israeli students held a counter-demonstration, with both demonstrations eventually attacking each other. On 20 May, the Israeli military carried out the mass arrest of sixty Palestinians in East Jerusalem, accusing them of inciting riots.

By the end of the weekend of 22–23 May, the unrest had mosty subsided.

== Reactions ==
Mayor of Tulkarm Hilmi Hanoun stated that there would be "no end to these demonstrations as long as the Israelis build Jewish settlements on our lands."

Minister of Police Shlomo Hillel rejected calls for the Israeli military to stop deploying troops to Palestinian protests, saying that "if we adopt such a policy we shall lose control of the situation." Permanent Representative of Israel to the United Nations Chaim Herzog accused the international media of unbalanced coverage of the unrest, claiming that it received more coverage than the ongoing Troubles in Northern Ireland and the Lebanese Civil War, saying that "when Israel endeavors to maintain law and order and one casualty is regretfully caused, it becomes a major international story, while when a nation is being destroyed, the subject is relegated to a comparatively minor place in the media because it is no longer news." Likud leader and Leader of the Opposition in the Knesset Menachem Begin stated that the West Bank was "our land by right," accusing the PLO of having incited the unrest, and saying that Israel and its allies must "prevent the establishment of a Soviet base in an ‘Arafatan state’ in the heart of the Middle East."

American newspaper The New York Times stated in an editorial that "there is no objective way—nor much practical utility—in assigning specific blame for the bloody incidents on the West Bank," saying that both trigger-happy Israeli troops and disorderly Palestianian youth could be blamed for the unrest, but that "the only fact that is certain is that Arabs and Israelis are flirting with disaster in their reliance on forceful confrontation to make their political points."

During the May unrest, controversy was sparked among the media after the Israeli government accused international news networks of paying Palestinians to stage demonstrations. Permanent Representative of Israel to the United Nations Chaim Herzog claimed that Palestinian youth were paid $300 to erect barricades and burn tyres in the roads. The accusations came after the military arrested NBC News correspondent Avrom Zaritsky, detained him and his camera crew for six hours, accusing them of filming in a closed military zone. The allegations were strongly denied by media organisations in Israel and Palestine. Yitzhak Shargil of the Jewish Telegraphic Agency wrote that the accusations "could not be proven," but that it was clear that "the palls of black smoke, the flaming gasoline cannisters, provide the kind of pictorial material on which TV thrives."

== Aftermath ==
In mid-August 1976, the Israeli military announced that it would court martial the soldier who shot Lena Nabulsi on charges of negligence.
