= Nachala (organisation) =

Israeli settler organization

Nachala (Hebrew: נחלה) is a radical Israeli settler organization that aids younger settlers and builds new illegal Israeli outposts in the West Bank. Their ambition is for Israel to annex both the Gaza Strip and the West Bank. It was established in 2005 by Gush Emunim leaders, Rabbi Moshe Levinger and Daniella Weiss.

== Funding ==
In September 2015 the organization created the "National Fund for the Building of Eretz Israel", with the launch event attended by many ministers, members of the Knesset, and other right-wing public figures including Israel Katz (Likud), Miki Zohar (Likud), Uri Ariel (The Jewish Home), Rabbi Eli Ben Dahan (The Jewish Home) and settler leader Daniella Weiss. The fund was reportedly to collect and then disburse funds to Jewish settlers in order to purchase Palestinian land in the West Bank and Jordan Valley.

A member of Nachala reported that they have sent representatives to Florida to help raise money for the organization, and receive funding from several groups in the United States including Americans for a Safe Israel. They have raised funds for settlements using the Chabad crowdfunding platform, with a reported 5 million shekels (US$1.4 million) raised in three days for unauthorized outposts in the West Bank in 2022.

== Actions ==
During the first Trump administration's discussions of a peace plan between Israel and the Palestine Authority in 2019, the organization set up a protest camp in front of the Prime Ministers home in Jerusalem. The protest called to repel any plan that included a withdrawal and instead highlighted the former Likud Prime Minister Yitzhak Shamir's plan to establish new settlements in the West Bank and settle some two million Jews there. Shortly after, they published a document signed by dozens of right-wing cabinet ministers and members of the Knesset, where they pledged to work towards the realization of the Shamir plan and the cancelation of the two-state plan.

In July 2022, the group announced that they would be creating three illegal outposts in the West Bank via a video post by then director Tzvi Elimelech Sharbaf. He stated: "We are making a clear demand. Say ‘no’ to Arabs taking control of open spaces [in Area C of the West Bank], and say ‘yes’ to Jews taking control of all these open spaces." Members of the group were evacuated from areas in the West Bank after they had been declared as illegal, after hundreds of settlers including families with small children set up tents in numerous areas around the West Bank. While a settler leader indicated that the plan was to continue moving sites, they had been warned by Public Security Minister Omer Barlev, the police and IDF that their actions were illegal and would lead to arrest.

Shortly after the 7 October attacks, the organization tweeted on X (formerly known as Twitter) placing the blame of the attacks and violence on the lack of settlement in Gaza, with an invite to the proposed January 2024 conference. In January 2024, the organization hosted a conference where they petitioned for the creation of Israeli settlements in Gaza after the Gaza war ends. Daniella Weiss, the director of the organization, told reporters that the October 7 attacks had changed history and that "It's the end of the presence of Arabs in Gaza. It's the end....Instead of them, there will be many, many Jews that will return to the settlements, that will build new settlements."

In late February 2024, the organization promoted illegal settlers who had attempted to settle in northern Gaza after breaking through the Erez border crossing between northern Gaza and Israel. The organization called the attempted erection of buildings the New Nisanit settlement, and posted multiple pictures of the building and activists.

=== Gaza Strip settlement advocacy (2023–present) ===
In 2023–2025, the Nachala organization and its leadership, including Daniella Weiss, were reported by NBC News and other outlets as promoting the idea of renewed Israeli settlement in the Gaza Strip following the October 7, 2023 attacks. According to these reports, Weiss stated that Palestinians would no longer reside in Gaza under such plans and that the establishment of settlements could be implemented within a relatively short timeframe.

Israeli Finance Minister Bezalel Smotrich has also been reported as expressing support for the concept of a Gaza Strip that is “completely Jewish and ours,” contributing to public debate within Israel regarding the territory’s future.

Media reports indicate that Nachala-related activities and statements have drawn criticism internationally, and that the United Kingdom and Canada imposed sanctions on Weiss and the organization in 2025.

== Reception ==
=== Backing ===
The organization has received significant backing from right-wing and religious public figures for its 2022 plan to create three illegal outposts simultaneously, including MKs, former ministers like Bezalel Smotrich, the Ashkenazi Chief Rabbi of Jerusalem Aryeh Stern, and settlement mayors. In 2022, Israeli interior minister Ayelet Shaked called them "wonderful youth" and "a real inspiration".

=== Controversies ===
The initiative has drawn controversy among the settler community. As of July 2022, a group member was under investigation for killing a Palestinian man during a Nachala "scouting operation". The left-wing Peace Now organization has been confronting Nachala's settlement moves, including by physically opposing their attempts to create new illegal outposts.

==== Sanctions ====
Nachala was sanctioned by the United Kingdom in May 2025 alongside cofounder Daniella Weiss. The UK government stated that Nachala was responsible for "facilitating, inciting, promoting and providing logistical and financial support for the establishment of illegal outposts and forced displacement of Palestinians in Israel and the Occupied Palestinian Territories".

== See also ==
- Proposed Israeli annexation of the West Bank
- Gush Emunim - prior Israeli ultranationalist settlement movement
- Hilltop Youth
