= Dan Be'eri =

French-born Israeli rabbi

Dan Be'eri (born 1944 or 1945) is a French-born Israeli rabbi, founder of the Jewish educational method known as the Barkai method and a former member of Gush Emunim and the Jewish Underground.

== Biography ==
Born to a French Protestant family, his father having converted to Protestantism from Catholicism. He immigrated to Israel after the Six Day War after previously living in the country for a short period of time as a kibbutz volunteer before returning to France for his university studies.

In 1969, he converted to Judaism and married his Jewish girlfriend, Shoshanna Tannenhaus. The couple had nine children. Be'eri completed his studies at a yeshiva in 1973.

=== Right-wing activities ===
He joined Gush Emunim in 1976, and by the late 1970s had joined a plan to blow up the Dome of the Rock. In the 1980s, he was a member of the Jewish Underground. In 1985, he received a prison sentence for taking part in the plot to attack the Dome of the Rock, which was never carried out. According to Be'eri, the plan aimed to provoke Egypt into abandoning its peace treaty with Israel, and delay the return of the Sinai Peninsula (then under Israeli control) to Egypt. He also testified that he left the plan after the Jewish settlement of Yamit, in Sinai, was abandoned in April 1982. While in prison awaiting his sentencing, Be'eri undertook a hunger strike in November 1984. He reached a plea bargain deal in March 1985. His three year sentence was commuted by Israeli President Chaim Herzog in December 1985.

He has promoted the celebrating of Hannukah through the lens of modern Zionism, drawing parallels between the Macabees and the Jewish Underground.

=== Education ===
In 1978, he founded a Talmud Torah, a religious children's school, in Kiriyat Arba, a Jewish settlement near Hebron in the West Bank. At this school, Be'eri integrated general and Jewish subjects (with the exception of mathematics).

Be'eri has criticized the traditional model of yeshiva learning, believing it to no longer be necessary in the modern state of Israel.

He is a member of the advisory board of AlHatorah.org.

== See also ==
- Rabbi Nathan Lopes Cardozo
- Rabbi Yitzhak Graanboom
- Gerim
