= Proposed Israeli resettlement of the Gaza Strip =

Map of proposed new settlements in the Gaza Strip, presented at the "Settlement Brings Security" conference in January 2024

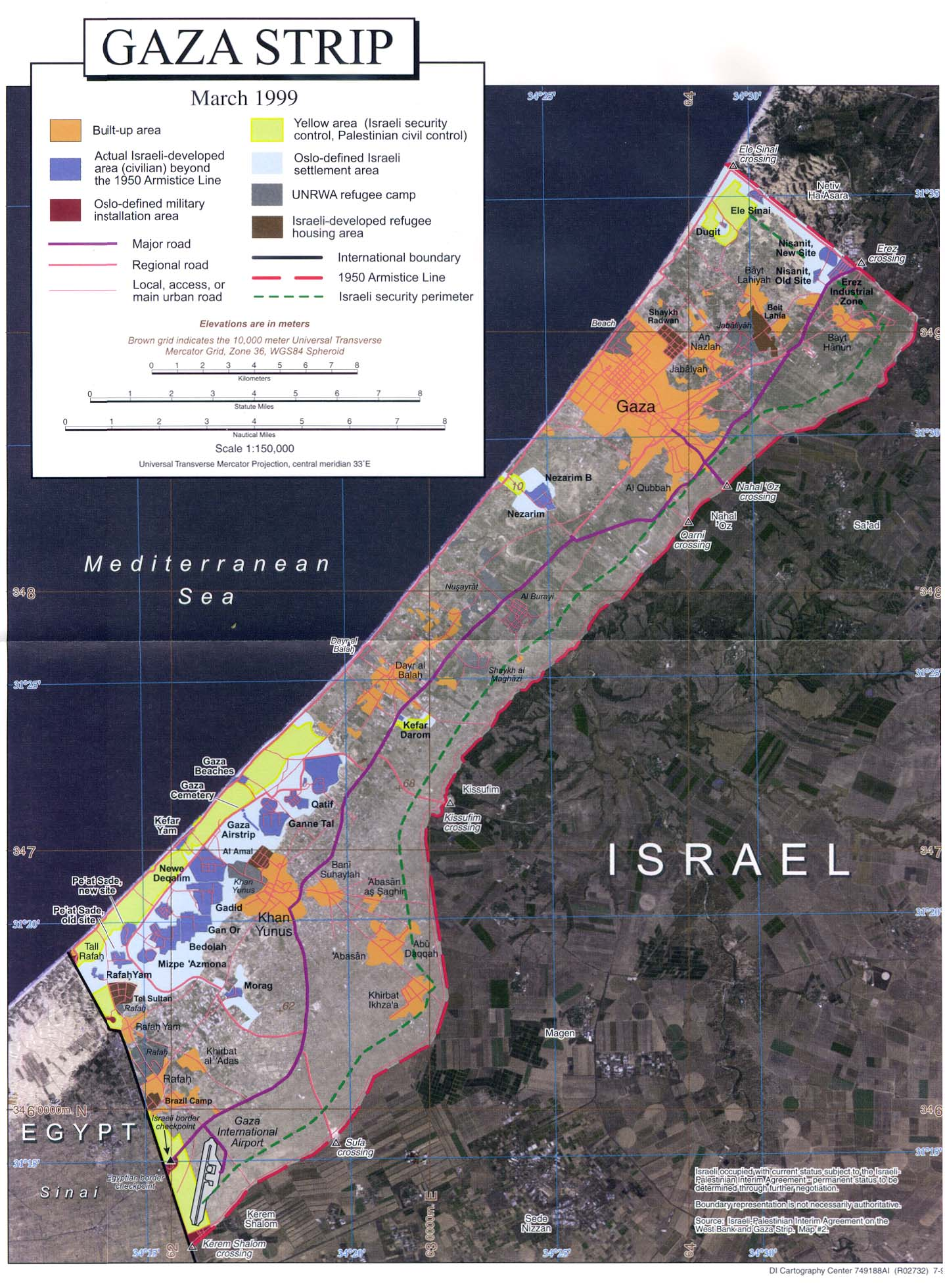
Settlement area in the Gaza Strip (March 1999)

In the context of the Gaza war, some Israelis have proposed expulsion of Palestinians from Gaza Strip or the creation of conditions leading to their exodus, and a new wave of Israeli resettlement of the Gaza Strip. Previously, Israel had dismantled its settlements in Gaza in its unilateral withdrawal from the area in 2005, after 38 years of settlers living in the Gaza Strip.

Prime Minister Benjamin Netanyahu has said that "Israel has no intention of permanently occupying Gaza or displacing its civilian population" and that "Israel is fighting Hamas terrorists, not the Palestinian population, and we are doing so in full compliance with international law".

== Background ==
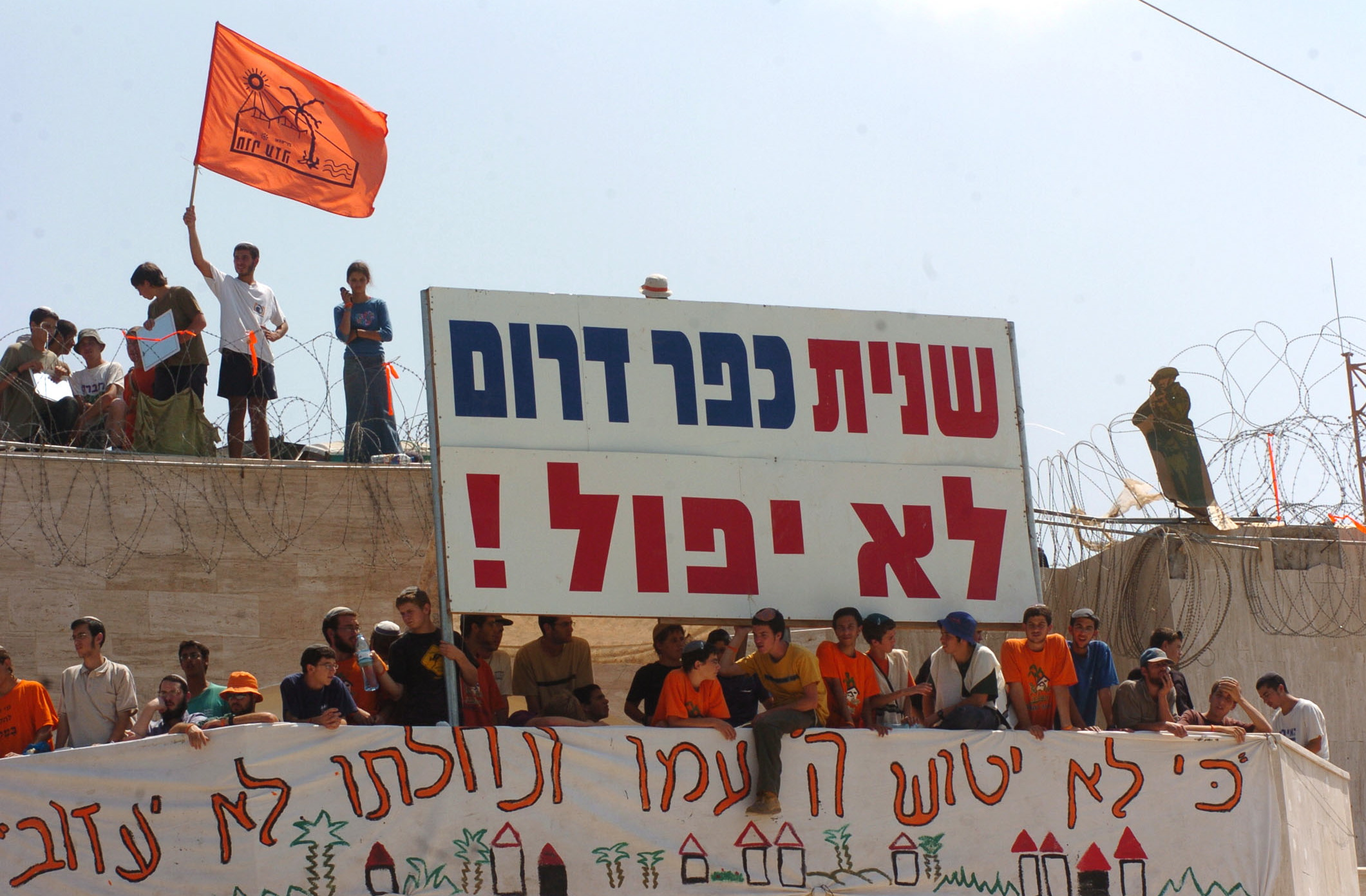
Residents protest against the evacuation of the Israeli community Kfar Darom. Sign translation: "Kfar Darom will not fall twice!". August 2005.

Israeli settlements are civilian communities built by Israel throughout the Israeli-occupied territories, populated almost exclusively by Jewish identity or ethnicity on lands that have been occupied by Israel since the Six-Day War in 1967. The expansion of settlements often involves the confiscation of Palestinian land and resources, leading to displacement of Palestinian communities and tension and conflict. Settlements are often protected by the Israeli Defense Forces (IDF) and are frequently flashpoints for violence against Palestinians. Human Rights Watch and other observer organization volunteer regularly file reports on Israeli settler violence, referring to stoning and shooting incidents involving Israeli settlers against Palestinians.

The disengagement of Israeli settlements in the Gaza Strip was first proposed by Prime Minister Ariel Sharon in 2003, and approved by the Knesset in February 2005. It was implemented in August 2005, with compensation packages offered to those that would voluntarily leave their homes; others were forcibly evicted by IDF forces. The year of the disengagement would see the removal of 8,475 settlers from Gaza, while in that same year the number of settlers in the West Bank increased by 15,000.

The international community considers the establishment of Israeli settlements in the Israeli-occupied territories illegal on one of two bases: that they are in violation of Article 49 of the Fourth Geneva Convention, or that they are in breach of international declarations. (Note: "the establishment of the Israeli settlements in the Occupied Palestinian Territory has been considered illegal by the international community and by the majority of legal scholars." (Pertile 2005, p. 141)) (Note: "The real controversy hovering over all the litigation on the security barrier concerns the fate of the Israeli settlements in the occupied territories. Since 1967, Israel has allowed and even encouraged its citizens to live in the new settlements established in the territories, motivated by religious and national sentiments attached to the history of the Jewish nation in the land of Israel. This policy has also been justified in terms of security interests, taking into consideration the dangerous geographic circumstances of Israel before 1967 (where Israeli areas on the Mediterranean coast were potentially threatened by Jordanian control of the West Bank ridge). The international community, for its part, has viewed this policy as patently illegal, based on the provisions of the Fourth Geneva Convention that prohibit moving populations to or from territories under occupation." (Barak-Erez 2006, p. 548)) (Note: "It can thus clearly be concluded that the transfer of Israeli settlers into the occupied territories violates not only the laws of belligerent occupation but the Palestinian right of self-determination under international law. The question remains, however, whether this is of any practical value. In other words, given the view of the international community that the Israeli settlements are illegal under the law if belligerent occupation." (Drew 1997, pp. 151–152)) (Note: "The international community considers Israeli settlements within the occupied territories illegal and in breach of, inter alia, United Nations Security Council resolution 465 of 1 March 1980 calling on Israel 'to dismantle the existing settlements and in particular to cease, on an urgent basis, the establishment, construction and planning of settlements in the Arab territories occupied since 1967, including Jerusalem'." (ILC 2005, p. 14)) (Note: "The international community has taken a critical view of both deportations and settlements as being contrary to international law. General Assembly resolutions have condemned the deportations since 1969, and have done so by overwhelming majorities in recent years. Likewise, they have consistently deplored the establishment of settlements, and have done so by overwhelming majorities throughout the period (since the end of 1976) of the rapid expansion in their numbers. The Security Council has also been critical of deportations and settlements; and other bodies have viewed them as an obstacle to peace, and illegal under international law." (Roberts 1990, pp. 85–86)) The United Nations, international human rights organizations and many legal scholars regard the Gaza Strip to still be under military occupation by Israel, while Israeli disputes this.

Protests, gathering and movements against the disengagement and removal of settlers began shortly after the announcement of disengagement and have continued throughout the years. In October 2004, 100,000 Israelis marched in cities throughout Israel to protest the plan under the slogan "100 cities support Gush Katif and Samaria". In 2014, activists started a Facebook group Returning to Gush Katif (i.e. the Jewish-Israeli Gaza settlements) a group now renamed Home - Returning to the Gaza Strip (Hebrew: הביתה - חוזרים לחבל עזה, romanized: Habayta - Khozrim le’evel ’Aza). By December 2023 it had more than 10,000 followers.

== Proposed military settlements ==
In late January 2024, an unnamed Israeli military officer reported that Netanyahu and others in the government had requested that military members begin to establish "permanents bases" in the Gaza Strip. Reportedly, the orders were given verbally and individually to a select few. Some military officials anonymously spoke out against the proposed settlements, claiming that they would be sitting ducks and would require a security partnership with authorities such as the Palestinian Authority. Israel Foreign Minister Israel Katz also floated in January 2024 that in event of a two state solution between Israel and Palestine an artificial island could be created off the coast of the Gaza Strip that Israel would control.

== Conferences ==
By November 2023, a campaign known as "Returning Home" had already kickstarted. On 22 November, a conference took place in Ashdod where various grassroots organizations convened. The event featured addresses not only from far-right politicians such as Otzma Yehudit MK Limor Son Har-Melech but also from two from Netanyahu's conservative Likud party, Ariel Kallner and Tally Gotliv. Son Har-Melech stated that there was "no escape from returning and fully controlling the Gaza Strip" and that full control was "extensive and flourishing settlement" unlike the Gush Katif settlements that were concentrated. While Gotliv called for a wall and tower in the northern part of Gaza immediately. Another speaker, Yossi Dagan, had led an influential lobby in the Likud Central Committee. Dagan was a prominent settler activist who had to withdraw from a settlement in a small area of the West Bank that was de-settled in 2005 around the same time as Gaza.

In November 2023, 11 leading right-wing organizations launched the "Coalition of Organizations for the Return to the Gaza Strip and All the Settlements of Northern Samaria" in a series of secret meetings. The new coalition plans to call on Israelis to join settlement nuclei (gar’inim) that will rebuild the former Jewish communities of Gush Katif, starting with the northern Gaza Strip and northern Samaria.

In December 2023, hundreds of settlement activists gathered in central Israel for another conference titled "Practical Preparation for Returning to Gaza."

=== "Settlement Brings Security" Conference, January 2024 ===
On 28 January 2024, a conference known as "Settlement Brings Security" (Hebrew: התיישבות מביאה ביטחון, romanized: Hitiashvút Mevi’á Bitakhón) was held in Jerusalem, sponsored by the right-wing Nachala Israeli settler organization. Amidst the war in the Gaza Strip, twelve Israeli cabinet ministers, including several from Prime Minister's Likud party, took part in the conference. The director of Nachala, Daniella Weiss, referenced the October 7 attacks and the ongoing war for the need of the conference and resettlement, stating to reporters: "It's the end of the presence of Arabs in Gaza. It's the end....Instead of them, there will be many, many Jews that will return to the settlements, that will build new settlements." In response to Israel's far-right national security minister Itamar Ben-Gvir stating that the Palestinians living in Gaza should "go away from here", some attendees shouted "Only eviction!"

The conference advocated for building new Israeli settlements in Gaza and encouraging the displacement of Palestinians living there. About 5,000 mostly religious Israelis attended including a large presence of children and teenagers.

==== Cabinet ministers' participation and its implications ====
11 of the 37 sitting cabinet ministers attended the conference, in addition to 15 ruling-coalition MKs. The presence of so many members of the government marked the elevation of the resettlement movement from the fringe of politics to new prominence, as former advisor to prime ministers Alon Pinkas wrote:

"Even if you've seen one before, it's not the same. This was not a fringe opposition group: it was the government of Israel in all its political splendor, unabashedly showing its true colors. This was the governing coalition in an orgy of anti-state and antidemocratic euphoria."

— Alon Pinkas, former advisor to prime ministers Ehud Barak and Shimon Peres in "An Orgy of Jewish Supremacy and Antidemocratic Euphoria, Encouraged by Netanyahu", published in Ha'aretz, 29 January 2024

The 11 cabinet ministers who attended the conference are listed in the table:

Name	Position	Party	Capacity
Itamar Ben-Gvir	Minister of National Security	Otzma Yehudit	keynote speaker
Bezalel Smotrich	Minister of Finance	Religious Zionist Party	keynote speaker
Yitzhak Goldknopf	Minister of Construction; Leader of the Haredi political party Agudat Yisrael; Leader of the political alliance United Torah Judaism	United Torah Judaism	speaker
Shlomo Karhi	Minister of Communications	Likud	attendee
Haim Katz	Minister of Tourism	Likud	attendee
Idit Silman	Minister of Environmental Protection	Likud	attendee
May Golan	Minister of Social Equality and Promotion of the Status of Women	Likud	attendee
Amichai Chikli	Minister of Diaspora Affairs and Social Equality	Likud	attendee
Yitzhak Wasserlauf	Minister of Development of the Periphery, Negev and Galilee	Otzma Yehudit	attendee
Amihai Eliyahu	Minister of Heritage	Otzma Yehudit	attendee
Orit Strook	Minister of Settlements and National Mission	Religious Zionist Party	attendee

Map of proposed settlements presented at Jan. 2024 Nachala conference.

==== Map of proposed settlements ====
Translated copy of the map presented at January 2024 Gaza resettlement conference showing Gaza City after ethnic cleansing with proposed new Hebrew neighborhood names. Translation is approximate.

The conference room was decorated with a giant map showing prospective settlements in the place of existing Palestinian towns and cities as well as 15 re-established ones that existed before Israeli disengagement from Gaza in 2005. 6 were new, including large Jewish-Israeli-only settlements which were to be built on the current sites of the two largest cities in the Strip: Gaza City (2017 population 590,481) and Khan Younis (2017 pop. 205,125), in addition to Rafah (pre-war pop est.: 280,000, but which at the time of the conference had over a million refugees and residents living there).

The new settlements named were:

- Core of Gaza City (Hebrew: גרעין של העיר עזה, romanized: gar’in shel ha’ir ’Aza)
- Yishai (Hebrew: ישי, romanized: Yishai) would be built on the outskirts of the ruins of Beit Hanoun in northern Gaza
- Gates of Gaza District (Hebrew: שערי חבל עזה, romanized: Sha'arey Hevel ’Aza) settlement in Khan Yunis
- Hessed La'alafim (Hebrew: חסד לאלפים, romanized: Hessed La'alafim) south of Rafah, to be reserved for Haredi settlement
- Maoz on the southern Gaza coast

The map showed Stars of David in the centers of these 3 major cities and labeled the pushpins pointing to the stars as "cores", but the map itself did not specify whether the light green area surrounding the Jewish-Israeli "cores" would be populated by Palestinians or not, although cabinet ministers frequently promoted the need to coerce Palestinians to leave their country.

==== Map of a Hebrew Gaza City ====
Organizers also presented a map of a new Gaza City, also published in the Wall Street Journal, with new Hebrew names for the neighborhoods and the significance of the new names. The following table summarizes the material shown on that map:

As mentioned on the map
"New" Hebrew name			Color	"Former" Arabic name			Meaning of "new" Hebrew name
Romanized	Hebrew	Literal meaning	Color	Romanized	Arabic	Literal meaning	Meaning of "new" Hebrew name
Agripion	אגריפיון	(Place name)	Light yellow	Al-Shati	الشاطئ	“the beachside camp”	"Herod the Great gave the place this name when he founded it."
Netzakh Israel	נצח ישראל	"Israel Eternity"	Violet	Al-Awda	العودة	“Return” (as in “Right of Return”)	The translation of the name is the neighborhood of the returnees and therefore it is appropriate to call the neighborhood Netzah Israel in the city of Ot
Gavish	גָבִישׁ	"Crystal"	Burnt yellow	Al-Nasser	النصر	"Named after the ruler of Egypt Jamel Abd al-Nasser in the 1950s"	"… General of the Southern Command in the Six Day War, Yeshayahu Gavish"
Najara	נַאגָּ֗ארָה	(Last name of rabbi)	Orange	Ash-Sheikh Radwan	الشيخ رضوان	"It is not known who Sheikh Radwan is and there are different traditions for Muslims and Christians."	"… Name of the famous rabbi of Gaza, Rabbi Israel Najara"
King David	דוד המלך (pron. Mélekh Davíd)		Dark Yellow	Ar-Rimal	الرمال	"The Sands"	"Location of ancient synagogue of Ot, where the famous mosaic of King David is found"
Dereg	דֶרֶג	"Echelon"	Grey	Ad-Daraj	الدرج	"Named after the many steps in the neighborhood"	"There was a well-known Jewish community there in the 19th century"
Hagdud Ha'ivri	הגדוד העברי	"Hebrew Regiment"	Purple	At-Tuffah	التفاح	"’The Apple‘, named after the apple trees that grew there in the neighborhood"	"There is an English Cemetery where the soldiers of the Hebrew Regiment killed during the occupation of Gaza are buried."
Shadi 'Aza	שעדי	"Heroes of Gaza"	Darky murky grey	Shejaiya	الشجاعية	"’Courage‘, meaning ’neighborhood of the brave‘, from Muslims who fought the Crusaders near Gaza."	"Attributed to the IDF fighters who fought in the city."
Tzabar	צבר	Prickly pear; also Jew born in Israel	Yellow-green	Al-Sabra	الصبرة	prickly pear	"Translation of Arabic name"
Old City	העיר העתיקה (pron. Ha'ir ha'atiká)		Yellow	Old City (Al-Madīna Al-Qadīma)	البلدة القديمة		
Agala	עגלה	carriage, cart	Purple	Ash-Sheikh Ijlin	الشيخ عجلين	Not fully legible: "The historian Eusebius (…) IV will return that the (…) Arab is probably blind"	
Tel El-Hawa	תל אל-הווא	Wind Hill	Red	Tel al-Hawa	تل الهوا	"Hill of the Wind"	"Translation of Arabic name"
Shivat Tzion	שִׁיבָת צִיּוֹן	“Return to Zion”	Light grey	Az-Zeitoun	الزيتون	"Named after the local olive trees."	"Most of the Jewish community lived …(here)… until the riots of 1859, …(thus)… Shivat Zion."
Shaarei ‘Aza	שערי עזה	“Gates of Gaza”	Green	At-Turukman	التركمان	"The Turkmens. Named after the Turkmen warriors who fought the crusaders at Gaza."	"According to tradition Samson died here at the Gates of Gaza."

==== Criticism ====
===== Coercing "voluntary emigration" or ethnic cleansing =====
In an interview outside the conference and in another the next day on i24NEWS, director of Nachala and leader of Israeli West Bank settlers Daniella Weiss called for the further holdback of food deliveries and other humanitarian from the Gaza Strip so that the Palestinians there would leave or "want" to leave.

Security minister Smotrich said, "we need to find a legal way to voluntary emigrate" Palestinians, before Shlomo Karhi clarified:

“We have an obligation to act… to [bring about] voluntary emigration — even if this war… turns this voluntary migration into a situation of ‘Coerce him until he says, "I want to do so"’”
— Shlomo Karhi, Israeli Minister of Communications, 28 January 2024

The conference atmosphere was festive, carnival-like, and at times a rally, featured chanting of the phrase "Am Yisrael Chai", but also singing. Ben-Gvir and others were photographed dancing. The festivity during a war and around a topic involving the need to coerce Palestinians to a mass exodus from their country, which some characterize as a de facto call for ethnic cleansing, drew wide criticism.

===== Hostages' families =====
Family members of hostages held by Hamas in Gaza strongly criticized the conference both for its festive atmosphere, for the movement's forming a perceived impediment to the hostages' release, and for its calls for coerced emigration (i.e. ethnic cleansing) of Palestinians from their country, which one hostage mother compared to expulsions of Jews in Nazi-controlled Europe.

Gil Dickmann, whose cousin Carmel Gat was held hostage by Hamas, voiced his rancor at the Knesset, stating, "In the morning, you throw mud at each other, and in the evening, you dance at an event that only harms us. In Gaza, the hostages do not dance." One family member stated of the conferencegoers "you're dancing on their blood".

At an Aliyah and Immigrant Absorption Committee meeting on Monday, Meirav Leshem-Gonen, mother of hostage Romi Gonen, said:

"All this talk of transfer made me shudder. The transfer you talk about refers to ethnic and religious connections to a certain group. Isn't that what was done to us in Europe? We say we want to be better than this, but we are ready to do the same thing to another nation."

— Meirav Leshem-Gonen, mother of hostage Romi Gonen at the Knesset, 30 January 2024

===== Ultranationalism empowered and mainstreamed =====
Alon Pinkas, former advisor to prime ministers Ehud Barak and Shimon Peres, wrote that the Resettlement Brings Security Conference marked a milestone:

What you saw Sunday wasn't "Startup Nation" Israel. It wasn't "13 Nobel Prizes" Israel... It was not liberal-democratic Israel. What you saw was messianic ecstasy and religious fervor in a position of power... what you saw was not just the far-right elements... This is him. Unadulterated, unhinged Netanyahu, trying to distance himself far from the debacle of the October 7 massacre. This strain of religious-nationalistic Jewish supremacy has been normalized, legitimized, mainstreamed and encouraged by Netanyahu... What you saw was not merely a theocratic-fascist strain in Israeli society and politics but almost half of Mr. Netanyahu's coalition (27 lawmakers)...

— Alon Pinkas, in his essay An Orgy of Jewish Supremacy and Antidemocratic Euphoria, Encouraged by Netanyahu, published in Ha'aretz, 29 January 2024

Pinkas further suggested that the extremism of the conference's theme and the implication that ultranationalist Orthodox idea is now empowered by the ruling coalition "maybe, just maybe" might force Israel to "decide" and its liberal-democratic majority to assert itself politically and change the direction of the government's actions concerning the war tactics, settlement policy, and approach to Israeli–Palestinian relations overall.

===== From other governments =====
The United States, Israel's closest ally, has said that Gaza must continue to be run by Palestinians after the war and that there must be serious moves towards establishing a Palestinian state.

Canada's Global Affairs department issued a statement saying that "Canada rejects any proposal that calls for the forced displacement of Palestinians from Gaza and the establishment of additional settlements. Such inflammatory rhetoric undermines prospects for lasting peace."

In Ramallah, Palestine, the Ministry of Foreign Affairs and Expatriates of the State of Palestine condemned the conference and the 11 cabinet ministers' participation, saying it "openly and publicly endorsed genocide, war crimes and the forcible transfer of the Palestinian people."

=== "Preparing to Settle Gaza", October 2024 ===
On 20 and 21 October 2024, an event titled "Preparing to Settle Gaza" organised by the Nachala movement and other right-wing groups took place near the border of the Gaza Strip. Described as a festival, it included a sukkot tent city, a tour of "lookout points" into the Gaza Strip, and logistical preparations for settling in Gaza. Prior to the festival Likud minister May Golan, nine Likud Knesset members and six branch chairmen circulated an invitation to an event being organised on the festival's second day. A Haaretz editorial commented that effectively it was "signed by the Likud party" The Likud event was intended to include a tour of Kibbutz Nirim. A few days before it was scheduled to take place however the kibbutz released a statement that they had not been consulted, that they had no interest in the tour and that it would not happen; the tour was cancelled.

The settlers watched as bombs fell on the northern Gaza Strip. Many of those participating had decorated their sukkahs with signs declaring they were getting ready for their permanent home in Gaza or claiming ownership of the land. Others such as Ben Zion Gopstein sold stickers calling for Jewish revenge and director of Nachala Daniella Weiss stated that "The Gaza Arabs lost their right to be here." Limor Son Har-Melech, an Otzma Yehudit MK, stated, "Gaza is the property of our ancestors since time immemorial, we will not rest until we settle it again". One attendee responded to a question regarding what should happen to Palestinians in Gaza, stating, "We should kill them, every last one of them. And if the government won't do that then we should just kick them out. This is our land. And we deserve it."

== Settler actions ==
On 29 February 2024 dozens of far right activists broke through the Israeli military checkpoint at the Erez crossing between Northern Gaza and Israel, and entered Gaza. Some of those that crossed the checkpoint set up for several hours makeshift buildings of wood and plastic inside Israeli territory beyond the walls of the Erez Crossing, without interference from Israeli police or IDF troops. The activists called the buildings a "settlement" and named it the New Nisanit, after the former Nisanit settlement of Gaza that was evacuated in 2005. They were reportedly part of a group that had gathered at Sderot before forming a convoy to the Erez crossing to push for the rebuilding of Israeli settlements in Gaza, before breaking into Gazan territory. Some of those stopped by Israeli police and IDF troops were detained with nine arrested for violating a military order and stopping a police officer from their duty. The settler organization Nachala celebrated the actions of those involved, and posted pictures of the buildings and activists, including them attaching a mezuzah to the building in a short religious ceremony, to social media.

A member of the Israeli far-right "Return" movement told Anadolu Agency that 500 families had volunteered to reoccupy Gaza, claiming that Israel will only be safe after the establishment of "Jewish settlements and towns" in Gaza. When cautioned about the warnings from the international community about illegal Israeli settlements in Gaza, the member reportedly responded; "We are a sovereign state. This (Gaza) is our land....I don't understand. This is similar to demanding that Germany give part of its territory to another structure. Why would the US give part of Texas to Mexico?" Two eighteen-year-olds invoked religious descriptions when speaking about their entering and then removal from Gaza and participation in the attempted settling. One stated about feeling no fear in Gaza; "There was no fear of being inside [Gaza], the Holy One is with us and the IDF is here helping us...We came here [because] we wanted to go home. I live in a community of deportees from Gush Katif, and we wanted to go back." While the other alleged that "We have come to represent the entire public, the Jewish people. We want to return to the whole Land of Israel, to all parts of our Holy Land. There are no ‘two states for two peoples’ — that's not right. The people of Israel belong to the Land of Israel."

It was reported in March 2024 that through WhatsApp groups and messages, informational sessions for the reestablishment of Israeli settlements in Gaza were held in private Israeli homes with Daniella Weiss promoting the settlement vision. Much of the information is similar to the resettlement conference that was held in January 2024. Weiss indicated to CNN reporters that about 500 families have already signed up to resettle through the Nachala organization, which is one of more than a dozen resettlement organizations. In October 2024, senior Israeli officials stated that the Israeli government was ultimately seeking the annexation of large parts of the Gaza Strip.

== Trump resettlement proposal ==
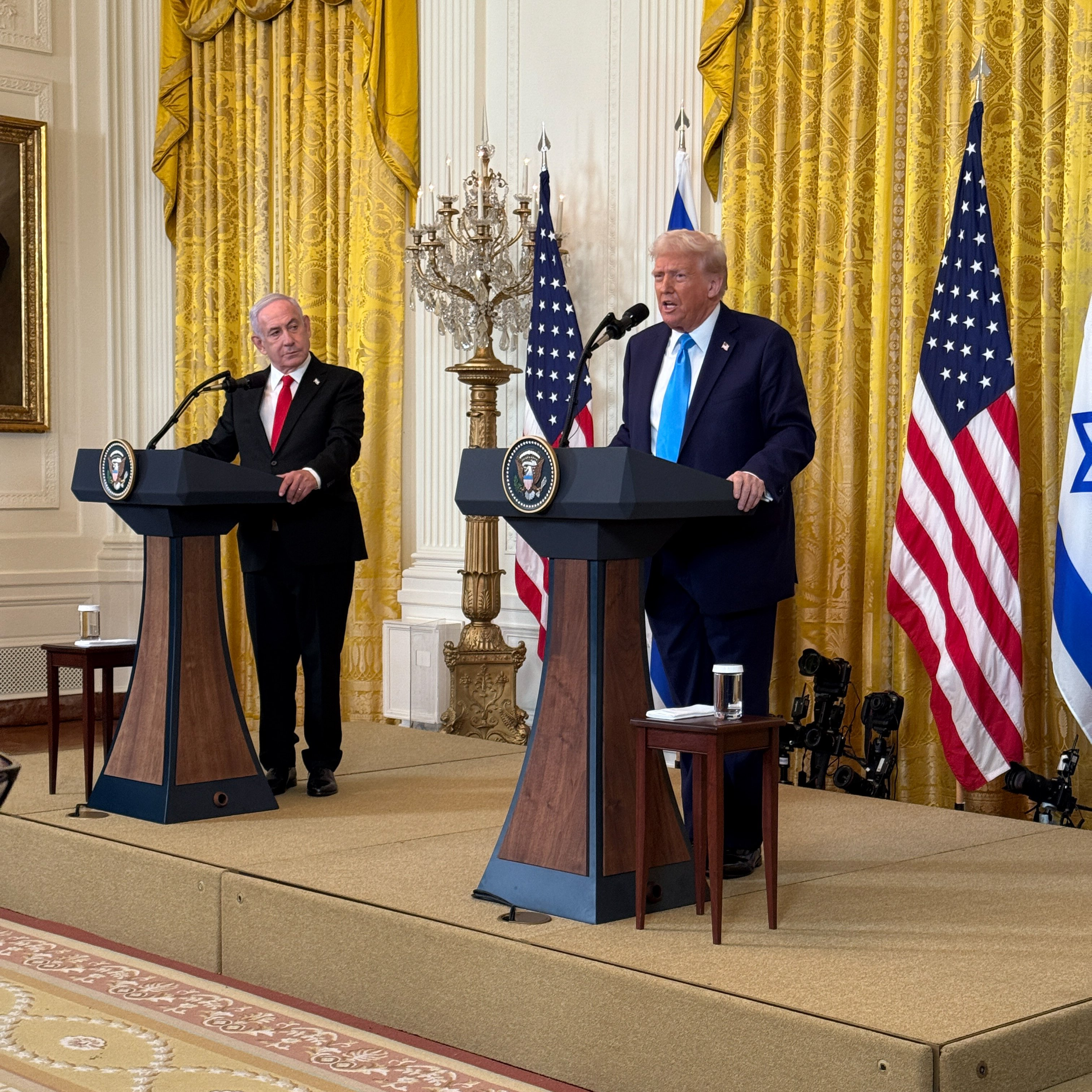
Trump and Israeli Prime Minister Benjamin Netanyahu at the White House - February 2025

In December 2023, Donald Trump's former National Security Advisor John Bolton proposed resettling Palestinians from Gaza.

In January 2025 during his second presidency, United States President Donald Trump reportedly asked King Abdullah of Jordan and Egypt's president Abdel Fattah el-Sisi to take in Palestinians from Gaza. Trump continued calling Gaza a demolition site and said that "we just clean out that whole thing" and the removal of Gazans would either be temporary or long term. While Palestinians and other countries condemned Trump for his comments, the former Israeli national security minister Itamar Ben-Gvir commended Trump and Israeli finance minister Bezelal Smotrich stated that the emigration would allow for Jewish settlements to be reestablished.

In early February 2025, Trump caused outrage while speaking with Netanyahu after he made comments that the United States could "take over" and "own" Gaza and Gaza would be inhabited by "the world's people". While Netanyahu expressed that the idea was something that they could look into, many US allies and Arab nations roundly rejected the idea. Trump's proposal to resettle Palestinians from Gaza was supported by Netanyahu, Israeli Defense Minister Israel Katz, Israeli opposition leader Yair Lapid, and the majority of the Israeli public.

On 21 February 2025, after opposition from Arab states, Trump said he would "recommend" — but was "not forcing" — his plan for the US takeover of Gaza and the resettlement of the Palestinian population.

Near the end of February 2025, Trump posted an AI generated video to his social media platform Truth Social and Instagram which showed a reimagined Gaza that was renamed as Trump Gaza. The video included children running out of rubble into a world of luxury buildings, a towering golden statue of Trump, Trump enjoying a belly dancer, multiple shots of a man resembling Elon Musk, and depictions of Trump and Netanyahu sunbathing on beach in Gaza. The video drew backlash and condemnation by Palestinian, Truth Social and Instagram users, and others and was later reportedly tracked to a network of pro-Israeli social media accounts that was first posted in early February.

On 12 March 2025, Trump said that "nobody is expelling any Palestinians" from Gaza, which signaled a change from his previous stance. According to "three sources familiar with the effort", Israel and the United States were interested in resettling Gazans to either Syria, Sudan, Morocco, or the separatist Somali regions of Puntland and Somaliland. Somalia and Sudan rejected the proposal, while Puntland and Somaliland expressed willingness to enter discussions on the matter in exchange for diplomatic recognition. In May 2025, reports emerged that the Trump administration was working on a plan to permanently relocate 1 million Gazans to Libya.

== Criticism ==
=== Ethnic cleansing ===
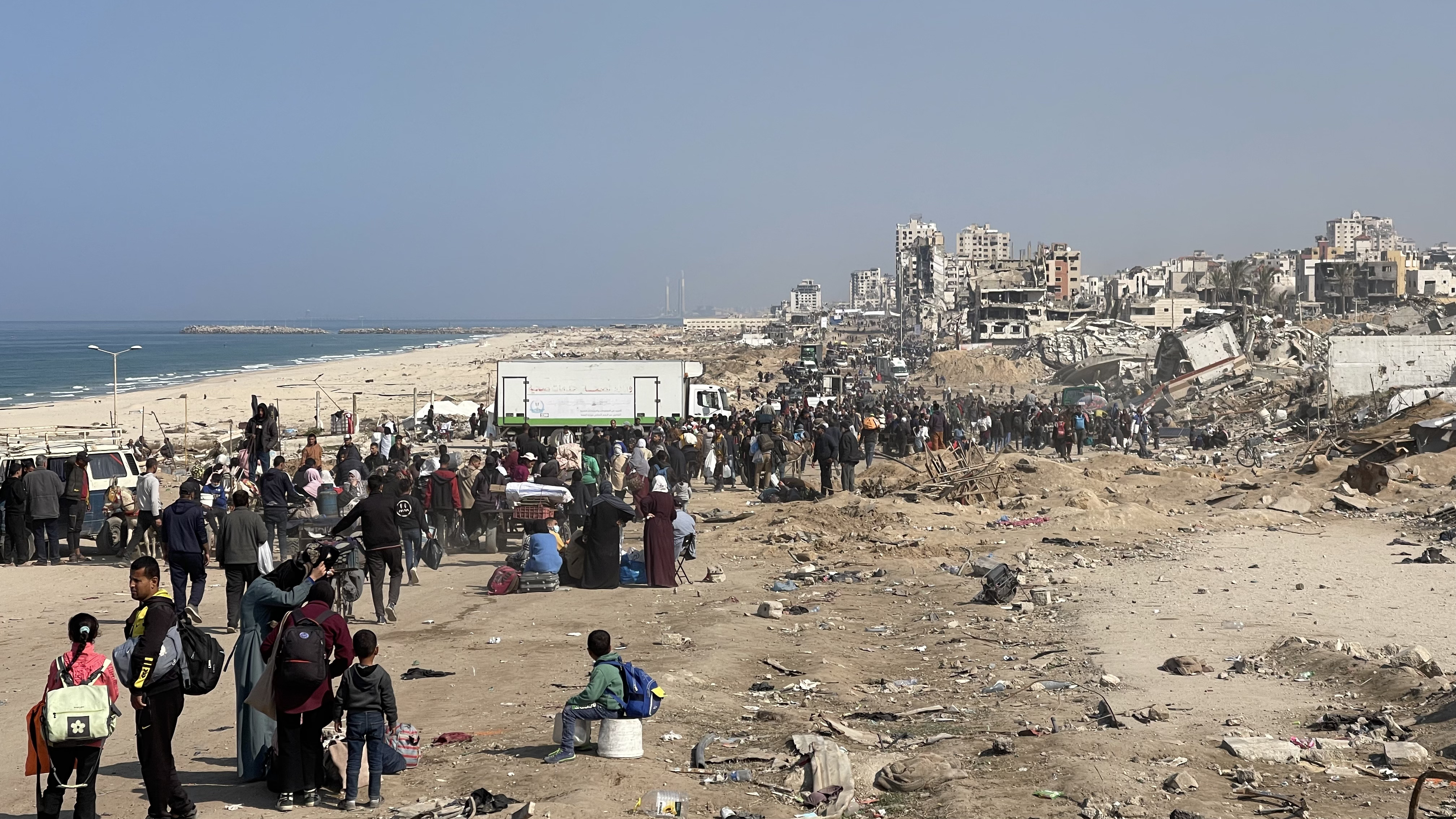
Palestinian internal refugees in the ruins of Gaza in January 2025

Israeli newspaper Ha'aretz wrote that ideas in the resettlement movement effectively equivalent to forced displacement, ethnic cleansing – such as Ben-Gvir urging Israel to create conditions such that Palestinians in Gaza would want to leave their country, and Shlomo Karhi stating that "'voluntary' [emigration] is at times a situation you impose until they give their consent".

While the conference slogan was "settlement," what it was really about was transfer – this was stated explicitly and repeatedly on stage, in countless forms.

— "The People of Israel Will Settle Gaza': Netanyahu's Ministers at Far-right Conference Endorse Expulsion of Palestinians", Ha-Aretz, 29 January 2023

In another article, Ha'aretz characterized the sometimes thinly veiled calls for forced displacement of Palestinians from their country "ethnic cleansing in God's name":

The conference's message was clear – not just rebuilding the settlements, but ethnic cleansing in God's name.

— "Ethnic Cleansing in God's Name: The Only Israelis With a Plan for the 'Day After' in Gaza", Ha-Aretz, 29 January 2023

Alleged "expulsions from homes and mass displacement" of Gaza Palestinians were cited in point 43(3) of the ICJ genocide case as supporting evidence that Israel is committing acts of genocide. The application also mentions in item 101 Israeli security cabinet member and Agriculture Minister Avi Dichter (Likud) stating on 11 November 2023, "we are now rolling out the Gaza Nakba".

More generally, "crimes involving persecution… including those resulting in or intended to achieve the deportation or forcible transfer, directly or indirectly, of the Palestinian population, the re-populating of "cleansed" territories with Israeli settlers and the unlawful appropriation of Palestinian land and properties" may constitute crimes under the Rome Statute.

=== Conflict with other countries ===
Additional downsides of the resettlement of Gaza may include:

- Conflict with Saudi Arabia and other Sunni Arab countries
- Deeper conflict with the international community

=== Security and military resources ===
New settlements would require significant security resources, potentially diverting Israeli military forces from other tasks.

== Spectrum of Israeli views ==
In addition to the specific support expressed by people and groups at the January 2024 conference, Israeli public opinion is divided on the issue of resettling Gaza.

=== Israeli government ===
==== Prime Minister Netanyahu ====
Netanyahu has repeatedly said that it is not the government's policy or plan to resettle Gaza with Israeli Jews, however he is largely dependent on resettlement supporters for political support and according to The Atlantic, "Netanyahu might try to do it anyway".

==== Officials ====
In November 2023 members of the Israeli Parliament, comprised mostly from the Likud party proposed repealing a law that prohibits Israeli citizens from entering Gaza, but has not moved forwards with the proposal. As 2023 came to an end, far-right Minister of National Security Itamar Ben-Gvir stated "We must promote a solution to encourage the emigration of the residents of Gaza". After Moshe Saada, a far-right Member of the Knesset (MK), claimed he had never before heard such calls saying it was obvious that all the Gazans need to be destroyed, the Washington Post claimed that "Israeli calls for ethnic cleansing are only getting louder."

In January 2024, far-right Finance Minister Bezalel Smotrich stated that Israel will rule Gaza, and that in order to rule Gaza for the long term there must be an Israeli civilian presence. Zvi Sukkot, a member of the Knesset from the Religious Zionist Party political party, stated that "we first need to occupy, to annex, to destroy all the houses there, build neighborhoods there" during a committee hearing.

=== Israeli public support ===
In a mid-November 2023 poll, a majority of Israelis support renewed Israeli settlement in the Gaza Strip. However, a December 2023 Hebrew University poll found the opposite, that Israelis oppose resettling Gaza 56 to 33 percent. In January 2024, a Haaretz polling expert and journalist, speaking to reporters stated that the public opinion on re-establishment of settlements in Gaza varies widely. She indicated that the general range is from about 25% to about 40% in support of establishing Jewish Israeli settlements in Gaza. A February 2024 poll by the Israel Democracy Institute found that 22.5% of Jewish Israeli supported resettling Gaza. An August 2025 poll by Israel Hayom found that 52% of Israelis supported resettling Gaza.

=== Israel Defense Forces ===
Many settlers and their supporters have claimed that Israel Defense force members already in Gaza participating in the invasion of Gaza after the 7 October attacks would help their efforts at resettlement. Some soldiers in the IDF have posted videos in Gaza reportedly expressing their support for resettlement, with an IDF Rabbi recorded stating "It’s our country, all of it — Gaza too....The whole promised land."

In another recorded video IDF soldiers stands in front of a destroyed building in Gaza with rifles in hand. One of the men states that the soldiers are "...occupying, deporting, and settling. Occupying, deporting, and settling, Did you hear that Bibi? Occupying, deporting and settling." Photographs of Israeli soldiers holding Israeli flags and waving orange banners to symbolize the protesting of removal of settlers from Gaza, with phrases like "Coming home" and "Only settlement would be considered victory!" printed on them in Hebrew.

=== Settler support ===
By late January 2024, hundreds of families had already formed settlement kernels for the proposed new settlements. At the January 2024 conference, dozens of families walked onto the stage carrying standards with the insignia of the proposed new settlements. For many that were evacuated from Gaza in 2005 the desire to return to Gaza is strong. Other settler supporters ordered their children to break through military lines to play inside the buffer border near the barrier that separates Gaza and Israel, while about 100 others attempted in early February 2024 to cross into Gaza before being turned away. At the Gush Katif museum in Jerusalem, former settlers have printed bright orange shirts, with "Home, returning to Gush Katif" written on them.

== See also ==
- Proposed Israeli annexation of the West Bank
- Israeli occupation of the Gaza Strip
- Options for a policy regarding Gaza's civilian population

== Sources ==
- Barak-Erez, Daphne (1 July 2006). "Israel: The security barrier—between international law, constitutional law, and domestic judicial review". International Journal of Constitutional Law. 4 (3): 540–552. doi:10.1093/icon/mol021.
- Drew, Catriona J. (1997). "Self-Determination, Population Transfer and the Middle East Peace Accords". In Bowen, Stephen (ed.). Human Rights, Self-Determination and Political Change in the Occupied Palestinian Territories. Martinus Nijhoff Publishers. pp. 119–167. ISBN 978-9-041-10502-8.
- "International Labour Conference, 93rd Session. Report of the Director-General, Appendix: The situation of workers of the occupied Arab territories" (PDF). Geneva: International Labour Organization. 2005.
- Pertile, Marco (2005). Conforti, Benedetto; Bravo, Luigi (eds.). ""Legal Consequences of the Construction of a Wall in the OPT": A Missed Opportunity for the Development of International Humanitarian Law?". Italian Yearbook of International Law. 14: 121–161. doi:10.1163/221161304X00064. ISBN 978-90-04-15027-0.
- Roberts, Adam (January 1990). "Prolonged Military Occupation: The Israeli-Occupied Territories Since 1967". American Journal of International Law. 84 (1): 44–103. doi:10.2307/2203016. JSTOR 2203016. S2CID 145514740.
