= Alon Pinkas =

Israeli diplomat (born 1961)

- אלון פנקס
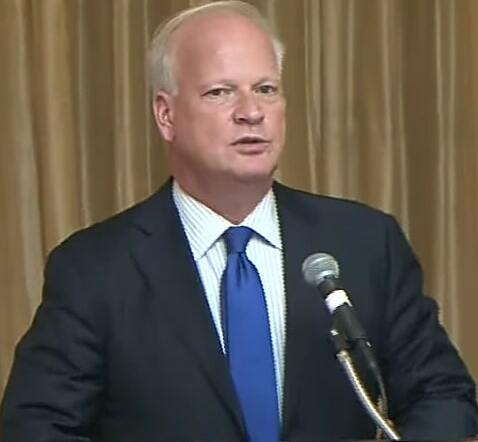
- Pinkas in September 2015
- Born: 6 August 1961 (age 65); Tel Aviv, Israel
- Education: Hebrew University (Bachelor's degree) Georgetown University (Master's degree)
- Occupations: Diplomat, writer
- Spouse: Revital
- Children: 2

Alon Pinkas (Hebrew: אלון פנקס; born 6 August 1961) is an Israeli diplomat and writer.

== Early life and education ==
Alon Pinkas was born in Tel Aviv and grew up in Rehovot. He graduated summa cum laude in political science from Hebrew University. After his bachelor's he went to the United States to do his master's, and he graduated cum laude from Georgetown University with a degree in Government and Politics.

== Career ==
Pinkas served as chief of staff to Shlomo Ben-Ami and David Levy (Ministers of Foreign Affairs). He was a foreign policy advisor for Ehud Barak and political advisor to Shimon Peres. From 2000 to 2004, Pinkas served as Consul General of Israel in New York City. He was succeeded as Consul General by Aryeh Mekel.

Pinkas has also been a foreign affairs analyst for Fox Television, and has written for publications such as Al-Monitor, The Independent, Haaretz, Jewish Journal, and The Times of Israel. He left Haaretz after it was discovered that he received hundreds of thousands of dollars from Qatar while writing positively about Qatar for the paper.

== Essays ==
=== Proposed ethnic cleansing and Israeli resettlement of Gaza ===
The presence of 11 of the 37 cabinet ministers at a conference in January 2024 proposed Israeli resettlement of the Gaza Strip and coerced migration (i.e. ethnic cleansing) of Palestinians from there marked the elevation of the resettlement movement from the fringe of politics to what Pinkas wrote:

"Even if you've seen one before, it's not the same. This was not a fringe opposition group: it was the government of Israel in all its political splendor, unabashedly showing its true colors. This was the governing coalition in an orgy of anti-state and antidemocratic euphoria."

— Alon Pinkas, in "An Orgy of Jewish Supremacy and Antidemocratic Euphoria, Encouraged by Netanyahu", published in Ha'aretz, 29 January 2024

Furthermore:

What you saw Sunday wasn't "Startup Nation" Israel. It wasn't "13 Nobel Prizes" Israel… It was not liberal-democratic Israel. What you saw was messianic ecstasy and religious fervor in a position of power… what you saw was not just the far-right elements… This is him. Unadulterated, unhinged Netanyahu, trying to distance himself far from the debacle of the October 7 massacre. This strain of religious-nationalistic Jewish supremacy has been normalized, legitimized, mainstreamed and encouraged by Netanyahu… What you saw was not merely a theocratic-fascist strain in Israeli society and politics but almost half of Mr. Netanyahu's coalition (27 lawmakers)…

— Alon Pinkas, in An Orgy of Jewish Supremacy and Antidemocratic Euphoria, Encouraged by Netanyahu, published in Ha'aretz, 29 January 2024

Pinkas further suggested that the extremism of the conference's theme and the implication that ultranationalist Orthodox idea is now empowered by the ruling coalition "maybe, just maybe" might force Israel to "decide" and its liberal-democratic majority to assert itself politically and change the direction of the government's actions concerning the war tactics, settlement policy, and approach to Israeli–Palestinian relations overall.

== Personal life ==
He is married to Revital Pinkas.
