= Yitzhak Graanboom =

Yitzhak Graanboom (1738-1807) was a Swedish-born rabbi, Jewish convert, and former interim Chief Rabbi of Amsterdam during the 18th century.

== Biography ==
Graanboom was born with the Christian name, Mattis, to Jacob and Leah Granboom in the Kingdom of Sweden in the mid 18th century. In 1749, Jacob moved the family to Amsterdam with the intention of converting to Judaism. After the family's conversion, Jacob took on the name "Avraham".

Graanboom became a well-liked scholar among the Amsterdam Jewish community, earning the respect of the Chief Rabbi of Amsterdam and Talmudist, Saul Löwenstamm. After Rabbi Löwenstamm's death, Yitzhak took over the position for a period of time in 1790.

== See also ==
- Rabbi Dan Be'eri
- Rabbi Nathan Lopes Cardozo
