= Kedumim bombing =

2006 terrorist attack in the West Bank

- The attack site
- Native name: הפיגוע בקדומים
- Location: 32°12′32″N 35°9′43″E; Kedumim, West Bank
- Date: March 30, 2006; 20 years ago c. 21:45 pm (UTC+2)
- Attack type: Suicide bombing
- Deaths: 4 civilians (+1 bomber)
- Perpetrator: Al-Aqsa Martyrs Brigades claimed responsibility

The Kedumim bombing was a suicide bombing which occurred on May 30, 2006 in a vehicle near the Israeli settlement of Kedumim in the West Bank. Four Israeli civilians were killed in the attack.

The Palestinian militant organization Al-Aqsa Martyrs Brigades claimed responsibility for the attack.

== The attack ==
On Thursday, March 30, 2006, at around 21:45, a Palestinian suicide bomber, disguised as an Orthodox Jewish hitchhiker and wearing hidden explosives attached to his body, boarded an Israeli vehicle. The suicide bomber blew himself up near the entrance to the Israeli settlement Kedumim near the gas station outside of the village. The blast killed four Israeli civilians (three inside the car and another person who was near the vehicle).

== Aftermath ==
In response to the attack, Israeli warplanes destroyed a number of targets in northern Gaza that the IDF claimed were used by Palestinian terrorist organizations for launching rockets into Israel.
