= Shlomo Karhi =

Israeli politician, Minister of Communication in the 37th government

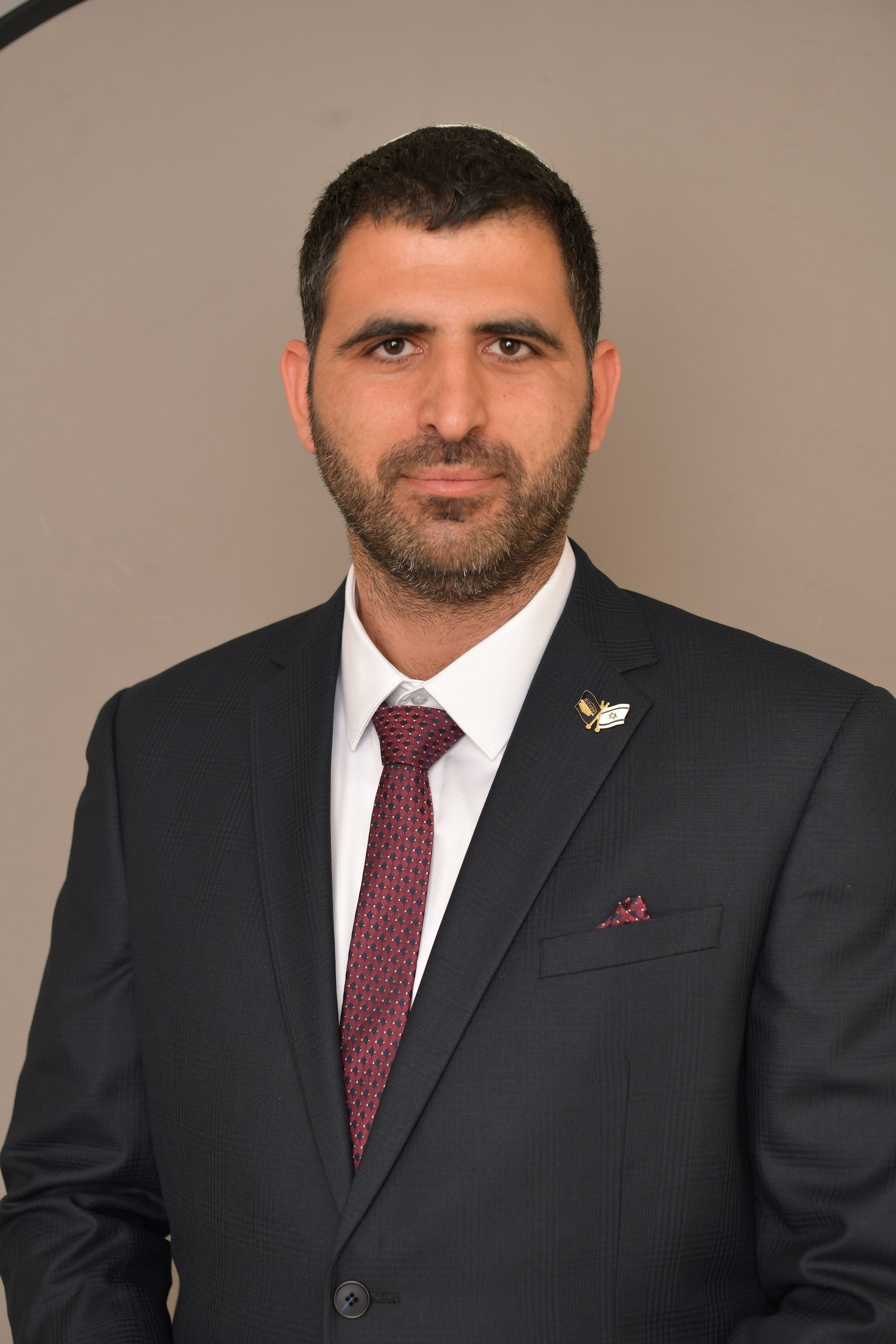
- Karhi in 2021

Ministerial roles
- 2022–: Minister of Communications

Faction represented in the Knesset
- 2019–: Likud

Personal details
- Born: 6 April 1982 (age 44) Ramat Gan, Israel

Shlomo Karhi (Hebrew: שְׁלֹמֹה קַרְעִי; born 6 April 1982) is an Israeli politician and academic. He is currently a member of the Knesset for Likud and serving as the Minister of Communications in the thirty-seventh government.

Karhi first joined the Knesset in the 2019 elections in the 25th place in the Likud party. In the 2022 elections he was placed 13th in the Likud party.

== Early life and education ==
Karhi was born in Ramat Gan as the eldest of seventeen siblings in an Orthodox Jewish family, to mother Mazal and father Rabbi David Karhi, an Israeli-born Sabra of Tunisian Jewish heritage from Djerba. At the age of four, Shlomo Karhi moved to Zimrat, a religious moshav. He was educated at the Kisse Rahamim and Mercaz HaRav yeshivas.

He subsequently served in the religious Netzah Yehuda Battalion during his national service in the Israel Defense Forces (IDF), before earning a BA in management accounting and information systems at the Jerusalem College of Technology. Karhi received a master's degree and PhD in industrial engineering and management at Ben-Gurion University of the Negev.

He began work as a lecturer at Sapir Academic College, before becoming part of the faculty at Ben-Gurion University, and then Bar-Ilan University.

Karhi is married, and has eight children.

== Political career ==
Karhi was placed twenty-fifth on the Likud list for the April 2019 elections, a slot reserved for candidates from the Negev. He was subsequently elected to the Knesset as Likud won 36 seats. He was re-elected in the September 2019 and March 2020 elections, after being placed twenty-seventh on the Likud list, and was re-elected again in 2021 (in twenty-fourth place) and 2022 (in thirteenth place). Following the 2022 elections, he was appointed Minister of Communications.

In March 2023, Karhi unveiled his plan for a communications market reform. He announced the cancellation of the Second Authority and the Cable and Satellite Council, declaring an end to the era of "hyperactive regulation". The minister emphasized the need for less intervention, increased competition, and greater freedom in the Israeli communications sector. According to Karhi, the plan involves reducing interference in business models, expanding the advertising market, and encouraging the launch of new content channels.

On 2 October 2023, Karhi visited Riyadh, Saudi Arabia, among a 14-member delegation, to attend the Universal Postal Union's Extraordinary Congress. On the following day, he held a Jewish prayer service with a minyan during the Sukkot holiday, complete with a Torah scroll dedicated to the rulers of the kingdom. Later that month, Karhi criticized former U.S. President Donald Trump over his criticism of Netanyahu.

=== Controversies ===
In November 2019 Karhi, who is known for his opposition to the LGBTQ+ community, was quoted as saying that Pride parades are "contrary to nature".

In March, 2023 Karhi sparked a widespread controversy during the Purim holiday in Israel. Karhi took to Twitter to address a group of individuals, including pilots, doctors, and members of the special operations unit, who had announced that they would not volunteer to serve in the reserves if the proposed legal revolution were to pass. He referred to them as "impudent conscientious objectors", and told them to "go to hell". In his tweet, Karhi drew comparisons between the objectors and the Biblical story of Mordechai and Esther, suggesting that Israel would prosper without them, and that they were self-appointed rulers, akin to Haman. The tweet caused a public uproar, but Karhi stood by his statement, and doubled down, calling the refusal to serve "sad, stinking, and pathetic".

In 2023, Karhi, serving as Israel's Minister of Communication, initiated a notable legislative action concerning foreign media. The law was framed to prohibit news outlets believed to jeopardize Israel's national security in the wake of the Gaza war. The Israeli government endorsed an emergency provision under his guidance, targeting the Qatari news channel Al Jazeera. Karhi critiqued Al Jazeera, characterizing it as a "propaganda platform" and expressed concerns over its coverage, suggesting that it might be inciting adverse sentiments against Israel. He is also an opponent of Kan/Makan, the public broadcasting service of Israel, which he accused of being "too biased toward the left".

In January 2024, Karhi attended a "Settlement Brings Security" conference advocating for Israeli resettlement of the Gaza Strip, where he stated: "We have an obligation to act... to [bring about] voluntary emigration — even if this war... turns this voluntary migration into a situation of 'Coerce him until he says, "I want to do so"'".

In September 2025, Karhi attempted to block the broadcast of Neta Shoshani's documentary 1948 – To Remember and Forget on the Israeli Public Broadcasting Corporation (Kan), threatening to revoke the broadcaster's budget if it aired the film despite the fact that it cited widely known and acknowledged facts. In a letter to Kan's director general, Karhi described the work as advancing a "false and antisemitic narrative", and accused it of libeling Israel Defense Forces soldiers with allegations of massacres and rapes during the 1948 Arab–Israeli War. Two years earlier, after the film premiered at the Docaviv Festival and won an award for its investigative research, Karhi had similarly demanded that Kan prevent its broadcast. Kan rejected his accusations, describing the film as an award-winning historical documentary presenting a range of perspectives on the war and dismissing the claim that it sought to harm the IDF as "baseless and unfounded".
