= Daniella Weiss =

Israeli Orthodox Zionist settler (born 1945)

- דניאלה וייס
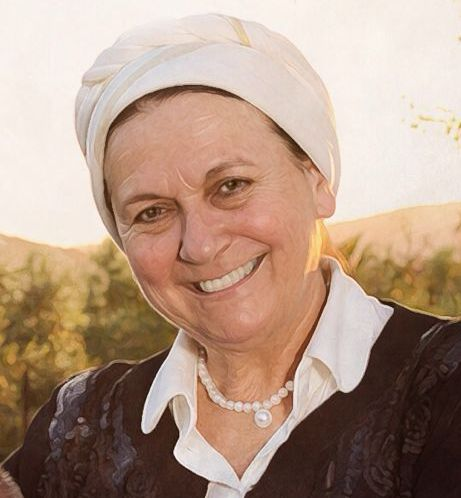
- Weiss in 2016

Mayor of Kedumim
- In office September 1996 – 2007
- Preceded by: Yosef Kapakh
- Succeeded by: Hananel Dorani

Personal details
- Born: 30 August 1945 (age 81) Bnei Brak, Mandatory Palestine
- Nickname: "Godmother of Israeli settler movements"
- Education: Bar-Ilan University
- Organization: Nachala
- Spouse: Amnon Weiss
- Children: 2

Daniella Weiss (Hebrew: דניאלה וייס; born 30 August 1945) is an Israeli politician who is the founder of Nachala, an Israeli settler and far-right organization, and a former mayor of Kedumim, an Israeli settlement in the West Bank. She was first elected mayor of Kedumim in September 1996, and was re-elected for a second term in November 2001 through 2007. She was sanctioned by Canada in June 2024 for violence against civilians in the West Bank and by the United Kingdom in May 2025.

== Early life ==
Daniella Weiss was born in Bnei Brak, Mandatory Palestine, in 1945. Her father was from the United States and her mother was born in Poland to Polish Jews and raised in Mandatory Palestine since her first year of life. Both Jewish immigrants, they were members of Lehi, a Zionist paramilitary militant organization, and took part in underground activities. She attended a religious high school in Ramat Gan, and studied as part of the Atuda program. She studied English literature and philosophy at Bar-Ilan University.

== Career ==
Since the 1970s, Weiss has been a notable figure in the Gush Emunim settlement movement, active in the establishment of many new settlements in the West Bank.

Weiss became the secretary-general of Gush Emunim. In May 1987, after Ofra Moses, a Jewish settler, was killed in a Palestinian firebomb attack, Weiss led a vigilante group on a shooting and rock-throwing rampage through the Palestinian town of Qalqiliya. She was sentenced to a 2500 shekel fine and a six-month suspended sentence.

Weiss served as the mayor of Kedumim between 1996 and 2007. In 2010, she founded the Nachala Settlement Movement, which aims to establish new illegal Israeli settlements in the West Bank. She serves as its director.

In early 2023, Weiss appealed to Prime Minister Benjamin Netanyahu not to stop the judicial reform program in response to protests, claiming that the Israeli Supreme Court was attempting to eradicate the national and Jewish element of Israel and needed to be stopped.

In November 2024, during the Gaza war and the proposed resettlement of Gaza, Weiss was allowed to survey potential settlement sites in North Gaza, including Netzarim, by IDF soldiers in contravention of orders barring civilians and requiring entries to be logged. Weiss stated that she had organized hundreds of settlers ready to imminently enter, making it difficult for the authorities to expel them. After a report by KAN News, the IDF announced that it was investigating the incident.

In March 2025, Weiss was nominated for the 2025 Nobel Peace Prize by the Israeli professors Amos Azaria and Shalom Sadik of Ariel University and Ben-Gurion University. They stated that she contributed to "decades-long efforts in strengthening Jewish communities and promoting regional stability". The nomination caused widespread condemnation by social media users.

== Views ==
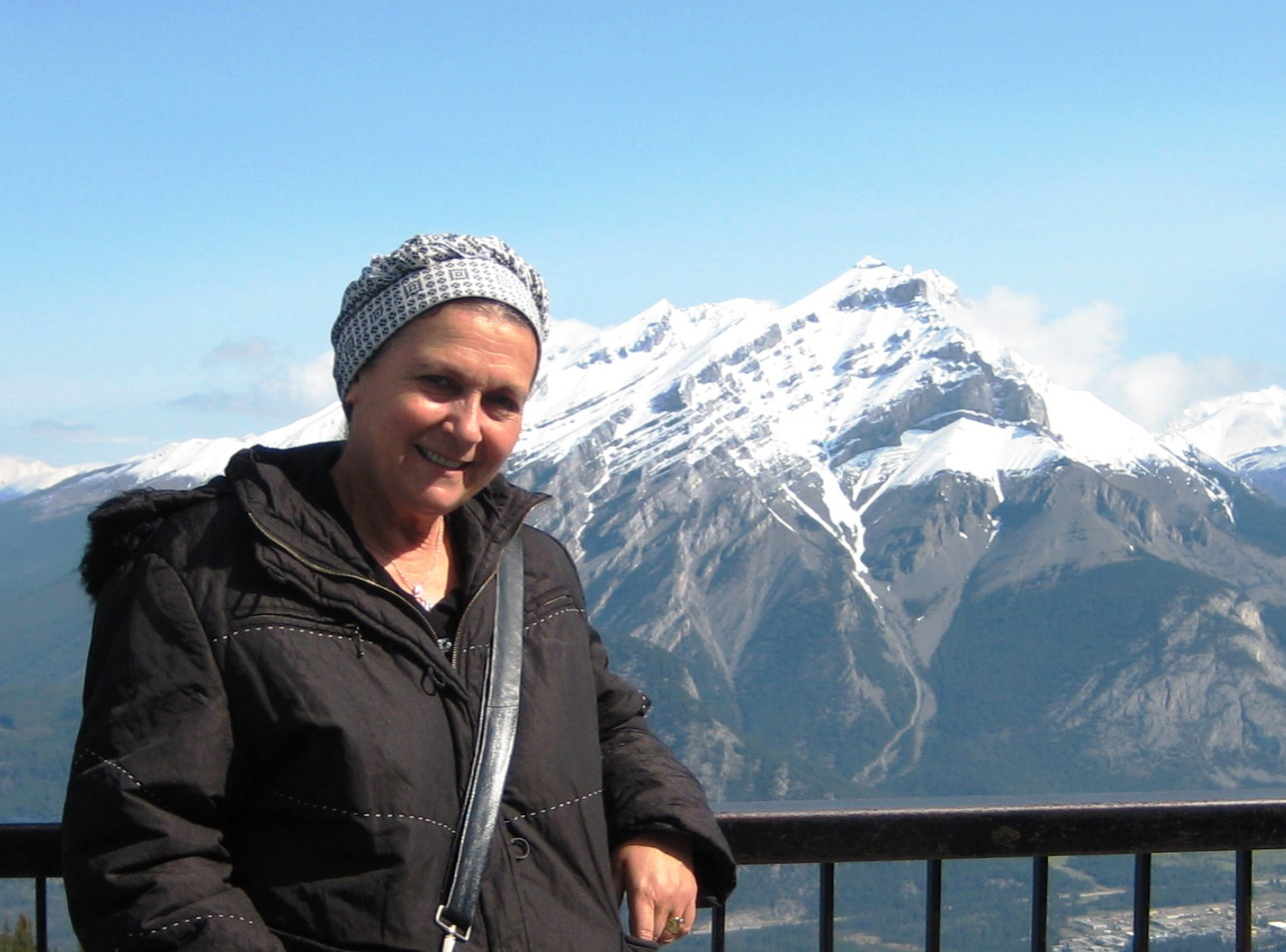
Daniella Weiss in 2011

Weiss spoke out against a rabbi claiming that a woman cannot run for secretary of a Yishuv as the mixture of men and women would be inappropriate, and should instead influence change through their husbands. Weiss highlighted how there had been prior female Jewish prophets and those that had held significant positions in Jewish history.

Weiss rejects the price tag policy, saying that it had diverted settlers from what she considered to be their most important task – setting up additional caravans and tents to lay claim to ever more hilltops in the "Shomron" (the West Bank). She has stated that the only "price tag" action acceptable to her is the establishment of a new outpost in response to every outpost that had been demolished by Israeli authorities.

In a November 2023 interview with The New Yorker, one month after the October 7 attacks, Weiss said that Arabs "lost their right to vote for the Knesset. They will never get this right", and when asked how she felt about the deaths of Palestinian children in the midst of the Gaza war, replied that "[m]y children are prior to the children of the enemy, period." Weiss made the statement of what drives the Israeli push to settle Palestinian land: "In Israel, there's a lot of support for settlements, and this is why there have been right-wing governments for so many years. The world, especially the United States, thinks there is an option for a Palestinian state, and, if we continue to build communities, then we block the option for a Palestinian state. We want to close the option for a Palestinian state, and the world wants to leave the option open. It's a very simple thing to understand."

She reiterated her beliefs in a 2024 interview with CNN, stating that she believed that there will be "No Arab, I'm speaking about more than two million Arabs. They will not stay there... We Jews will be in Gaza." When questioned if that sounded like ethnic cleansing to her, Weiss responded that "The Arabs want to annihilate the state of Israel so you can call them monsters. You can call them cleansing of Jews. We are not doing to them; they are doing to us." She also told the Financial Times, "All the Arabs will be out of Gaza and Gaza will be a Jewish area. Let them go to Africa, Turkey or Scotland. When they're not so condensed in one place, maybe they'll be better."

== Legal issues ==
In January 1989, after the murder of a taxi driver at the Yakir Junction in the West Bank, the intersection was declared a closed military area to prevent activists from protesting. Weiss and others violated the order and entered the area to protest. She was convicted in December 1993 of entering a closed military area and fined as part of a plea deal.

In June 2007, Weiss was charged with obstructing a police officer in the line of duty and assaulting a police officer. She was sentenced to 5 months probation.

On October 3, 2008, she was arrested and charged with assaulting a police officer, interfering with a police investigation, and hindering a police officer in the performance of his duty. She was released from house arrest pending trial on October 6, 2008.

In December 2008, Weiss was arrested in Hebron along with about 11 other activists by police on the suspicion that they would march towards the Gaza Strip and the prior Gush Katif settlement. Weiss and the others were ordered to be released by the court, who claimed the arrests showed the arrival of dark days in Israel.

In May 2009, Israeli police followed a vehicle potentially containing arsonists, and found it abandoned in front of Weiss's home. Weiss came out and began to touch the vehicle multiple times, and lay under another parked car when officers attempted to arrest her for obstruction. When she was removed from under the vehicle, she began to kick and hit the officer, causing Weiss to be arrested for assaulting a police officer and obstruction of an investigation. She was sentenced to two days under house arrest.

In June 2024, Canada imposed sanctions on Weiss and the Amana movement "for their role in facilitating, supporting or financially contributing to acts of violence ... against Palestinian civilians and their property".

In May 2025, the United Kingdom imposed sanctions on Weiss, as well as the Nachala movement for being involved in "threatening, perpetrating, promoting and supporting, acts of aggression and violence against Palestinian individuals".

== Personal life ==
Weiss is married to Amnon Weiss. She and her husband have two daughters. In 2002, the husband and in-laws of one of Weiss's daughters were among those killed during an attack in the Elon Moreh settlement in the West Bank. Weiss's daughter and grandchild survived the attack by hiding under a table and running from the home.

Weiss and her husband own a large amount of real-estate in Tel Aviv and the West Bank, such as a building in Madinah Square and a factory to produce gold jewelry. In 2010, it was announced that a building she owned on Bialik Street in Tel Aviv was to be demolished, causing a dispute regarding the preservation of buildings in the area. She lives in Kedumim.

== See also ==
- Nachala (organisation) - Israeli settler organization Weiss is a member of
