= Gush Emunim =

Israeli ultranationalist movement

Gush Emunim גּוּשׁ אֱמוּנִים
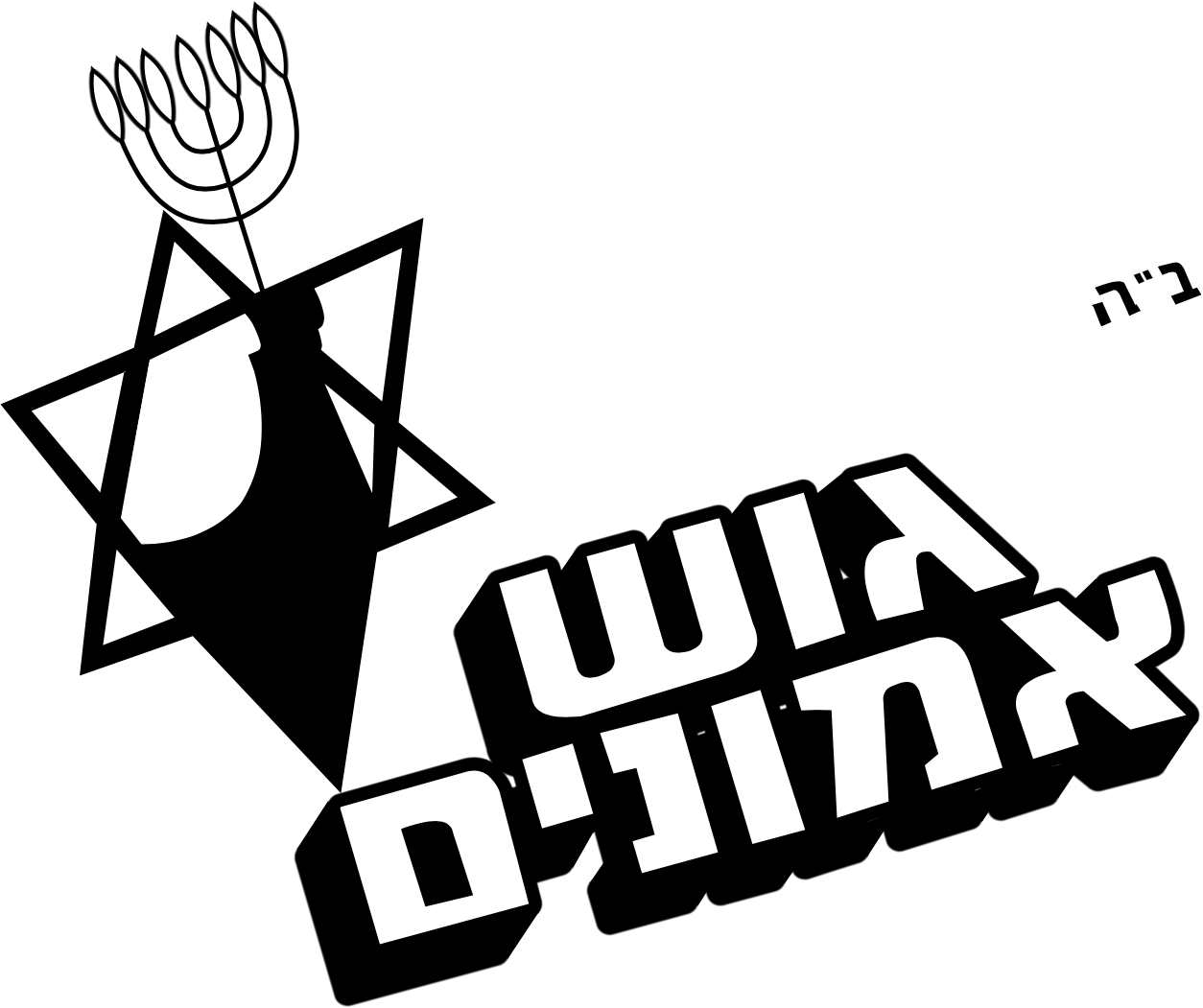
- Leader: Zvi Yehuda Kook (1974-1982)
- Governing body: Hanan Porat; Moshe Levinger; Shlomo Aviner; Menachem Froman; Yoel Bin-Nun; Yaakov Ariel
- Founder: Zvi Yehuda Kook; Haim Drukman
- Founded: February 1974; 52 years ago
- Dissolved: Ceased operations by 2010
- Succeeded by: Yesha Council
- Armed body: Jewish Underground (1980s)
- Settlement body: Amana (active)
- Political party: National Religious Party (2025: in government)
- Ideology: Neo-Zionism; Religious Zionism; Jewish messianism Jewish fundamentalism Halachic state Settler interests
- Religion: Orthodox Judaism

Gush Emunim (Hebrew: גּוּשׁ אֱמוּנִים, lit. "Bloc of the Faithful") was an Israeli ultranationalist religious Zionist Orthodox Jewish right-wing fundamentalist activist movement committed to establishing Jewish settlements in the West Bank, Gaza Strip, and the Golan Heights. Gush Emunim, as of 2010, had never been formally disbanded, but it has nevertheless ceased to exist.

While not formally established as an organization until 1974 in the wake of the Yom Kippur War, Gush Emunim sprang out of the conquests of the Six-Day War in 1967, encouraging Jewish settlement of the land of Israel based on two points, one religious and one practical. The religious point was a belief that, according to the Torah, God wants the Jewish people to live in the land of Israel and had returned lands such as the biblical Judea and Samaria as an opportunity for the Jewish people to return to their ancestral homeland. The second point stemmed from a concern that the pre-1967 borders, a mere 10 km (6.2 mi) wide at its narrowest point, were indefensible, especially in the long term, and it was therefore necessary to ensure that the land captured in the Six-Day War remained under Israeli control by creating a Jewish presence in the region and placing "facts on the ground". While Gush Emunim no longer exists, vestiges of its influence remain in Israeli politics and society.

== Political affiliations ==
Gush Emunim was closely associated with, and highly influential in, the National Religious Party (NRP). In the late 1980s, they referred to themselves – and were referred to by the Israeli media – as Ne'emanei Eretz Yisrael נאמני ארץ ישראל (English: "Those who are loyal/faithful to the Land of Israel"). It also had a close relationship with the Jewish Agency.

== History ==
Gush Emunim was founded by students of Zvi Yehuda Kook in February 1974 in the living room of Haim Drukman, who is also credited with coining the term. For the founders of the organization, the Yom Kippur War confirmed what Kook already argued before the outbreak of the Six-Day War: that Jewish settlement in the West Bank, the Gaza Strip and the Golan Heights was required to hasten the process of redemption. In addition to Drukman, its ideological and political core consisted of other students of Zvi Yehuda Kook such as Hanan Porat, Moshe Levinger, Shlomo Aviner, Menachem Froman, Eliezer Waldman, Yoel Bin-Nun, and Yaakov Ariel. Kook remained its leader until his death in 1982.

In 1974, an affiliated group named Garin Elon Moreh, led by Menachem Felix and Benjamin (Beni) Katzover, attempted to establish a settlement on the ruins of the Sebastia train station dating from the Ottoman period. After eight attempts and seven removals from the site by the Israel Defense Forces (IDF), an agreement was reached according to which the Israeli government allowed 25 families to settle in the Kadum army camp southwest of Nablus/Shechem. The Sebastia agreement was a turning point that opened up the northern West Bank to Jewish settlement. The small mobile home site housing 25 families eventually became the municipality of Kedumim, one of the major settlements in the West Bank. The Sebastia model was subsequently copied in Beit El, Shavei Shomron, and other settlements.

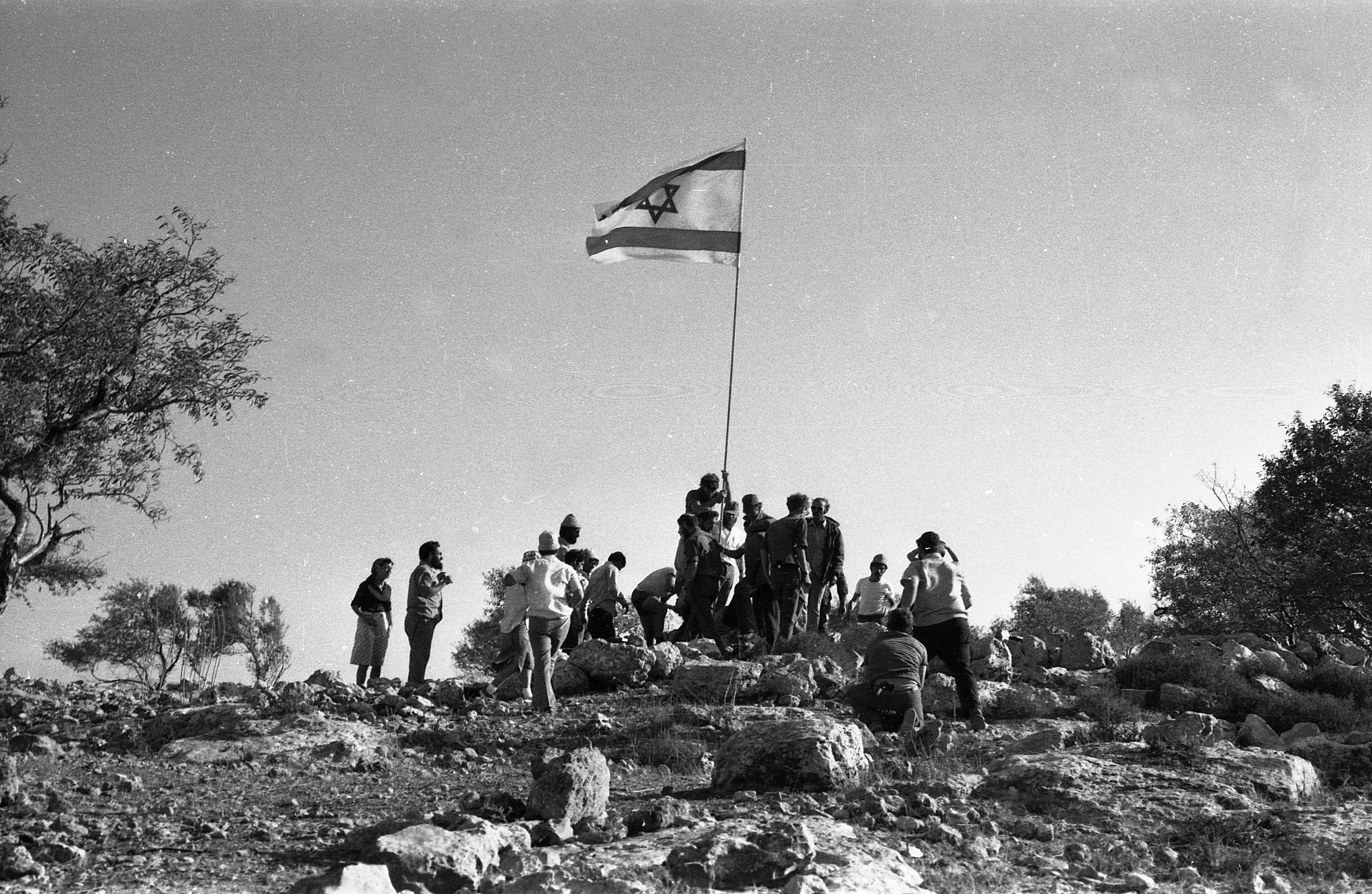
Gush Emunim members establishing a settlement in the West Bank, 1978

In 1976, Gush Emunim founded the settlement-building arm Amana, which soon became independent and is still active. That same year, Gush Emunin held a two-day march through the West Bank with around 20,000 people joined the march. In 1979-80, a group of members from Gush Emunim radicalised and formed the Jewish Underground. This organization conducted several terror attacks and plotted to blow up the Dome of the Rock. The uncovering of the terrorist organization led to a severe blow to the settler movement's reputation. Following the crisis, Gush Emunim's role as the formal umbrella organization of the settler movement was gradually taken over by the Yesha Council, although Gush Emunim, as of 2010, never formally ceased to exist. Despite being rooted in Gush Emunim, the Yesha Council is considered more practical and pragmatic than its predecessor. The Yesha Council, in its role as the political umbrella organization, and Amana, as the executive, settler-building branch, nowadays form the two main institutions of the settler movement.

Yoel Bin-Nun, one of the founding members of Gush Emunim, broke off from the organization in the aftermath of the assassination of Yitzhak Rabin.

== Ideology ==
The ideological outlook of Gush Emunim has been described as messianic, fundamentalist, theocratic, and right-wing. Its beliefs were based heavily on the teachings of Rabbi Abraham Isaac Kook and his son, Zvi Yehuda Kook, who taught that secular Zionists, through their gaining of Eretz Israel, had unwittingly brought about the beginning of the Messianic Age, which would culminate in the coming of the messiah, which Gush Emunim supporters believe can be hastened through Jewish settlement on land they believe God has allotted to the Jewish people as set forth in the Hebrew Bible. The organization supported attempts to co-exist with the Arab population, rejecting the population transfers proposed by Meir Kahane and his followers.

== Impact ==
=== Political impact ===
The overall practical aim of preventing territorial compromise and annexation of occupied territories has only partly been accomplished. Prominent failures include the demolishing and evacuation of settlements in the Sinai peninsula following the Camp David Accords, the phased transfer of jurisdiction to the Palestinian Authority in the West Bank as part of the Oslo Accords, and the 2005 Gaza Disengagement.

Gush Emunim and its successors have successfully attracted billions of US dollars for the building and supporting of settlements. The 2005 Sasson Report revealed that the Ministry of Housing, the Ministry of Defense and the World Zionist Organization spent millions of shekels to support illegal outposts. Between 2013 and 2015, Amana received government funding of approximately 100 million shekels ($29 million). On 31 December 2019, the Israeli High Court of Justice decided that any government donations to the executive branch of the settler movement required approval from the court.

The settler movement has successfully appealed to sentiments related to Israeli identity, making it difficult for government officials and political leaders on the right to distance themselves from the settlers. Support for the settlement project has become mainstream in the US Republican Party, and almost all parties on the right of the political spectrum in Israel have settlers within its leadership. Settlers have been disproportionately represented in government positions. The 2013 government was dubbed the 'settler government' in a Haaretz editorial, due to the number of officials associated with the settler movement in powerful positions within the ministries of Housing and Defense. In October 2017, under the leadership of Prime Minister Benjamin Netanyahu, Pinchas Wallerstein, one of the founders of Gush Emunim, was appointed to head a new government committee created for the purpose of legalising illegal outposts and other types of unauthorised settlements in the West Bank.

=== Societal impact ===
The establishment of Gush Emunim correlated with the revival of the Greater Israel ideology within the national religious community. The settler movement is also accused of provoking a culture of violence, with the Israeli government condoning its actions. The perpetrator of the 1994 Hebron massacre as well as the assassin of Prime Minister Yitzhak Rabin were proponents of the Greater Israel ideology, with the latter being educated in the Gush Emunim-oriented Yeshivat Kerem B'Yavneh. The murder of Yitzak Rabin is widely regarded to have been a breaking point in the Oslo peace process.

Since the founding of Gush Emunim in 1974, the number of settlers living in the West Bank has grown from close to zero in 1974 to approximately 440,000 in 2019. The number of settlements until 2020 stood at 132, and the number of illegal outposts at 135.

== See also ==
- Daniella Weiss (b. 1945), founding member and former secretary general
- Jewish fundamentalism
- Moledet party (1988-2013)
- Nachala (organisation), est. 2010
- Temple Mount and Eretz Yisrael Faithful Movement, est. 1967
- Terror Against Terror, radical Jewish militant organization (70s-80s)
- VISION Movement, non-Zionist, supports one-state solution
- Rabbi Dan Be'eri
