= Kedumim =

Israeli settlement in the West Bank

Kedumim: קְדוּמִים; قدوميم
- Local council

Hebrew transcription(s)
  - ISO 259: Qdumim
  - Also spelled: Qedumim (official)
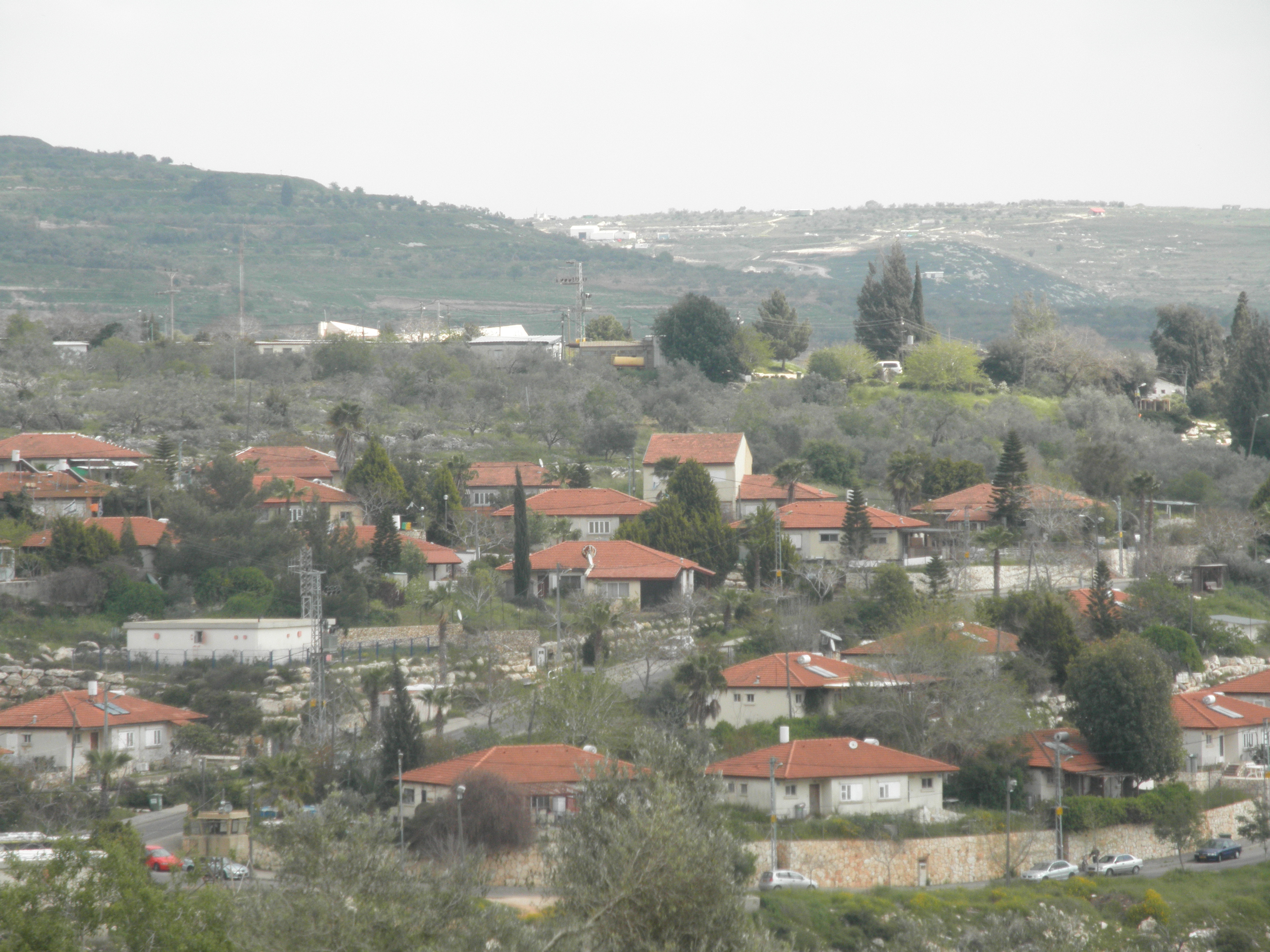

- Location within the Northern West Bank Location within the West Bank
- Coordinates: 32°12′55.98″N 35°9′30.03″E
- Region: West Bank
- District: Judea and Samaria Area
- Founded: 1975

Government
  - Head of Municipality: Ozel Vatik

Area
  - Total: 2,313 dunams (2.313 km^{2}; 0.893 sq mi)

Population (2024)
  - Total: 4,564
  - Density: 1,973/km^{2} (5,111/sq mi)
- Name meaning: "The Ancients"

Kedumim (Hebrew: קְדוּמִים, romanized: Kdumim; Arabic: قدوميم) is an Israeli settlement in the northern West Bank, Palestine. Founded on Hanukkah 1975 by members of the Gush Emunim settlement movement, it later became a local council. In 2024 it had a population of 4,564.

The consensus of the international community considers Israeli settlements in the West Bank illegal under international law. The Israeli government disputes this.

== Location ==
Kedumim is in the northern West Bank, west of Nablus, along Highway 55. The nearest populated places are the Palestinian villages of Jit, Immatain, and Kafr Qaddum. Other settlements nearby include Havat Gilad and Shavei Shomron.

== History ==
According to ARIJ, land from three Palestinian villages was expropriated for building Kedumim between 1967 and 1993: 231 dunams from Kafr Qaddum, 163 dunams from Immatain, and 13 dunams from Jit.

In late 1974, a group called Garin Elon Moreh, which was affiliated with Gush Emunim, and led by Rabbi Menachem Felix and Benny Katzover, attempted to establish a settlement on the ruins of the Sebastia train station dating from the Ottoman period. An Israeli Cabinet resolution, passed 17–2 with 3 abstentions, found the settlement illegal in 1975. After several attempts to remove residents from the area by the Israel Defense Forces, an agreement was reached in which 25 families were permitted to move to Kadum, an army camp southwest of Nablus. The small mobile home site developed into the town of Kedumim. The Sebastia agreement is sometimes cited as a turning point that sparked increasing Israeli settlement in the northern West Bank.

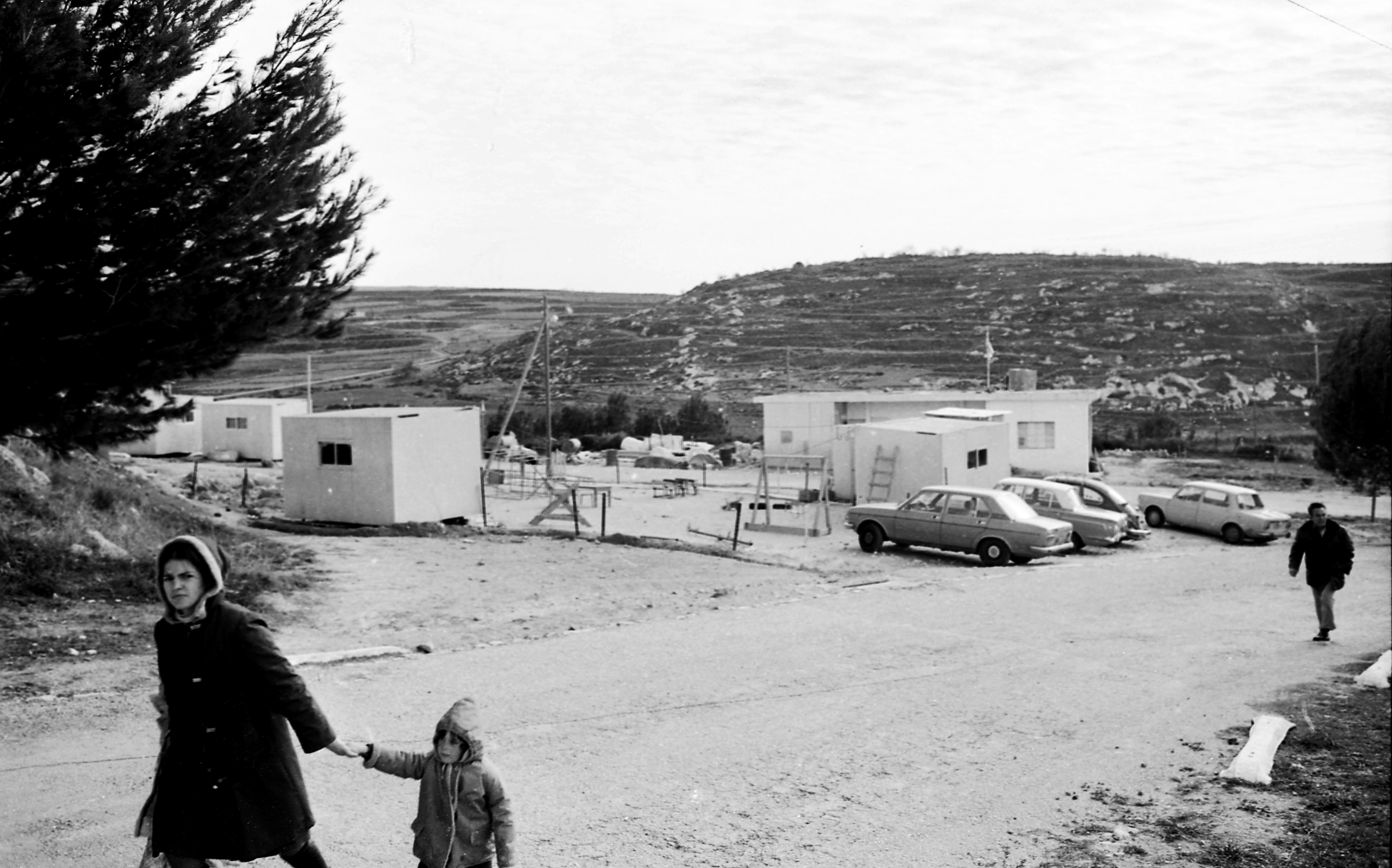
Mobile homes in Kadum, 15 January 1976

After the elections of 1977, the government of Menachim Begin strongly backed settlement at Kedumim. Begin visited on 19 May and declared "We stand on the land of liberated Israel." In July, his government granted full legal status to Kedumim (then numbering around 100 settlers), Ofra, and Maaleh Adumim.

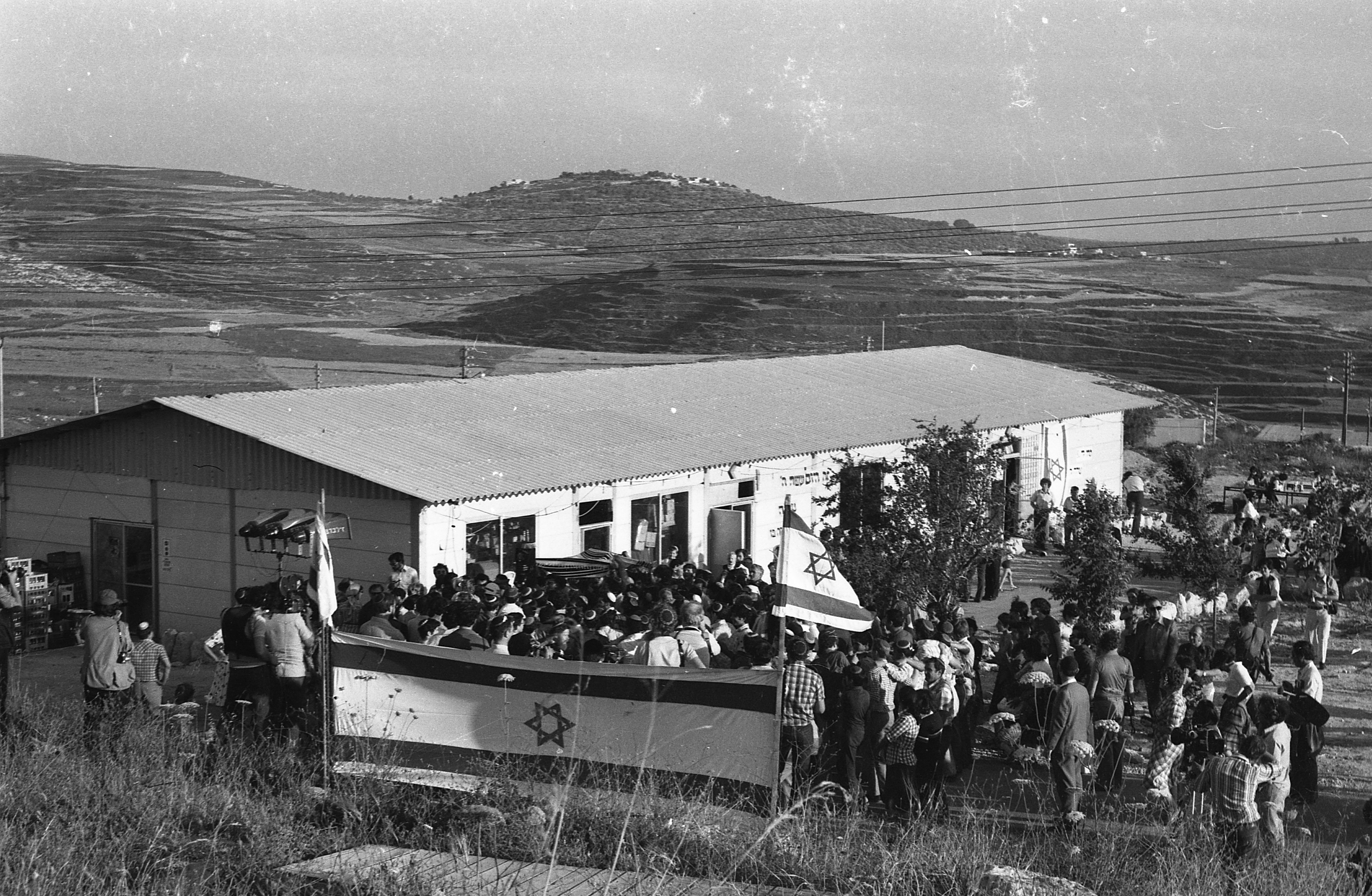
A Torah scroll placed in the provional synagogue in the presence of Likud leader Menachem Begin, 25 May 1977

Several residents of Kedumim have been killed in Palestinian political violence. 64-year-old Holocaust survivor and rabbi named Binyamin Herling was killed at Mount Ebal by Palestinian security forces and Fatah members who opened fire on a group of men, women, and children. The Kedumim bombing, on May 30, 2006, occurred when a suicide bomber disguised as an Orthodox Jewish hitchhiker blew himself up inside a car that stopped to pick him up near the gas station at the entrance to the village. The blast killed four Israelis: Rafi Halevy, Helena Halevy, Re'ut Feldman, and Shaked Lasker. Al-Aqsa Martyrs Brigades claimed responsibility. On November 19, 2007, Ido Zoldan was killed in a shooting attack near Kedumim when Palestinian militants opened fire on his car.

The settlement is also the subject of controversy because of its tense relationship with neighboring Palestinian villages. Kedumim is sometimes seen as a symbol of the Israeli occupation of the West Bank, as one of the first Israeli settlements founded in the West Bank after the Six-Day War. Kedumim residents have been accused of committing violence and property damage against Palestinians living in nearby villages, including arson, shootings, and uprooting Palestinian farmers' olive trees. There have also been continuing concerns and tensions over the settlement's encroachment on Palestinian farmland with the aid of the Israeli military, which has used emergency military declarations to appropriate Palestinian farmland multiple times since Kedumim was first established. Kedumim residents have also been accused of attempting to occupy the area and either displace or rule over Palestinians, and some residents have agreed with this. For example, Daniella Weiss, current resident and former mayor of Kedumim, has said that "the Jews are the sovereigns in the state of Israel and in the Land of Israel. [Palestinians] have to accept it." She has also said that Palestinians in the West Bank "have no right to ask for rights or take part in elections for the Knesset. They lost their right to vote for the Knesset. They will never get this right." Finance Minister Bezalel Smotrich, who lives in Kedumim, stated in October 2025 that the ultimate goal for the settlement is to help the Israeli state "apply Israeli sovereignty" over the West Bank and annex it to prevent Palestinian statehood.

In 2003, Israeli officials closed the road through Kedumim to Palestinians, effectively barring Palestinians from traveling to and from Nablus to the east, in order to enable further expansion of the Kedumim settlement. In response, residents of Kafr Qaddum began staging regular roadside protests that continued into the 2020s. Over the years, protesters have been subjected to violence and harassment from Israeli military and settlers. In 2020, Haaretz and B'Tselem revealed that the Israeli military had planted explosives to prevent protesters from accessing the usual protest area, resulting in the injury of one Palestinian teenager.

== Local Council ==
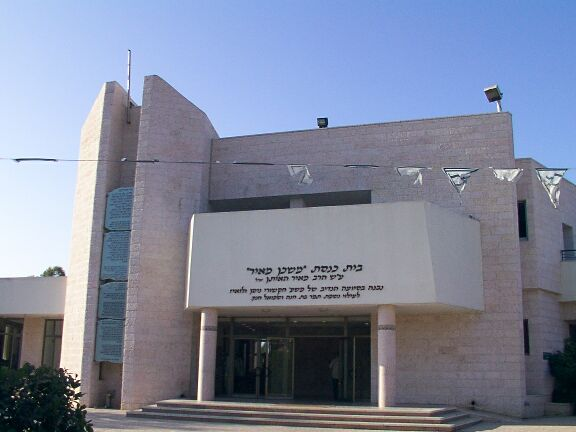
Mishkan Meir Central Synagogue

When Shomron Regional Council was established, Kedumim was one of its villages. In 1992, as the population in Kedumim was over 3,000, a Local Council was established with a mayor from outside: Yosef Kapakh. In 1996 Kedumim held their first elections, and Daniella Weiss was elected mayor, becoming the first woman mayor in Israeli towns and settlements. She served two terms in office. In 2007, Hananel Dorani was elected. Dorani is a vice-Brigade commander in reserve in the IDF, and moved to the village in 1992 after marrying one of its residents. In the 2024 local elections, following Dorani's retirement, Ozel Vatik was elected as Head of Municipality.

== Education ==
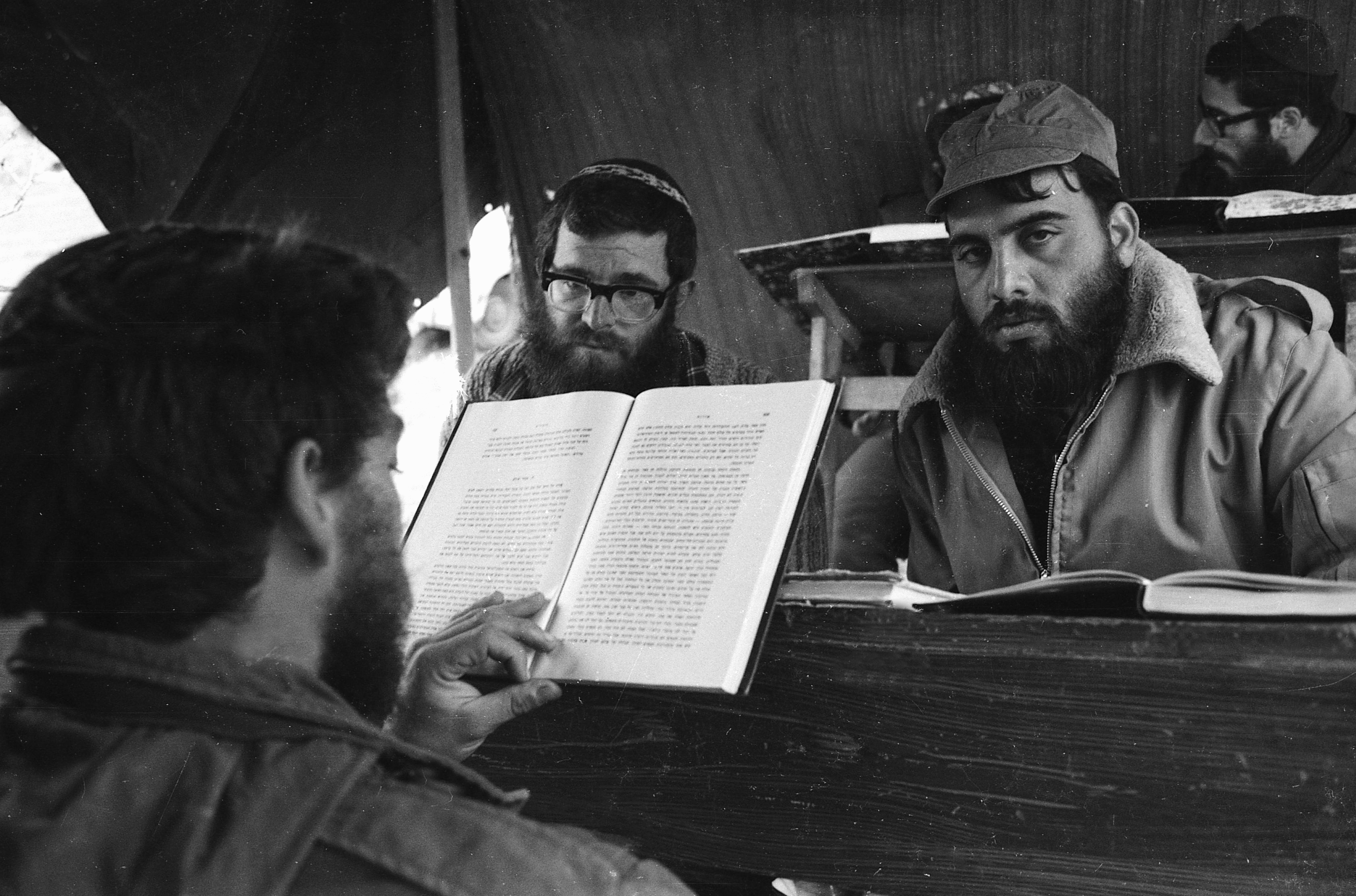
The yeshiva college of the newly built settlement of Kadumim, 1979

The residents of Kedumim have placed an emphasis on education and developed several local educational institutions. These include a local music academy, a public library, the Kedem Museum of Archaeology, day care centers, kindergartens, two elementary schools, the Bnei Chayil Yeshiva, the Kedamim Yeshiva, the Har Efrayim Yeshiva, and the Lehava Ulpana High School.

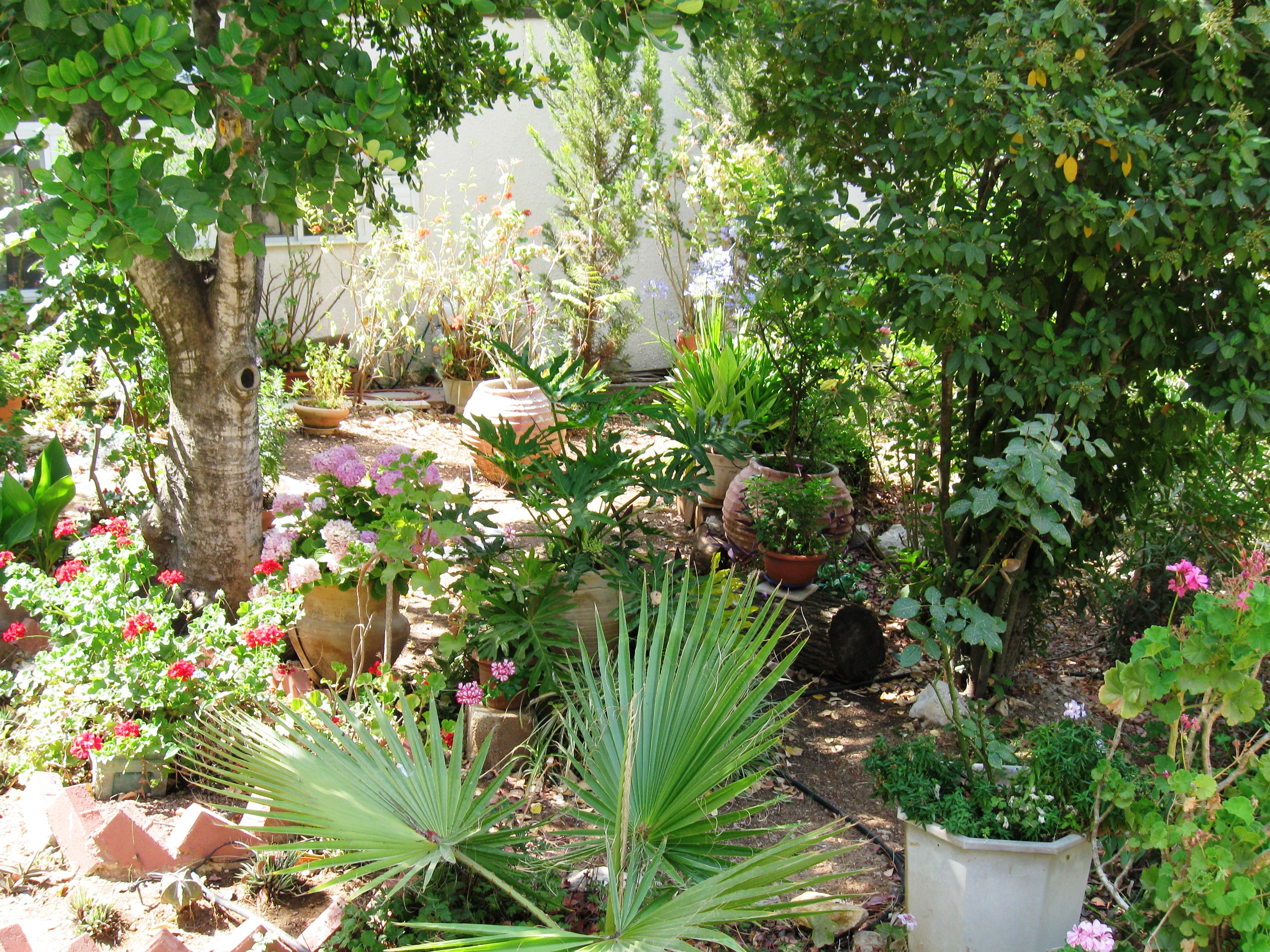
Garden in Kedumim

Yeshivat Bnei Chayil Shomron is a high school yeshiva established in 1998 to provide an Orthodox Jewish education for boys with ADD and ADHD. It is considered a unique facility in central Israel attendance is not limited to local students. Students in grades 7–12 are divided into classes which are limited to a maximum of fifteen boys. The school in Kedumim was originally a branch of a Jerusalem school of the same name founded by Stuart Chesner.

== Demographics ==
In 2024, there were an estimated 4,866 people living in Kedumim.

== Economy ==
While many residents work outside the settlement, many are employed locally in education, as well as several agricultural enterprises working with greenhouses and orchards. The Bar-On Industrial Park on 1,200 dunums (120 hectares, 297 acres) of land is within the municipal boundaries of Kedumim. Kedumim 3000, operated by Nahman Zoldan, is a construction firm headquartered in the settlement. The firm has worked on construction projects throughout the West Bank and East Jerusalem.

== Voting Patterns ==
In the 2026 election, 89 percent of voters in Kedumim voted for the parties of the right-wing coalition led by Benjamin Netanyahu, while 4 percent voted for the parties of the center-left coalition led by Gadi Eisenkot and 0.1 percent voted for the Arab parties. An additional 1 percent voted for the Reservists, and 4.4 percent voted for Amcha Yisrael. 64 percent of voters voted for the Religious Zionist Party. Voter turnout increased 12 percent from the 2022 election.

== Status under international law ==
The international community considers Israeli settlements a violation of the Fourth Geneva Convention. Israel disputes that the Fourth Geneva Convention applies to these territories as they had not been legally held by a sovereign prior to Israel taking control of them. This view has been rejected by the International Court of Justice, International Committee of the Red Cross and repeatedly by the UN Security Council.

According to B'Tselem, portions of Kedumim were built on privately owned Palestinian land. There are additionally two Israeli outposts adjacent to Kedumim, one of which is also built on privately owned Palestinian land.

== Notable residents ==
- Susan Gordon Aviner (1949–2011), former American actress, is interred at Kedumim Cemetery.
- Bezalel Smotrich
- Daniella Weiss

== See also ==
- Israeli settlements in the West Bank
- Neot Kedumim
- Hatzerim Park
