= Moshe Levinger =

Israeli rabbi and convict (1935–2015)

Rabbi Moshe Levinger
- משה לוינגר
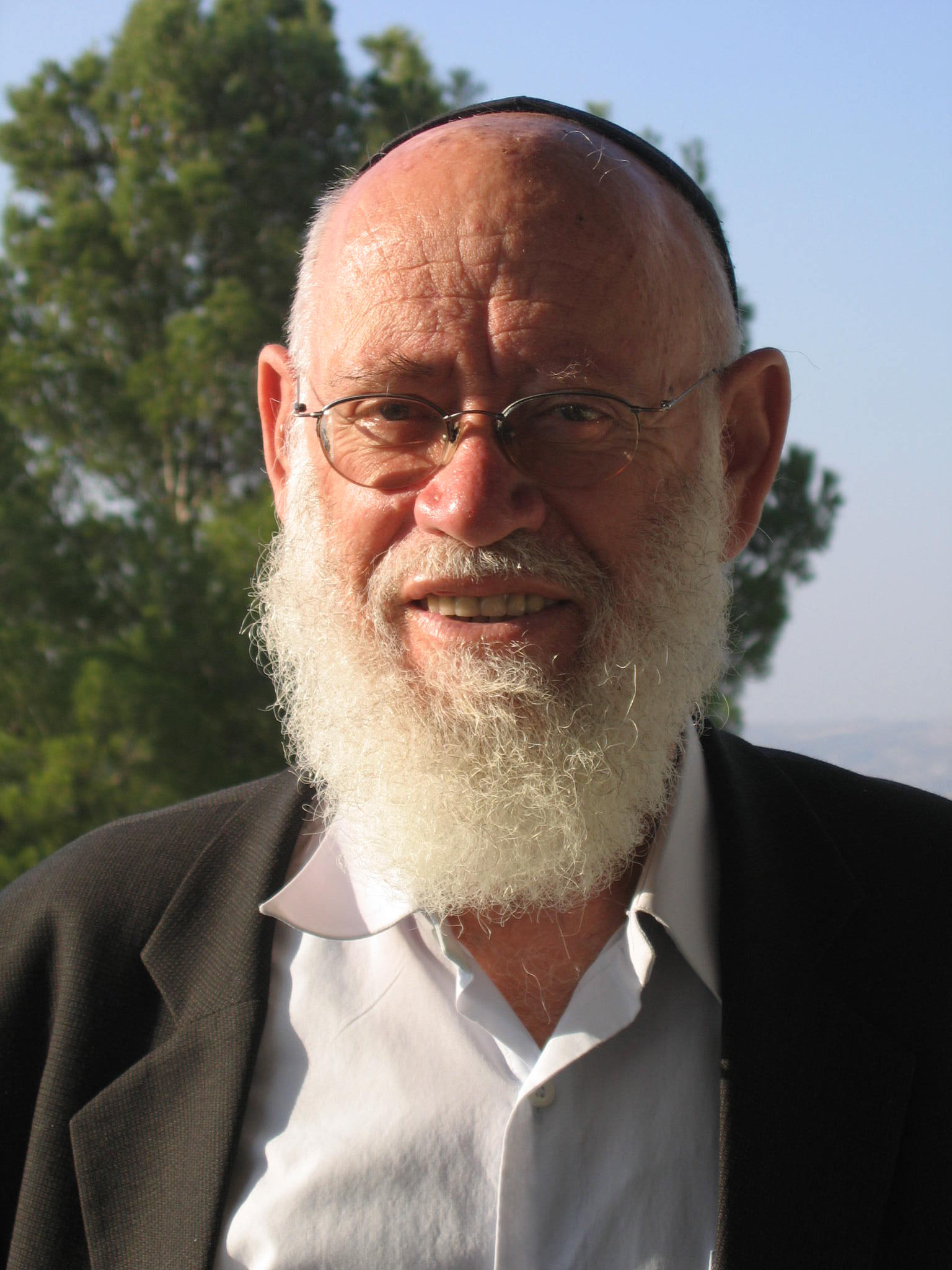
- Rabbi Moshe Levinger, 2005

Personal life
- Born: 1935 Jerusalem
- Died: May 16, 2015 (aged 79–80) Shaare Zedek Medical Center, Jerusalem
- Spouse: Miriam Levinger
- Children: 11
- Known for: Leading Jewish settlement in Hebron
- Occupation: Rabbi, activist, criminal

Religious life
- Religion: Judaism
- Denomination: Orthodox
- Movement: Religious Zionism

Moshe Levinger (Hebrew: משה לוינגר; 1935 – May 16, 2015) was an Israeli Religious Zionist activist and an Orthodox Rabbi who, since 1967, had been a leading figure in the movement to settle Jews in the territories occupied by Israel during the 1967 Six-Day War. He is especially known for leading Jewish settlement in Hebron in 1968, and for being one of the principals of the now defunct settler movement Gush Emunim, founded in 1974, among whose ranks he assumed legendary status. Levinger was reportedly involved in violent acts against Palestinians.

== Early years ==
Levinger was born in Jerusalem in 1935, and studied at Kfar HaRoeh Yeshiva and the Mercaz HaRav yeshiva in Jerusalem under the guidance of Rabbi Zvi Yehuda Kook. In his own words, he learned "that the Land of Israel must be in the hands of the Jewish people - not just by having settlements, but that it's under Jewish sovereignty".

== Settlement movement ==
At the time of the 1967 war, Levinger was the rabbi of the Nehalim religious moshav near Petah Tikva. Together with the Movement for Greater Israel, he organized the resettlement by Jews of the Etzion Bloc evacuated in 1948 following the Kfar Etzion massacre. There was disagreement on whether to wait for government approval, with Levinger taking the position that settlement should go ahead regardless. In the event, the government approved a Nahal military outpost at the site and kept secret that it was not military at all. Levinger himself was not one of the settlers.

Levinger first came to Hebron in 1968 after the West Bank was occupied by Israel in the Six-Day War. He rented rooms in Al-Naher Al-Khaled Hotel (which belonged to the family of former Mayor of Hebron, Fahed Al-Qwasmeh) at Ein-Sarah, on the main street of Hebron, in order to hold a Passover Seder, and then refused to leave. In a deal with the Israeli government, he moved with his family and followers to a former army base on a hill just northeast of Hebron, where, with the state's cooperation, they established the settlement of Kiryat Arba.

In 1987, Hadashot asked a panel of twenty-two leading Israelis, from all parts of the political spectrum, to name the "person of the generation, the man or woman who has had the greatest effect on Israeli society in the last twenty years". First place in this poll was shared by Menachem Begin and Levinger.

In 1992, Levinger created a political party called "Torah VeEretz Yisrael" (Torah and Land of Israel) for the Knesset elections that year, but did not receive enough votes to pass the electoral threshold. Levinger has a wife, 11 children, and 50 grandchildren, most of whom live in the West Bank. His wife Miriam and several of his children are also known as activists.

== Criminal charges ==
Levinger was arrested and charged at least 10 times, starting in 1975, in relation to incidents in Hebron or Kiryat Arba.

In 1984, Rabbi Levinger was arrested on suspicion of involvement with the Gush Emunim Underground. In July 1985, Levinger was fined approximately $15,000 and given a three-month suspended sentence for trespassing in the house of a Hebron woman and attacking her six-year-old son. Levinger told the Jerusalem Magistrate Court that the boy had thrown a stone at his son.

In 1988, Levinger was indicted on two separate criminal charges involving events in Hebron. On September 30, 1988, Levinger, who had been hit a week before by a rock, was attacked by stoners who smashed his windshield, injuring his son. He reached an Israeli checkpoint. Levinger pulled out his pistol, turned round, and went back down the streets shooting at shop windows, killing Palestinian store owner Hassan Abdul Azis Salah. A customer was also wounded. Levinger claimed he had been surrounded by Palestinians who threatened his life, and only to have shot into the air to defend himself against stone throwers. In a press conference following the shooting, Levinger said, "Regarding the actual deed, I will respond when the time comes. I have already said that as far as the substance of the case goes, the State Attorney's Office knows that I am innocent, and that I did not have the privilege of killing that Arab. Not that I may not have wanted to kill him or that he did not deserve to die, but I did not have the privilege of killing that Arab." He was charged with "manslaughter, causing bodily harm in aggravated circumstances, and intentionally damaging property". During one court appearance, Levinger approached the court waving his gun over his head and saying he had been "privileged" to have shot an Arab. After he was sentenced, he was carried off to jail on the shoulders of a cheering throng. His trial began in August 1989, despite protests by 13 right-wing Knesset members and hundreds of supporters. Levinger pleaded not guilty to the charges, but accepted a plea-bargain to the lesser charge of negligent homicide. He was sentenced to 5 months imprisonment and 7 months suspended, of which he served 92 days. During his imprisonment, he was given leave to attend a public event in Hebron. On his release in August 1990, he told Israel Radio, "If I'm in a situation of danger again, I'll again open fire. I hope that next time, I will be more careful, and I won't miss the target."

In another case, which related to an event five months before the first, he was alleged to have assaulted a Palestinian woman and her two children after other Arab children had "made fun of" his daughter. At his trial in May 1989, the magistrate dismissed the evidence of the Arab witnesses on the grounds that they were interested parties and wanted to see Levinger in prison for ideological reasons, and also dismissed the evidence of two IDF soldiers who testified to the assault. Six weeks after Levinger's release from prison on his separate negligent homicide conviction (see above), the Jerusalem District Court overturned his acquittal on the earlier assault charges. He was sentenced to 4 months imprisonment, plus an additional 10 days for an outburst in court. He served about two months. On his release in March 1991, he said "Over the years, I've carried out dozens of actions, and all of them were against the law. It was worthwhile to violate the law, as all these actions advanced the whole Land of Israel."

In July 1995, Levinger was sentenced to seven months imprisonment for a violent altercation in the Tomb of the Patriarchs in September 1991. The court found that Levinger had pulled down the partition separating Jewish and Muslim worshippers and assaulted an IDF officer. He served four months in prison in 1996.

In December 1995, Levinger was sentenced to six months in prison and six months suspended for an incident in June 1991. He was found guilty of rioting in the Hebron market, of overturning stalls, forcing other merchants to close their shops, and of firing his pistol. His defense was that he was attacked by Palestinians throwing rocks.

In December 1997, Levinger was sentenced to six months jail and fined $2,300 for disturbing Muslim prayers at Hebron's Tomb of the Patriarchs in 1994, and of blocking an army commander from entering Kiryat Arba.

== Later years ==
Since 2000, Levinger's health had been declining, and he was no longer a visible figure in the settlement movement. In 2007, Levinger fell victim to a major stroke as well as a broken hip. He died on 16 May 2015 at the Shaare Zedek Medical Center in Jerusalem. Levinger was survived by his wife Miriam, 11 children, and numerous grandchildren. On Sunday, May 17, 2015, he was buried in the Ancient Cemetery in Hebron.

In a condolence letter sent to the family, Prime Minister Benjamin Netanyahu described Rabbi Levinger as “an outstanding example of a generation that sought to realize the Zionist dream, in deed and in spirit, after the Six-Day War.”

== See also ==
- Gush Emunim Underground
