= Etzion =

Etzion (Hebrew: עציון, lit. of the tree), also spelled Ezion, can refer to places and topics relating to modern, ancient Israel and the West Bank:

- Ezion-Geber, a biblical Idumaean and Israelite port on the Red Sea
- Kfar Etzion, a kibbutz established in the early 20th century south of Jerusalem
- Gush Etzion, an eponymous bloc surrounding the kibbutz
- Gush Etzion Regional Council, a modern local government in that area
- Kfar Etzion massacre, a Jordanian massacre of kibbutz members
- Nir Etzion, a moshav established by survivors of the massacre
- Har Etzion, a yeshiva founded during the bloc's reestablishment
- Etzion Airbase, a former Israeli AFB in the Sinai Peninsula near the Red Sea (currently Taba International Airport)
- Etzion, the codename for the Israeli Air Force base in Žatec, Czechoslovakia, in the 1948 Arab–Israeli War
- Yehuda Etzion, an Israeli activist and member of the Jewish Underground
- Yeshiva Etzion, a yeshiva located in Queens, NY, established in 2003 by Rabbi Avraham Gaon
- Yeshivat Or Etzion, a Hesder Yeshiva, religious high school, and religious army preparation high school
- Gush Etzion Convoy, one of many convoys sent by the Haganah to the four blockaded kibbutz im of Gush Etzion
- Gush Etzion Junction ("Tzomet HaGush") also known as Gush Junction
