= Jewish Underground =

Israeli Jewish right-wing militant group

- המחתרת היהודית
- Founders: Menachem Livni; Yehoshua Ben-Shoshan; Yehuda Etzion
- Founded: 1979
- Dates active: 1979—1984
- Ideology: Jewish fundamentalism Anti-Arabism
- Political position: Far-right
- Status: Inactive

The Jewish Underground (Hebrew: המחתרת היהודית HaMakhteret HaYehudit), or in abbreviated form, simply Makhteret, was a radical right-wing fundamentalist organization considered terrorist by Israel, formed by prominent members of the Israeli political movement Gush Emunim that existed from 1979 to 1984. Two issues catalyzed the establishment of the underground. One was the signing of the Camp David Accords, which led to the Egypt–Israel peace treaty in 1979, and which the movement, opposed to the peace process, wished to block, viewing it as the first step in the establishment of a Palestinian state in the West Bank. A second element was the settlement project, which, in bringing two distinct ethnic communities into closer proximity, led to an uptick in hostilities that brought about a growing emphasis on the existential threat in both communities. The Jewish Underground developed two operational objectives: One consisted of a plot to blow up the Dome of the Rock, while the other branch concentrated on both avenging acts of Palestinian violence against settlers and of establishing a punitive deterrence. Some understood the terrorist acts as a means of inducing Palestinians to flee their homeland, based on the 1948 and 1967 experience, and parallels are drawn to the Terror Against Terror movement, which had a similar aim. Robert Friedman stated that the Makhteret was "the most violent anti-Arab terrorist organization since the birth of Israel".

Members of the Jewish Underground were eventually rounded up and brought to trial on charges that included violating the 1948 Prevention of Terrorism Decree. The charge of membership in a terrorist organization was dropped against 10 out of the 27 in a plea bargain. Most served short terms, and the ringleaders were pardoned and released in 1990.

== History ==
The Jewish Underground was an activist vigilante group formed in the early 1980s out of militants in the Gush Emunim movement, and consisted at its height of 25-27 militants, the majority holding key positions in Gush Emunim and settler organizations. Three men created the cell, Menachem Livni, Yehoshua Ben-Shoshan, and Yehuda Etzion, and were soon joined by Yitzhak Ganiram ("Akale"), Shaul Nir, his brother Barak Nir, and Uzi(ahu) Shar(a)baf (Sharback), rabbi Moshe Levinger's son-in-law. Menachem Livni, an engineering graduate of the Haifa Technion and commander of a reserve battalion of combat engineers, had moved to the Jewish settlement in Hebron in 1970, and in 1977, he had been elected chairman of the Kiryat Arba Council. Yehuda Etzion, a co-founder of the Ofra settlement, had been student of two rabbis, Zvi Yehuda Kook and Yehuda Amital, but was deeply influenced by the writings of Shabtai Ben-Dov, and was dedicated to organizing the destruction of the Dome of the Rock, whilst Livni, a student of Moshe Levinger from Kiryat Arba, was opposed to an attack on the Temple Mount and was primarily concerned with mounting actions against Arabs in the Palestinian territories.

The group that crystallized around them as an activist vigilante group adopted the symbol of the Stern Gang as their emblem. The main function of their attacks on Arabs was revenge, and the attacks were designed to inspire fear in Arabs. American Jews spearheaded fund-raising for the group’s underground activities, justifying their backing of such terrorism in terms of personal friendships. The organization also had assistance from two senior figures in the Military Administration that oversees the occupied territories, together with help from several reserve officers, and one career officer. Their activities ranged from placing incendiary bombs in vehicles owned by members of the Palestinian National Guidance Committee, an assault on Palestinian students at a college in Hebron, and an operation that nearly succeeded in blowing up the Dome of the Rock on the Temple Mount. An attempt to booby-trap a bus that transported Palestinian workers in East Jerusalem was discovered by the Shin Bet in 1984, and the exposure of the Jerusalem bus bombing operation led to a crackdown and trials which effectively ended the group's operations. The idea also circulated that acts of terror against Palestinians would hasten their exit from their homeland. The movement rejected the democratic foundations of Israel.

== Operations ==
=== Car-bombings of the mayors ===
Menachem Livni built many of the bombs used in the attacks. On June 2, 1980, the group carried out a series of terror attacks, including car bomb attacks against Palestinian officials. As a result of these attacks, two senior Palestinian figures were maimed for life: Bassam Shakaa, the mayor of Nablus, lost both of his legs, and Karim Khalaf, the mayor of Ramallah, lost one of his legs. A third victim targeted, El Bireh mayor Ibrahim Tawil, was saved when the device planted in his car was discovered. Spokesmen for Gush Emunim were variously reported as reacting with comments like, "Well organized, very good work", and, "I hope that the Jews did it". On hearing the news, co-founder of Gush Emunim rabbi Haim Drukman is said to have exclaimed, citing the Song of Deborah, "Thus, may all Israel's enemies perish!"

=== Attack on students at the Islamic College in Hebron ===
In retaliation for the murder of Aharon Gross, a student in a Hebron satellite yeshivah of Mercaz HaRav Kook, in an operation planned by Livni, three operatives of the group, Shaul Nir, Barak Nir, and Uzi Sharbaf, wearing ski masks, launched an attack on the Islamic College in Hebron on July 26, 1983. On arriving at the target, off a crowded Hebron street, Nir fired two bursts from his Kalashnikov in the air to signal that the area was clear. Uzi Sharbaf drove up to join him in a Peugeot 504 which stopped in front of the college. Both then entered the courtyard and fired into the students. Barak Nir, Shaul's brother, stood by the car and sprayed shots at students on the second floor who had been drawn to the windows to find out what the tumult was about. His brother Shaul and Sharbaf then entered the college, and tossed a grenade into a corridor where a student council had been convened. They then withdrew, burnt the evidence, and hid out at Gariam's home in the Golan Heights.

Three people were killed—Saad Adin Hassan Sabri, Jamal Saad El Adin Nayal and Samir Fatih Daoud, each 30 years old—and 33 wounded. Israel's President and Deputy Foreign Minister condemned the attack. Israeli authorities immediately began a manhunt and also imposed a curfew to prevent Palestinian demonstrations in response. Soldiers fired tear gas and warning shots to disperse Hebron residents who had gathered at the hospital where the wounded were being treated.

Israeli President Chaim Herzog commuted the sentences of the attackers in 1988 as part of the commemoration of the 40th anniversary of Israel's founding. They were released in 1990.

=== Plot to blow up the Dome of the Rock ===
The purpose of obliterating the Muslim shrine on the Temple Mount, considered together with the Al-Aqsa Mosque to be an "abomination", was to "awaken" Jews, and lay the groundwork for the creation of the Third Temple. The Jewish underground had two different ideas about how to destroy the Dome of the Rock. One proposal was to crash a plane packed with explosives into the building. One member of the group was an IDF expert in explosives who had access to sufficient ammunition and material stolen from the Israeli army to carry out the plan.

=== Jerusalem bus bombing plot ===
Early in the morning of 27 April 1984, following a plan devised by Livni, three operatives went into East Jerusalem and fixed five powerful explosive devices to the bottoms of five Arab buses. The bombs were timed to explode that afternoon, during Friday, one of the busiest days of the week, when the buses would have been packed with Palestinian worshippers returned home from celebrating Isra and Mi'raj. The Shin Bet arrested them at 4:30, just after they had completed the installation of the bombs.

== Arrests and trial ==
It was only during the interrogations that followed that Israeli Security officers stumbled onto evidence that the cell intended to blow up the Dome of the Rock, a mission which, many observed, had it been achieved, would have risked, a catastrophe of major proportions, if not a world conflagration. A week later, security forces raided the settlement of Kiryat Arba, finding a cache of stolen regional defense program weapons and explosives linked to the bomb plot.

On 27 April 1984, Shin Bet agents arrested 25 people, predominantly settlers in the West Bank and the Golan Heights. The arrests followed an extensive two-year investigation led by the head of the Serious Crimes Division and employing ninety policemen. One reason given to explain why, as opposed to the rapid results in tracking down and arresting Palestinian militants, the Jewish suspects had managed to remain operative and undetected for 5 years, was that, with Palestinian cases, Israel applies the British Mandatory Emergency Defense Regulations code of 1945, whereas the Shin Bet is required to observe the Israeli criminal code procedures with Jewish suspects, procedures which do not foresee administrative detention, placing arrested suspects in isolation for 2 weeks, demolishing homes and other forms of pressure to obtain breakthroughs.

A string of arrests followed with police bringing in a number of settlement and political leaders, including future Knesset member Eliezer Waldman and Rabbi Moshe Levinger. Twenty-five of the arrested Gush Emunim members were tried on a host of charges relating to the plot to destroy the Dome of the Rock, the 1983 attack on the Islamic College, the attempted assassination of West Bank mayors, the aborted bus attacks, and a few other incidents. Three of the men, Menachem Livni, Shaul Nir, and Uzi Sharbav, were sentenced to life in prison for their roles in the Islamic College attack and attempted assassinations.

Nur Masalha claims that several of the suspects were "pampered" during their trial. Politicians from the Likud, Morasha, and Tehiya parties visited the suspects in prison to express solidarity. An "impressive group of prominent rabbis" formed a group to lobby on their behalf. Yigal Cohen-Orgad and Rehavam Ze'evi offered references testifying to the good character of the accused, while other MKs like Meir Cohen-Avidov and Dov Shilansky were supportive from the very outset. Yuval Ne'eman argued that they had acted purely out of self-defense. A bill to grant them an amnesty was presented to the Knesset by religious parties. In a public opinion poll conducted by Haaretz in mid-1985, according to Nur Masalha's reading, 52.6% of Israelis polled were in favour of the prisoners' immediate release without trial. Edward Alexander, however, reports that a Haaretz poll in June found that 60% of Israelis condemned the Underground's activities, and the culprits deserved severe punishment. 14% of interviewees are said to have approved of the group, while 17.5% said some specific acts were justified.

The presiding judge at their trial, Shmuel Finkelstein, cited extenuating circumstances by contrasted what he regarded as premeditated Palestinian terrorism to the retaliatory acts of the Underground activists:

This group of men ... is unique. Most, if not all of them, have both yeshiva training and academic education. Most have served in the IDF (Israel Defense Forces) and have taken part in Israel’s wars ... Most are men of Torah and labor, who left behind an easy of life and went with their families to establish, develop, and protect Jewish settlements... The crimes of some of the defendants lay in the fervour of their religious faith; like the rebels under Korach, each picked up his pan of incense and loaded it with idolatrous fire against God’s command. The transgressions of people like these are not like the crimes committed by others who aimed to destroy, kill, annihilate.

Judge Yaakov Bazak, whose office displayed a portrait of Zvi Yehuda Kook, sympathized with the despair of Hebron settlers at government inaction to clamp down on terrorism, and said that the target of the terror, the Islamic College, taught, "with great fanaticism, hatred of Jews". During a trial recess, as a result of a successful negotiation to exchange prisoners, finalized in the Jibril Agreement, among the 1,100 Arab prisoners released were the killers convicted of the Beit Hadassah murders, and the murderer of Aharon Gross. This affected the sentencing: Major Rehavam Ze'evi placed blame on the government, and stated that despair had led the terrorists, "pioneers, men of vision and faith", to take the law into their own hands. Ben-Zion was released in 1989. Shaul Nir, Menachem Livni, and Uzi Sharbaf received life sentences (24 years), while the others received terms of imprisonment ranging from 3 to 9 years. 20 members were released after less than 2 years, in September 1986. The three life sentences were controversially commuted three times by then-President Chaim Herzog, finally to 10 years, and with time off for good behavior, they were released on December 27, 1990, and hailed as "heroes" by leaders of the Gush Emunim movement. Major Rehavam Ze'evi was killed by a Palestinian terrorist in 2001, while Shaul Nir was shot and critically wounded in a drive-by attack on 9 December 2015.

The Jewish Underground caused a rift in Gush Emunim. The existence of a violent underground had, until the mass arrests, been dismissed by most Gush Emunim members as falsehood circulated by Peace Now to discredit the movement. Reports from the terrorists' release suggest tremendous support for them by their fellow settlers. However, the majority of Israelis condemned the Underground's unprovoked killing of innocent civilians and contempt for secular law.

== Aftermath ==
Yehuda Etzion has since been active in pressing for the construction of the Third Temple in place of the Dome of the Rock on the Temple Mount. Though said to be not exactly repentant for his own past, he did make a public protest over the Duma arson attack, in which all but one member of a Palestinian family died when their home was fire-bombed by settlers. At the same time, he expressed sympathy for the motives governing the arsonists.

Livni was convicted on a charge of reckless endangerment for shooting at a Palestinian truckdriver in 2003, and sued by the victim. An out-of-court settlement awarded the Palestinian 15,000 shekels in 2014. In the same year, 2003, he founded the Livni Winery and produces Cabernet Sauvignon in the West Bank settlement of Kiryat Arba. It was revealed in 2015 by Israeli investigative reporter Uri Blau that Menachem Livni has since received a monthly salary from the Brooklyn-based Hebron Fund, a practice of using U.S. tax deductible donations to support Jewish terrorists that is, according to Blau, verified in several other cases.

== See also ==
- Moshe Zar
