= Meir Cohen-Avidov =

Israeli politician

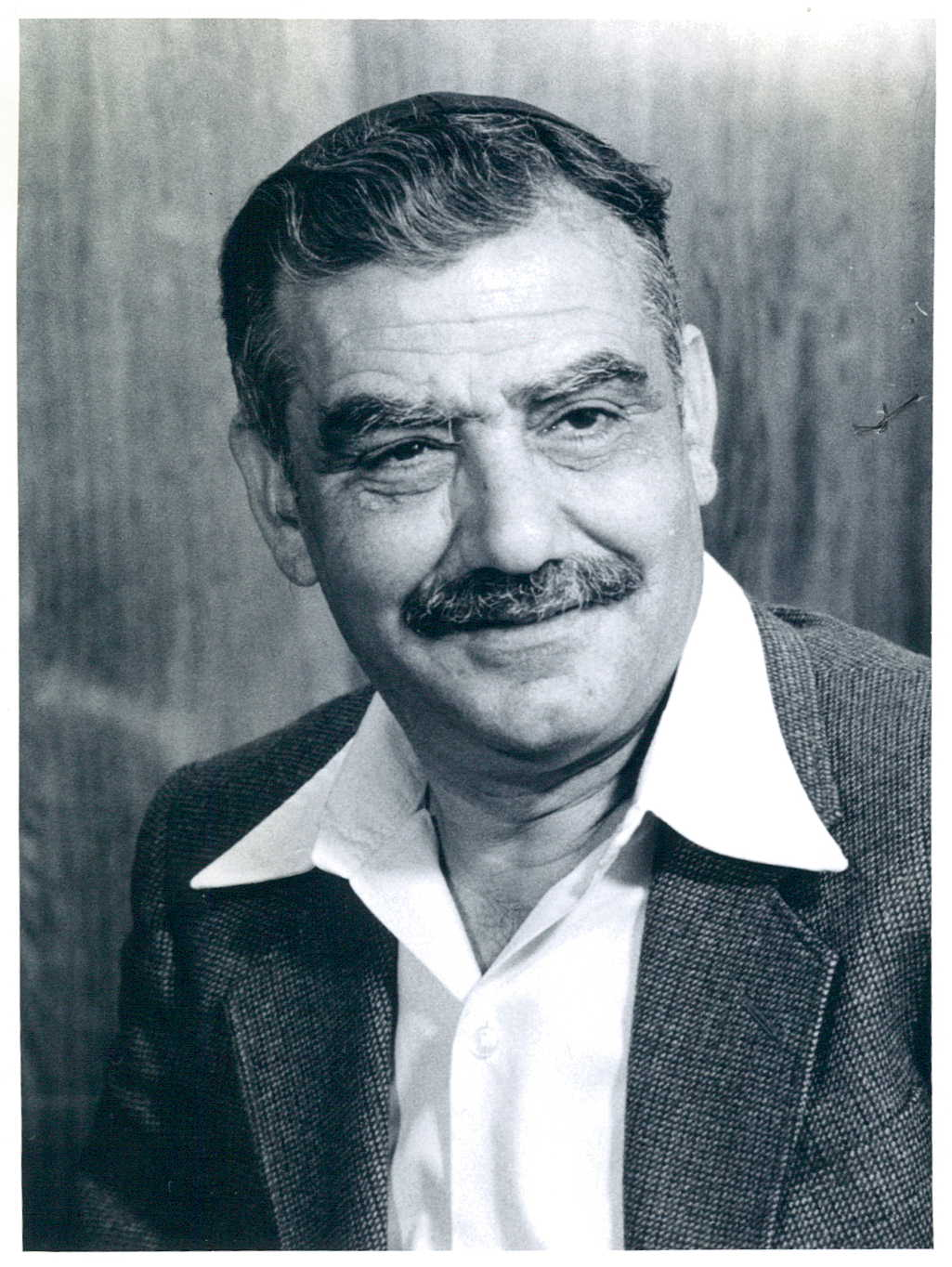
- Cohen-Avidov during his time in the Knesset

Faction represented in the Knesset
- 1974–1988: Likud

Personal details
- Born: 18 February 1926; Haifa, Mandatory Palestine
- Died: 4 March 2015 (aged 89)

Meir Cohen-Avidov (Hebrew: מאיר כהן-אבידב; 18 February 1926 – 4 March 2015) was an Israeli politician who served as a member of the Knesset for Likud between 1974 and 1988.

== Biography ==
Born in Haifa during the Mandate era, Cohen-Avidov studied at the School for Jurisprudence and Economics in Tel Aviv and was certified as a lawyer. He joined the Irgun in 1943 and began working for Haifa City Council in 1945. Between 1946 and 1948 he was imprisoned by the British Authorities. In 1961 he became the city council's comptroller, a role he held until 1966. Between 1969 and 1973 he was an elected member of the council.

A member of Herut's central committee and directorate, in 1973 he was elected to the Knesset on the Likud list, an alliance of Herut, the Liberal Party and several other small right-wing parties. He was re-elected in 1977, a year in which he became head of the Likud faction in the Histadrut trade union. He also chaired Likud's Haifa branch.

Cohen-Avidov was re-elected in 1981 and became a Deputy Speaker. In June 1983 he began a hunger strike in protest against Israelis who opposed the 1982 Lebanon War, saying that anti-war demonstrators were "using the blood of fallen soldiers for political purposes." One of Cohen-Avidov's brothers and one of his sons had been killed in the war. In December 1983 he was involved in a controversy after telling another of his sons, then serving in the Israel Defense Forces in the West Bank, to ignore IDF rules of engagement limiting gunfire against Palestinians who threw stones at the IDF. In February 1984 he introduced a bill to the Knesset to lower the marriageable age in Israel from 17 to 16.

After being re-elected in 1984 he remained a Deputy Speaker. In March 1986 he broke the cabinet whip to vote in favour of a bill proposed by Tehiya MK Geulah Cohen to annex the Occupied Palestinian territories. The bill failed to pass the Knesset. He lost his seat in the 1988 elections.

Cohen-Avidov died in March 2015 at the age of 89.

== Political views and opinions ==
In May 1984 Cohen-Avidov gave a speech at a rally in support of the Jewish Underground where he stated that "I would poke out the eyes of Arab murderers and tear out their guts."

In 1986 he stated that unless Israel did "something fast we will have parity between Jews and Arabs in 30 years, and a bi-national state," in response to declining immigration rates, and called for "a year of Jewish fertility" to be officially declared, with subsidies given to Jewish women with at least three children.
