= Moshe Zar =

Israeli settler and convicted terrorist (1937–2025)

- Born: Moshe Zar; 27 January 1937; Jerusalem, Mandatory Palestine
- Died: 11 July 2025 (aged 88); Israel
- Occupations: Israeli settler and convicted terrorist

Moshe Zar (Hebrew: משה זר; 27 January 1937 – 11 July 2025) was an Israeli settler and convicted terrorist. A religious Zionist, he was a member of the terrorist organization "Jewish Underground", and was known for being a settler leader in the northern West Bank. He bought land from individual Palestinians from 1979 onwards.

== Biography ==
Zar was born on 27 January 1937 in Jerusalem to Sara and Binyamin, a descendent of Mashhadi Jews. He was a long-time friend of former Israeli Prime Minister Ariel Sharon. He was wounded in the 1956 Sinai Campaign, and lost his left eye as a result of his injuries. In 1983, he was attacked and stabbed by a group of Palestinians, but survived.

In 1984, he was convicted of membership in the terrorist organization the "Jewish Underground" of the early 1980s, and sentenced to three years in prison for his part in the assassination of Palestinian mayors, but only spent a few months in jail. His wife Yael is quoted by the Israeli newspaper Haaretz as having said at the time: "The underground is not a stage in the life of the Zar family, but a stage in the life of the nation."

After one of his eight children, his son Gilad, a security officer of the Shomron Regional Council, was murdered in an ambush on 29 May 2001, he vowed that he would establish six settlements in his son's memory, one for each Hebrew letter of his name. The settlement outpost Ramat Gilad was established in 2001, and the outpost Havat Gilad was established in 2002 and has been dismantled by the Israeli military forces several times, leading to violent clashes between settlers and security forces.

Zar died on 11 July 2025, at the age of 88. Zar was mourned by Israel's Minister of Finance, Bezalel Smotrich, who praised Zar as "One of the founding pillars of the settlement enterprise in Judea and Samaria".
