= Havat Gilad =

Israeli settlement in the West Bank

- Location within the Northern West Bank
- Coordinates: 32°11′47″N 35°10′49″E
- Country: Israel
- District: Judea and Samaria Area
- Council: Shomron
- Region: West Bank
- Affiliation: Jewish
- Founded: 2002
- Founder: Itai Zar

Havat Gilad (Hebrew: חַוַּת גִּלְעָד, lit. 'Gilad Farm') is an Israeli settlement in the West Bank. Located about 1km from the Israeli settlement of Kedumim, Havat Gilad was established as an unauthorized outpost in 2002, after which it was dismantled by official forces and rebuilt by settlers several times until it was granted legal status by the Israeli government in February 2018. The outpost was set up in 2002 in memory of Gilad Zar, son of Moshe Zar and security coordinator of the Shomron Regional Council, who was shot and killed in 2001.

The international community considers Israeli settlements in the West Bank illegal under international law, though the Israeli government disputes this.

== Land ownership ==
Havat Gilad, one of 90 settler outposts in the West Bank constructed without obtaining official authorisation from the Israeli government, is located on land allegedly privately owned by Moshe Zar, a religious Zionist and long-time friend of former Prime Minister Ariel Sharon. He has claimed to have been buying land in the West Bank from individual Palestinians since 1979. A number of Palestinians have taken him to court asserting that he falsified contracts. After his son Gilad was killed, he vowed that he would establish six settlements in his son′s memory, one for each Hebrew letter of his name. Attempts to rebuild, involving expansion of construction, after the outpost had been demolished in February 2011, were challenged by villagers from the Palestinian township of Jit, who claimed that the residents of the outpost were building on privately owned Palestinian land. The Israeli Civil Administration was reported to be examining the complaint, while stating that "most lands in the area are private Palestinian lands."

== History ==
=== Illegal outpost (2002–2018) ===
There have been a number violent incidents involving Havat Gilad settlers. On 16 October 2002, journalists covering a "quiet" evacuation at the outpost, were attacked by settlers, on 19 October 2002, a Shabbath, when the outpost was forcibly evacuated and all its buildings were razed by the Israel Defense Forces for the first time, about 1,000 settlers, trying to prevent the dismantling of the outpost, clashed with soldiers and police. During the two days of confrontations, 46 policemen, and dozens of male and female soldiers and settlers were lightly injured. Fifteen people were arrested, but were released a few days later. Some of the settlers were back at the outpost the next day and erected temporary structures which were dismantled a week later, but the settlers were back on the site after a few hours. In November, security forces decided to file charges against twelve of the protesters.

In 2004, police arrested one settler, after armed settlers from the outpost had opened fire on shepherds from a nearby Palestinian village.

In March 2009, five residents of the outpost were briefly arrested on suspicion of throwing stones at police, when security forces attempted to evacuate the site. In September of the same year, settlers and security forces clashed following an attempt by security forces to confiscate a truck which was supposedly used to illegally transport a mobile home to the site, leading to four arrests.

In October 2010, Havat Gilad settlers set fire to olive trees belonging to Palestinian farmers of the village of Farata.

On 28 February 2011, Civil Authority forces escorted by police officers arrived in the settlement to demolish several illegal structures. Violent clashes erupted when settlers threw rocks at police, who responded with tear gas, stun grenades, and rubber bullets, injuring 15 settlers. Eight settlers were arrested, five for carrying concealing weapons, one for stone-throwing, and two for cutting down Palestinian olive trees. The demolition of the outpost led to further protests and violence among Israeli rightists. Seventeen pro-settlement protesters, seven of whom minors, were charged with disturbing the peace, attacking police, and damaging police vehicles. A week after the demolition, the destroyed structures were being rebuilt, and the settlers were said to plan to build several new homes, in addition to the ones that were demolished, as an act of protest. However, the government pledged to demolish the new buildings by the end of the year.

On 5 February 2014, three residents of Havat Gilad Farm were arrested on suspicion of having burned two cars, and for spraying graffiti in the Palestinian village of Farata. In December, 2 residents, Yehuda Landsberg and Yehuda Savir, were sentenced to 30 months imprisonment for the incident.

On 30 January 2015, members of the Golani Brigade shot dead a Palestinian man whom they claimed was about to throw a fire bomb at the road leading to Havat Gilad.

=== Legalization (since 2018) ===
Until 4 February 2018, when it was granted legal status by the Israeli government, it had been considered an unauthorized outpost by the Israeli government and on a list of outposts that Israel promised the U.S. to dismantle. The outpost was dismantled several times, but settlers had returned and re-established it. On 4 February 2018, the Israeli Government authorized Havat Gilad as a result of which it would be connected to electricity and water, and would no longer be considered an outpost and would become a settlement within the Samaria Regional Council.

On 18 July 2026, a fire erupted in the village causing major destruction to the community's infrastructure, destroying over 30 buildings and forcing the evacuation of more than 100 families. Authorities are investigating the fire as suspected arson. On 24 July, a Palestinian killed two Israelis and wounded three others who were hiking in the area.

==== January 2018 attack ====
On 9 January 2018, a volunteer medic resident and Rabbi of Havat Gilad, Raziel Shevach, was shot by an unidentified assailant while driving his vehicle near his home on Route 60 in the West Bank. Magen-David Adom, responding to his emergency call, pronounced him dead after attempt to administer resuscitation failed. A manhunt for the perpetrators ensued with roadblocks put in the area. It was reported that a similar attack had occurred in the previous weeks but the gunner's weapon had jammed. This was the most recent of many incidents since late 2015, during which period 51 Israelis, 300 Palestinians, and 5 foreign nationals have been killed in a sequence of Palestinian and Israeli Arab attacks.

The Israel Defense Forces had sealed several villages in the area near Nablus. On the night of 18 January 2018, the IDF reported capturing the murderers of Rabbi Raziel Shevach, in a midnight raid on Jenin. At least one of the alleged murderers was also killed. The mastermind behind the drive-by shooting was killed in the village of Al-Yamun by special forces on 6 February 2018.

Responses

Hamas, while not claiming responsibility, stated that the attack was "the first practical response to remind the enemy’s leaders and those behind them (the United States) that what you feared is coming," according to The Times of Israel. Its military wing the Izz ad-Din al-Qassam Brigades also stated that "The West Bank will remain a knife in your body".

The Israeli Defense minister stated, in response to the killing, that the government would consider legalizing the outpost.

David M. Friedman, the United States Ambassador to Israel, tweeted that "an Israeli father of six was killed last night in cold blood by Palestinian terrorists. Hamas praises the killers and PA laws will provide them financial rewards".

== Tourism ==
Some residents of Havat Gilad have developed tourism resorts and activities open to guests from Israel, and incoming tourism from abroad. In February 2016, The New York Times journalist Steven Erlanger visited the village home of Elana and Yehuda Shimon for dinner, and to check out the pottery classes and spend the night at one of the local guest homes.

In July 2026, Havat Gilad hosted its highest profile foreign visitor to date, Dutch politician Geert Wilders.

== See also ==
- Ramat Gilad
