= Ramat Gilad =

Illegal outpost in the West Bank, Palestine

Ramat Gilad: רָמַת גִּלְעָד (Hebrew)
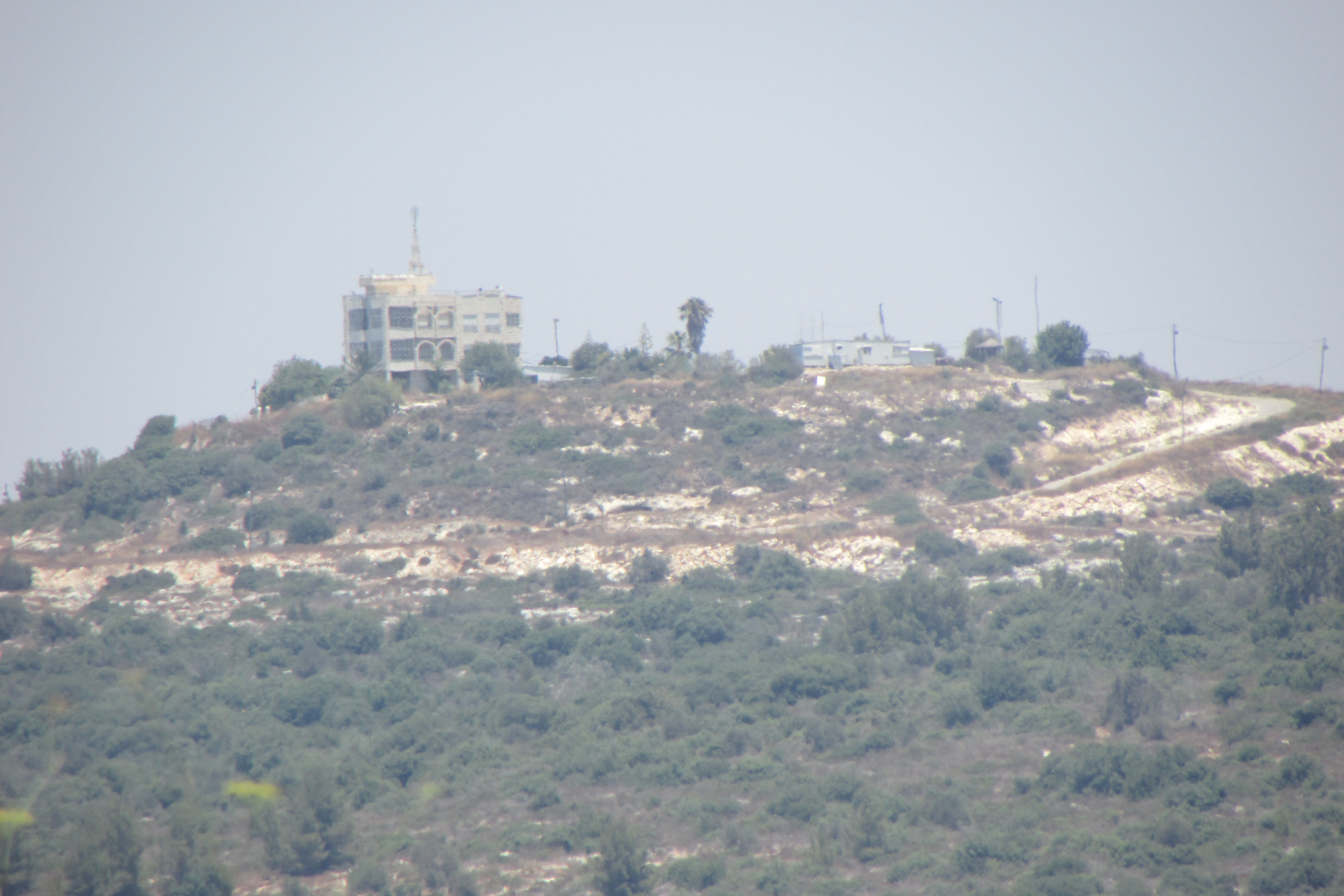
- Ramat Gilad as seen from Nofim in 2015

- Location within the Northern West Bank
- Coordinates: 32.181°N 35.113°E
- Country: Palestine
- District: Judea and Samaria Area
- Council: Shomron
- Region: West Bank
- Founded: May 2001
- Founder: Moshe Zar

Ramat Gilad (Hebrew: רָמַת גִּלְעָד, lit. 'Gilad Heights') is an Israeli outpost in the West Bank under the jurisdiction of Shomron Regional Council. Israeli outposts in the West Bank are considered illegal both under international law as well as under Israeli law.

== History ==
Ramat Gilad was established by Israeli settler and convicted terrorist Moshe Zar in 2001. Moshe created Ramat Gilad, as well as the nearby illegal settlement of Havat Gilad, to honor of his son Gilad Zar, a security coordinator of the Shomron Regional Council, who was shot and killed in 2001 by Palestinians during the Second Intifada. Since its founding, Havat Gilad was dismantled several times by the Israeli Defense Forces (IDF), leading to violence between settlers and the military.

By 2009, Ramat Gilad was home to 13 families. It was considered an unauthorized outpost by the Israeli government and slated for demolition.

In March 2011, the Cabinet of Israel ordered Ramat Gilad, along with all other illegal settlements in the West Bank, to be demolished by the end of the year. In response to this, the extremist settler group Hilltop Youth conducted a price-tag attack to defy the order. In the attack, rioters attacked an IDF base, soldiers, vehicles, and a Palestinian woman. Following the attack, a deal was reached between the government and settlers to remove nine homes located on privately owned Palestinian land. In exchange for the voluntary relocation, the Israeli government legalized the outpost as a neighborhood of the nearby Karnei Shomron. Peace Now stated that the deal proved to violent vigilantes that their methods were justified. The French government condemned this decision, stating that "all wildcat settlements must be demolished, as Israel promised in the 2003 roadmap".

In May 2014, the Israeli government demolished six of the settlements buildings and a synagogue, all built on private Palestinian land.

A large wildfire erupted between Ramat Gilad and Karnei Shomron in 2016. Land mines in Ramat Gilad exploded as a result of the fires.

In 2017, the Defense Ministry cleared mines from the area around Karnei Shomron. This was expected to allow for the construction of approximately 1,200 homes in Ramat Gilad.

In 2018, the Israeli government passed "Regulation Law 2" which legalized 66 illegal settlements in the West Bank, including Ramat Gilad.

Since the start of the Gaza war in 2023, about 45 Palestinian farmers have been unable to access 50 dunums of farmland in an area near Jinsafut. Israeli authorities have cited proximity of the farms to Ramat Gilad military outpost as the reason for denying access.

In 2024, Bezalel Smotrich instructed Israeli government ministries to fund further construction and development in 70 illegal outposts, including Ramat Gilad.

In January 2025, forty masked men attacked Palestinian villages near Ramat Gilad, setting fire to buildings and cars. The attacks led to an 86-year-old Palestinian man being hospitalized in Sinjil. The men clashed with IDF soldiers and Border Police, leading to two Israeli men being shot. The shooting led to a protest and riot in Jerusalem of far-right Israelis.

== See also ==
- Havat Gilad
- Israeli outpost
- Israeli settler violence
- Zionism as settler colonialism
