= David Samson (rabbi) =

Israeli Religious Zionist rabbi (born 1956)

Rabbi Dr. David Samson דוד סמסון

Personal life
- Born: January 1, 1956 Baltimore, Maryland
- Occupation: Rabbi, Writer, Educational Entrepreneur

Religious life
- Religion: Judaism

David Samson (Hebrew: דוד סמסון; born 1956) is an Orthodox rabbi and one of the leading English-speaking Torah scholars in the Religious Zionist movement in Israel, and an educational entrepreneur. Rabbi Samson has written six books, most of which are on the teachings of Rabbi Avraham Yitzchak Kook and Rabbi Zvi Yehuda Kook.

== Early life and education ==
Rabbi Samson was born in Baltimore, Maryland. His grandfather was Rabbi Chaim Eliezer Samson, who was the Rosh Yeshiva of the Talmudical Academy of Baltimore for over 50 years. After moving to Israel, he studied under the tutelage of Rabbi Zvi Yehuda Kook for twelve years. He served as a congregational rabbi of Kehillat Dati Leumi synagogue in Har Nof, Jerusalem. He taught Talmud and Jewish Studies at Yashlatz.

== Career ==
Rabbi David Samson is also the founder of Arutz Sheva English broadcasting and created his own radio talk show from now until midnight. He appeared on the weekly TV feature magazine "Israeli Salad" on Arutz Sheva broadcast. In 2003, he founded Atid, a non-profit organization for youth at risk. He then founded Maale Erev Institutions in 2004, a set of high schools for youth at risk, and Yeshivat Lech Lecha, a mobile high school based in jeeps. In recent years Rabbi Samson has opened up a number of schools. In 2008 he started Yerushalayim Torah Academy (Y.T.A), a Yeshiva High School for English speakers located in Jerusalem. It is designed especially for the immigrant community and offers a new and innovative program that has become the model for the Ministry of Education. Then he opened YTA for girls, a similar program for girls located in Bet Shemesh. In September 2011, he founded a third yeshiva high school for English speakers, this one located in Kfar Saba.

In 2014, he founded the Lone Star Language Academy, a network of language schools in Texas.

In 2020, Rabbi Samson Founded the King Solomon Academy, which is a program designed for Jewish middle and high school students who are interested in furthering their Jewish knowledge. Rabbi Samson Described the purpose of founding the King Solomon Academy as to create affordable Jewish education while creating an engaging digital experience.

He is presently the founder and dean of Atid institutions in Israel, and the founder and dean of the Lone Star Language Academy in Texas.

== Books by Rabbi Samson ==
- Samson, David; Tzvi Fishman (1991). Torat Eretz Yisrael. Jerusalem: Torat Eretz Yisrael Publications.
- Samson, David; Tzvi Fishman (1996). Lights Of Orot. Jerusalem: Torat Eretz Yisrael Publications. ISBN 965-90114-0-7.
- Samson, David; Tzvi Fishman (1997). War and Peace. Jerusalem: Torat Eretz Yisrael Publications. ISBN 965-90114-2-3.
- Samson, David; Tzvi Fishman (1999). The Art of T'Shuva. Jerusalem: Beit Orot Publications. ISBN 965-90114-3-1.
- Samson, David (November 2005). Tzvi Fishman (ed.). Ask the Rabbi. Arutz Sheva Publications. ISBN 965-90114-7-4.
- Samson, David (2021). Rabbi Shimon Apisdorf (ed.). Rosh Milin. An Educational Solutions Publication. ISBN 978-965-90114-7-6.
