= Gershon Shafat =

Israeli politician (1927–2020)

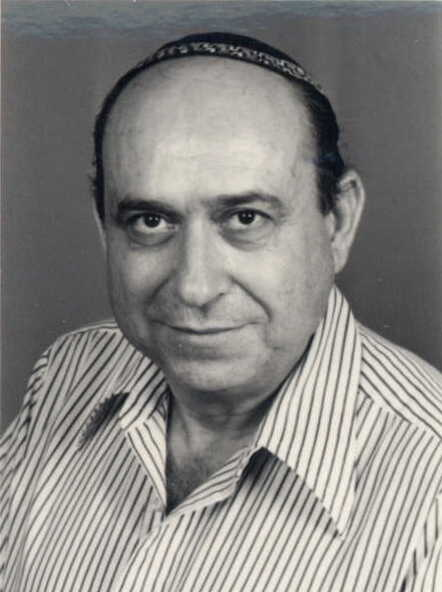
- Shafat during his time in the Knesset

Faction represented in the Knesset
- 1984–1992: Tehiya

Personal details
- Born: 6 December 1927 Vienna, Austria
- Died: 16 August 2020 (aged 92)

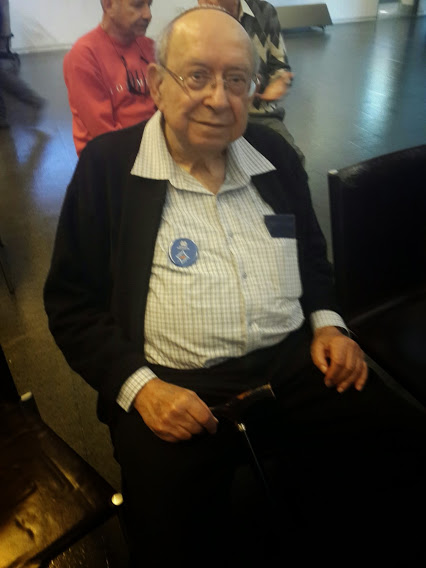
Shafat in 2014

Gershon Shafat (Hebrew: גרשון שפט; 6 December 1927 – 16 August 2020) was an Israeli politician who served in the Knesset for the ultra-nationalist Tehiya party during the mid-1980s and early 1990s. He advocated for the expansion of Israeli settlements in West Bank and was active in the Gush Emunim movement.

== Biography ==
Born Gershon Staub in Vienna, Austria in 1927, Shafat emigrated to Mandatory Palestine in 1934. He was educated at the Moria high school in Tel Aviv, and spent two years studying history and sociology at university.

He became a member of the Bnei Akiva youth movement, and later joined the National Religious Party. In 1946 he was amongst the founders of kibbutz Ein Tzurim. After the kibbutz was conquered by the Jordanian Army, he was a prisoner of war for ten months. When released, he was a member of the group that re-established Ein Tzurim in a new location.

From 1956 until 1958 he worked as the manager of the Purchasing Organisation, and as the Co-ordinator of the Religious Kibbutz Movement's political committee. Between 1961 and 1977 he managed a Tadmor factory.

Despite much of the international community consider Israeli settlements in West Bank to be illegal under international law, Shafat heavily promoted the expansion of Israeli settlements in the territory. In 1974 he became a member of the ultra-nationalist Gush Emunim settlement movement's secretariat, and held the post of political secretary between 1976 and 1979. He joined the new Tehiya party in 1979, and served as its secretary-general until 1985. Placed fifth on the party's list, he was elected to the Knesset in 1984, as Tehiya won five seats. Although he lost his seat in the 1988 elections, he returned to the Knesset on 31 January 1990 as a replacement for Yuval Ne'eman, who had resigned his seat. Shafat lost his seat again in the 1992 elections, in which Tehiya failed to cross the electoral threshold.

He died in August 2020.
