= Geulah Cohen =

Israeli politician and activist (1925–2019)

- גאולה כהן
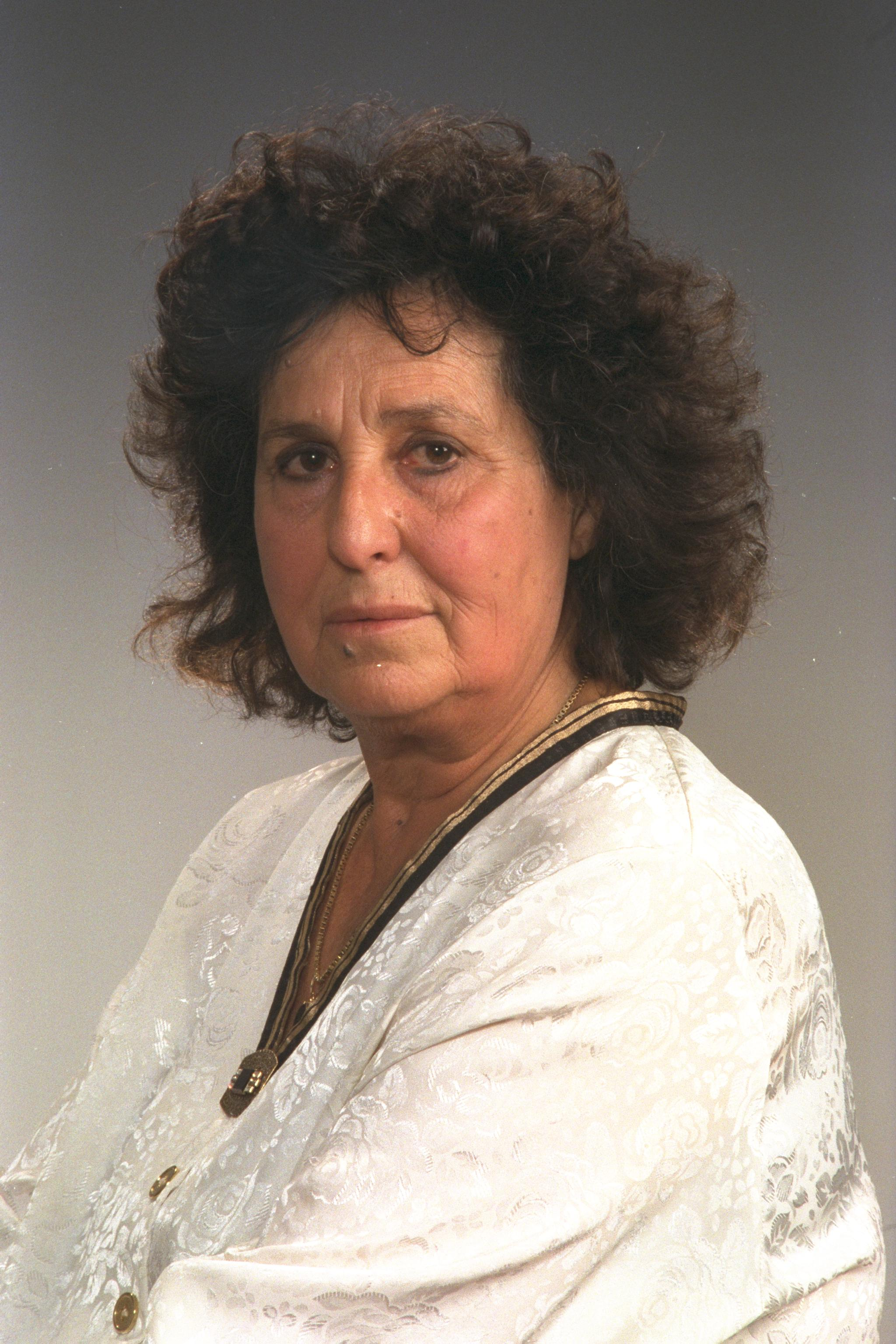

Faction represented in the Knesset
- 1974–1979: Likud
- 1979–1992: Tehiya

Personal details
- Born: 25 December 1925 Tel Aviv, Mandatory Palestine
- Died: 18 December 2019 (aged 93) Israel
- Awards: Israel Prize (2003); Yakir Yerushalayim (2007)
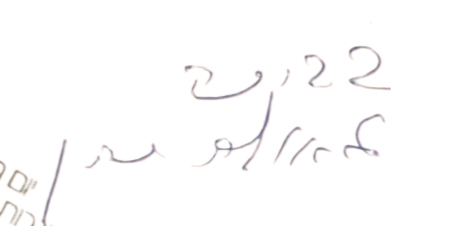
- Signature

Geulah Cohen (Hebrew: גאולה כהן; 25 December 1925 – 18 December 2019) was an Israeli politician, activist, and a former Lehi militant. She served in the Knesset from 1974 to 1992, first representing Likud, and then co-founding the nationalist Tehiya party in 1979. A recipient of the Israel Prize, Cohen was a prominent figure in right-wing Israeli politics until losing her parliamentary seat in 1992.

== Life and career ==
Geulah Cohen was born in Tel Aviv, Mandatory Palestine to a Mizrahi Jewish family of Yemenite, Moroccan and Turkish origin. She was the daughter of Miriam and Yosef Cohen. She studied at the Levinsky Teachers Seminary, and earned a master's degree in Jewish Studies, Philosophy, Literature and Bible at the Hebrew University of Jerusalem.

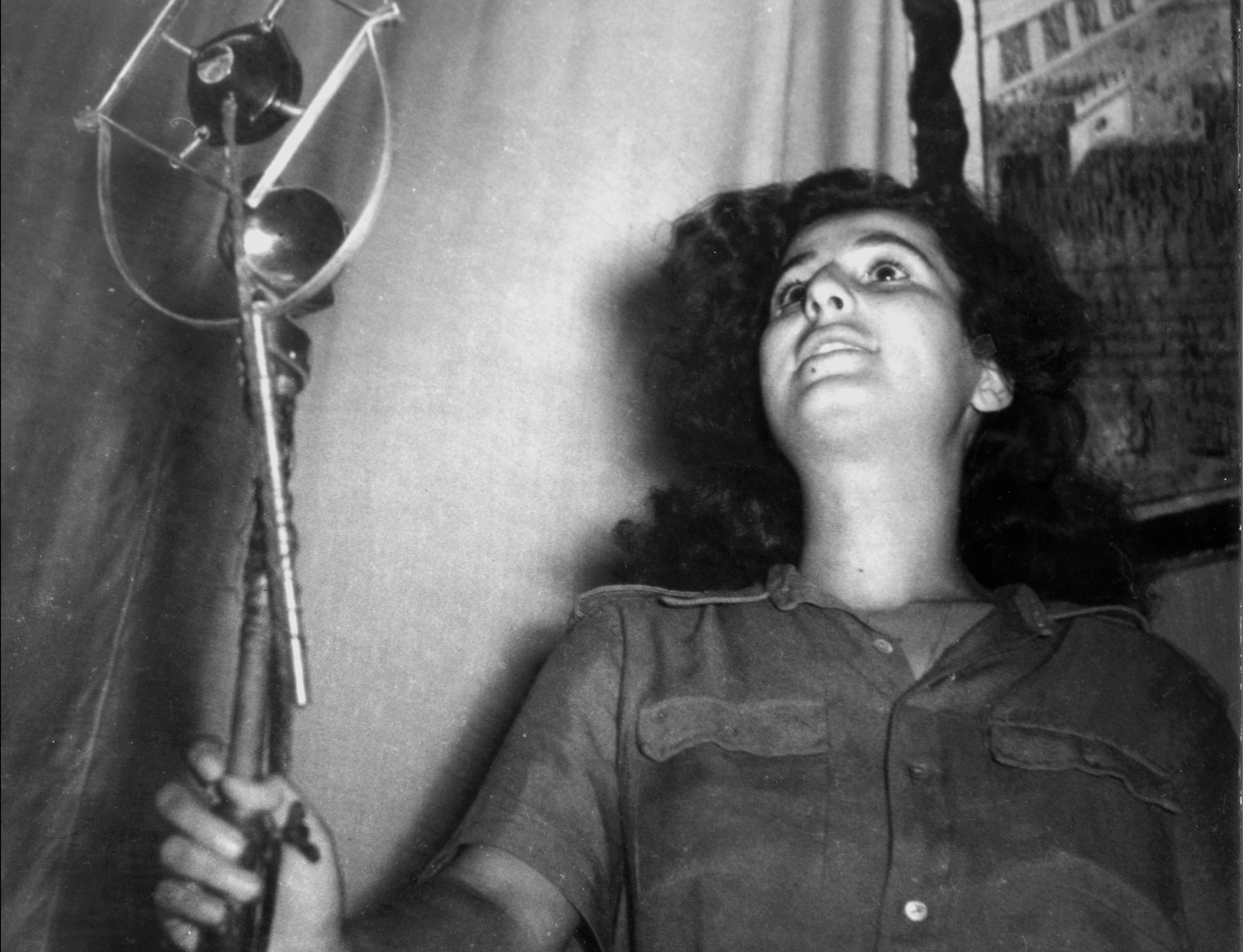
Cohen as a radio broadcaster for the Lehi underground station in 1948

In 1942 she joined the Irgun, and moved to Lehi the following year. As a radio announcer for the organization, she was arrested by British military authorities in 1946 while broadcasting in Tel Aviv. On 6 June 1946, she was sentenced to seven years in prison (the Encyclopaedia Judaica lists the sentence as 19 years) for possessing a wireless transmitter, pistols, revolvers, and ammunition. During sentencing she sang "Hatikvah" and was accompanied by 30 members of her family. Imprisoned in Bethlehem, she escaped in 1947.

Cohen was editor of the Lehi newspaper Youth Front. Following the Israeli Declaration of Independence in 1948, she contributed to Sulam, a monthly magazine published by former Lehi leader Israel Eldad.

Cohen was married to former Lehi comrade Emanuel Hanegbi. From 1961 to 1973, she wrote for the Israeli newspaper Maariv and served on its editorial board. During her career as a journalist, she visited Menachem Mendel Schneerson in New York, who encouraged her to focus on engaging with Israeli youth.

Cohen died on 18 December 2019, at the age of 93. She was buried at the Mount of Olives Jewish Cemetery in Jerusalem.

== Political career ==
In 1972, Cohen joined Menachem Begin's Herut party, which was then part of the Gahal alliance. She was elected to the Knesset the following year, by which time Gahal had merged into Likud. She was re-elected in 1977.

As an opponent of the Camp David Accords and the return of the Sinai Peninsula to Egypt, Cohen was thrown out of the Knesset during Begin's presentation of the agreement. In 1979, Cohen and Moshe Shamir left Likud to establish a new far-right party, initially called Banai, later Tehiya-Bnai, and then Tehiya. The new party was a strong supporter of Gush Emunim and included prominent members from Israeli settlements in the West Bank and Gaza such as Hanan Porat and Elyakim Haetzni.

Cohen retained her seat in the 1981 elections, and Tehiya joined Begin's coalition government. She was re-elected in 1984 and 1988. In June 1990, following a coalition crisis, she was appointed to the cabinet as Deputy Minister of Science and Technology.

Cohen lost her seat in the 1992 elections. That year, she rejoined Likud and remained active in right-wing politics. Her son, Tzachi Hanegbi, is a former Knesset member for the Likud.

== Political ideology and positions ==
Cohen opposed territorial concessions. She was a vocal critic of the Camp David Accords in 1978 and of Israel's unilateral disengagement plan from Gaza in 2005. She described herself as a "woman of violence" in the pursuit of political ends.

== Awards and recognition ==
- In 2003, Cohen was awarded the Israel Prize for her lifetime achievements and special contribution to society and the State of Israel.
- In 2007, she received the Yakir Yerushalayim (Worthy Citizen of Jerusalem) award from the city of Jerusalem.
- In 2014, Cohen was honored as one of the torchbearers in the national Israeli Independence Day ceremony.

== Published work ==
- Story of a Warrior (1961; Hebrew autobiography)
- Woman of Violence: Memoirs of a Young Terrorist, 1943–1948. Holt, Rinehart and Winston. 1966. (autobiography)
- Historical Meeting (1986) (Hebrew)
- Ein li koah lehiyot ayefa ("No Strength To Be Tired"; 2008)
