= Shabtai Ben-Dov =

Israeli philosopher and militant

Shabtai Ben-Dov (Hebrew: שבתי בן דב; 31 May 1924 – 29 December 1978) was a member of Lehi and a philosopher. His work has been influential on several right-wing Israeli messianic groups.

== Personal life ==
Ben-Dov was born in Vilnius, then part of Second Polish Republic in 1924 and moved to the British Mandate of Palestine in 1935. He joined the Irgun, which was fighting the British for control of the region. When Lehi split from Irgun, Ben-Dov joined the former to continue fighting the British, who he didn't think were doing enough to try and stop the Holocaust. He was caught, imprisoned, and eventually exiled to Africa by the British. He returned to Israel after the establishment of the State of Israel in 1948, and fought in the IDF's 89th battalion.

After the Six-Day War in which Israel captured the Temple Mount, but allowed the Jerusalem Islamic Waqf to control it, Ben-Dov sued the government. He demanded that the Temple Mount be controlled by those who would "protect it as a Jewish holy place".

== Philosophy ==
Ben-Dov believed in a theory of active redemption: that the Mashiach would only come through a bloody national conquest, and that Jews who believed non-violent means could bring about the end of days were naive. He thought that Israel should be a theocratic state instead of a democratic one in order to keep the people focused on the cause of conquest. The establishment of the Third Temple would speedily bring about a world government based on Jewish values governed by a Sanhedrin.

Although his philosophy did not catch on, he did win over Yehuda Etzion to whom he served as a mentor. Etzion later become a member of the Gush Emunim Underground and a revered figure in the Third Temple movement. Ben-Dov's philosophy was influential on the group Hai Vekayam, as well as many Gush Katif leaders. Etzion would later devote himself to publishing Ben-Dov's writings, of which several volumes have been published.

== Books ==
Ben-Dov is the author of:

- The Redemption of Israel in the Crisis of the State
- Prophecy and Tradition in Redemption
- After the Six Day War: From the Six Day Victory On
- The Yom Kippur War: Interim Summary – Assessments and Prospects
