= Eliezer Waldman =

Israeli politician and rabbi (1937–2021)

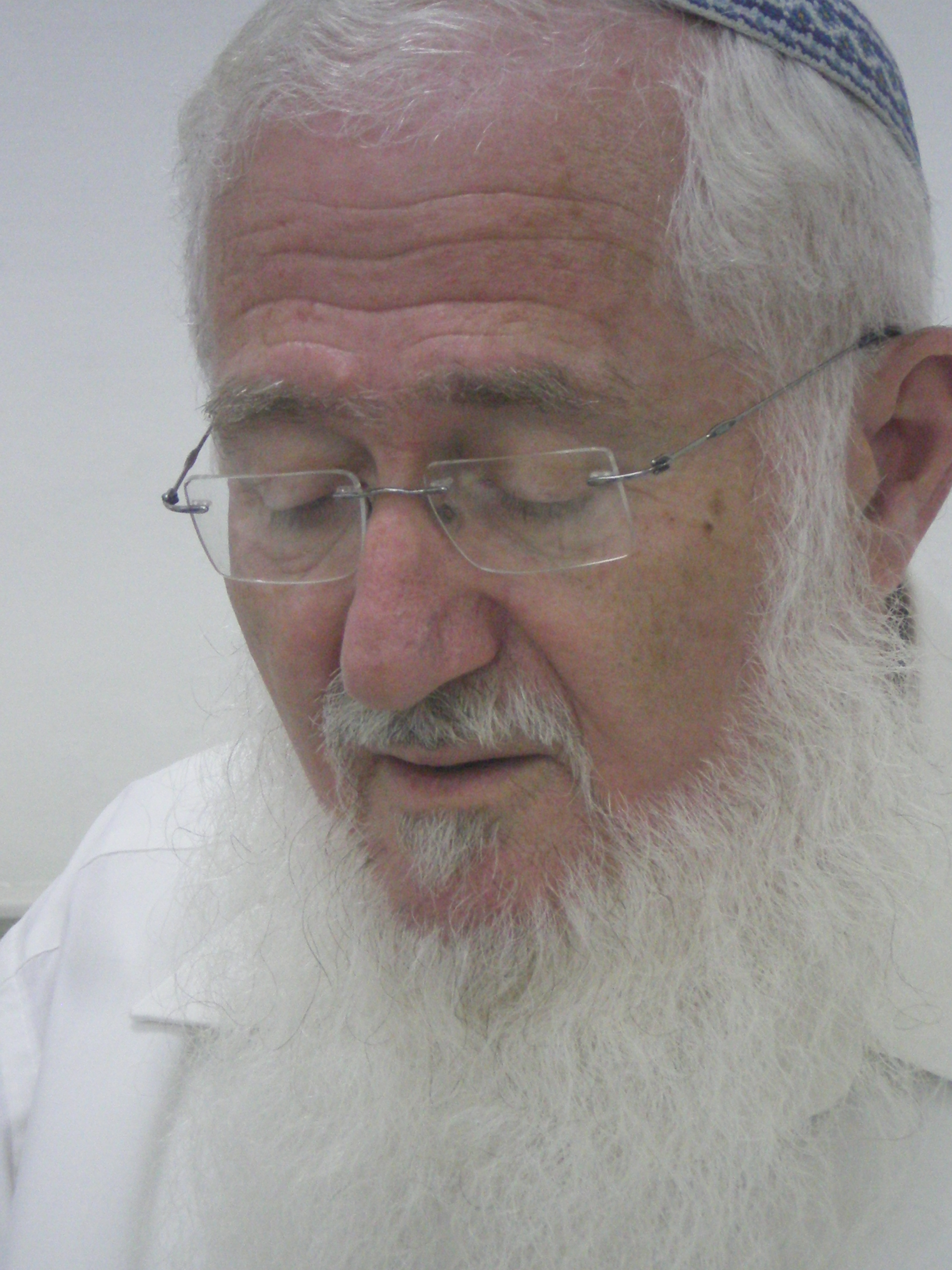
- Waldman in 2008

Faction represented in the Knesset
- 1984–1990: Tehiya

Personal details
- Born: 11 February 1937 Petah Tikva, Mandatory Palestine
- Died: 18 December 2021 (aged 84)

Eliezer Waldman (Hebrew: אליעזר ולדמן; 11 February 1937 – 18 December 2021) was an Israeli Orthodox rabbi and politician, who served as a member of the Knesset for Tehiya between 1984 and 1990. Rabbi Waldman was the co-founder and President of Yeshivat Nir Kiryat Arba.

== Biography ==
Waldman was born in Petah Tikva in 1937 during the Mandate period. At the age of three, his family emigrated to the United States. Waldman subsequently studied at Yeshivas Chaim Berlin, Yeshiva University and Brooklyn College. In 1956, he returned to Israel through the Bnei Akiva Hachshara program. After the one-year program, he was accepted into the Mercaz HaRav yeshiva, where he studied with Haim Drukman under Rabbi Zvi Yehuda Kook.

He was one of the leaders of the Jewish settlement in Hebron, and one of the founders of the Kiryat Arba settlement. He founded Yeshivat Nir in Kiryat Arba in 1972 alongside Yehoshua Rosen and Moshe Levinger, later becoming its president, with his son Noam as Rosh Yeshiva. According to Menachem Livni, in 1980 Waldman volunteered to take part in a Jewish Underground plot to carry out car bomb attacks against Palestinian officials.

Waldman was also among the founders of the Gush Emunim movement and the Tehiya party. In 1984, he was elected to the Knesset on the party's list. He was re-elected in 1988, but resigned from the Knesset on 31 January 1990, and was replaced by Elyakim Haetzni.

He died on 18 December 2021, at the age of 84.
