= Zvi Yehuda Kook =

Religious zionist leader (1891–1982)

Rabbi Zvi Yehuda Kook
- הָרָב צְבִי יְהוּדָה קוּק
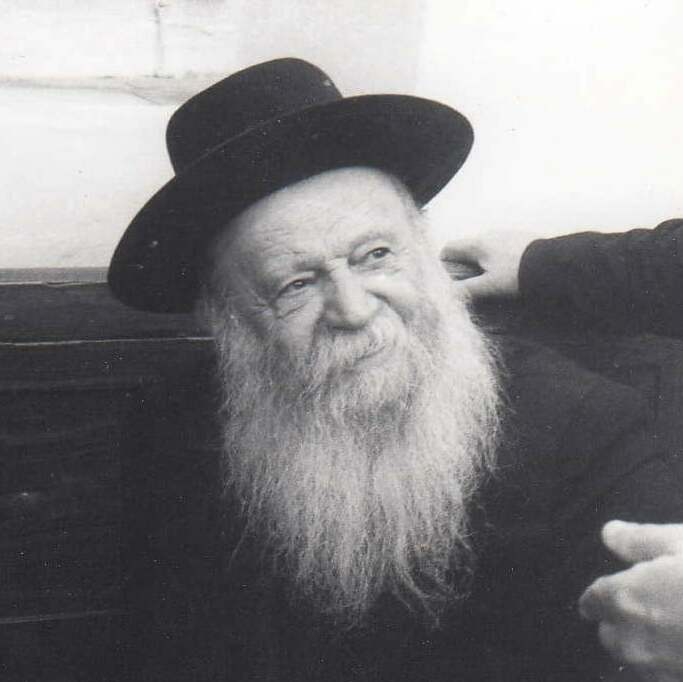

Personal life
- Born: 23 April 1891 Zaumel, Kovno Governorate, Russian Empire (now Žeimelis, Lithuania)
- Died: 9 March 1982 (aged 90) Jerusalem, Israel
- Buried: Mount of Olives Jewish Cemetery, Jerusalem
- Spouse: Chava Leah Hutner
- Parent(s): Abraham Isaac and Reiza Rivka Kook

Religious life
- Religion: Judaism
- Denomination: Orthodox

Jewish leader
- Position: Rosh yeshiva
- Yeshiva: Mercaz HaRav
- Began: 1952
- Ended: 1982

Zvi Yehuda Kook (Hebrew: צְבִי יְהוּדָה קוּק, 23 April 1891 – 9 March 1982) was an ultranationalist Orthodox rabbi. He was the son of Abraham Isaac Kook, the first Ashkenazi chief rabbi of British Mandatory Palestine. Both father and son are credited with developing Kookian Zionism, which became the dominant form of Religious Zionism. He was Rosh Yeshiva (dean) of the Mercaz HaRav yeshiva.

Kook's fundamentalist teachings were a significant factor in the formation and activities of the modern religious settlement movement in the Israeli-occupied West Bank and Gaza, largely through his influence on the Gush Emunim movement, which was founded by his students. Many of his ideological followers established such settlements, and he has been credited with the dissemination of his father's ideas, helping to form the basis of Religious Zionism.

Kook presided for nearly six decades over the Mercaz HaRav yeshiva (lit. 'The Rabbi's Centre') founded by his father in Jerusalem, which became "the flagship yeshiva of religious Zionism", where hundreds of future militants, opposed to territorial compromises and promoting Israeli settlement of the Occupied Palestinian Territories, received their formative education.

== Biography ==
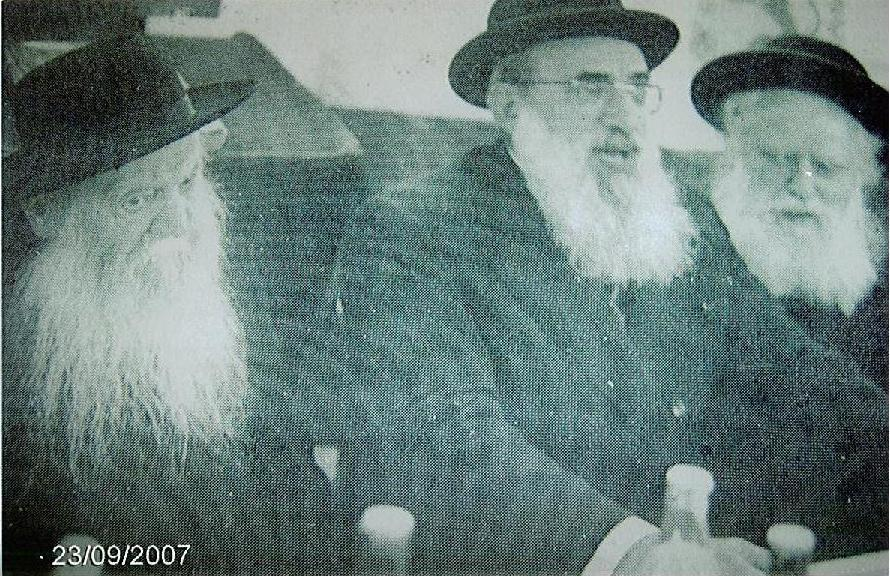
Kook (left) with rabbis Shlomo Goren (middle) and Abraham Shapira (right) at Mercaz HaRav, 1981

Zvi Yehuda Kook was born on the eve of Passover in 1891 in Zaumel in the Kovno Governorate of the Russian Empire (now Žeimelis in Northern Lithuania), where his father served as rabbi and was a prominent local Zionist. His mother was his father's second wife, Reiza Rivka, the niece of Eliyahu David Rabinowitz-Teomim, Chief Rabbi of Jerusalem together with Shmuel Salant. Kook was named after his maternal grandfather, Zvi Yehuda Rabinowitz-Teomim.

In 1896, his father, with his entire family, moved to Boisk, Latvia, where he ran a yeshiva and served as a parish rabbi. There Kook studied Talmud under the guidance of Rabbi Reuven Gotfreud, the son-in-law of Yoel Moshe Salomon, (Note: Salomon descended from a family that, inspired by the this-worldly messianism of the Vilna Gaon, had emigrated to Palestine in the early 19th century, and in the Old Yishuv, as distinct from the Perushim (separatist ascetics) following the Gaon's principles, Salomon's family constituted a religious clan notable for creating institutional infrastructure. It was this Salomon who had engineered the Kook family's aliyah in 1904, after convincing a committee to nominate the father Abraham to succeed the recently deceased rabbi of Jaffa (Mirsky 2014, pp. 40–41, 45).) one of the founders of Petah Tikva. Later, from 1899 onward, Kook was also tutored by Benjamin Menashe Levin, a guest of their family. (Note: Benjamin Menashe Levin (1879-1944) was a Talmudic studies prodigy (iluy) and later authored Otzar HaGeonim, a foundational study on Geonic halakha (Mirsky 2014, pp. 11, 33–34; Mirsky 2021).) His father, until his dying day, was to remain Kook's principal teacher, though at this time he hired a private tutor to teach his son Russian.

In 1904, at age 13, Kook moved to Jaffa, when his father was appointed Chief Rabbi of the city, then part of Ottoman-controlled Palestine. Like his father, he would celebrate each year the date of his aliyah (emigration to the Land of Israel) on the 28th day of Iyyar.

In 1906, Kook, by then 15, went to study at Torat Haim under its rosh yeshiva, Zerah Epstein. (Note: After making aliyah in 1886 Yitzhak Vinograd founded the Torat Haim Yeshiva in Jerusalem. Zerah Epstein had preceded him, arriving in Palestine in 1881, and subsequently headed the school (Shohet 2013, pp. 49–50).) Some years later he returned to his father's home in Jaffa, where he continued his studies. It was around this time that he developed a close relationship with Yaakov Moshe Harlap, with whom he studied Kabbalah. Harlap formed part of his father's close circle. In 1908, he began to edit his father's writings, a task he continued down to his death, as he considered himself the only person capable of authoritatively interpreting them. (Note: "the father's influence is imprinted in every bit of the son's writings." (Ben-Johanan 2022, p. 197)) It has been claimed he contributed to the preface on halakha (Jewish law) regarding the heter mechirah (sale permit) for the Sabbatical year (Note: Kook's responsum arose in the context of a crisis, a sense of impending catastrophe, among mystics at Jerusalem's Beit El Kabbalist yeshiva caused by the Aleppo rabbi Ḥaim Shaul Dweck haCohen ((1857-1933)) who broke with that school's tradition by reviving the practice advocated by Shalom Shar'abi regarding the minutiae of performance of mindful devotion in prayer (kavanah) during the Sabbatical year (Giller 2008, pp. 71–73)) attached to his father's work Shabbat Haaretz, which was published in 1910.

Feeling that he had not devoted enough time to Torah study he first went to Porat Yoseph, the leading Sephardic yeshiva of Jerusalem. Then, on Binyamin Levin's suggestion, he left for Halberstadt, Germany to teach at the local yeshiva and study philosophy. In addition to his own studies, Kook taught Talmud, halakha, and Bible to young men in the area.

With the outbreak of World War I in 1914, Kook was arrested as a citizen of the Russian Empire, an enemy of Germany. After several weeks in a detention camp in Hamburg, he was released and allowed to return to Halberstadt, where he needed to report once every two days in the local office. Only the following year, at the end of 1915, was he granted permission to leave Germany and join his father, who was stranded in St. Gallen, Switzerland, due to the war. There he continued to study under his father's guidance, until the latter left to fill a rabbinic position in London in 1916.

In 1920, he returned to Palestine (then under the British Mandate) and began teaching at Netzakh Israel school. A year later, he went to Europe to promote his father's new movement, Degel Yerushalayim (lit. 'Standard of Jerusalem') a spiritual complement of secular Zionism.

In 1922, he married Chava Leah Hutner in Warsaw. Chava Leah died childless in February 1944, and Kook refused to remarry, remaining a widower until his death nearly 40 years later. (Note: Zealots in Jerusalem gossiped that his wife's early death, and their childlessness, among other misfortunes in the Kook families, were punishments resulting from curses by Kabbalists laid against the Kooks for their unforgivable sins (Mirsky 2014, p. 224).) From 1923, he served as the administrative director of the Mercaz HaRav yeshiva. After Harlap died in 1952, he became Rosh Yeshiva until his own death. The yeshiva assumed its present stature only much later.

Kook père had died in 1935, at a time when religious thinkers had a negligible impact on the Yishuv and his ideas had failed to attract much attention among both religious and Zionist Jews. The yeshiva's fortunes waned, and it struggled to survive down to the 1960s, when it managed to attract a spare 20 students. In the mid-sixties, its standing rapidly improved as a result of frustrations encountered among elite graduates of Bnei Akiva when their attempts to exert influence in the National Religious Party were met with a rebuff. Thereafter, this group, which constituted a secretive fraternity called Gahelet (Note: Gahelet is an acronym for "Nucleus of Torah-Learning Pioneers" and means Embers in Hebrew (Lustick 1988, p. 34).) (Note: "Gahelet was a group of students at a school belonging to Israel's non-orthodox stream, which was then at its lowest ebb. Possessed of a naïve, intense enthusiasm for traditional religious Judaism, coupled with feelings of inferiority and envy with regard to the modern secular Zionist world, these young people sought to participate in the dynamics and achievements of that world. They developed a strikingly original and ambitious worldview that differed significantly from both religious and secular-national perspectives, and they sought religious validation for their initiative in a father-son team of rabbis ... members of Gahelet appropriated the doctrine of Rabbi Kook the Elder, transforming it from the esoteric and quietistic dogma of a small and marginal circle into a gospel which spread through Israel to serve as a platform for the ensuing activism. By adopting Rabbi Kook the Younger as their spiritual leader, members of Gahelet propelled him from the status of a forgotten, ridiculed figure at the margins of the Torah and Zionist worlds into an outstanding Israeli personality with a magnetic influence on a broad circle." (Aran 1994, pp. 270–271)) (including such rabbinical figures as Eliezer Waldman, Moshe Levinger and Haim Druckman) shifted their attentions towards Kook and his yeshiva. After the Six-Day War in 1967, of which he has been called 'the ultimate theologian,' he induced the Israeli government to approve the building of settlements in the West Bank and Gaza and sent his students to that mission. He subscribed to his father's view that the Chief Rabbinate in Palestine was the precursor of the future Sanhedrin.

Kook wrote little in his final years. His remarks were elliptical in their allusive references to rabbinical traditions many of his followers were unfamiliar with, and his authority rested more on his charismatic figure – charisma was something his father stressed – than his writings. He died in Jerusalem on 9 March 1982, which coincided with Purim that year, and was buried in the Mount of Olives Jewish Cemetery. His passing created a leadership vacuum within Gush Emunim, which subsequently moved in the direction of collective decision making.

== Ideology ==
Zionism began as a secular movement often led by disbelievers many of whom rejected Jewish religious traditions, one of which held that any collective "return" of the Jewish people, as opposed to individual aliyah, depended on the direct intervention of the Messiah. The Kooks' innovation consisting in elaborating a theology that bridged the gap between a faith that saw Zionism as a heresy, and the Zionist programme for the development of a secular state for Jews. As Kook's father phrased it, a Jewish polity must "build secularly and sanctify afterwards."

=== The process of redemption ===
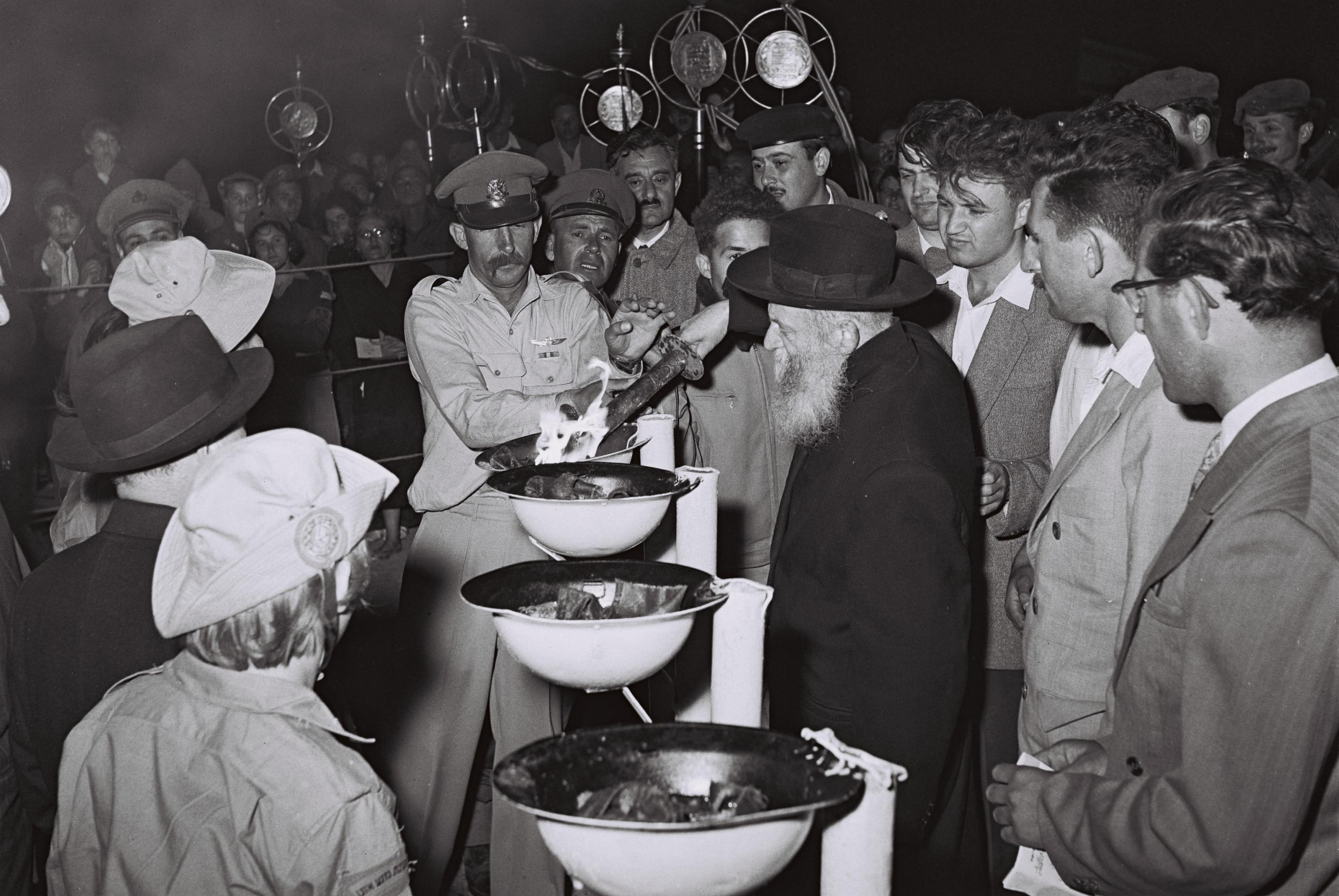
Rabbi Zvi Yehuda Kook lights the torch, independence day eve, 1957

Zvi Kook, together with Harlap, was heir to a tradition of messianic demonizing thought going back at least to Judah Alkalai, in which the redemption of Jews in Israel was a premise for, and precursor to, the general uplifting of mankind. Whereas his father viewed Zionists as unwitting agents in the divine plan for redemption, – only a "slim membrane" was all that separated antinomian messianism, of the type disastrously exemplified by Shabbatai Zevi, from authentic messianic redemption, (Note: Kook père's metaphoris adapted from the Kabbalistic idiom kelippat nogah, the "luminous shell" on the limimal margins between good and evil (Mirsky 2014, p. 40))- Zvi Kook went one step further. Believing that the secular state already embodied in nuce the hidden spark of the sacred, (Note: The idea goes back to Isaac Luria (1534-1572):"Luria synthesized the disparate cosmological, metaphysical, and theological doctrines that preceded him into a mythic vision of primordial creation as a great drama of divine withdrawal and resulting catastrophe that set in motion all cosmic history. God, as it were, contracted Himself, leaving in the empty space thus created vestiges of divine light in 'vessels,' nodal points of boundless divine energy contained by a corresponding principle of restraint. Unable to contain the divine light, the vessels shattered, scattering sparks of divine goodness and crude husks of shattered vessels, which together compose the forces of good and evil pulsating through the universe." (Mirsky 2014, pp. 26–27)) he argued that the messianic age of redemption had already arrived This task was to be furthered in the present age by extending Jewish rule over the land occupied by Israel in 1967, also by means of settlements. This redemptive process across generations would, he argued, involve three stages, the first of which had already been achieved: (a) the establishment of the State of Israel, a contemporary expression of the Davidic Kingdom; (b)the restoration of complete Jewish sovereignty against Amalek; (Note: His father thought the idea Israel was superseded by Christianity something that made Christianity intolerable and therefore something to be blotted out. He saw himself as a warrior "fighting our lengthy war, the Lord's war with Amalek, a war of erasing from under the heavens, a war of blotting out all memory." (Ben-Johanan 2016, p. 78)) and, once these two preconditions were satisfied (c) the Third Temple would be established on the Haram al-Sharif/Temple Mount in Jerusalem.

Within Gush Emunim, now defunct, his words were often reported and taken to be akin to prophecies. In Kook's vision, Jews were unique, the yardstick for mankind, with Judaism forming the core of humanity and reality itself, and Israel analogized to the soul while the world at large was likened to the body. (Note: ".'It was (his) contention that the people of Israel were distinguished from the rest of the nations by some of life's most basic elements: the relation ship between body and soul, the relationship between humanity and the universe, and the social relationships between people. When the people of Israel are in their normal state, their uniqueness is evident in all these levels of existence. Kook thus wished to place the uniqueness of Jewish existence on the political agenda to ensure that the government of Israel would take steps to provide the conditions that would allow it to flourish." (Ben-Johanan 2022, p. 201))In this context, Zvi Kook extended the ideas of his father (Note: As early as 1894-1896, in his essay on shlemut entitled Midbar Shur (The Desert of Shur), Kook's father argued that perfection required that Israel remain distinct from other nations, as the soul remained distinct from matter."He taught that the mundane sensible world of ritual observance, rationality, and scientific inference is important as, but is no more than, a vehicle for preparing human beings to approach and eventually apprehend a much more fundamental spiritual reality. This other realm, immanent within the outer world of sensation and cognition, is pervaded by the pulsating illumination of the 'Divine psyche.' For most peoples, at most times, the spiritual energy flowing continuously from this realm is displaced and distorted into various forms of idolatry because they cannot absorb 'the light emanating from the universal spiritual psyche.' The 'instinctive excellence' of the Jewish people consists in the presence of 'the Divine sensitivity at the core of its being,' which permits Jews, as individuals, and as a collectivity, to experience and express the divine illumination in pure, nonidolatrous form.") and his fellow student of kabbalah Harlap, who had an outlook of hostility to Gentiles and asserted that the failure of the peoples of the world to surrender to Israel would cause their downfall. Kook took this Jewish nationalism as in fact cosmopolitan, in the sense that the redemption of the world was contingent on Israel, an idea that proved influential with the early Hapoel HaMizrachi thinkers.

Kook saw in the establishment of the modern State of Israel a major step in the redemption of the Jewish people (Atḥalta de-geulah). Many Torah scholars envision redemption as a future era that arrives complete from the very start, and not an ongoing process. (Note: The idea that atḥalta de-geulah has begun with the establishment of the state of Israel is, according to Louis Jacobs, "a concept for which there is little support in the tradition." (Jacobs 1990, p. 73)) Kook claimed that the process was evidenced in the development of Israeli agriculture where every tomato and banana was invested with "sanctity". He based this idea on (Ezekiel 36:24–28): But you, O mountains of Israel, will produce branches and bear fruit for My people Israel, for they will soon come home, and Rashi's gloss on the way it had been interpreted as an indication of the End by Rabbi Abba at Sanhedrin 9. Rashi wrote: "When the Land of Israel gives its fruit nicely, then the End is near, and there is no more [to the] revealed End [than this]." (Note: The idea is present already in the father's writings. Speaking of the ostensible decline of Judaism in a period of national renaissance (and agitations which, divorced from religion, sucked up its fructifying power), he wrote."These developments cannot go on in their chaotic form. We must mend with courage and with knowledge past abuses. We must gather up all spiritual trends that have been dispersed to their center, to ingather the spiritual fugitives of Israel and the dispersed of Judah. Through this spiritual potency for the ingathering of the exiles there will be released the physical potency for the ingathering upon the holy soil, the place suited for the realization of all ideals in their different aspects from potentiality to actuality. This will be effected not through individuals or parties, but through the nation, through the aggregate of the community of Israel, which will blossom in the beloved land, the fairest heritage of any nation" (Kook 1991, p. 284))

According to his disciple, rabbi Eliyahu Avichail, who founded the immigrant organization Amishav in 1975, Kook himself advised him to search for dispersed communities of Jews who had lost contact with their roots, prepare them for conversion (giyur) and facilitate their "return" to Israel. He believed he had discovered such lost Jews, putative remnants of the Ten Lost Tribes, in India and Nepal among Tibetan-Burmese peoples such as the Mizo and Hmar. Though initially considered a "crackpot", Avichail succeeded, after conferring on these peoples the ethnonym Bnei Menashe, in having some two thousand relocated in Israel, especially in the Israeli settlement near the Palestinian city of Hebron, namely Kiryat Arba, through financial assistance from his philanthropical sponsor Irving Moskowitz.

=== Hostility to Christianity ===
Though his own father was long tempted by the antinomian strain of Jewish messianism, World War I had led him to conclude that the great source of contemporary evil lay in the antinomian dispensation of Christianity. Zvi Kook's ideology, reflecting his father's "intense loathing" or theological disdain, (Note: His father told him that as a child, he could smell the stench of toilets whenever he passed Christian houses (Ben-Johanan 2022, pp. 197, 202).) is characterized by a staunch hostility to Christianity, which he regarded as a "crime against Israel", the "refuse of Israel", an image recalling Talmudic traditions of Jesus, "the criminal of Israel" (poshea Israel), being boiled in excrement. (Note: These views are already present in his father's writings, who also likened Christianity to "a dog swallowing feces, feeding itself from the filth that was secreted out of Judaism in the figure of Jesus." (Ben-Johanan 2016, p. 93).) Christianity was a form of idolatry, a blasphemy against the divinity of Jews. He refused to back away from the antisemitic notion that Jews bore responsibility for Jesus's crucifixion. This apparently was one of his ways of repudiating the victim mentality ascribed to Jews in diaspora.

He began to outline his opinions in this regard in 1952, after concluding that Israel's establishment constituted a war against Western Christendom. Rummaging through two millennia of sources uncritically, such as Toledot Yeshu, he revived a tradition of anti-Christian polemics which, according to some critics, had not seen the likes for over a millennium. (Note: "Zvi Yehudah Kook's writings on Christianity are the most virulent pronouncements on the subject one can find, probably throughout the entire Jewish world." (Ben-Johanan 2022, p. 197)) Key points in this attitude affirm that Christianity is a Jewish heresy; that whereas the Christian god is dead, the Jewish god is alive. He asserted that the term min/minim apostates in rabbinical literature indeed denoted Christians.

When the Vatican hoisted the Israeli flag on the occasion of Golda Meir's visit to Pope Paul VI in 1973, Kook sneered at the pope as an old galakh (shaven, i.e. tonsured Christian priest) unashamedly raising a symbol that signified the destruction of Christendom. He wanted to rid Israel of Christian and ultimately Western influences, something that extended down to opposing the use of the Gregorian civil calendar. He avoided reading his father's works in the light of Western philosophy because that would be a form of "spiritual miscegenation". This influenced his views of Judaism, the authentic version being that practiced and taught in modern Israel as opposed to the Judaism of the exilic diaspora, which was, he thought, irremediably inflected by the deleterious effects of living among Christians.

His writings on this theme circulate among Israeli settlers, or Torah purists aspiring to a life of secluded study and, conversely, among anti-semites.

=== The theology of war ===
Sometimes among his acolytes called the "prophet of Greater Israel", Kook's father had taught that settlement of the land should come about by peaceful means, not by war. (Note: "Abraham Isaac Kook.. urged that Jewish settlement of the land should proceed by peaceful means only. Even a Jewish king, Kook reasoned, would need to consult the High Court before embarking on war, for no war (other than purely defensive) might be pursued against those who observe the Seven Commandments (or Noahide Laws), and if the enemy were idolaters (this would exclude Muslims and Christians) it would still be necessary for the Court to examine their moral condition before declaring the war justified." (Solomon 2005, p. 306)) In 1938 the rabbi of Tel Aviv, Moshe Avigdor Amiel (1883-1946), argued that even if the redemption were to be enabled by killing Arabs, that option would have to be repudiated since it would mean redemption through bloodshed.

Nonetheless, his mystical meditations on war, published in 1921 and edited by Zvi Kook with the title Orot me-Ofel (Lights from the Gloom), which would assume great significance after 1967 among his son's settler acolytes, could be read as providing Kook's rabbinical endorsement for using war to appropriate land, as in the following passages:

When there is a great war in the world, the power of Messiah is aroused.The time of song (zamir) has arrived, the scything (zamir) of tyrants, the wicked perish from the world, and the world is invigorated and the voice of the turtledove is heard in our land.

The ability demanded of the Jewish people is the ability to appropriate the powers of the nations, Esau's aggressive powers, (Note: In rabbinical thought, Esau became a metaphor and code word for Rome and subsequently Christianity (Hacohen 2019, pp. 55–90).) and to use them on the path to the "celestial Jerusalem."

At the same time, dissenters could challenge this use of Kook's authority by citing another passage from the same tract:-

Until such happy times as it will be feasible to conduct an independent national policy without recourse to vicious and barbaric practices.. it is not in the interest of Jacob to wield sovereignty, when this entails wholesale bloodshed and ingenuiity of a sinister kind.

Zvi Kook, with his irredentist perspective, ratcheted up a notch his father's theology of war. Every one of the wars engaged in, prior to the establishment of the state down to the Yom Kippur war, were, in his interpretation, stages on the path of Israel's redemption. While ruling out aggressive war, Zvi Kook did preach that recourse to military force was justified if Arabs refused to acknowledge Jewish rights to the land and if they also opted to wage war. According to his former student, David Samson

He compared [our situation] to a man who was forcefully expelled from his home, which others seized and trespassed upon. That is exactly what happened to us. Rav Kook stressed that the Arabs had, and have, absolutely no national right to the land. If they deny the justice of our cause, and choose to go to war against us, we must persuade them – he said – with our tanks.

=== Political views ===
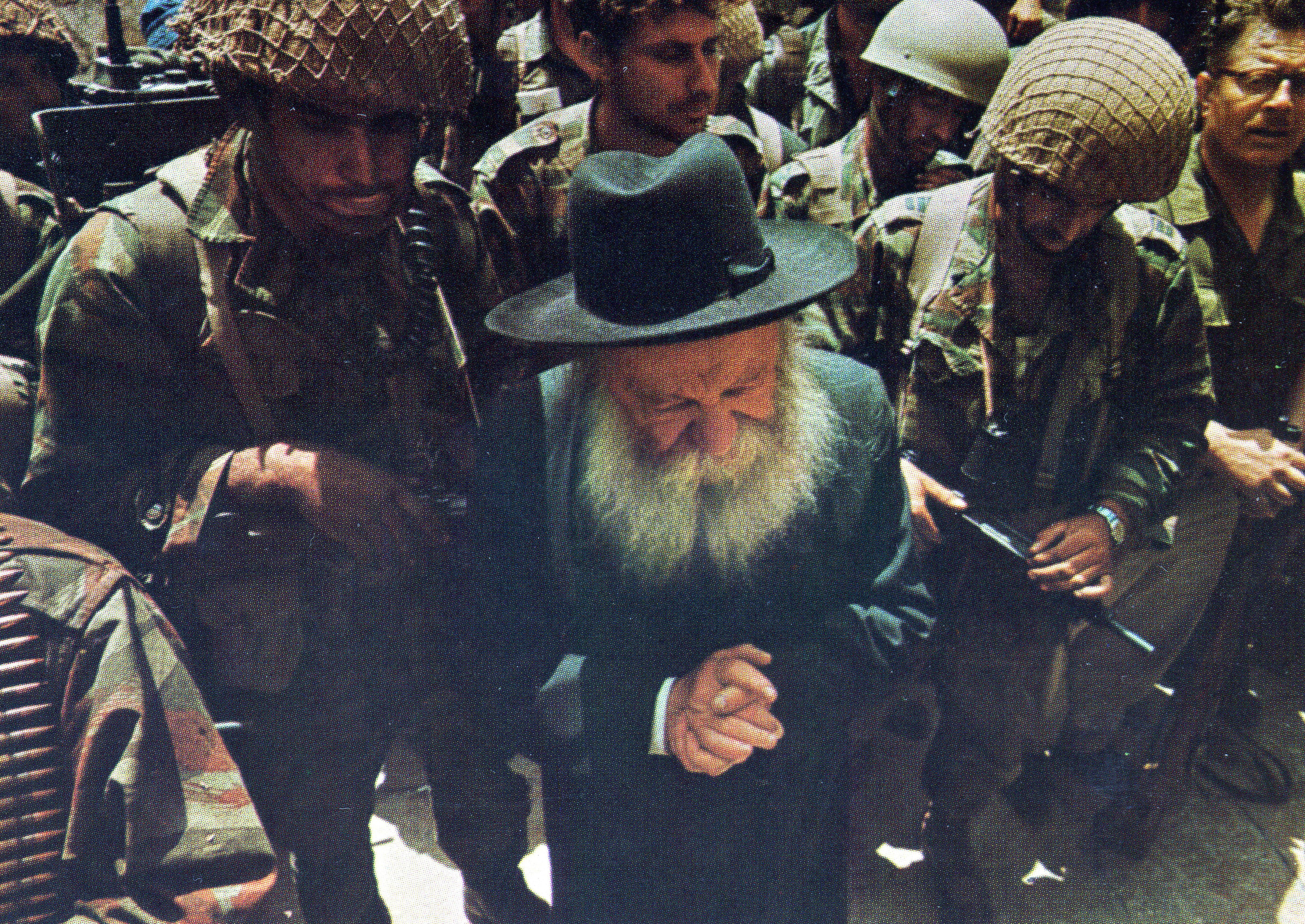
Rabbi Zvi Yehuda Kook with Israeli forces at the Western Wall shortly after its capture in 1967

The teachings of Zvi Kook are considered to be the source for the ongoing tension among Israeli settlers between the idea that the state of Israel is sacred, and doubts whether its secular authority could be exercised independently,

Initially, Zvi Kook had expressed unreserved support for Zionism, and was fiercely opposed to orthodox critics of that ideology, seeing Zionism as a vehicle embodying God's will for the redemption of the Jews. Even before the Six Days War Kook expressed concern for Jewish Biblical sites in the adjacent West Bank under Jordanian rule. On the eve of the outbreak of hostilities he shocked his students by speaking of the "truncated" state of the Land of Israel, inducing in them a sense that they had sinned in forgetting about places like Hebron, Shechem and Jericho. (Note: "Nineteen years ago, on the night when news of the United Nations decision in favor of the re-establishment of the state of Israel reached us, when the people streamed into the streets to celebrate and rejoice, I could not go out and join in the jubilation. I saty alone in silence; a burden lay upon me. During those first hours I could not resign myself to what had been done. I could not accept the fact that indeed "they have.. divided My Land "(Joel 4:2)! … where is our Hebron. Have we forgotten her?! Where is our Shechem, our Jericho-where? Have we forgotten them?" (Frey 2007, p. 88)) He hailed Israel's 1967 victory as proof of the emergence of God's leadership over both Israel and the entire world. The Yom Kippur War proved to be a watershed moment for his thinking. In its aftermath, his views underwent a sea-change. He vigorously opposed proposals to yield territory such as those being advanced by Henry Kissinger, whom he dismissed as "the goy woman's husband", arguing that God's desire for the territorial integrity of the Land of Israel, in his view a single sacred entity, overruled any human desire for negotiated compromises. The laws of the Torah took precedence over secular law.

At a 1974 lecture delivered at Merkaz Haraz in the presence of Moshe Dayan, he stated that moves to yield the Golan, and the West Bank would lead to a war, one that would be fought "over our bodies and limbs". The Gush Emunim movement predominantly formed by religious Zionists soon came under the dominating influence of graduates from Mercaz HaRav driven by a messianic activism to thwart territorial compromises. Surrendering territory was, he taught, as strictly forbidden as eating pork, since foreign sovereignty over any part of the Land of Israel would be treif.

Eventually Zvi Kook came round to considering the Israeli government itself as illegitimate, as a tyrannical dictatorship. It was an offense to God to seek Gentile support. Referendums thermselves were illegitimate because they could never overturn the prescriptions of the Torah He opposed Menachem Begin's peace negotiations with Egypt – in his view the Sinai formed part of Biblical Israel -and also Begin's proposal to allow West Bank Palestinians administrative autonomy. These ideas, if acted on, would constitute in Kook's view treason and would cover Israel with "eternal shame" Though Kook disapproved of religious coercion in Israel, he argued that the rabbinical concept of peace, shalom reflected a state of absolute justice, which required at times the force of coercion, and did not entail, as in the modern assumption, an implicit renunciation in principle of recourse to violence. Peace will only obtain when the Biblical Land of Israel is revived, with the Temple, and the subservience of the nations of the world to the Chosen People.

He staunchly opposed any political moves to relinquish parts of the Land of Israel. "We are not a nation of conquerors. We are returning to the land of our fathers. No one, no prime minister, has the authority to renounce any part of the country. It belongs to the entire people of Israel, to the Jews of Pakistan, the United States and the Soviet Union."

=== Relationship with Meir Kahane ===
According to the widow of Rabbi Meir Kahane, Kook greatly admired Kahane. (Note: "Rabbi Tzvi Yehuda invited Meir to accompany him to the Western Wall. Before they went, the rabbi asked another student, Rabbi Yaakov Filber, to bring his camera, and they were photographed together in the sukka and again at the Western Wall. Rabbi Yosef Bramson pointed out that Kook did not like to be photographed, but he admired Meir so much that he actually requested it." (Kahane 2008, p. 225)) When Kahane formed a political party, Kook endorsed his bid for a Knesset seat. Though he had originally been a staunch supporter of the National Religious Party, he broke with them in 1974 after they entered the Rabin government over his opposition. In his letter of support to Kahane, he stated: "The presence of Rabbi Meir Kahane and his uncompromising words from the Knesset platform will undoubtedly add strength and value to the obligatory struggle on behalf of the entire Land of Israel." The announcement of his support of Kahane and his letter were made available to the Jewish Telegraphic Agency.

According to his student Rabbi Uzi Kalheim, however, Kook's support of Kahane was more nuanced. The rabbi approved of Kahane's activities in the U.S. to protect Jews and bolster Jewish pride. But in Israel, Kook did not agree with Kahane's positions but felt that Kahane should have the right to a place in the Knesset and express his views there, even though Kook did not assent to them. He is quoted as explicitly writing that his support for Kahane was "without any identification with or connection to the specifics of his words and aims".

=== Views on Palestinians/Arabs ===
Kook's view was that Israel's struggle with the Arabs over the Land of Israel is a national one. While denying that Jews had ever expelled Palestinians in the Palestinian exodus in 1948-49 – in his view they had all simply ran away of their own accord, through cowardice or exaggerated fear – Zvi Kook thought those remaining could stay provided they accepted that the land was Jewish and acquiesced in their status as a minority. Prior to 1967, he considered the conflict between Arabs and Israelis as ethnic not religious. They were in his view unlike Christians, whom he considered idolatrous, a purely monotheistic people and therefore, in their case, the conflict with Jews would be a passing matter. The rights of individual minorities were to be respected. When the Israeli High Court ruled that the Elon Moreh group of settlers had to evacuate lands under Palestinian ownership and belonging to the village of Rujeib, the rabbi told his followers to abide by the court's verdict, even though his ideological view was that "there is no such thing as Arab land in Eretz Israel." Benny Katzover recalled: "The rabbi told us several times, 'We cannot damage land belonging to Ahmad and Mustafa', that we couldn't touch lands that had belonged to Arabs for generations."

On several occasions he sent letters to newspapers expressing his displeasure over reports that Arabs were being maltreated.

== Students ==
Zvi Kook's influence as a religious authority on the fundamentalist rabbis who drove the settler movement has been thought of as to some degree analogous to the impact of religious figures like Sayyid Qutb and Ayatollah Khomeini on younger generations of intellectuals who were to figure prominently in the radicalization of Islam.

The most well known among his students are rabbis Shlomo Aviner, (Note: Aviner, in his book The Christian Enemy, developed Kook's ideas, arguing that:"human history began with idolaters; the Israeli nation appeared and disseminated morality among the human race; idolaters struggled against God's people but were unable to vanquish them until, ultimately, 'in the face of a combined attack by evil men from without and evil passions from within,' the people of Israel collapsed and withdrew into themselves, and their influence over the nations was lost," occasioning the rise of Christianity (Ben-Johanan 2022, p. 225).) Zvi Thau, Yisrael Ariel Zalman Melamed, Yitzchak Sheilat, Dov Lior, Zephaniah Drori, Yoel Bin-Nun, Eliezer Melamed, David Samson, Haim Drukman, Moshe Levinger, and Yaakov Ariel. Several of these students are among those whom he encouraged to establish settlements and moshavim.

== Writings ==
Most of the younger Kook's published works were editions and collections of his father's work, but many of his original articles and letters were later collected and published in book form.

- Collections of articles: Or Lenetivati, Lenetivot Israel, two volumes.
- Collections of letters: Tzemach Tzvi, Dodi Litzvi. Some of his letters are printed in Igrot HaRa'aya.
- Lectures: Sichot HaRav Tzvi Yehuda on the Torah (5 volumes), Mesilat Yesharim, Moadim (festivals), etc., by Rabbi Shlomo Aviner.

== See also ==
- Jewish fundamentalism

== Sources ==
- Aran, Gideon (1994). "Jewish Zionist Fundamentalism: The Bloc of the Faithful in Israel (Gush Emunim)". In Marty, Martin E.; Appleby, Scott (eds.). Fundamentalisms Observed. Vol. 1. University of Chicago Press. pp. 265–343. ISBN 978-0-226-50878-8.
- Auerbach, Jerold S. (1996). Jacob's Voices: Reflections of a Wandering American Jew. Southern Illinois University Press. ISBN 978-0-809-32055-4.
- Ben-Johanan, Karma (Winter 2016). "Wreaking Judgment on Mount Esau: Christianity in R. Kook's Thought". The Jewish Quarterly Review. 106 (1): 76–100. doi:10.1353/jqr.2016.0004. JSTOR jewiquarrevi.106.1.76. S2CID 170926041.
- Ben-Johanan, Karma (2022). Jacob's Younger Brother: Christian-Jewish Relations After Vatican II. Harvard University Press. ISBN 978-0-674-25826-6.
- Ben-Pazi, Hanoch (2017). "R. Abraham Isaac Kook and the Opening Passage of "The War"". Journal of Jewish Thought & Philosophy. 25 (2): 256–278. doi:10.1163/1477285X-12341287 – via ResearchGate.
- Brill, Alan; Neiss, Rory Picker (2012). "Jewish Views of World Religions: Four Models". In Gottstein, Alon Goshen-; Korn, Eugene (eds.). Jewish Theology and World Religions. Liverpool University Press. pp. 41–60. ISBN 978-1-909-82105-7.
- Čejka, Marek; Kořan, Roman (2015). Rabbis of our Time: Authorities of Judaism in the Religious and Political Ferment of Modern Times. Routledge. ISBN 978-1-317-60544-7.
- Dowty, Alan (2001). The Jewish State: A Century Later, (Updated With a New Preface). University of California Press. ISBN 978-0-520-22911-2.
- Egorova, Yulia (2016). "Lost Tribes Communities, Israel, and Notions of Jewishness". In Parfitt, Tudor; Fisher, Netanel (eds.). Becoming Jewish: New Jews and Emerging Jewish Communities in a Globalized World. Cambridge Scholars Publishing. pp. 36–48. ISBN 978-1-443-84960-9.
- Fishman, Tzvi; Samson, David (21 March 2019). "We Must Persuade Them… With Our Tanks': The Worldview of Rav Zvi Yehuda Kook On His 37th Yahrzeit". The Jewish Press. Archived from the original on 21 January 2021.
- Frey, Rebecca Joyce (2007). Fundamentalism. Infobase Publishing. ISBN 978-1-438-10899-5.
- Giller, Pinchas (2008). Shalom Shar'abi and the Kabbalists of Beit El. Oxford University Press (USA). ISBN 978-0-195-32880-6.
- Goldman, Shalom (2009). Zeal for Zion: Christians, Jews, & the Idea of the Promised Land. University of North Carolina Press. ISBN 978-0-807-83344-5.
- Hacohen, Malachi Haim (2019). Jacob & Esau Jewish European History Between Nation and Empire. Cambridge University Press. ISBN 978-1-316-51037-7.
- Hellinger, Moshe; Hershkowitz, Isaac; Susser, Bernard (2018). The 'Disengagement' from Gaza/Gush Katif in Religious Zionism and the Settlement Project: Ideology, Politics, and Civil Disobedience. SUNY Press. ISBN 978-1-438-46840-2.
- Hoch, Richard L. (1994). "Sovereignty, Sanctity, and Salvation: The Theology of Rabbi Tzvi Yehudah Ha-Kohen and the Actions of Gush Emunim". Shofar. 13 (1): 90–118. doi:10.1353/sho.1994.0047. JSTOR 42942067. S2CID 170258662.
- Inbari, Motti (2012). Messianic Religious Zionism Confronts Israeli Territorial Compromises. Cambridge University Press. ISBN 978-1-107-00912-7.
- Ish-Shalom, Benjamin (2012). Rav Avraham Itzhak Hacohen Kook: Between Rationalism and Mysticism. SUNY Press. ISBN 978-1-438-40763-0.
- Jacobs, Louis (1990). God, Torah, Israel: Traditionalism without Fundamentalism. ISD LLC. ISBN 978-0-878-20471-7. Archived from the original on 13 June 2022.
- Juergensmeyer, Mark (2003). Terror in the Mind of God: The Global Rise of Religious Violence. University of California Press. ISBN 978-0-520-93061-2.
- Kahane, Libby (2008). Rabbi Meir Kahane: His Life and Thought,1932-1975. Vol. 1. Israel: Urim Publications. ISBN 978-1-518-87061-3.
- "Kook Supports Kahane". JTA. 31 January 1977. Archived from the original on 29 June 2016.
- Kook, Abraham Isaac (1991). "On the Reasons for the Commandments". In Gellman, Ezra (ed.). Essays on the Thought and Philosophy of Rabbi Kook. Fairleigh Dickinson University Press. pp. 269–284. ISBN 978-0-845-34826-0.
- Kook, Zvi Yehuda (1967). LeNetivot Yisrael. Vol. I. Tel Aviv: Menorah.
- Levinson, Chaim; Ettinger, Yair (11 March 2012). "Rabbi Kook's Followers Are Still Debating His Legacy". Haaretz. Archived from the original on 3 May 2016.
- Lustick, Ian S. (1988). For the Land and the Lord: Jewish Fundamentalism in Israel. Council of Foreign Relations. ISBN 978-0-876-09036-7.
- Magid, Shaul (15 March 2019). "Kahane Won: How the radical rabbi's ideas and disciples took over Israeli politics, and why it's dangerous". Tablet.
- Magid, Shaul (2021). Meir Kahane: The Public Life and Political Thought of an American Jewish Radical. Princeton University Press. ISBN 978-0-691-21266-1.
- Mirsky, Yehudah (2014). Rav Kook: Mystic in a Time of Revolution. Yale University Press. ISBN 978-0-300-16424-4.
- Mirsky, Yehudah (2021). Towards the Mystical Experience of Modernity: The Making of Rav Kook, 1865-1904. Academic Studies Press. ISBN 978-1-644-69530-2.
- Neuman, Tamara (2018). Settling Hebron: Jewish Fundamentalism in a Palestinian City. University of Pennsylvania Press. ISBN 978-0-812-29482-8.
- Newman, David (2007). "Gush Emunim". In Skolnik, Fred (ed.). Encyclopaedia Judaica: Ba-Blo. Encyclopedia Judaica. Vol. 8 (2nd ed.). Thompson/Gale/Keter Publishing House. pp. 143–145. ISBN 978-0-028-65939-8.
- Pedahzur, Ami (2012). The Triumph of Israel's Radical Right. Oxford University Press(USA). ISBN 978-0-199-74470-1.
- Prior, Michael (1997). The Bible and Colonialism: A Moral Critique. A&C Black. ISBN 978-0-567-36922-2.
- "Rabbi Zvi Kook dies: Israeli ultranationalist". The New York Times. 11 March 1982.
- Schwartz, Dov (2002). Faith at the Crossroads: A Theological Profile of Religious Zionism. BRILL. ISBN 978-9-004-12461-5.
- Shohet, Azriel (2013). The Jews of Pinsk, 1881 to 1941. Stanford University Press. ISBN 978-0-804-78502-0.
- Skolnik, Fred, ed. (2007). "Kook, Ẓevi Judah ben Abraham Isaac HaCohen". Encyclopaedia Judaica: Ba-Blo. Encyclopedia Judaica. Vol. 13 (2nd ed.). Thompson/Gale/Keter Publishing House. p. 293. ISBN 978-0-028-65939-8.
- Solomon, Norman (June 2005). "Judaism and the ethics of war". International Review of the Red Cross. 87 (858): 296–309. doi:10.1017/S1816383100181354. S2CID 145303911 – via ResearchGate.
- Volbershtein, Hilah (2010). Mashmia Yeshu'ah. Mercaz Shapiro, Israel: Machon Ohr Eztion. ISBN 978-9-65727718-8.
- Weisburd, David (2010). Jewish Settler Violence: Deviance as Social Reaction. Penn State Press. ISBN 978-0-271-03862-9.
- Zinger, Zvi; Ish-Shalom, Benjamin (2007). "Kook (Kuk), Abraham Isaac". In Skolnik, Fred (ed.). Encyclopaedia Judaica: Ba-Blo. Encyclopedia Judaica. Vol. 13 (2nd ed.). Thompson/Gale/Keter Publishing House. pp. 289–293. ISBN 978-0-028-65939-8.
