= Yehuda Etzion =

Israeli religious right-wing activist and terrorist

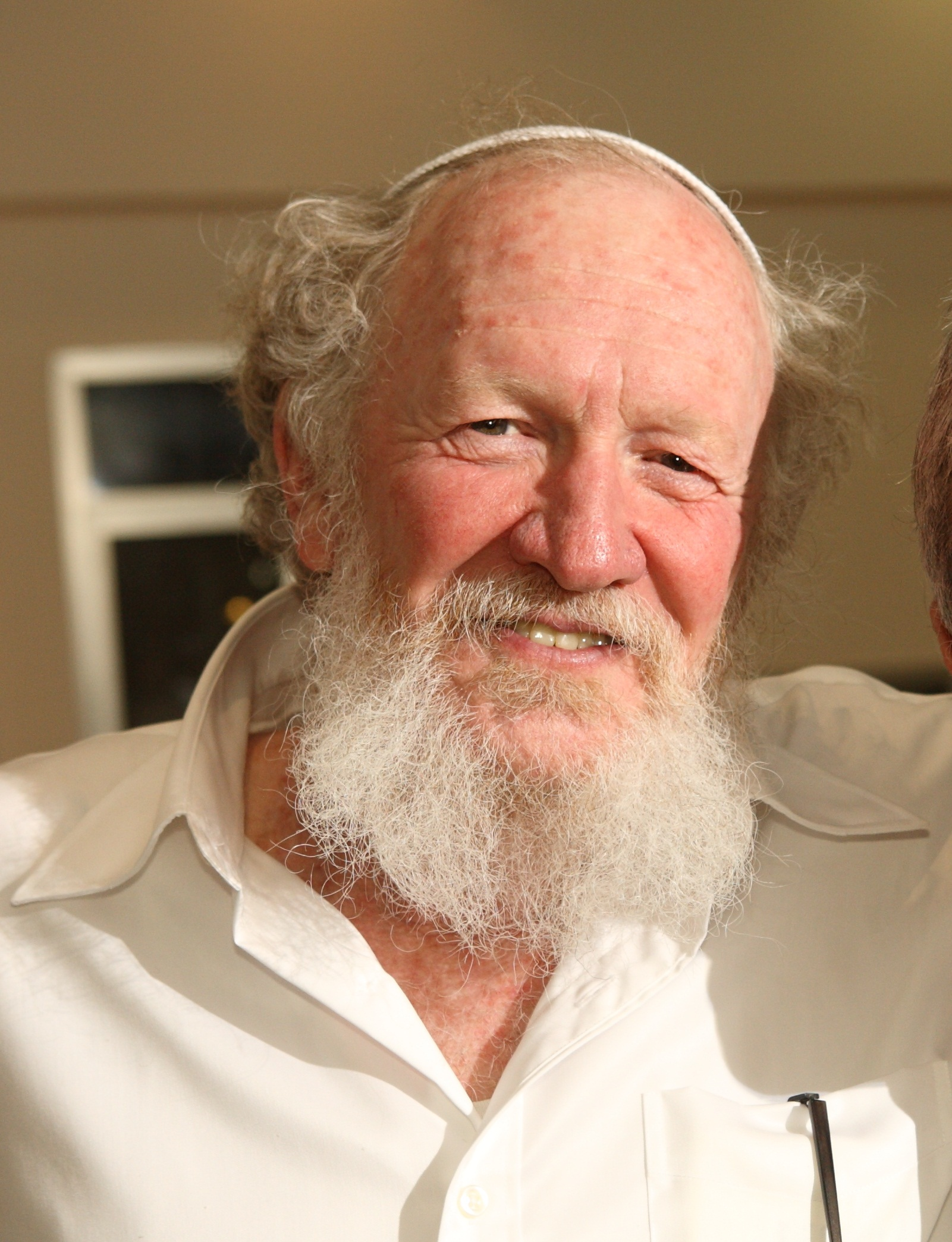
Yehuda Etzion

Yehuda Etzion (Hebrew: יהודה עציון; born 1951) is an Israeli religious right-wing activist and the founder of Hai Vekayam, a group dedicated to allowing Jewish prayer on the Temple Mount. He was a member of the Jewish Underground and participated in a plot to blow up the Dome of the Rock, for which he was arrested and imprisoned in 1984 for acts of terrorism.

== Personal life ==
Etzion was born in 1951 in kibbutz Ein Tzurim. His father, Abraham Mintz, was a member of Lehi. He was a member of Bnei Akiva, and studied at Yeshivat Har Etzion in Alon Shvut. He was a founder of Gush Emunim, and helped found Ofra, where he now lives.

Etzion speaks Arabic.

== Jewish Underground ==
Following the 1979 Egypt–Israel peace treaty, Etzion began to lose faith in the Israeli government. Inspired by the deathbed request of his mentor Shabtai Ben-Dov, he hatched a plot to blow up the Dome of the Rock. He and co-conspirator Menachem Livni hoped that destroying the Dome of the Rock would trigger a war between Israel and her Arab neighbors, from which only Israel would emerge victorious. This would trigger the building of the third temple and a recreation of the kingdom of Israel.

Etzion's preparations to blow up the Dome of the Rock included studying its defenses, drawing maps, acquiring aerial photos and collecting relevant intelligence. Before his arrest in the spring of 1984, Etzion had acquired four major explosive devices (20 kilograms each) that were intended to bring down the four pillars of the Dome as well as twelve medium-sized explosive devices (7 kilograms each) that would bring down the twelve columns surrounding the Dome. In an interview with Ari Shavit, Etzion said of the preparations: "In my mind I already saw the Dome collapsing on itself with a huge cloud of rising dust. And then the confusion stops and Israel's stuttering stops and there is clarity at last as one chapter ends and another begins." Etzion has said he was fascinated by the Temple Mount in Jerusalem since childhood and that he became fixated on the need to reclaim it after the Six Day War broke out. "The Temple Mount is the focal point of the land. But it is in the hands of gentiles. As long as the Al-Aqsa mosque and the Omar mosque stand on the Temple Mount, there can be no salvation for Israel."

== Current activities ==
Etzion founded Hai Vekayam, a group dedicated to allowing Jewish prayer on the Temple Mount against Israeli government restrictions and majority rabbinical opinion that Jews' entry to the site is forbidden. On several occasions, the group has organized civil disobedience wherein its members, wearing Jewish prayer shawls, attempt to ascend to the mount to pray. He also organizes annual recreations of the paschal sacrifice the day before Passover in the Abu Tor neighborhood of Jerusalem.

Etzion has published the collected writings of Shabtai Ben-Dov.
