= Elyakim Haetzni =

Israeli politician and lawyer (1926–2022)

- אליקים העצני
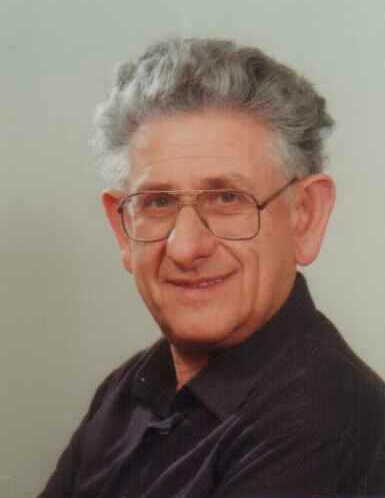
- Haetzni in the early 1990s

Faction represented in the Knesset
- 1988–1992: Tehiya

Personal details
- Born: Georg Bombach; 22 June 1926 Kiel, Province of Schleswig-Holstein, Germany
- Died: 18 September 2022 (aged 96) Jerusalem, Israel
- Spouse: Tzippora Haetzni (m. 1955; died 2018)
- Children: 4
- Education: Hebrew University of Jerusalem

Elyakim Haetzni (Hebrew: אליקים העצני; 22 June 1926 – 18 September 2022) was a German-born Israeli lawyer, settlement activist and politician who served as a member of the Knesset for Tehiya from 1990 until 1992. He is regarded as the father of the Israeli settler movement.

== Early life and career ==
Haetzni was born Georg Bombach in 1926 in Kiel. He attended Reformrealgymnasium Humboldt-Schule until 22 December 1937, when he was expelled as the last Jewish student, instead enrolling at a private school. Haetzni emigrated to Mandatory Palestine in 1938 with his parents and sister, following the Kristallnacht pogroms. Other relatives remained in Kiel, four of whom were deported to Poland and murdered in Majdanek concentration camp and the ghetto of Żołynia.

The family settled in the Kerem Avraham neighbourhood of Jerusalem. He studied at the Mizrachi Teachers' Seminary in Jerusalem, and was a member of the Haganah. He was severely wounded in the 1948 Arab-Israeli War and spent eighteen months in hospital. He went on to attend the Hebrew University of Jerusalem, graduating with a law degree in 1954. Whilst a student, he was a founding member of the Sherut HaMitnavdim volunteer organisation, which helped new immigrants. He was a member of the youth wing of the Mapai.

Haetzni served in the 1948 Arab–Israeli War, during which he was severely injured by a Jordanian air strike while escorting convoys in the Battle for Jerusalem. In 1961, he established a law firm in Tel Aviv. After Israel's victory in the Six-Day War in 1967, he was involved in Jewish settlement in the West Bank, including the re-establishment of the Etzion Bloc and a Jewish community in Hebron. In 1972, coincidentally on the day of the Munich massacre,, he moved from Ramat Gan to the new Kiryat Arba settlement near Hebron. He later opened a law practice in the settlement, serving both Jewish and Arab clients. He became a member of the Yesha Council's Steering Committee, and joined the right-wing Tehiya party. He was on the party's list for the 1988 Knesset elections, but failed to win a seat. However, he entered the Knesset on 31 January 1990 as a replacement for Eliezer Waldman.

=== Views ===
Haetzni supported Greater Israel, believing that Arab Israelis should be given autonomy, but not granted citizenship. Following the death of Yeshayahu Leibowitz, Haetzni criticised Leibowitz's comparisons between Israel and Nazi Germany as promoting antisemitism.

Haetzni was a critic of Prime Minister Yitzhak Rabin, whom he blamed for repeated attacks by Palestinians on Jewish settlers in the West Bank. He subsequently encouraged civil disobedience and called for other settlers to ignore government orders to dismantle or stop the construction of settlements. In an interview with journalist David Berlin, Haetzni stated that the plan was to overload Israeli jails with arrests, further saying that he would never move from the West Bank and was willing to accept living under Palestinian rule over relocation. In 1992, with the sigantures of hundreds of supportive politicians, he wrote a four-page letter to Rabin,who had pledged to reduce the financial support of and the overall number of Jewish settlements in the West Bank, urging Rabin to reconsider and describing his plans as a "red line" and a "betrayal of Judaism and Zionism". Following Rabin's assassination in 1995, Haetzni was one of several right-wing politicians to be interrogated. He later appeared on the American talk show Nightline with the widow Leah Rabin, calling her "divisive" for her positive relationship with Yasser Arafat compared to her interactions with Benjamin Netanyahu. After the show, Haetzni accused her of "us[ing] the tremendous power of her bereavement to advance the interests of the Labor Party". He later described Rabin as a "patriot [...] but not a genius", viewing him as a figurehead for previous PM Shimon Peres.

In 2004, Haetzni described Prime Minister Ariel Sharon, who had announced the dismantlement of all Israeli settlements in the Gaza Strip, as a "defector from the nationalist camp regarding our right to the land of Israel to the other camp — the camp of the left-wingers". He called the settlement dismantlement "a crime against humanity", likening it to the 1492 expulsion of Jews from Spain, and stating that Sharon should be tried as a war criminal at the International Criminal Court in The Hague.

In 2013, Haetzni likened the Oslo Accords to the Nazi-era Munich Agreement, reasoning that peace between Israelis and Palestinians would encourage Palestinian political violence, calling the Second Intifada a direct consequence of the accords.

He was critical of the 2020 Israel–Palestine peace plan proposed by United States President Donald Trump, as it supported Palestinian statehood, calling the plan "poison in a candy wrapper".

== Personal life ==
Haetzni was married to Tzippora, also known as Deborah or Tzip, since around 1955, until her death in 2018. The couple had four children. His granddaughter, Sara Haetzni-Cohen, was a chairwoman of My Israel. Haetzni was secular.

In 2000, Haetzni was the subject of a complaint by Peace Now, which sought sedition charges after Haetzni publicly declared that the removal of militant settlers from a Palestinian section of Hebron by the Israel Defense Forces was the start of a "civil war", calling for soldiers to disobey orders and for the settlers to form a "private militia".

== Death ==
Haetzni died on 18 September 2022 at the age of 96 while at Hadassah Medical Center. He was buried on 19 September in Hebron.

Shortly before his death, Haetzni received the Jerusalem Prize. His settler advocacy was praised by Prime Minister Benjamin Netanyahu and Minister of Defense Benny Gantz.
