= Yuval Ne'eman =

Israeli scientist

- יובל נאמן
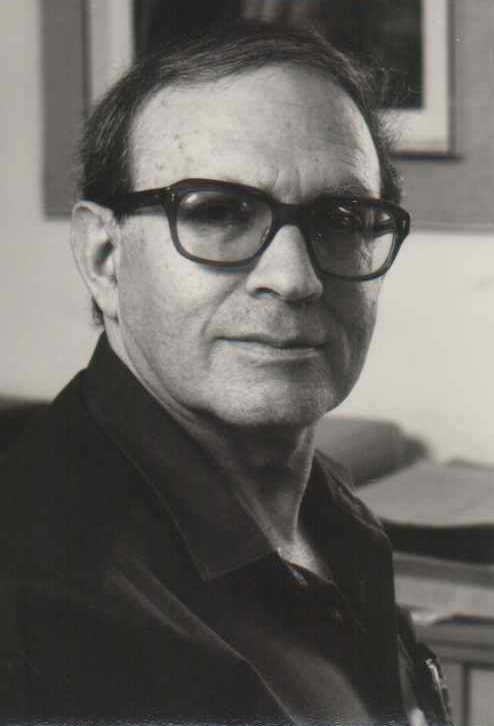

Leader of the Opposition
- De facto 13 September 1984 – 21 October 1984
- Prime Minister: Shimon Peres
- Preceded by: Shimon Peres
- Succeeded by: Victor Shem-Tov

Ministerial roles
- 1982–1984: Minister of Science & Development
- 1990–1992: Minister of Science & Technology
- 1990–1992: Minister of Energy & Infrastructure

Faction represented in the Knesset
- 1981–1992: Tehiya

Personal details
- Born: 14 May 1925 Tel Aviv, Mandatory Palestine
- Died: 26 April 2006 (aged 80) Tel Aviv, Israel
- Education: Technion – Israel Institute of Technology

Yuval Ne'eman (Hebrew: יובל נאמן; 14 May 1925 – 26 April 2006) was an Israeli theoretical physicist, military scientist, and politician. He was Minister of Science and Development in the 1980s and early 1990s. He was the President of Tel Aviv University from 1971 to 1977. He was awarded the Israel Prize in the field of exact sciences (which he returned in 1992 in protest of the award of the Israel Prize to Emile Habibi), the Albert Einstein Award, the Wigner Medal, and the EMET Prize for Arts, Sciences and Culture.

== Biography ==
Yuval Ne'eman was born in Tel Aviv during the Mandate era, graduated from high school at the age of 15, and studied mechanical engineering at the Technion.

At the age of 15, Ne'eman also joined the Haganah. During the 1948 Arab-Israeli War Ne'eman served in the Israel Defense Forces (IDF) as battalion deputy commander, then as Operations Officer of Tel Aviv, and commander of Givati Brigade.

Later (1952–54) he served as Deputy Commander of Operations Department of General Staff, Commander of the Planning Department of the IDF. In this role, he helped organize the IDF into a reservist-based army, developed the mobilization system, and wrote the first draft of Israel's defense doctrine.

Between 1958 and 1960 Ne'eman was IDF Attaché in Great Britain, where he also studied for a PhD in physics under the supervision of 1979 Nobel Prize in Physics winner Abdus Salam at Imperial College London. In 1961, he was demobilized from the IDF with a rank of colonel.

In 1981, Ne'eman became a founding member of the World Cultural Council.

Between 1998 and 2002 Ne'eman was the head of the Israeli Engineer Association.

He died at age 80, on 26 April 2006 in the Ichilov Hospital, Tel Aviv, from a stroke. He was survived by a wife, Dvora; a son and a daughter; and a sister, Ruth Ben-Yisrael (1931-2020).

== Scientific career ==
One of his greatest achievements in physics was his 1961 discovery of the classification of hadrons through the SU(3) flavour symmetry, now named the Eightfold Way, which was also proposed independently by Murray Gell-Mann. This SU(3) symmetry laid the foundation of the quark model, independently proposed by Gell-Mann and George Zweig in 1964.

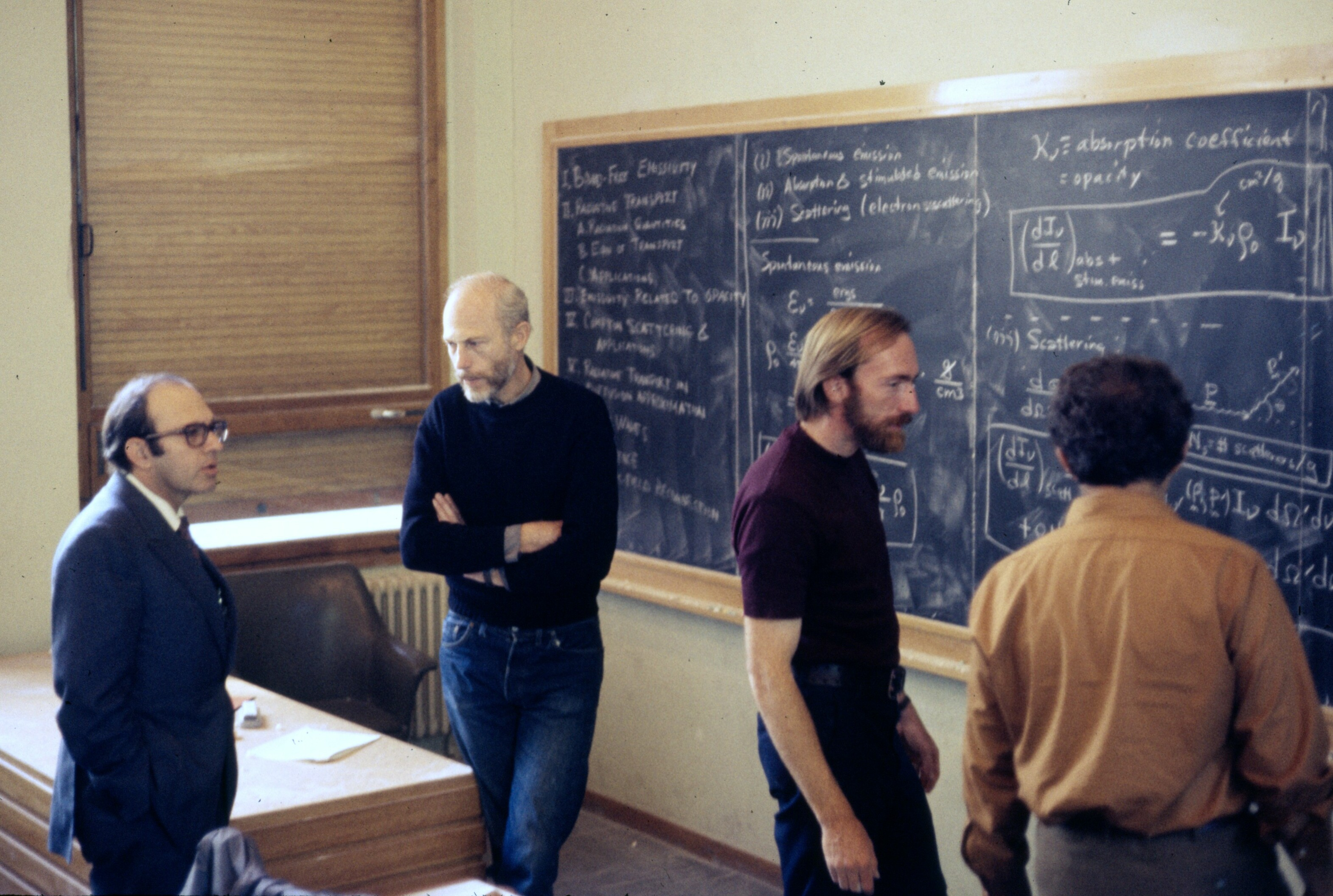
Discussion in the main lecture hall at the École de Physique des Houches (Les Houches Physics School), 1972. From left, Yuval Ne'eman, Bryce DeWitt, Kip Thorne.

Ne'eman was founder and director of the School of Physics and Astronomy at Tel Aviv University from 1965 to 1972, President of Tel Aviv University from 1971 to 1977 (following George S. Wise, and succeeded by Haim Ben-Shahar), and director of its Sackler Institute of Advanced Studies from 1979 to 1997. He was also the co-director (along with George Sudarshan) of the Center for Particle Theory at the University of Texas, Austin from 1968 to 1990. He was a strong believer in the importance of space research and satellites to Israel's economic future and security, and thus founded the Israel Space Agency in 1983, which he chaired almost until his death. He also served on the Israel Atomic Energy Commission from 1965 to 1984 and held the position of scientific director in its Soreq facility. Nee'man was chief scientist of the Defense Ministry from 1974 to 1976.

He was described as "one of the most colorful figures of modern science" and co-authored The Particle Hunters, which was published in English in 1986. The Times Literary Supplement hailed this book as "the best guide to quantum physics at present available".

== Political career ==
In the late 1970s, Ne'eman founded Tehiya, a right-wing breakaway from Likud, formed in opposition to Menachem Begin's support for the Camp David talks that paved the way for peace with Egypt and the evacuation of Yamit. He was elected to the Knesset in the 1981 elections in which Tehiya won three seats. The party joined Begin's coalition about a year after the elections and Ne'eman was appointed Minister of Science and Development, the role later changed to Minister of Science and Technology.

He retained his seat in the 1984 elections, but Tehiya were not included in the grand coalition formed by the Alignment and Likud. After the 1988 elections, Tehiya were again excluded from the governing coalition. Ne'eman resigned from the Knesset on 31 January 1990 and was replaced by Gershon Shafat. However, Tehiya joined the government in June after the Alignment had left, and he was appointed Minister of Energy and Infrastructure and Minister of Science and Technology despite not retaking his seat in the Knesset. He lost his ministerial position following the 1992 elections and did not return to politics.

== Awards and recognition ==
- In 1969, Ne'eman received the Israel Prize in the field of exact sciences (which he returned in 1992 in protest of the award of the Israel Prize to Emile Habibi).
- In 1970, he received the Albert Einstein Award for his unique contribution in the field of physics.
- In 1972, he was elected to the National Academy of Sciences.
- In 1984, he received the Wigner Medal, which is awarded every 2 years for "outstanding contributions to the understanding of physics through group theory."
- In 2003, he received the EMET Prize for Arts, Sciences and Culture for his pioneering contribution in the deciphering of the atomic nucleus and its components, and for his enormous scientific contribution to the development of sub-atomic physics in Israel.

He was also awarded with the College de France Medal and the Officer's Cross of the French Order of Merit (Paris, 1972), the Wigner Medal (Istanbul-Austin, 1982), Birla Science Award (Hyderabad, 1998) and additional prizes and honorary doctorates from universities in Europe and USA.

== See also ==
- List of Israel Prize recipients
