= Fred Skolnik =

American-born writer and editor

Fred Skolnik is an American-born writer and editor. Born in New York City, he has lived in Israel since 1963, working mostly as an editor and translator. Best known as the editor in chief of the 22-volume second edition of the Encyclopaedia Judaica winner of the 2007 Dartmouth Medal and hailed by the Library Journal as a "landmark achievement," he is also the author of four novels and over a hundred stories and essays. A selection of 26 of his stories appeared in 2017 under the title Americans & Other Stories.

== Works ==
=== Encyclopaedia Judaica ===
Skolnik commenced work on the Encyclopaedia in August 2003 and brought the entire project to conclusion editorially in the beginning of 2006, supervising the work of over 50 divisional editors and around 1,200 contributors from his Jerusalem office. More than half of the 20,000 first edition (1972) entries were revised or updated and over 2,500 new entries were produced, together totaling 4.7 million new words. In addition, around 30,000 new bibliographical items were added. Among the renowned international scholars serving as editors were Michael Berenbaum (Holocaust, United States, as well as executive editor), Israel Prize laureates Menachem Elon (Jewish Law), Aviezer Ravitzky (Jewish Philosophy), Moshe Idel (Kabbalah and Hasidism), Jacob Landau (Islam and Muslim Countries), and Ziva Amishai Maisels (Art). Judith R. Baskin headed the entirely new Women and Gender division while Shamma Friedman oversaw the revamping of the Talmud division in accordance with the revolution in talmudic studies. Dina Porat (Antisemitism), Sergio DellaPergola (Demography), and Jonathan Sarna (United States) served as consulting editors. In its award citation the Dartmouth Committee called the new Judaica "an authoritative, interdisciplinary and comprehensive examination of all aspects of Jewish life, history and culture." Among other award-winning projects, Skolnik had also worked on The New Encyclopedia of Judaism (co-editor, 2002) and the 3-volume Encyclopedia of Jewish Life Before and During the Holocaust (senior editor, 2001).

=== The Other Shore ===
Skolnik's first novel is set in Israel in the 1980s, between the Lebanese War and the first Intifada – a pivotal time in the country's recent history that saw its final transformation from a Zionist-socialist society to a Western-style consumer society. The novel follows the lives of representational characters across the entire spectrum of Israeli society but focuses on two families – the Shachars, a kibbutz family, and the Goldsteins, representing the emerging Israeli middle class. In effect the protagonists vie to win the heart and soul of Israel itself. Ranen Omer-Sherman (author of Diaspora and Zionism in Jewish American Literature) has called the novel a "triumph of both the aesthetic and moral imagination." Lewis Fried (author of Handbook of American Jewish Literature) calls it "not only an important addition to Jewish literature but also a necessary one." A 700-page epic, The Other Shore was published in June 2011 by Aqueous Books.

=== Death ===
Skolnik's second novel (Spuyten Duyvil, 2015) is a multilayered narrative ostensibly set in a Hollywood milieu and containing elements of the thriller. It unfolds in a dreamlike atmosphere where ancient and modern mythologies are woven together as the unnamed hero seeks to evade his pursuers and escape his destiny.

=== Basic Forms ===
Skolnik's third novel (Regal House, 2018) sets out to explore the mind of a protagonist who may or may not commit a mass shooting. As stated in the publisher's blurb: "While the act is viewed through the prism of possibility, utilizing parallel sets of characters, images and motifs, and in technique the novel owes something to both Alain Robbe-Grillet and the music of Philip Glass, it was essentially inspired by Charles Whitman, the Texas sniper of the 1960s, and represents an attempt to elucidate the existential meaning of such an act at its deepest level."

=== A Woman of Valor ===
A Woman of Valor (2022) is a monumental family saga that is in effect a history of the Jews in the twentieth century. It centers around a heroine who grows up in Bialystok, survives the Holocaust fighting in the Underground, and rebuilds her family in Israel.

=== Writing as Fred Russell ===
Skolnik also published two novels under his Fred Russell pen name in 2014: Rafi's World (Fomite Press), dealing with Israel's emerging criminal class, and The Links in the Chain (CCLaP), a thriller set in New York against an Arab-Israel background. Chapbook collections of his shorter essays appeared in 2015 and 2016 as Short Takes: American Notes and Short Takes II: Reviews and Opinions and a collection called Aerial Views: 3 Sci-Fi Satires appeared in 2017 as Volume 23 in the Wapshott Press Storylandia series. A third novel, The Nightmare (Moonshine Cove), appeared in 2020.
