= Tehiya =

Israeli ultranationalist political party

Tehiya תחיה
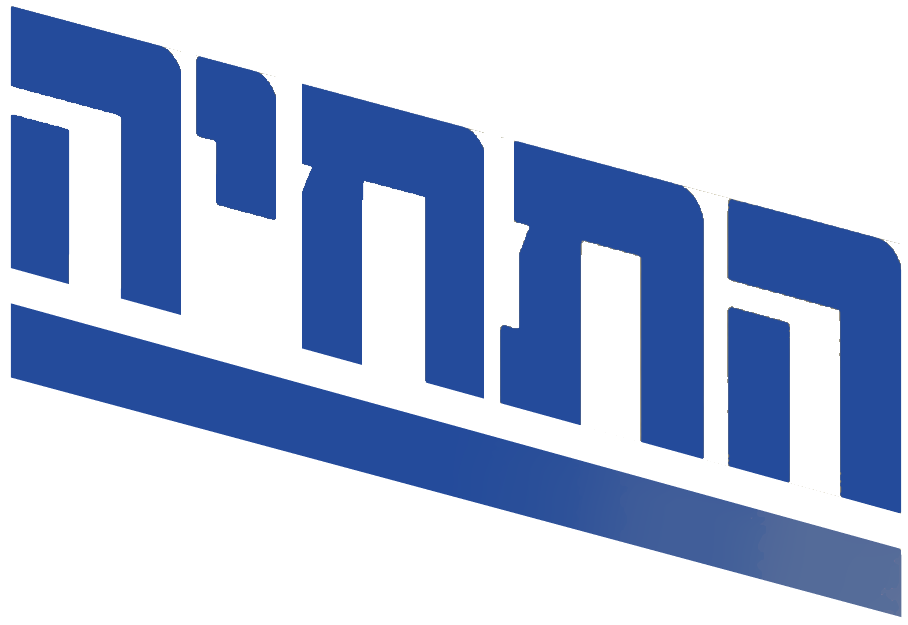
- Leader: Geula Cohen; Yuval Ne'eman
- Founded: 1979
- Dissolved: 1992
- Split from: Herut
- Merged into: Likud
- Ideology: Ultranationalism; Settler interests Revisionist Zionism; Greater Israel
- Political position: Right-wing to far-right
- Most MKs: 5 (1984)

Election symbol
- ת

Tehiya (Hebrew: תחיה, lit. 'Revival'), originally known as Banai (בנא״י, an abbreviation for Land of Israel Loyalists' Alliance (Note: ברית נאמני ארץ ישראל, Brit Na'amnei Eretz Yisrael)), then Tehiya-Bnai (תחייה־בנא״י), was an ultranationalist political party in Israel. The party existed from 1979 until 1992. In the eyes of many, Tehiya was identified with Geula Cohen, who founded the party and headed it throughout its existence.

== Background ==
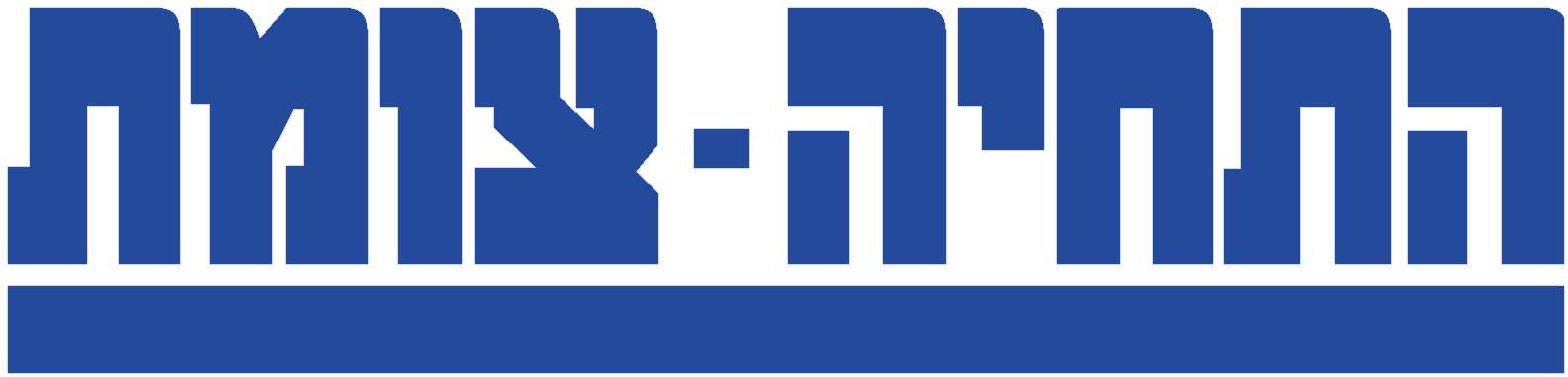
Tehiya-Tzomet Alliance Logo, 1984

The party was formed in 1979 during the term of the ninth Knesset, when Geula Cohen and Moshe Shamir broke away from Herut in response to the Camp David Treaty between Egypt and Israel, particularly the return of the Sinai Peninsula to Egypt, and the eviction of its Israeli settlers.

Tehiya was strongly affiliated with the extra-parliamentary movement of Gush Emunim, and included prominent members of Israeli settlements in the West Bank and Gaza such as Hanan Porat (later to be a member of the Knesset for the National Religious Party and the National Union) and Elyakim Haetzni. Another founder and prominent member was the physicist Yuval Neeman.

In its first electoral test, the 1981 legislative election, Tehiya picked up three seats. Despite their previous difference of opinion, they were included in Menachem Begin's coalition government alongside Likud, the National Religious Party, Agudat Israel, Tami and Telem. Although Cohen did not take a ministerial position, Neeman became Minister of Science and Development.

For the 1984 elections, Tehiya ran in an alliance with the moshav-based Tzomet party, led by Rafael Eitan. The alliance became the third largest party in the Knesset after the Alignment and Likud, albeit with only five seats. However, they refused to participate in the national unity government of Shimon Peres and Yitzhak Shamir, which included the Alignment, Likud, the National Religious Party, Agudat Israel, Shas, Morasha, Shinui and Ometz. Although the two parties officially merged in 1986, Tzomet left the alliance the following year, due to conflicts between Eitan and Cohen.

Tehiya was reduced to three seats in the 1988 legislative election, and was again excluded from Shamir's national unity government. However, when the Alignment left the coalition in 1990, Tehiya were invited into a new narrow right-wing government which included Likud, the National Religious Party, Shas, Agudat Israel, Degel HaTorah, the New Liberal Party. Although Cohen again declined a ministerial position, Neeman was appointed Minister of Energy and Infrastructure and Minister of Science and Technology. Despite its late entry to the government, the party pulled out of the coalition on 21 January 1992 in protest over Yitzhak Shamir's participation in the Madrid conference, which forced the government to hold new elections.

Leading up to the 1992 legislative election, Tehiya began to feel the weight of Tzomet's growing popularity. Until a month before the election, the two parties had been at roughly the same level in the opinion polls. Both parties were competing for the same secular right-wing electorate. By the beginning of June, Tzomet began to surge in polls, having attracted many former Likud voters who deserted the party over the Madrid conference. Nevertheless, Tehiya were still predicted to win around three seats. It came as a shock to the party when it only won 1.22% of the votes, and failed to cross the raised electoral threshold of 1.5%. Meanwhile, Tzomet won eight seats, becoming the fourth-largest party. Ironically, Tehiya's support for raising the threshold from 1% to 1.5% led to their elimination from the Knesset.

Party members blamed the poor result on the early election date, claiming that they were ill-prepared. Geula Cohen blamed the defeat on 'personality cult' parties, singling out Tzomet, Moledet, and Moshe Levinger's small list that failed to cross the threshold.

Tehiya subsequently disappeared, with Cohen joining Likud that year. Tzomet themselves would forge an electoral alliance with the Likud in 1996, before it lost its electorate to another ultranationalist party, the National Union.

Tehiya fronted a number of controversial positions in its time, some of which were adopted by the mainstream; most notably, the Jerusalem Law, which was proposed by the party and enacted on 30 July 1980 establishing Jerusalem as the capital of the State of Israel.

== Structure ==
The structure of Tehiya was based on a military model due to Gideon Altshuler, former head of an IDF brigade being made Secretary General, and Shmuel Gordan, a former Lieutenant Colonel, being made head of organization. The party only allowed Jewish members.

== Election results ==
Election	Leader	Votes	%	Seats	+/–	Status
1981	Yuval Ne'eman	44,700	2.31 (#7)	3 / 120	▲1	Coalition
1984	Yuval Ne'eman	With Tzomet		4 / 120	▲1	Opposition
1988	Yuval Ne'eman	45,489	1.99 (#10)	3 / 120	▼1	Opposition (1988–1990)
1988	Yuval Ne'eman	45,489	1.99 (#10)	3 / 120	▼1	Coalition(1990–1992)
1992	Yuval Ne'eman	31,957	1.22 (#11)	0 / 120	▼3	Extraparliamentary

== Knesset members ==
Knesset (MKs)	Knesset members
9th (2)	Geula Cohen, Moshe Shamir
10th (3)	Geula Cohen, Yuval Neeman, Hanan Porat (replaced by Zvi Shiloah)
11th (5 −1)	Geula Cohen, Yuval Neeman, Gershon Shafat, Eliezer Waldman − Rafael Eitan (to Tzomet)
12th (3)	Geula Cohen, Yuval Neeman (replaced by Elyakim Haetzni), Eliezer Waldman (replaced by Gershon Shafat)

== Election platform ==
The Tehiya platform at the 1988 elections included:

- Jewish sovereignty over the Sinai Peninsula, West Bank, and Gaza Strip.
- Increasing the Jewish population in all parts of Jerusalem's Old City.
- Strengthening the Israel Defense Forces through advanced technology and strict penalties for refusal to serve.
- Expanding Israeli settlements in the West Bank and Gaza, including creating a dedicated police force.
- Clemency for Jews convicted of crimes driven by "security distress."
- Limiting peace agreements to Arab states that accept Jewish control over all of the Land of Israel.
- Declaring Jordan as the Palestinian state and opposing any Palestinian state west of the Jordan River.
- Ending Palestinian access to the High Court of Justice.
- Enforcing the death penalty for severe acts of violence by Palestinians.
- Allowing soldiers to use lethal force against stone throwers.
- Imposing collective punishments on Palestinians.
- Building wide access roads through the historic centers of Palestinian cities.
