= Status of territories occupied by Israel in 1967 =

Status of the Gaza Strip, the West Bank, the Golan Heights, and the Sinai Peninsula

During the 1967 Six-Day War, Israel occupied the Gaza Strip, the West Bank, the Golan Heights, and the Sinai Peninsula. The Sinai Peninsula was returned to full sovereignty of Egypt in 1982 as a result of the Egypt–Israel peace treaty. The United Nations Security Council and the International Court of Justice (ICJ) both describe the West Bank and Western Golan Heights as "occupied territory" under international law, and the Supreme Court of Israel describes them as held "in belligerent occupation", however Israel's government calls the West Bank "disputed" rather than "occupied" and argues that since Israel's unilateral disengagement plan of 2005, it does not militarily occupy the Gaza Strip, a statement rejected by the United Nations Human Rights Council and Human Rights Watch because Israel continues to maintain control of its airspace, waters and most of its borders.

In July 2024, the ICJ concluded that Israel's occupation of Palestinian territories violated international law and that Israel should cease settlement activity in the West Bank and East Jerusalem and end its illegal occupation of these areas and the Gaza Strip as soon as possible.

== Views ==
=== Occupied territories ===
In early 2023, the ICJ accepted a request from the UN for an advisory opinion on the legal consequences arising from the policies and practices of Israel in the occupied Palestinian territory including East Jerusalem. The court published its opinion in July 2024. The court declared in its landmark opinion that the Israel's occupation of Palestinian territories violated international law, adding that Israel should cease settlement activity in the West Bank and East Jerusalem and end its "illegal" occupation of these areas and the Gaza Strip as soon as possible.

In their decisions on the Israeli West Bank barrier, the International Court of Justice and Supreme Court of Israel have both ruled that the West Bank is occupied. The US State Department also considered the West Bank and Gaza Strip occupied prior to Israel's 2005 disengagement from Gaza.

The ICJ outlined the legal rationale for the supporters of this view in its advisory opinion of 9 July 2004. It noted:

...under customary international law as reflected (...) in Article 42 of the Regulations Respecting the Laws and Customs of War on Land annexed to the Fourth Hague Convention of 18 October 1907 (hereinafter “the Hague Regulations of 1907”), territory is considered occupied when it is actually placed under the authority of the hostile army, and the occupation extends only to the territory where such authority has been established and can be exercised. The territories situated between the Green Line (see paragraph 72 above) and the former eastern boundary of Palestine under the Mandate were occupied by Israel in 1967 during the armed conflict between Israel and Jordan. Under customary international law, these were therefore occupied territories in which Israel had the status of occupying Power. Subsequent events in these territories, as described in paragraphs 75 to 77 above, have done nothing to alter this situation. All these territories (including East Jerusalem) remain occupied territories and Israel has continued to have the status of occupying Power.

On the application of the Fourth Geneva Convention, the Court noted:

...for the purpose of determining the scope of application of the Fourth Geneva

Convention, it should be recalled that under common Article 2 of the four Conventions of 12 August 1949:

“In addition to the provisions which shall be implemented in peacetime, the present Convention shall apply to all cases of declared war or of any other armed conflict which may arise between two or more of the High Contracting Parties, even if the state of war is not recognized by one of them.

The Convention shall also apply to all cases of partial or total occupation of the territory of a High Contracting Party, even if the said occupation meets with no armed resistance."

(...) the Court notes that, according to the first paragraph of Article 2 of the Fourth Geneva Convention, that Convention is applicable when two conditions are fulfilled: that there exists an armed conflict (whether or not a state of war has been recognized); and that the conflict has arisen between two contracting parties. (...) The object of the second paragraph of Article 2 is not to restrict the scope of application of the Convention, as defined by the first paragraph, by excluding therefrom territories not falling under the sovereignty of one of the contracting parties. It is directed simply to making it clear that, even if occupation effected during the conflict met no armed resistance, the Convention is still applicable.

In its June 2005 ruling upholding the constitutionality of the Gaza disengagement, the Israeli High Court determined that "Judea and Samaria [West Bank] and the Gaza area are lands seized during warfare, and are not part of Israel."

=== Disputed territories ===
Israel's position that the West Bank and the Gaza Strip are disputed territories took time to formulate.

The 1948 Israeli Declaration of Independence did not declare set borders. David Ben-Gurion, soon to become Israel's first Prime Minister, preferred that they be determined by the realities of conflict, and peace agreements with Israel's neighbors. This complicates later application of the definition of occupation, since occupation is only applicable to territory outside the occupant's own borders.

After the Six-Day War, Israel's Attorney General Meir Shamgar adopted a legal argument first articulated in 1968 by law professor and diplomat Yehuda Zvi Blum on the juridical status of Judea and Samaria (i.e. the West Bank). The argument concluded that valid title to the territories did not arise from either the 1948 attacks by Egypt and the Kingdom of Transjordan (contrary to Article 2(4) of the UN Charter), or any of the armistice agreements of 1949, or by Jordan's 1950 purported annexation of the West Bank. As a result, Blum concluded, no other nation (such as Jordan) had better title to the territories than Israel.

In 2004, the Israeli Supreme Court, in its ruling on the legality of the West Bank barrier, stated that Israel held the West Bank in "belligerent occupation" and, in 2005, made the same determination with regard to the Gaza Strip.

In 2012, the Israeli cabinet created a three-member advisory committee to investigate the legal status of unauthorized West Bank settlements. The ensuing report, called the Levy Report, concluded that "the classical laws of 'occupation' as set out in the relevant international conventions cannot be considered applicable to the unique and sui generis historic and legal circumstances of Israel’s presence in [the West Bank]", and "Israel has had every right to claim sovereignty over these territories", but opted instead "to adopt a pragmatic approach in order to enable peace negotiations". Furthermore, Israel allows Israelis "to voluntarily establish their residence in the territory [...], subject to [...] the outcome of the diplomatic negotiations".

The arguments in favor of Israel's official position—that the territories should be called disputed, rather than occupied—is explained by the Jerusalem Center for Public Affairs and Israeli government websites as outlined below.

- Beginning of occupation
  - According to Article 2 of the Fourth Geneva Convention, only "the territory of a High Contracting Party" can be "occupied" by another High Contracting (i.e., legitimate and recognized sovereign) party. This does not apply to the West Bank and Gaza Strip, since they had never been the legal territories of any High Contracting Party prior to the Six-Day War. (Although Jordan purportedly annexed the West Bank in 1950, this was only recognized by two countries, so it did not confer sovereign title onto Jordan.)
    - As a counterpoint, it can be argued that the Palestinian right to self-determination implies the Palestinian people were sovereign of West Bank and Gaza prior to 1967.
  - No borders have been established or recognized by the parties. Armistice lines do not establish borders, and the 1949 Armistice Agreements in particular specifically stated (at Arab insistence) that they were not creating permanent or de jure borders.
- End of occupation
  - Even if the Fourth Geneva Convention had applied at one point, it certainly did not apply once the Israel transferred governmental powers to the Palestinian Authority in accordance with the 1993–1995 Oslo Accords, since Article 6 of the convention states that the Occupying Power would only be bound to its terms "to the extent that such Power exercises the functions of government in such territory....".
  - The Jerusalem Center for Public Affairs has argued that not only have the Oslo Accords diminished the extent of the occupation, but that, since the remaining Israeli presence is by agreement, "that presence should no longer be viewed as an occupation".
    - By contrast, Hanne Cuyckens argues that Israel still occupies the West Bank, because the Palestinian Authority (unlike the Hamas government in Gaza) is subjected to Israeli authority. Cuyckens states it is possible for an occupying power to delegate some power to local authorities in a context of a hierarchical relationship where the occupying power retains control over the local authorities.
- Comparative strength of claim to title
  - Israel took control of the West Bank as a result of a defensive war imposed upon it in 1967. Former State Department Legal Advisor Stephen Schwebel, who later headed the International Court of Justice in the Hague, wrote in 1970 regarding Israel's case: "Where the prior holder of territory had seized that territory unlawfully, the state which subsequently takes that territory in the lawful exercise of self-defense has, against that prior holder, better title."
    - Critics of this rationale argue that there is dispute whether Israel's 1967 war was defensive or offensive, and that there is nothing in the Geneva Convention which would make it inapplicable to defensive wars.
  - At the December 1948 Jericho Conference, Palestinian leadership accepted Jordanian rule. Later, the 1964 Palestine National Charter, in effect at the time of the Six-Day War, stated in Article 24 that the PLO "does not exercise any territorial sovereignty over the West Bank [or] the Gaza Strip".
- International recognition
  - United National Security Council Resolutions 242 (1967) and 338 (1973) are founded upon international recognition of the need for agreement and negotiations between the parties, including the final disposition of several issues, including allocation of the territories. This was the foundation for the 1991 Madrid Conference, and the Oslo Accords which followed.

Another argument in favor of the "disputed territories" classification is the widely acknowledged doctrine of customary international law, called uti possidetis juris, that provides a clear guideline for the borders of newly created states formed out of territories that previously lacked independence or sovereignty. It dictates that states "presumptively inherit the [...] administrative borders that they held at the time of independence." According to Malcolm Shaw, this doctrine even applies when it conflicts with the principle of self-determination. The application of this doctrine to the borders of Israel upon its founding was prevented by the 1948 Arab–Israeli War.

Israel has been criticized for using the term "disputed territories" abroad for public relations purposes, but using the term "belligerent occupation" to justify military control of the territories in the Israeli Supreme Court.

Legal classification of the territories has an impact on the fulfillment of covenants, such as the international covenants that Israel is a signatory to that concern a nation's territory. For example, the International Covenant on Civil and Political Rights (ICCPR), which Israel is a signatory to, is applied to East Jerusalem, but not the West Bank.

== Current status by territory ==
=== Gaza Strip ===
Following the 1967 war, in which the Israeli army occupied the West Bank and Gaza Strip, a military administration over the Palestinian population was put in place. In 1993, Israel gave autonomy to the people of Gaza and completely disengaged from Gaza in 2005. However, in 2007, Israel put a blockade on the Gaza Strip over what it viewed as security concerns. Israel asserts that since the disengagement of Israel from Gaza in 2005, Israel no longer occupies the Gaza Strip. As Israel retained control of Gaza's airspace and coastline, as of 2012 it continued to be designated as an occupying power in the Gaza Strip by the United Nations Security Council, the United Nations General Assembly and some countries and various human rights organizations.

=== Golan Heights ===
The Golan was under military administration until the Knesset passed the Golan Heights Law in 1981, which applied Israeli law to the territory; a move that has been described as an annexation. In response, the United Nations Security Council unanimously passed UNSC Resolution 497 which condemned the Israeli actions to change the status of the territory declaring them "null and void and without international legal effect", and that the Golan remained an occupied territory. As of 2026, the United States and Colombia are the only states to recognize the Golan Heights as Israeli sovereign territory, while the rest of the international community continues to consider the territory Syrian held under Israeli military occupation.

=== West Bank ===
While the international community considers the West Bank to be a territory held by Israel under military occupation, it is regarded by Israeli authorities as one of its administrative regions; the Israeli government term for the district encompassing Israeli administratively controlled Jewish-majority civilian areas of Area C of the West Bank, excluding East Jerusalem, is Judea and Samaria Area.

==== East Jerusalem ====
East Jerusalem had been occupied by Israel in 1967 and was effectively annexed by Israel in 1980, an act internationally condemned. On 27–28 June 1967, East Jerusalem was integrated into Jerusalem by extension of its municipal borders and was placed under the civil law, jurisdiction and administration of the State of Israel. In a unanimous General Assembly resolution, the UN declared the measures trying to change the status of the city invalid.

The Jerusalem Waqf, a council of 18 members appointed by Jordan, acts as custodian of the Muslim holy sites in East Jerusalem, including the Temple Mount / Haram Al-Sharif.

=== Non-member observer state status of Palestine ===
On Thursday, November 29, 2012, in a 138–9 vote (with 41 abstaining) General Assembly resolution 67/19 passed, upgrading Palestine to "non-member observer state" status in the United Nations. The new status equates Palestine's with that of the Holy See. The change in status was described by The Independent as "de facto recognition of the sovereign State of Palestine". Voting "no" were Canada, the Czech Republic, Israel, the Marshall Islands, Micronesia, Nauru, Palau, Panama and the United States.

The vote was a historic benchmark for the partially recognised State of Palestine and its citizens, whilst it was a diplomatic setback for Israel and the United States. Status as an observer state in the UN allows the State of Palestine to join treaties and specialised UN agencies, the Law of the Seas treaty, and the International Criminal Court. It permits Palestine to pursue legal rights over its territorial waters and air space as a sovereign state recognised by the UN, and allows the Palestinian people the right to sue for sovereignty over their rightful territory in the International Court of Justice and to bring 'crimes against humanity' and war-crimes charges against Israel in the International Criminal Court, including that of unlawfully occupying the territory of State of Palestine.

After the resolution passed, the UN permitted Palestine to title its representative office to the UN as "The Permanent Observer Mission of the State of Palestine to the United Nations", seen by many as a reflection of the UN's de facto position of recognising the State of Palestine's sovereignty under international law, and Palestine re-titled its name accordingly on postal stamps, official documents and passports. The Palestinian authorities instructed its diplomats to officially represent the "State of Palestine", as opposed to the "Palestine National Authority". Additionally, on 17 December 2012, UN Chief of Protocol Yeocheol Yoon decided that "the designation of 'State of Palestine' shall be used by the Secretariat in all official United Nations documents", recognising it as an independent nation.

== Israeli judicial decisions ==
In two cases decided shortly after independence, in the Shimshon and Stampfer cases, the Supreme Court of Israel held that the fundamental rules of international law accepted as binding by all "civilized" nations were incorporated in the domestic legal system of Israel. The Nuremberg Military Tribunal determined that the articles annexed to the Hague IV Convention of 1907 were customary law that had been recognized by all civilized nations. In the past, the Supreme Court has argued that the Geneva Convention insofar as it is not supported by domestic legislation "does not bind this Court, its enforcement being a matter for the states which are parties to the Convention". They ruled that "Conventional international law does not become part of Israeli law through automatic incorporation, but only if it is adopted or combined with Israeli law by enactment of primary or subsidiary legislation from which it derives its force". However, in the same decision the Court ruled that the Fourth Hague Convention rules governing belligerent occupation did apply, since those were recognized as customary international law.

The Israeli High Court of Justice determined in the 1979 Elon Moreh case that the area in question was under occupation and that accordingly only the military commander of the area may requisition land according to Article 52 of the Regulations annexed to the Hague IV Convention. Military necessity had been an after-thought in planning portions of the Elon Moreh settlement. That situation did not fulfill the precise strictures laid down in the articles of the Hague Convention, so the Court ruled the requisition order had been invalid and illegal. In recent decades, the government of Israel has argued before the Supreme Court of Israel that its authority in the territories is based on the international law of "belligerent occupation", in particular the Hague Conventions. The court has confirmed this interpretation many times, for example in its 2004 and 2005 rulings on the separation fence.

In its June 2005 ruling upholding the constitutionality of the Gaza disengagement, the Court determined that "Judea and Samaria" [West Bank] and the Gaza area are lands seized during warfare, and are not part of Israel:

The Judea and Samaria areas are held by the State of Israel in belligerent occupation. The long arm of the state in the area is the military commander. He is not the sovereign in the territory held in belligerent occupation (see The Beit Sourik Case, at p. 832). His power is granted him by public international law regarding belligerent occupation. The legal meaning of this view is twofold: first, Israeli law does not apply in these areas. They have not been "annexed" to Israel. Second, the legal regime which applies in these areas is determined by public international law regarding belligerent occupation (see HCJ 1661/05 The Gaza Coast Regional Council v. The Knesset et al. (yet unpublished, paragraph 3 of the opinion of the Court; hereinafter – The Gaza Coast Regional Council Case). In the center of this public international law stand the Regulations Concerning the Laws and Customs of War on Land, The Hague, 18 October 1907 (hereinafter – The Hague Regulations). These regulations are a reflection of customary international law. The law of belligerent occupation is also laid out in IV Geneva Convention Relative to the Protection of Civilian Persons in Time of War 1949 (hereinafter – the Fourth Geneva Convention).

== Range of Israeli legal and political views ==
Soon after the 1967 war, Israel issued a military order stating that the Geneva Conventions applied to the recently occupied territories, but this order was rescinded a few months later. For a number of years, Israel argued on various grounds that the Geneva Conventions do not apply. One is the Missing Reversioner theory, which argued that the Geneva Conventions apply only to the sovereign territory of a High Contracting Party, and therefore do not apply since Jordan never exercised sovereignty over the region. However, almost the entire international community refers to the situation as occupation. The application of Geneva Convention to Occupied Palestinian Territories was further upheld by International Court of Justice, UN General Assembly, UN Security Council and the Israeli Supreme Court.

In cases before the Israeli High Court of Justice the government itself has agreed that the military commander's authority is anchored in the Fourth Geneva Convention Relative to the Protection of Civilian Persons in Time of War, and that the humanitarian rules of the Fourth Geneva Convention apply. The Israeli Minister of Foreign Affairs stated that the Supreme Court of Israel has ruled that the Fourth Geneva Convention and certain parts of Additional Protocol I reflect customary international law that is applicable in the occupied territories. Gershom Gorenberg has written that the Israeli government knew at the outset that it was violating the Geneva Convention by creating civilian settlements in the territories under IDF administration. He explained that as the legal counsel of the Foreign Ministry, Theodor Meron was the Israeli government's expert on international law. On September 16, 1967, Meron wrote a top secret memo to Mr. Adi Yafeh, Political Secretary of the Prime Minister regarding "Settlement in the Administered Territories" which said "My conclusion is that civilian settlement in the Administered territories contravenes the explicit provisions of the Fourth Geneva Convention." Moshe Dayan authored a secret memo in 1968 proposing massive settlement in the territories which said “Settling Israelis in administered territory, as is known, contravenes international conventions, but there is nothing essentially new about that.”

The commission of experts headed by the retired Israeli Supreme Court Judge Edmond Levy issued on July 9, 2012 its report on the status of the territories conquered by Israel in 1967. The commission concluded that the Israeli control over those territories is not an occupation in the legal sense, and that the Israeli settlements in those territories do not contravene international law.

== See also ==
- International law and the Arab–Israeli conflict
- Legality of Israeli settlements
- Regulation Law
- West Bank Areas in the Oslo II Accord

== Notes ==
1. DISPUTED TERRITORIES- Forgotten Facts About the West Bank and Gaza Strip, Israeli Ministry of Foreign Affairs website, February 1, 2003. Retrieved July 29, 2024.
2. International Law and the Arab-Israeli Conflict Extracts from "Israel and Palestine – Assault on the Law of Nations" by Julius Stone, Ed: Ian Lacey, Second edition, Australia/Israel & Jewish Affairs Council website, 2003. Retrieved September 29, 2005.
3. Inaccurate Terms in Coverage of Bush Statement, Committee for Accuracy in Middle East Reporting in America website, April 18, 2004. Retrieved September 29, 2005.
4. Jewish Settlements and the Media, Committee for Accuracy in Middle East Reporting in America website, October 5, 2001. Retrieved February 5, 2006.
5. "Occupied Territories" to "Disputed Territories" by Dore Gold, Jerusalem Center for Public Affairs, January 16, 2002. Retrieved September 29, 2005.
6. Forgotten Facts About the West Bank and Gaza Strip, Israeli Ministry of Foreign Affairs website, February 1, 2003. Retrieved September 28, 2005.
