= Alan Baker (diplomat) =

Israeli lawyer and diplomat

Alan Baker (Hebrew: אלן בייקר; born 1947) is an Israeli expert in international law and former ambassador of the state of Israel to Canada. He is the director of the Institute for Contemporary Affairs at the Jerusalem Center for Public Affairs and a former partner in the Tel Aviv law firm of Moshe, Bloomfield, Kobo, Baker & Co. He was a military prosecutor and senior legal adviser in the Israel Defense Forces (IDF) and represented the Ministry of Defense at international conferences, and then joined the Foreign Ministry as legal adviser. He participated in the negotiation and drafting of agreements and peace treaties with Egypt, Jordan, Lebanon and the Palestinians. In January 2012 he was appointed by Prime Minister Benyamin Netanyahu to the three member committee chaired by former Justice Edmund Levy to examine the legal aspects of land ownership in the West Bank. The committee's report, referred to as Levy Report, was published by the Israeli government in Hebrew in July 2012.

== Life and career ==
Baker was born to a traditional Jewish family in the UK. He studied law at University College London, where he received his Bachelor of Laws in 1969, when the family emigrated to Israel, and has a Master of Laws in international law from the Hebrew University of Jerusalem (1972). He was admitted to the Israel Bar Association in 1977.

Baker spent the bulk of his professional career working in different capacities for Israel. Two years after graduating from the Hebrew University of Jerusalem, Baker became a Military Prosecutor and Senior Legal Officer in the International Law Branch of the Military Advocate General's Unit. Most of Baker's dealings during this time revolved around international humanitarian law, human rights law, and the law of armed conflict.

Serving in this capacity until 1979, Baker returned to public service in 1985 where he was seconded by the government of Israel to the United Nations in New York serving as a senior legal adviser. This role, which lasted until 1988, saw Baker dealing directly with specialized agencies and bodies within the UN system such as the Administrative Tribunal.

In 1995, Baker also served as Israel's representative to the international negotiations of the International Criminal Court (ICC) as well as the Rome Diplomatic Conference in 1998.

Beginning in 1974, over the decades Baker has engaged in direct negotiations with Egypt, Jordan, Lebanon, and the Palestinians. Accordingly, Baker's role during these meeting largely focused on the fields of international law. More specifically, Baker contributed to discussions on international humanitarian law, crime prevention, disarmament, aviation law, and water resources. Moreover, he has represented Israel at international conferences and negotiations, including Israel's legal presentation to the International Court of Justice (ICJ) on the issue of Israel's security barrier in 2004. Accordingly, among Baker's most recent publications concerns UNWRA role in perpetuating refugeedom, UNESCO's undermining of Jewish religious heritage, and the implications of the Balfour Declaration 100 years since its signing.

From 1996 to 2004, he was legal adviser and deputy director-general of Israel's Ministry of Foreign Affairs, and served as Israel's ambassador to Canada from 2004 to 2008. In 2008, Alan Baker said he feared Canadian Muslims might impact Canada's foreign policy. He said that the Canadian Muslims might push their values onto Canadians, which "wouldn't gel with Canadian values of mutual respect." He also criticised a Muslim Member of Parliament, Omar Alghabra and said that "Muslim activists" had prevented him from speaking. Bob Rae of the Liberal party called the comments inappropriate and inaccurate and Alghabra described them as "generalizing" and "divisive." The Canadian Arab Federation accused Baker of sowing division amongst Canadians. An editorial in the Toronto Star asserted that Israeli diplomats should not "interfere in Canadian affairs". He retired from government service in February 2009 and joined the Tel Aviv law firm of Moshe, Bloomfield, Kobo, Baker & Co. In 2010 he took up the post of Director of the Institute for Contemporary Affairs at the Jerusalem Center for Public Affairs. At this institution, Baker also oversees the Global Law Forum. His publications range from the legal dimensions of the Israeli-Palestinian Conflict to the interaction between international organizations and Israel.

Baker is a member of the Israel Bar, the International Law Association, the International Institute of Humanitarian Law, the International Association of Jewish Lawyers and Jurists, and serves as a member of Israel's panel of arbitrators at the Permanent Court of Arbitration.

== Opinions ==
On the question of legality of Israeli settlements in the occupied territories, Baker outlined Israel's interpretation of Article 49 of the Fourth Geneva Convention in a 2003 interview:

The prohibition concerning the transfer of the occupying power's nationals to the occupied territory refers to forcible transfers, along the lines of what the Nazis did. Article 49 was drafted after World War II and is aimed at preventing the kind of mass population transfers the Germans carried out to alter the demographic character of the territories they occupied. Israel's policies ban forcible population transfers, but do sanction voluntary ones; Israel has refrained from expropriating private land; the scale of the transfers is too small to affect the territory's character; and, what is most important, the transfers are not permanent.

Baker explained the reference to the continued Israeli presence in the West Bank pursuant to the Oslo accords between the PLO and Israel in the interview as follows, stating:

The legal claim today and the arguments rest on the Oslo accords. It was resolved - and the Palestinians agreed - that the settlements' fate would be determined in a future peace agreement. After we signed those accords, which are still legally in force, we are no longer an occupying power, but we are instead present in the territories with their consent and subject to the outcome of negotiations.

And he explains the status of Israeli residents of settlements in the West Bank,

I live beyond the Green Line but my home is not registered under my ownership with the Israel Lands Administration, which is the case for all the settlements. Instead, I have a long-term rental agreement that is contingent on any future peace agreement. This is the condition by which all settlers must abide. Whether or not they are aware of or agree to this situation, they have no permanent resident status and are powerless to change their status or the land's ownership.

In January 2012 Baker was appointed by Prime Minister Netanyahu to serve on a three-member government committee to "examine real estate issues in the West Bank". The committee's report published in July 2012, usually referred to as Levy Report, recommends procedures for ensuring that settlement construction is carried out legally, and comes to the conclusion that Israel's presence in the West Bank is not occupation, and that the Israeli settlements are legal under international law. The Report provided legal backing for the Israeli right's annexation plans, and is mentioned in Naftali Bennett's 2019 political platform.

== Selected publications ==
- "The Use of Children in Armed Conflict", Justice, Vol 26, Winter 2000 (together with Harel Ben-Ari).
- "Legal and Tactical Dilemmas Inherent in Fighting Terror: Experience of the Israeli Army in Jenin and Bethlehem (April–May 2002)", US Naval War College Yearbook, 2003.
- "The question of Palestinian recognition of Israel as a Jewish state," Haaretz, May 3, 2009.
- "Just what did Goldstone expect?,"The Jerusalem Post, Oct. 18, 2009.
- "A Paradox of Peacemaking: How Fayyad's Unilateral Statehood Plan Undermines the Legal Foundations of Israeli-Palestinian Diplomacy," Jerusalem Centre for Public Affairs, No. 574, November 2009.
- "Reasons not to join the International Criminal Court in The Hague," Jerusalem Center for Public Affairs, January 10, 2010.
- "The Fallacy of the “1967 Borders – No Such Borders Ever Existed," Jerusalem Center for Public Affairs, Vol. 10, No. 17, December 21, 2010.
- "The Fatah-Hamas Reconciliation - The Gilad Schalit Test," The Jerusalem Post, May 23, 2011.
- "The Proposed General Assembly Resolution to Recognize a Palestinian State 'within 1967 Borders' – An Illegal Action," Letter to the UN Secretary General.
- "The Gaza Flotillas to Come: Some Ground Rules before Setting Out," Jerusalem Center for Public Affairs, Vol. 11, No. 3, June 5, 2011.
- "The Correct Guide for Building Peace by Barack Obama," Ynet, September 22, 2011.
- "Manipulation and Deception: The Anti-Israel "BDS" Campaign (Boycott, Divestment, and Sanctions)," Jerusalem Center for Public Affairs, Vol. 12, No. 2, March 19, 2012.
- "The opening of a Spanish consulate in Gaza" The Jerusalem Post, April 22, 2013.
- "The EU's glaring hypocrisy regarding Israel" Haaretz, July 31, 2013.
- "International humanitarian law, ICRC and Israel's status in the Territories," International Review of the Red Cross, 94, No. 886, Winter 2013.
- "Is the condemnation by the United Nations secretary-general genuine or politically biased?" The Jerusalem Post, August 6, 2015.
- "Israel-Diaspora relations at a crossroads" The Jerusalem Post, November 23, 2015.
