= Israeli outpost =

Unauthorized Israeli settlements in the West Bank

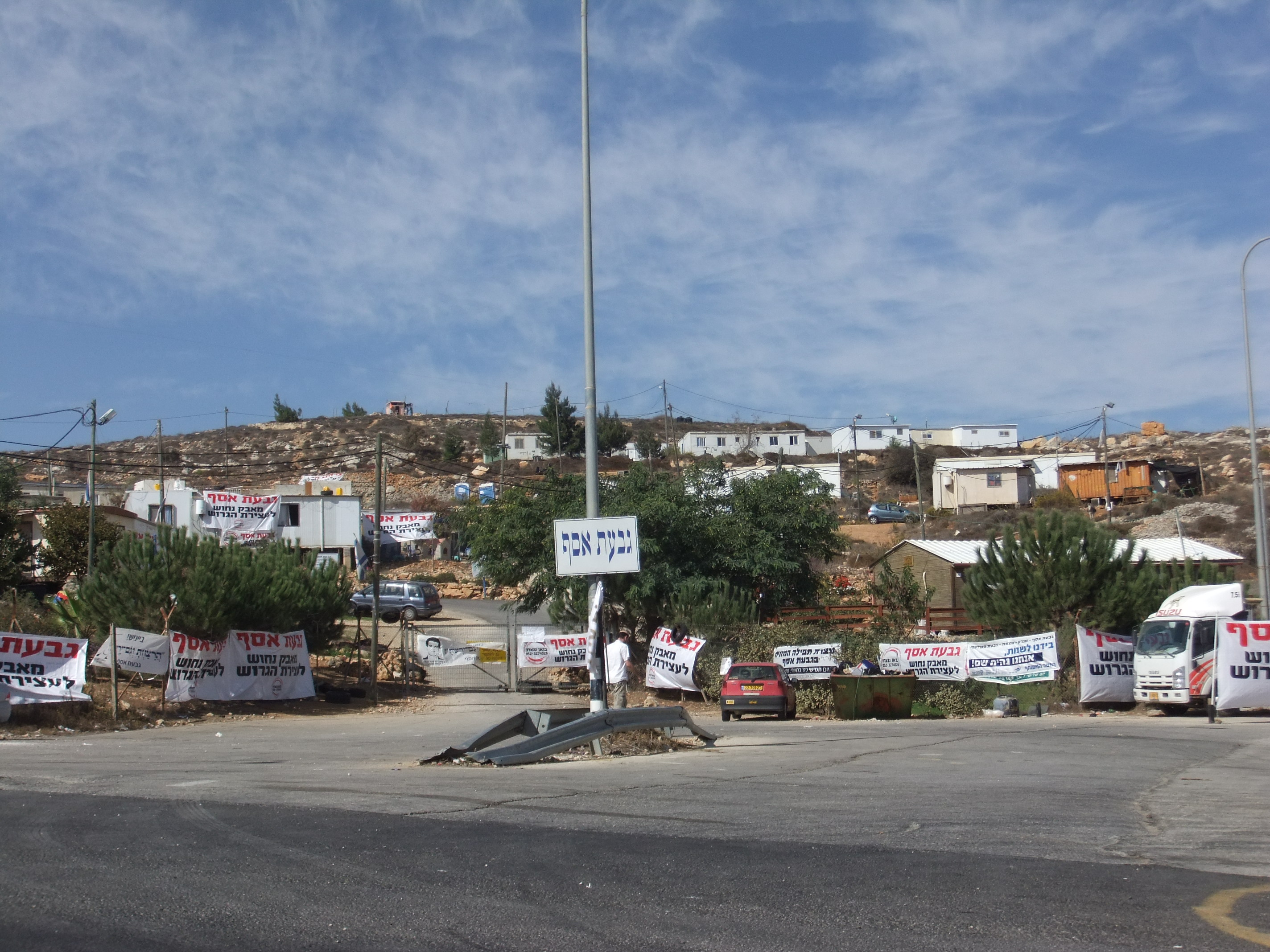
The outpost Giv'at Asaf is located in the West Bank.

In Israeli law, an outpost (Hebrew: מאחז, romanized: Ma'ahaz, lit. 'a handhold') is an unauthorized or illegal Israeli settlement within the West Bank, constructed without the required authorization from the Israeli government in contravention of Israeli statutes regulating planning and construction. In Israeli law, outposts are distinguished from settlements authorized by the Israeli government. This distinction between illegal outposts and "legal" settlements is not endorsed by international law, which considers both a violation of the norms, governing belligerent occupations, applicable to the Israeli-occupied West Bank.

Outposts appeared after the 1993 Oslo I Accord, when the Israeli government made commitments to freeze the building of new settlements. Although outposts were not officially supported by the government, Israeli public authorities and other government bodies played a major role in establishing and developing them, according to the 2005 Sasson Report, commissioned by then Prime Minister Ariel Sharon. Outposts differ from neighborhoods in that they are built at a substantial distance from authorized settlements, while neighborhoods are attached to an existing settlement.

In July 2002, the Israeli government acknowledged that 69 outposts had been established since 1996. A number of them, most unpopulated, have been removed afterwards. Currently, some hundred outposts exist. The majority of them, some 70 in 2002, belong to the Amana movement.

In 2012, ten unauthorized outposts were retroactively legalised by the Israeli government under Prime Minister Benyamin Netanyahu, according to the Israeli NGO Peace Now, by redesignating them as a neighbourhood of nearby settlements.

Outposts often are provided with security by the Israel Defense Forces.

== Background ==
In 1993, the Rabin Government made commitments to freeze the building of new settlements. After then, however, settlers built new settlements without governmental decision, but often with the involvement of Israeli public authorities and other government bodies and government ministries, such as the Ministry of Housing and Construction, the Settlement Division of the World Zionist Organization and the Israeli Civil Administration. The Sasson Report, commissioned by then Prime Minister Ariel Sharon found that the proliferation of outposts was a continuation of the Israeli settlement enterprise and makes it clear that “an unauthorized outpost is not a “semi legal” outpost. Unauthorized is illegal.”

== Characteristics of an outpost ==
The population of outposts generally numbers between a few and some 400 people and they are usually composed of modular homes, such as caravans. However, they can also be further developed, having more permanent housing as well as "paved roads, bus stops, synagogues and playgrounds."

According to the 2005 Sasson Report, there are four principal characteristics of an unauthorized outpost:

1. There was no government decision to establish it, and in any case no authorized political echelon approved its establishment.
2. The outpost was established with no legal planning status. Meaning, with no valid detailed plan governing the area it was established upon, which can support a building permit.
3. An unauthorized outpost is not attached to an existing settlement, but rather at least a few hundred meters distant from it as the crow flies.
4. The outpost was established in the nineties, mostly from the mid-nineties and on.

Sasson defines an outpost as an unauthorized settlement not attached to an existing settlement. If attached, it is regarded as an unauthorized neighborhood. Moreover, outposts can be built either within or beyond the officially determined municipal boundaries. Although the Israeli government acknowledges that settlements built on land privately owned by Palestinians are illegal, it usually provides them with military defense, access to public utilities, and other infrastructure.

=== Outposts versus neighborhood ===
Outposts differ from neighborhoods in that they are built at a substantial distance from authorized settlements. Like outposts, neighborhoods such as Ulpana in Beit El still can be built without authorization. Because the difference is obscure, often disputes arise about whether new houses are the expansion (thickening) of an existing settlement or the start of a new outpost. According to Peace Now, the Israeli government is playing a trick by legalizing outposts as a neighborhood of an existing settlement.

== Types of outposts ==
=== Outposts on state land and on private lands ===
Israel distinguishes between outposts built on state land and those built on privately owned lands. Since the Elon Moreh case in 1979 before the Israeli Supreme Court, the Government formally follows the policy not to allow new settlements on private Palestinian lands.

The Netanyahu government seeks to legalize outposts on state land and dismantle those on private lands. As this state land is part of the Occupied Territories, authorization can only make them legal according to Israeli law; it does not change their illegal status under international law.

In the West Bank, there are two types of state land:

1. Land registered as state land under Jordanian rule, seized in 1967 and declared and registered as state land under Military Order No 59 (1967);
2. State Land declared after 1979 under changed legislation.

Most of the state land belongs to the latter type. According to B'Tselem, the declaration as state land was doubtful in many instances. Israel pretends to apply Ottoman land laws but uses an interpretation of the law that differs from the Ottoman/British Mandate/Jordanian rule. The latter never used declaration of state land as a method to take over lands. International law forbids the occupying power to change the local law in force in the occupied area (in force on the eve of its occupation) unless such a change is necessary for security needs or for the benefit of the local population.

=== "Dummy" outposts ===
"Dummy" outposts are uninhabited outposts. Apparently, some of them were used to distract the IDF in order to prevent the evacuation of occupied outposts. Others are destined to improve negotiation positions by offering extra outposts to remove and show the world that the State is dismantling outposts, The idea of the "dummy" outposts is attributed to Ze'ev Hever, a former leader of the Jewish Underground. The Sasson Report found that most of the evacuated outposts were unpopulated.

=== Military outposts ===
In theory, military outposts are temporary occupations for military strategic purposes, not for the settlement of civilians. In the Occupied Territories, these were typically Nahal settlements, and they became a principal way to start civilian settlements.

== Number of outposts ==
Currently, some hundred outposts exist. The Sasson Report gave a provisional figure of 105 unauthorized outposts by March 2005, although Sasson did not have the disposal of all the necessary information. It found that 26 outposts were on state lands, 15 on private Palestinian lands and 7 on survey lands. The definition of outposts, neighborhoods and authorized settlements may differ between concerned parties. Due to different interpretations, the number of outposts (and of settlements as well) may differ in statistics.

In 2012, four new outposts were established with 317 new housing units built without building permits: Tzofin Tzafon (Tzofin North) outside the Tzofim settlement near Qalqilyah, Nahlei Tal outside the Talmon settlement near Ramallah, Nahalat Yosef near Nablus and Hill 573 as part of the expansion of the settlement Itamar, according to Peace Now.

As of August 2024, there were at least 196 Israeli outposts in the West Bank, reported BBC News, of which 29 were set up in 2023, a number greater than any previous year. BBC News also estimated that possibly 89 of the 196 outposts were built from 2019 onwards.

== Roadmap for Peace ==
In the framework of the 2003 Roadmap for Peace, Israel committed itself under Prime Minister Sharon to evacuate outposts, erected from March 2001, the start of the Sharon government. The Israeli government gave the U.S. a list of 28 unauthorized outposts erected in the West Bank since that date, of which 12 were ordered to be removed, "while some of the remaining 16 outposts [were] in the process of being approved and planned", according to the Israeli daily Haaretz. However, the Israeli NGO Peace Now claimed that there are 45 unauthorized outposts erected in the West Bank after March 2001. Israel did not meet the commitment under the Roadmap. It dismantled few manned outposts and none of the larger ones.

The Government opposes the evacuation of older outposts. After March 2001 outposts were further expanded.

== Legalising outposts ==
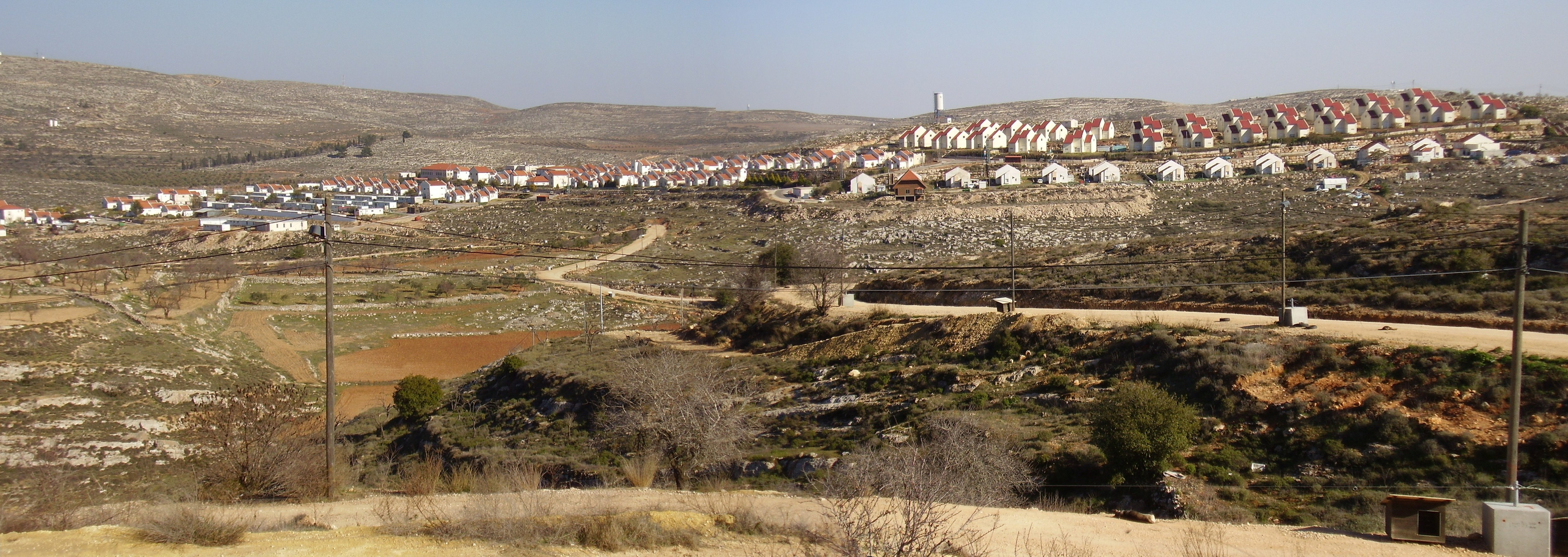
The large outpost-declared-neighborhood Shevut-Rachel seen from Shilo.

In the "Blue Line"-plan, written in January 2011, at least 26 outposts were included in areas defined as "state lands". Left-wing activist Dror Etkes said, this means the state has started a process to legitimize these outposts. In March 2011, the Israeli government under Prime Minister Benyamin Netanyahu declared that it intended to legalise outposts that were built on state land, and to evict the outposts that are on private Palestinian lands.

According to the Israeli NGO Peace Now, the Israeli government under Netanyahu legalised ten illegal outposts in 2012, being the only Israeli government to ever authorize outposts. In February 2012, approval was quietly granted to the outpost Shvut Rachel by redesignating it as a “neighborhood” of the nearby settlement of Shilo, in April of the same year, legal status was conferred on the three outposts Bruchin, Rechelim and Sansana. The Minister of Defense also approved the promotion of plans that will legalize the outposts Nofei Nehemia, Mitzpe Eshtemoa, and El Matan as “neighborhoods” of other settlements or outposts, and in June 2012, the outpost Givat Salit in the northern Jordan Valley was retroactively legalised by redesignating it as a neighbourhood of the nearby Mehola settlement, from which it is separated by a major inter-city highway.

=== Levy Report ===
In late January 2012, Prime Minister Netanyahu appointed a three-member committee headed by former Israeli Supreme Court justice Edmund Levy, dubbed the “outpost committee”, to investigate the legal status of unauthorized West Bank Israeli settlements. The Levy Report published in July 2012, which comes to the conclusion that Israel's presence in the West Bank is not occupation, recommends state approval for unauthorized outposts, and provides proposals for new guidelines for settlement construction. As of April 2013, the report was not brought before the Israeli cabinet or any parliamentary or governmental body which would have the power to approve it.
