= Immanuel Beit Yaakov controversy =

The Immanuel Beit Yaakov controversy concerns the founding of a Hasidic girls' school in the Israeli settlement of Immanuel in September 2007.

The Hasidic school was founded and attended by members of both the Sephardi and Ashkenazi communities, with Rav Shimon Ba'adani as final Rabbinic authority. The Hasidic school was sued by Yoav Lallum, who does not reside in Immanuel, and his group "Noar KeHalacha", with assistance from the New Israel Fund and the "Tmura" and "Achoti" organizations; the allegation—that this was solely an ethnic split between Sephardim and Ashkenazim. Rabbi Shimon Baadani, is the spiritual leader of the Yemenite community in Emanuel, all of whose daughters study the Hassidic class at 2010, most of whom are of Ashkenazi descent.

In a 2009 Israeli Supreme Court ruling, a claim was accepted regarding separation on the basis of origin between Mizrahi and Ashkenazi students at the Beit Yaakov girls' elementary school in Emanuel. Mizrahi students who studied with them refrained from sending their daughters to school so that they would not study with the rest of the Mizrahi students. There were huge demonstrations in Bnei Brak and Jerusalem. A compromise reached between the parties led to the parents' release from prison, and with the approval of the Ministry of Education, a separate Hassidic school was opened for girls, which the state and local council prevented from budgeting That they meet the conditions of admission to the institution.

In June 2010, the fathers of the girls who attend the Hasidic school, one third of whom are Sephardi, were jailed by the Israeli Supreme Court for contempt of court. They were released before the end of their sentence when large-scale protests against what was alleged to be an inhumane and illegal incarceration swept the country. Secular journalist Nahum Barnea described the court decision as one "made not from the heart, nor from the head, but rather from the belly".

The Sephardi parents of the Hasidic school had presented an emergency appeal to appear before the Supreme Court. They point out that every family was invited to apply. Their request to appear before the court was denied.

The court has since approved a separate school for the Haredi girls in the 2010–2011 academic year, albeit without funding.

== Incident ==
=== Background ===
Over the years, complaints have been received by the Public Complaints Commission, the Knesset Education Committee, and organizations such as the Association for Civil Rights and the Youth Proper Association, for discrimination against students from the Eastern community in ultra-Orthodox educational institutions. These complaints mostly referred to seminars, in which it was argued that there was a pre-determined quota by the school, which limited the number of students from Eastern denominations who could be admitted to it. Among other things, it was claimed that the discrimination was legitimized following the decision of Rabbi Yosef Shalom Elyashiv, the leader of the Lithuanian ultra-Orthodox community, who set a quota that requires seminary directors to accept Spanish students at least 30% every year, for affirmative action. And the percentage of students from the East did not exceed this percentage.

The Immanuel Beit Yaakov hosts a population of female students from both Ashkenazi and Sephardic schools of Judaism, with many of the parents of the Ashkenazi students coming from the Slonim Hasidic group.

Slonim educational institutions are open to all who agree to abide by their school by-laws.

In the fall of 2007 two new schools were founded: the Beis Yaakov Chasidi and Ohel Rachel VeLeah. The Beis Yaakov Chasidi consisted of first through eighth grades, and was placed in the vacated part of the original Beis Yaakov that had housed the high school until the high school got its own building in 2004. The Ohel Rachel and Leah, a Shas-Mayan Sephardic school, was located on the first floor of this new high school, had a first grade in 2007 (see Bass report, page 6 paragraph 12), becoming a fully graded school in 2009.

Rav Shimon Ba'adani of Bnei Brak was appointed as final Rabbinic authority of the Beis Yaakov Chasidi. In October 2007 he issued a letter that was placed in every mailbox in Immanuel forbidding the bringing of grievances to the media or secular courts. Rabbi Bar Lev of Immanuel states, "Ministers Pinchasi and Margi of the Shas party were concerned about reports in the media about alleged discrimination. As soon as they saw that Rav Ba'adani was the arbitrator of the school, they were satisfied with the situation and withdrew their investigation."

Media sources alleged that the founding of the Chassidic Beit Yaakov was solely an ethnic split. In Haaretz, from 2007 until after the fathers were jailed, nearly 30% of whom were Sephardic, the reports continued that this was solely an ethnic split.

Only after Haaretz conducted a direct interview with one of the imprisoned fathers, an article in June 2010 concedes: "a third of the group ... are Sephardic themselves."

Supreme Court documents alleged that this was solely an ethnic split. Again, there was no trial, no cross examining the defendants or plaintiffs.

The New Israel Fund, which assisted the prosecution, claimed on its website and that of its grantee organizations, that this was solely an ethnic split: "The students have been physically separated within this school based solely on ethnicity."

Allegations in the media arose in 2007 about the physical separation of the new school from the old. Attorney Mordechai Bass notes on page 7 of his fifteen-page report: "The yard surrounds the school from four directions, and the girls (from both schools) are able to see and play with each other. The (media) portrayal of two completely separate sections of the school yard ... is not true."

Allegedly, the Chassidic school built a fence in the play yard; cement walls in the corridor; using separate staff rooms; different dress codes; etc., essentially splitting the school in two.

The Chabad-Lubavitch girls' school was founded in the late 1990s. Many residents of Immanuel send their children to national-religious schools in the neighboring towns of Karnei Shomron, Kedumim, and Shavei Shomron; to Hasidic schools in Bnei Brak; to vocational schools in Petah Tikva, etc. Thus, there is a wide variety of choices in education for families who live in Emanuel.

=== Discrimination allegations ===
Before the Chasidi school was founded, outreach programs designed to get all the Beis Yaakov parents to take upon more strict observance, and thus circumvent the need for a new school, had been attempted.

==== Ethnic self-concept of the parents of the Chassidic school ====
When Yaakov Menken asked Rabbi Zaide (who is a member of the Slonimer Chassidic sect) about the ethnic composition of the Chassidic school, he responded, "... every time someone asks this question, I feel sick. Am I supposed to investigate whose parent is this or that?" He could not understand why anyone would have a problem with another child in the classroom that wasn't well-founded on grounds of religious standards.

At the end of the 2007 school year, construction work began on the Beit Yaakov school in Emanuel, which belongs to the independent education stream, which included plaster walls in the school corridors and the teachers' room, black fabrics covering the windows and separation fences in the yard. Separate facilities. The uniform was also changed to differentiate between the students of the two schools, and it was argued that the break hours were also adjusted so that the students from the two majors did not meet. The Hassidic major, most (73%) of Ashkenazi descent. Officially, the old school principal also served as the new school principal. In both majors, about 215 students studied, in grades 1-8.

In a later examination (by Mordechai Bass, as described below), it was found that the Independent Education Center ordered that the management of the two majors be shared, and that the pedagogical environment - including the teachers' room, curriculum, school hours and breaks - be shared by all students. The school, but these guidelines were not complied with.However, in a letter to the Ministry of Education dated September 23, 2007, the Independent Education Center confirmed that it knew about the separation process and refrained from taking practical action to prevent it.

Some of the parents of students of Mizrahi origin, who opposed the separation, filed a complaint with the Ministry of Education in August 2007, stating that the separation was against an ethnic background and a general ethnic conflict in Emanuel, and that the separation discriminated against girls of Mizrahi origin. The parents' opposition was led by Ezra Gershi, who was later elected chairman of the council in Emanuel. MK Yaakov Margi, who then served as chairman of the Shas faction in the Knesset, also joined the appeal. Shlomit Amichai, to the independent education center to cancel the separation in the school and return the situation to its normal state within a limited time, with the warning that if the instruction is not carried out, the revocation of the school's license will be considered.

In a report submitted by Bass to the Ministry of Education on March 2, 2008, he described the chain of events against the background of the special social situation in Emanuel. In this speech and in the modesty of some of the school's students, this group of parents approached the independent education administration on the subject, which agreed to establish a separate department in the school, but opposed the establishment of a separate school, and demanded that the school administration be common to both departments. And the curriculum will be shared.According to the report, there was in fact a complete separation between the two majors, a separation that included the administration, the teachers' room, the uniform and the breaks in the yard. The report cites a letter from the Independent Education Administration stating that the actual separation was known to her, but she refrained from taking action to stop the separation.

On page 2 of the Bass report: "The percentage of Ashkenazi families in the original school is 23%, and in the new (Chasidi) school, 73%."(Footnote at bottom: "Such figures are not totally accurate—firstly, the schools do not note the ethnicity of their students in the registration—and This is a good thing! Secondly—this figure was ... partially based on the tenor of the family name, which can also be inaccurate.")

The plaintiffs viewed the Chassidic school as opened solely to discriminate against the girls of Sephardi origin. A belief allegedly shared throughout parts of the Sephardi community in Israel, who allegedly feel discriminated against by the Ashkenazi community—even by the secular parts of the country's Ashkenazi leadership, and, according to the New Israel Fund website, by the Haredi schools. The plaintiffs pointed out that the students in the new section were instructed to pray in the Ashkenazi tradition and accent, which encouraged their belief about it being a force of discrimination against them.

However, the original Beis Yaakov instructs in the Sephardi accent for prayer.

There was a Channel 2 investigative report in October 2007.

"The topic has been in the headlines over the past year thanks to the efforts of the NIF (New Israel Fund) family."

The media paid special attention to the alleged separating wall; this helped the media portray it as segregation. However, Attorney Mordechai Bass states on page 7 of his report: "The yard surrounds the school from four directions, and the girls (from both schools) are able to see and play with each other. The (media) portrayal of two completely separate sections of the school yard ... is not true." See "Bass report" below.

Later the Haredi parents representative, Rav Avrohom Luria, would recognize that the wall was a PR disaster and "a serious mistake".

Rav Luria and the Haredi parents disputed the notion that the split occurred due to discrimination. They pointed out that they have 27% of Sephardi girls in their new section—including the daughter of one of the founders of the new section, Rabbi Yitzhak Bar-Lev, the official Sephardi Rabbi of Emmanuel—and also that they allowed their girls to study together with the Sephardi pupils for decades before the split. The parents association was quoted in the Haredi media saying that "Up to three years ago, even as all other Haredi centers already contained separate schools for every community. i.e. Hasidim; Lithuanians; Sephardim; etc, Immanuel was proud to have only one school, and a wonderful relationship. our daughters were lectured by Sephardi teachers and we had no problem whatsoever".

Rav Luria explained that the split was crucial to the integrity of their children because of a new modern element that moved into town and threatened their lifestyle and the strict education that Haredi Jews give to their children—in terms of dress, exposure to television and media, music, choice of careers, etc. In fact the new track adopted rules identical to those in force at all other Haredi institutions throughout the country. "The nature of the population in Immanuel changed drastically in previous years, and when everybody sent their children to the same school it was a recipe for disaster. We asked for stricter rules that would comply with our standards but this wasn't suitable for other parents. It became clear to both sides that we need to part ways, and simply turn to the model that's already implemented in all other Haredi centers", the parents association told the media.

=== Complaints to Education Ministry ===
The contending parents then turned to Yoav Lalum, founder and head of the No'ar KaHalakha organization, which is a New Israel Fund grantee, whose stated aim is to fight against discrimination in Haredi schools. Lalum was fresh off his own court battle with a Bais Yaakov School in his own neighborhood in Givat Shaul, Jerusalem, which refused to accept his daughter into the school. Lalum lost this court battle, but still was the only Sephardi of Haredi origin willing to openly use the secular court system; the Shulchan Aruch forbids to use the secular law system to solve disputes.

==== Bass Report ====
At first Lalum turned repeatedly to the Education Ministry that they should step in to end the alleged discrimination. In response to his request the Ministry's Chief Executive appointed the former attorney general to The State Comptroller of Israel, Mordechai Bass, to review the case and determine if the new section is part of a Segregation effort.

After a month Bass submitted his report on 2 March 2008, that he found no discrimination, and that the sole purpose of the separation was due to religious beliefs of the separating parents. he specifically pointed out to the fact that every Sephardi parent that tried to get in the new section was accepted, and that none of the complaining parents ever actually tried to get into the new section and got rejected, to what he applies rhetorically: "If there is no rejection, where is the discrimination? [אם סירוב אין, אפליה מנין?]".

In the report he also revealed that after meeting with some of the complaining parents he actually found some ground for the proposition of the Hasidic parents that some of the baal teshuva parents in the original school were still not fit to blend within the Haredi community. By example, that one parent repeatedly used profanity to describe his Ashkenazi opponents, even though it is strictly forbidden in the Haredi community.

Attorney Mordechai Bass' Evaluation of the Beis Yaakov Emanuel Case

This is a partial English translation of the report of Mordchai Bass. The Hebrew version can be viewed on the following blog: Attorney Mordechai Bass' Report on the Immanuel Beit Yaakov Girls' School - דו"ח עו"ד מרדכי בס על בית הספר לבנות עמנואל בית יעקב

Page 1

Invitation to investigate

"On January 28, 2008 I was invited to evaluate the complaints of ethnic discrimination made against the Beis Yaakov Emanuel administration. I have thoroughly reviewed relevant material ... and have met with administrators from the ministry of education, the 'chinuch Atzmaei' (independent religious schools' network, which Beis Yaakov is a part of), and I visited the two schools in question."

Page 2

Evaluation of ethnicity

"The percentage of Ashkenazi families in the original school is 23%, and in the new (Chasidic) school, 73%."

(Footnote at bottom: "Such figures are not totally accurate – firstly, the schools do not note the ethnicity of their students in the registration – and this is a good thing! Secondly – this figure was ... partially based on the tenor of the family name, which can also be inaccurate.")

Were any families refused admission to the Beis Yaakov Chasidi, Emanuel?

"All parents wanting to sign up their daughters to the new school, and were ready to accept upon themselves the school's conditions, were accepted (lit. 'not refused'). Since there was no rejection (of any applicants), where is the discrimination?"

Page 5

Description of Emanuel Community

"A varied population dwells in Emanuel – Chassidic, Lithuanian, Sephardic, some families have been Haredi for generations, some for one generation, some are newly religious for a few years. In larger towns, this variety is expressed in a variety of schools. Until this year there was only one (Haredi) school in the town."

Attorney Bass notes the tensions between the stricter, sheltered factions and the more open, lenient factions.

Page 6

Attorney Bass notes the founding of the Sephardic girls' school in Emanuel, Beit Rachel and Leah, under the Mayan-Shas network, which at the time had only a small first grade.

He notes the various options that the parents explored – having different tracts in the same building, or opening a new school. In the end, a new school was founded.

Page 7

"The two schools are administrated separately, with two different principals.:

Physical separation between the two schools – fact or fiction?

"... photographers claimed that the cloth that was placed on the (pre-existing) fence prevented the girls from seeing each other. This is not true. Only part of the fence was covered. The yard surrounds the school from four directions, and the girls (from both schools) are able to see and play with each other. The (media) portrayal of two completely separate sections of the school yard ... is not true."

Page 8

"Were the students in the two schools divided according to ethnicity? The plaintiffs claim yes (the top of this page exhibits the plaintiffs' claim).... The original school has 107 Sephardic girls and 32 Ashkenazim. The percentage of Ashkenazim is thus 23%. The new (Chasidi) school has 58 Ashkenazi girls and 21 Sephardim. The percentage of Sephardim is thus 27%.... I repeat that ... anyone interested in registering their daughters in the new school and ready to accept the school's way of life was not refused.

"I spoke to the plaintiffs and asked for one instance of parents who asked to register their daughter and was refused and they had no such case.

He goes on to discuss the legal technicalities of opening a new school, licensing, and so forth.

Page 11

Again – physical separation between the two schools – fact or fiction?

Attorney Bass reiterates that accusations of physical barriers between the two schools were exaggerated and that indeed there was free access between the girls of both schools. He notes that the new school occupies (the third floor) rooms, which were unused. (The third floor had housed the high school, and was vacated in September 2004 when the high school got its own building.)

Paragraphs 4 and 5 address the plaintiffs' accusation that the times of school starting and recess were at different times. Attorney Bass found this to be untrue.

Paragraph 6 on page 11 addresses the plaintiffs' accusation that the girls in each school were forbidden contact with each other. Attorney Bass notes that there was no such ordinance issued by the school.

Page 12

More on the culture of Emanuel – Sheltering children. Here, Attorney Bass sensitively notes the great variety that exists in the Haredi world, despite its outward uniform appearance in dress. He suggests that non-Haredim attempt to understand the mentality of sheltering from the outside world, and that the more strict and sheltered Haredim would understandably be wary of having their children have close contact with more lenient and worldly Haredim.

Page 13, paragraph 22

Was there ethnic discrimination in the Beis Yaakov Emanuel?

"The division was not ethnic, it was religious. I am convinced that there is no ethnic discrimination."

Conclusion

"When ethnic discrimination actually occurs, we must combat it with all our might. I express my sorrow about complaints like these – thrown in the air – that increase hatred among Israel, and are totally baseless."

Signed

Attorney Mordechai Bass

Bass still found that the opening of a new section under the same permit and symbol of the old school was a violation of the Ministry's administration regulations and therefore the school, and/or its parent organization shall be punished accordingly.

=== Lalum turns to the court ===
The day following the release of the Bass report, as he realized that the Education Ministry would not intervene, Lalum decided to turn to the legal system—something almost unprecedented in Haredi history. Lalum, however, had already done that before, and with permission of his spiritual guide Rabbi Ya'akov Yosef, eldest son of the renowned Sephardi Rabbi Ovadia Yosef (although they had an estranged relationship in the past), he petitioned the Supreme Court of Israel on 4 February 2008 to order the Education Ministry, the local municipality board of Immanuel, the Haredi Independent Education Center and the parents' organization of the Beit Yaakov school, to stop their aid to and/or close the new section.

The three judges selected by Chief Justice Dorit Beinisch to hear this case were Edmund Levy, Hanan Melcer, and Edna Arbel. They accepted the case on 14 July 2008, and Levy was appointed by Beinish as the head of the panel.

=== Negotiations ===
The Education Ministry immediately responded that it accepts the findings of the Bass Report about the illegal use of one permit for two schools without reporting it to the ministry, and that in itself is grounds enough to revoke the school's license. They warned the Independent Education Center, the parent organization of the Beit Yaakov school, that they should reunite both sections as one general school, and that it is only allowed to organize a separate track with different classes for the two streams but not fully divided sections. If the center and/or school will not comply then they might lose their license and/or their government funding.

But in the meantime the Ministry refused to get involved in the discrimination issue, saying that it lacks the criteria to decide this, and therefore the Independent Education Center should be liable to assure there is no segregation in the school.

In the midst of all this there were ongoing negotiations between the Independent Education Center and the Ministry. In August both parties agreed that the sections will be reunited, if the school will accept new binding policies for the "Hasidic track". The first version included, among others, the following rules:

- The prayers will be conducted in Hebrew, but in Ashkenazi accent. The pupils should also use this accent at home, to facilitate on the students that aren't used to this accent at home.
- The rabbinical authority for the Hasidic track will be the official Sephardi Rabbi from Emmanuel, Rabbi Yitzhok Bar-Lev. The parents pledge to assure there is no conflict between the spiritual authority at home and the Rabbi.
- For modesty reasons, the girls will not be allowed to drive bicycles outside of their home.
- The parents shall control with whom their daughters associate after school, that they should only be with other girls whose lifestyle doesn't contradict with the Beit Yaakov teachings.
- The parents should be clothed modestly, in accordance with the Modesty laws of Rabbi Shmuel Wosner.
- There should be no radio at home, no television, no computer where they could watch movies, and no access to the internet.
- Parents shall refrain from taking their kids to hotels and other entertainment facilities.
- The kids shouldn't stay at the homes of non-observant relatives.

This version was shown to the court, where Justice Levy, himself an Iraqi descendant, quipped on the first rule about the Ashkenazi accent that "even of you give me a thousand whips I won't be able to talk with a Lithuanian accent".

However, a Beis Yaakov student clarified: "The teacher instructs one accent for prayer. In the original Beis Yaakov, we were instructed in the Sephardi accent. In the Chassidic Beis Yaakov, they teach the Ashkenazi accent. But no girl is ever corrected if they use their accent from home, never. Yemenites pronounce their Chet's and Ayin's in their [sic] guttural way, and have a special lilt to the HaMotzi blessing. Those who wish to use the Galicianer accent, which is not taught in either of the Beis Yaakovs, may do so."

After further deliberations, and by instruction of the court, the first rule was removed. So was the rule about using the Modesty laws from Rabbi Wosner changed after the court viewed him as "too strict", to a "Panel of authoritative Rabbis from the Independent Education Center". The changes were accepted by all parties, including the Hasidic Parents of Emmanuel.

However, both, the court and the Ministry also demanded that the divider be removed; that they reunite the staff room, and use the same dress codes. The Hasidic parents were ready to remove any physical divider, but refused to oblige to the demands to reunite the school, claiming that they wouldn't send their children in one school with the other girls from homes that they don't want their daughters associating with.

=== Allegations of court bias ===
Understanding the expansion of power of the Israeli Supreme court in the 1990s assists in understanding the Immanuel Beit Yaakov topic. Aharon Barak was President of the Supreme Court of Israel from 1995 to 2006. Richard A. Posner, a senior lecturer at the University of Chicago Law School, contrasts the American model of government checks and balances to Aaron Barak's concept of law: "In Barak's conception of the separation of powers, the judicial power is unlimited. ... What he means by separation of powers is that the executive and legislative branches are to have no degree of control over the judicial branch. ... If each of the powers (executive, legislative, and judicial) were administered by a branch that was wholly independent and thus could ignore the others, the result would be chaos. The branches have to be mutually dependent ...

Professor Daphna Barak-Erez has commented: "One of the most significant impacts of Judge Aaron Barak on Israeli law is found in the change which he led with regard to all matters of justiciability. Under the leadership of Judge Barak, the Supreme Court significantly increased the [range of] fields in which it is [willing to intervene]".

Journalist Shmuel Kofer comments on judicial activism of the Israeli Supreme Court, "when judges use their position as a political—ideological platform, this is not merely politicization of justice, nor does it merely invalidate the decisions of the knesset and government, it degrades the Supreme Court itself."

Law professor Daniel Freedman, "the actions of Edmond Levi show how justice degenerates when 'law is everywhere'."

Ben-Dror Yemini, journalist on legal affairs for Maariv, comments, "when there is a case against Sephardim or the religious, Edmond Levy is put at the forefront to avoid any accusations of anti-Sephardic or anti-religious bias."

The Hasidic parents constantly claimed that Levy, an Iraqi descendant and the only Mizrahi/Sephardi judge on the court, took an unusual and personal interest in the case. Rav Luria, the above mentioned spokesperson for the parents claimed that "The behavior of Justice Levy was strange, to speak mildly. One of the petitioners even said that Levy gave him his email and his cell phone number so that he could be sure to stay up to date on all developments".

He then added: "During the arguments, Edmond Levy spoke as if he was the petitioner. Some of this is reflected in the transcripts. [His comments] give the clear impression, and please allow us to be shocked, [of] interference from the Court in Haredi education. This interference is without precedent, even in the days of Aharon Barak. It lacks any legal basis. The judges just decide according to their gut feelings".

Attorney Rabbi Mordechai Green, founder of Betzedek, represented the parents before the High Court. In his brief, he pleaded that the Court not allow "a clash that is of a religious, value-oriented and conscience driven nature, that does serious harm to the legal rights of the parents as anchored in the Basic Laws of the State of Israel. ... The Court is deviating from its liberal approach in an exceptional way and it is forcing the individual a specific way of behavior that is against his free choice and inner convictions.

== Court ruling ==
On 6 August 2009, the court ruled unanimously that it considers the division in Emmanuel as segregationist in nature, and it should therefore be ended immediately.

=== Judge Levy delivers the court ruling ===
The lead judge Edmund Levy wrote the ruling. In his syllabus he quotes the Bass Report, which concluded that there was no ethnic discrimination, and that the separation was based only on religious criteria because the "Hasidim aren't interested to reveal their daughters to a modern lifestyle, which includes, according to them, inappropriate language and behavior that doesn't match the strict modesty laws they practice".

After a long summary of the events leading up to the ruling, and the legal statutes for the case, Levy sums up the legal dilemma:

Indeed, some say—and so claimed the external assessor, attorney Bass—that there are behavioral; cultural; and ethnic characteristics that discriminate the particular sector, but are part of the inherent religious worldview of the various sectors. Meaning that at the colliding of the two rights—the right to education and the right to equality—there are certain characteristics required to conserve the values of one, but which will then conflict with the other. What requires us to balance between the competing rights.

— Judge Levy's ruling, Article 21

Levy then determines that:

A institution may hold a unique trend in which students will study ways of religion and worldview of a certain community. So may the institution determine the rules of conduct applicable to students in this trend, for the purpose of implementing the teachings taught in the framework. However, the institution must enable each student that meets the terms of the relevant threshold, and is willing to adopt the accompanying lifestyle, to learn where he wants. Above all, it is clear that a student's ethnicity isn't a relevant condition for applying to a certain trend, and that creating a separation in one institution—by separating the students throughout the entire learning day; the introduction of a different uniform; separation of staff room; and the collection of extra fees—isn't a relevant measure for the purpose of the student's studies. The educational institution may distinguish between students just for the studies of the special content for those trends only [emphasis added], and the routine school rules must be common to all students of the institution throughout the entire school day.

— Judge Levy's ruling, Article 24

Afterward Levy turns to the factual side of the case and finds that:

In the case before us the purpose of the rules—some of which are found in the school code of the Hasidic trend, and some were put into practice without official regulations—as proven in the report of Attorney Bass, was one and only: the separation of the Hasidic girls from their Sephardi friends. This determination is based first of all on the end result which shows that there were actually two departments in the school. These departments—which were first known as two completely separate schools, and then just two trends—were characterized by a non-accidental segmented population, that points like a thousand witnesses to the discriminatory intent of the initiators of the separation. This is a gap, on "[Whom] it is said that it speaks for itself" (Vice-President M. Cheshin in HCJ 240/98, Adalah – The Legal Center for Arab Minority Rights in Israel V. Minister of Religious Affairs, P"D 52(5) 167, 178 (1998)).

This discrimination was also clearly expressed in the 'School code' that was brought for approval to the Director-General of the Education Ministry, and a handful of its articles were mentioned above. A review of the code reveals that we aren't dealing with "a trend that aims to teach the Hasidic way of life", but with an attempt to separate between the segments of the population on a sectarian basis, and this under the guise of cultural difference. The preference of students from a certain group to get into the Hasidic trend, while piling on bureaucratic difficulties for parents from a different group wanting to register their daughters to this trend, severely violates their right to Equality. Same is with school's demand to the parents of students that they live by the religion standard of the institution, and the request—that's good that it was omitted from the provisions of the regulations—that the Prayer language would be only in the Ashkenazi accent.

All these are there only to serve an unacceptable purpose, and this is to close the Hasidic trend's doors to Sephardi girls only because of their origin.

— Judge Levy's ruling, Article 26

Therefore:

We order the Independent Education Center to remove any indication, both formal and substantive, of the phenomenon of discrimination that was common at the school. We also order the Education Ministry that as long he finds that the Independent Education Center does not comply with this provision, it must take all legal measures to remedy the situation, including revoking of license of the school and stopping its funding.

— Judge Levy's ruling, Article 29

=== Judges Arbel and Melcer ===
Judges Edna Arbel and Hanan Melcer agreed to Levy's ruling and added their comments.

Like Levy, Arbel also pointed to the proposed article that all prayers should be in Ashkenazi accent as proof that the "real intention" of the separation was segregation between Sephardim and Ashkenazim. She added that the same argument applies to another rule in the proposed school code that "all students and their parents are required to adhere to the authority of the chosen Ashkenazi Rabbi", even if they are from Sephardi origin and they should have been allowed to follow the teachings of their own, Sephardic, rabbis. "This broad and unrestrained requirement through the code shows in my opinion the real desire that stands behind it, to separate between communities and not between different religious levels". (Although she probably didn't realize that the proposed authoritative Rabbi over the "whole" new section, Rabbi Bar-Lev, is himself from Sephardi origin. Nevertheless, the word "Ashkenazi" next to Rabbi never appeared in the code). Rav Shimon Ba'adani of Bnei Brak had been appointed as arbitrator and final authority of the Beis Yaakov Chasidi

Aviad Visoli states that the Supreme Court held no hearing, no cross-examination of plaintiffs or defendants, rendering the court's decision illegal.

Melcer wrote longer comments, wherein he tried to compare this ruling to the historic Brown v. Board of Education that ended segregation in the US and outlawed the "separate but equal" mentality. he goes farther than his colleagues and declares the "religious argument" as a hidden "camouflage" for discrimination, without any explanation. He also throws in that, contrary to the United States, religious freedom "still hasn't gotten constitutional status" in Israel. In the end he agrees to the ruling of judge Levy.

== Court aftermath ==
At this point the Hasidic parents were already angered with the court, in what they believed to be a forcible meddling of the court in the strict Haredi lifestyle and an attack on their right to self-education, being as the Haredim in Israel have a long and ongoing feud with the High Court whom it views as hostile to the ultra-orthodox Jewish community.

The parents of the Chassidic school then sent their daughters to a Chassidic school in Bnei Brak. After one day, the court forbid the parents to send their daughters to the school in Bnei Brak or any other school besides the original Beis Yaakov, or even home school them, lest they be held in contempt of court.

As the start of the new school year approached, the Hasidic parents were determined not to send their daughters in one school with the other, less strict, Haredi pupils, so they tried to find a way that would satisfy the court and still will not force them to compromise on their religious beliefs.

=== Founding of new Sephardi school ===
"Ohel Rachel and Leah", under the Sephardic Shas-based "Ma'ayan HaChinuch HaTorani" education network had been founded in the same year that the Beis Yaakov Chassidi was founded—2007 (see Bass report, page 6 paragraph 10). One hundred and eight students from the original school switched to the new Sephardi school; 104 of those were Sephardi girls.

Some 160 students remained in the old school, about 80 girls in the original section, and 74 in the Hasidic section. Physical dividers were removed. Both sections used the same entrance, uniform, staff room, and so on. The sections were only fully divided during the study hours.

All the parties involved were satisfied. Ezra Gershi, one of the original petitioners and then mayor of Immanuel, sent an official municipality letter to Yoav Lelum declaring the matter closed.

== Additional lawsuit by Lalum ==
In 2010, an additional civil suit was brought before the Supreme Court of Justice by Sephardi Yoav Lalum, who had already initiated a similar suit against a Beit Yaakov school in Jerusalem two years earlier (the earlier suit was thrown out by the court). At this point the Hasidic group established a private school for their students in private apartments. The Supreme Court then fined both schools' operators with 5,000 NIS per day (approximately 1,300 USD), with the Ministry of Education issuing a closure order for the private school.

On 15 June 2010 the Israeli Supreme Court ordered the parents of the Chassidic school to return their children to the Immanuel Beit Yaakov, and announced a two-week prison term for any of the parents who had not complied by 16 June. The parents rejected the court order as a violation of religious independence, and voluntarily submitted to incarceration on 17 June.

=== Reaction and subsequent events ===
This issue has become a cause célèbre for Haredim in Israel, and over 100,000 turned up in Jerusalem for protests against the imprisonment; clerics of both Ashkenazi and Sephardi strains of Israeli Haredi Judaism (including Tuvia Blau and Yaakov Yosef) have also entered into rabbinical negotiations on the issue.

On 18 June 2010 two of the parents lodged an emergency appeal against their imprisonment. The appeal is on the grounds of lack of due process, since the parents were never given a hearing in their alleged contempt of court. Another appeal was lodged on 20 June 2010 by Shurat Hadin on the grounds that the actions of the court were ultra vires, since the Supreme Court of Justice is explicitly excluded from giving judgement against individuals. That same day, negotiations for withdrawing the complaint fell through.

It has been noted that the Hasidic stream at the Immanuel school has a much higher percentage of Sephardim than the membership of the Supreme Court.

=== Legal irregularities ===
Observers have noted that the decision by the commission headed by supreme court justice Edmond Levy, to imprison the mothers after the end of the school year (once the fathers are freed), is contrary to the law stipulating that court-ordered imprisonment can only be used as an inducement to obey court orders, but never as punishment.

== Impact ==
The charges of segregation of students at the Immanuel Beit Yaakov have reflected long-running divisions in Israeli Jewish culture between religious Ashkenazim, religious Sephardim and Mizrahim, and secular Israelis who have resided for most of Israel's history in a system that has allegedly given concessions and jurisdictions to the Jewish religious authorities, in addition to far greater perks to secular institutions, including subsidies for theaters and sports sites. The challenge of the Supreme Court against Ashkenazi religious dictates is also perceived as casting light upon a long-running perception of the High Court as being biased in favor of secular Israeli concerns. Note that the court approved a separate school for the chasidic girls in the 2010 academic year, albeit without funding. A number of Sephardic girls whose families consented to the school's modesty code are attending, as well.
