= Independent Education System (Israel) =

Alternative system for the Haredi community

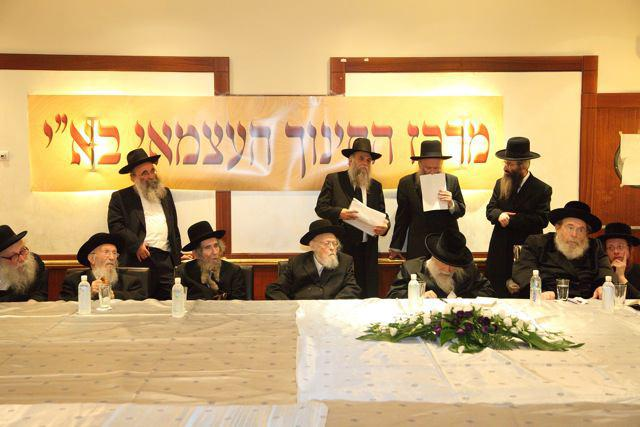
A gathering of rabbis to benefit Chinuch Atzmai. Seated left-right: Rabbi Nissim Karelitz, Rabbi Michel Yehuda Lefkowitz, Rabbi Aharon Leib Shteinman, Rabbi Yosef Shalom Elyashiv, likely Rabbi Yochanan Sofer (with head tilted).

The Independent Education System of Israel (Hebrew: החינוך העצמאי - which is translated "independent education", and could be transliterated as Khinukh Atsmai or Chinuch Atzmai) is an alternate school system run by, and serving the needs of, the Haredi Jewish (ultra-Orthodox Jewish) community of Israel.

It was established in 1953 by a decision of the Moetzes Gedolei HaTorah (Council of Torah Sages of Agudath Yisrael in Israel), and implemented through the State Education law. It was initially led by Rabbi Zalman Sorotzkin, and now is run by an umbrella center that operates a large network of schools, kindergarten through high school, gender-separated, throughout the country.

By 1978, there were 300 of these schools in Israel; by 2003, that number had grown to 800.

== Overview ==
The diverse nature of Israel's society is accommodated within the framework of the Israeli education systems. Different sectors of the population attend different schools. Although parents are comforted by the fact that their children's school may reflect their basic worldview, this separation often results in little contact among the various segments of Israeli society.

Schools are divided into five groups:

- State schools (mamlachti), attended by a majority of the pupils;
- State religious schools (mamlachti dati), which emphasize Jewish religious studies, tradition, and observance;
- Independent religious schools (Chinuch Atzmai), which focus almost entirely on Talmud Torah and offer little in terms of secular subjects, at least for the boys;
- Private schools, which reflect the philosophies of specific groups of parents (Democratic Schools) or are based on a curriculum of a foreign country (e. g., The American School); and lastly,
- Arab schools, with instruction in Arabic and a focus on Arab history, religions, and culture.

There are approximately 80,000 students currently enrolled in Chinuch Atzmai schools, which include Beis Yaakov schools for girls and Talmud Torah, Cheder, and Yeshiva Ketana for boys. There is a strong emphasis on Jewish religious studies in these programs.

== Funding and operation ==
The schools are partially supported by the State; however, the Ministry of Education is not responsible for the hiring and firing of teachers or for the registration of pupils.

Schools in the Chinuch Atzmai system are allocated 55% of the budget that regular state schools receive, and are required to teach 55% of the Ministry of Education's curriculum. Chinuch Atzmai's funding has traditionally been supplemented by donations from outside Israel, particularly the United States. Rabbi Aharon Kotler, one of the movement's founders, was extremely instrumental in fund-raising for the organization. Due to sharp cuts in state funding over recent years, the movement has had to redouble its efforts in order to keep schools from closing.

A pressing issue is the transportation of pupils from peripheral towns to schools. Unlike schools sponsored by the Ministry of Education, a Supreme Court ruling has cut the funding of transportation to independent schools. To solve this problem, the "Transportation Fund" was founded in 2006. The Transportation Fund funds transportation of pupils to schools, so that they would enroll in independent religious schools rather than state-run secular schools.

== Controversy ==
The center was a main focus of the controversial court ruling against the Beit Yaakov school in Immanuel in summer 2010, when it was fined for not complying with the court's ruling.
