= Levy Report =

Report that supported Israeli occupation and settlement of the West Bank

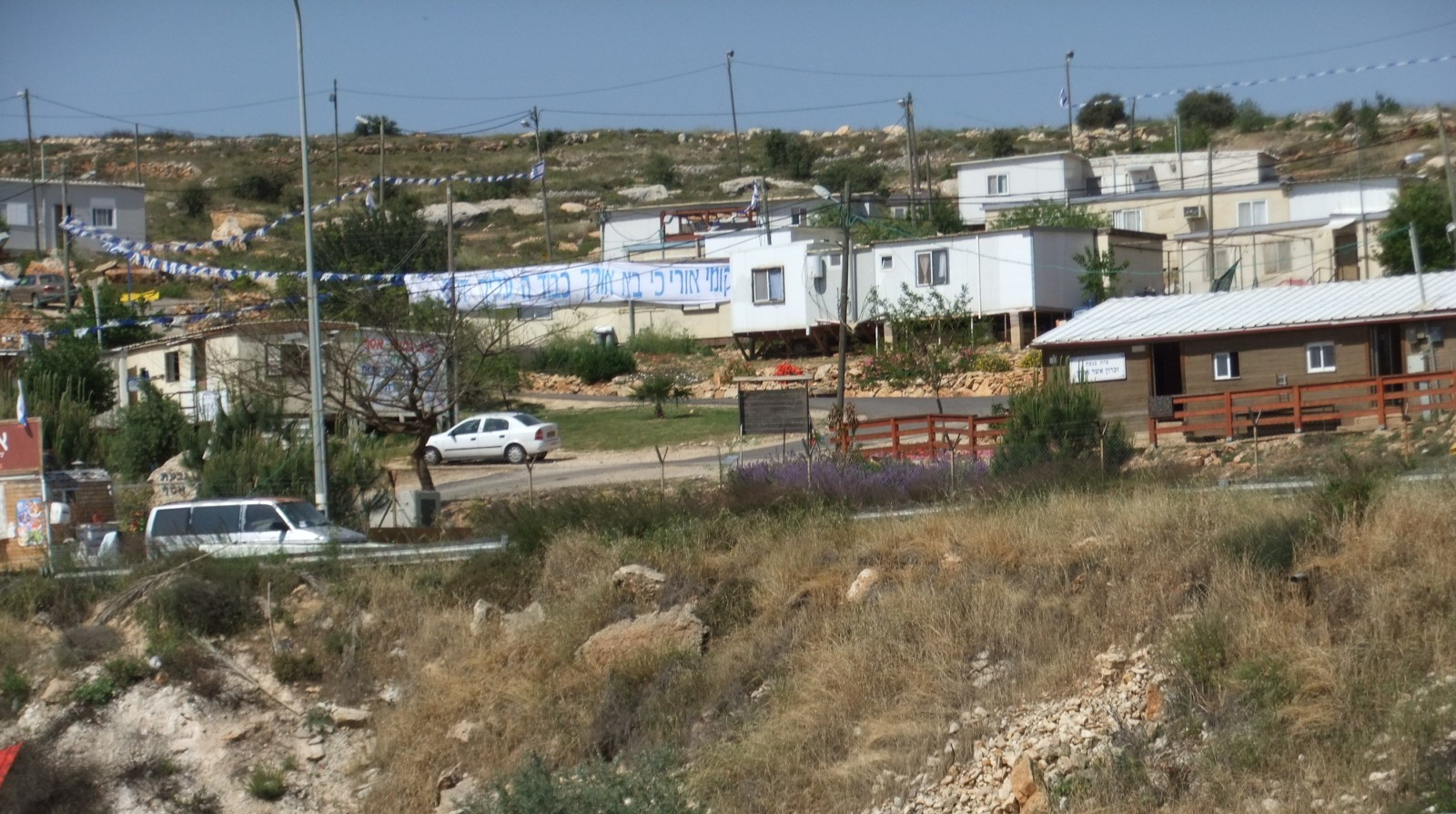
The outpost Giv'at Asaf decorated for Yom Ha'atzmaut, 2011

The Levy Report (Hebrew: דו״ח לוי), officially called Report on the Legal Status of Building in Judea and Samaria (Hebrew: דו״ח על מעמד הבניה באזור יהודה ושומרון), is an 89-page report on West Bank settlements published on 9 July 2012, authored by a three-member committee headed by former Israeli Supreme Court justice Edmund Levy. The committee, dubbed the "outpost committee", was appointed by Israel's prime minister Benjamin Netanyahu in late January 2012 to investigate the legal status of unauthorized West Bank Jewish settlements, but also examined whether the Israeli presence in the West Bank is to be considered an occupation or not.

The report concludes that Israel's presence in the West Bank is not an occupation, and that the Israeli settlements are legal under international law. It recommends the legalization of unauthorized Jewish settlement outposts by the state, and provides proposals for new guidelines for settlement construction.

In May 2014, Haaretz reported that the government was covertly carrying out the recommendations of the Report.

== The committee ==
The three members of the committee are former Israeli Supreme Court justice Edmund Levy, former Foreign Ministry legal adviser Alan Baker and former deputy president of the Tel Aviv District Court Tchia Shapira. According to the Israeli newspaper Haaretz, the "members were meticulously chosen": Levy, who served as deputy mayor of Ramle on behalf of the Likud before being appointed as a Supreme Court judge, was the single minority justice to oppose the 2005 unilateral disengagement from the Gaza Strip, declaring that it violated the rights of the Jewish settlers, Baker who is a resident of the West Bank settlement Har Adar was on the payroll of a settlers' organization which advocates legalization of outposts, and Shapira, the daughter of former Chief Rabbi Shlomo Goren, is a sister-in-law of right-wing ideologue Israel Harel.

== Background ==
The Levy committee was appointed as an advisory committee by the Israeli cabinet in late January 2012, following pressure by settlement leaders. It was to examine legalization of settlement building in the West Bank and to recommend "an appropriate process to clarify land issues in the area", as well as to review the 2005 government report known as the Sasson Report, commissioned by then Prime Minister Ariel Sharon, which had found that several dozen outposts had been built without state approval and on privately owned Palestinian land. The Sasson report's objectivity was questioned after its author, former state prosecutor Talia Sasson, entered politics as a member of the left-wing Meretz party, and as a public board member of the human rights group Yesh Din. However, in addition to its assignment, the Levy committee also examined whether the Israeli presence in the West Bank is an occupation or not.

== Findings and recommendations ==
The Levy Report states that the classical laws of belligerent occupation "as set out in the relevant international conventions cannot be considered applicable to the unique and sui generis historic and legal circumstances of Israel’s presence in Judea and Samaria spanning over decades", and that the 1949 Fourth Geneva Convention against the transfer of populations is not applicable to the Israeli settlement activity in the West Bank, concluding: "Israelis have the legal right to settle in Judea and Samaria and the establishment of settlements cannot, in and of itself, be considered illegal". The assertion that Israel's settlement project is the province of domestic Israeli jurisdiction and not international law is "the most noteworthy, critical, and challenging aspect of the report," according to the Foundation for Middle East Peace.

The report, while recommending the legalization of outposts, is critical of government policies that allowed their establishment, stating "we wish to stress that the picture that has been displayed before us regarding Israeli settlement activity in Judea and Samaria does not befit the behavior of a state that prides itself on, and is committed to, the rule of law". The report notes that unauthorized Jewish building, including some 100 outposts built from 1991 to 2005, had taken place with the help of government offices and ministries, adding that the involvement of governmental agencies in such activity means that "such conduct is to be seen as implied agreement". The committee asks the government to clarify its policy on West Bank Jewish building, and ensure that all future settlement construction proceeds with the proper authorizations and permits "in accordance with the law". It also made a series of recommendations for the retroactive legalisation of constructions built without due permits.

The report calls on the government to allow planning and zoning authorities to complete the authorization process for outposts and unauthorized settler building on state land without any further need for additional political approval, saying that “pending completion of these proceedings and examination of the possibility of granting building permits, the state is advised to avoid carrying out demolition orders, since it brought about the present situation by itself” and suggests that settlements built on land whose status is unclear should be considered “settlements whose legal status is pending”.

The report provides guidelines for settlement construction. These include proposals that

- Only the government or an empowered ministerial committee should establish new settlements.
- Settlements should only be extended beyond their boundary or jurisdiction with the defense minister's approval, and notification of the prime minister.
- Construction within the bounds of an existing or future settlement should only require authorization from the planning and zoning authorities, without government or ministerial approval.
- There should be no prohibition on settler construction within the bounds of a settlement built on land seized by a military order.
- Israelis should be able to directly purchase land in the West Bank, and the procedures to register that land should be accelerated and completed within a reasonable time period.
- The public should be entitled to see data with regard to land rights in the West Bank.

In addition to that, the report recommends

- The establishment of a new court to adjudicate land disputes in the West Bank. Barring that, it suggests that the jurisdiction of district court judges be expanded to allow them to handle these disputes. These new judicial tribunal should settle the land disputes, including issues of Jewish construction on private Palestinian property, before petitions for eviction and demolitions are determined, stating that "pending such determination, state authorities should be instructed to avoid taking any positions in land conflicts and carrying out irreversible measures, such as eviction or demolition of buildings on the property".

== Publication ==
The report was published on 9 July 2012, after it was handed to prime minister Netanyahu in June 2012 and given to members of the Ministerial Committee on Settlements on 8 July 2012. Next, the report was subject to the review and approval of Israeli Attorney General Yehuda Weinstein. Its publication came just days before US Secretary of State Hillary Clinton was to visit the region.

== Implementation of the Levy Report ==
The Netanyahu government was reluctant to adopt the Levy Report. In May 2014, however, Haaretz reported that the Government was covertly carrying out the report's recommendations to ease the settlement of Jews in the West Bank. Besides not to remove settlers from private Palestinian land, the Government was considering setting up a special court for land disputes in the West Bank, thus removing the military from such disputes.

== Reactions ==
=== Palestinian National Authority ===
Nabil Abu Rudaineh, a spokesperson for Palestinian National Authority President Mahmoud Abbas, dismissed the report and called on Israel to stop settlement activities if it is interested in reaching peace. Palestinian officials also noted that the Levy Report was published on the anniversary of the 2004 International Court of Justice′s advisory opinion which determined that Israel's construction of its separation barrier across the Green Line in the West Bank violates international law.

Al Fatah, the PLO′s largest faction headed by Mahmoud Abbas, reportedly issued a statement calling the Levy committee's conclusions a "farce" that "mocked and defied the international community".

In a press release of 18 October 2012, Saeb Erekat, chief Palestinian negotiator, stated that "the Levy Report simply reflects the position of a government that has chosen to turn occupation into annexation and to impose an Apartheid reality in Palestine rather than taking steps to make peace possible".

=== Israel ===
==== Political reactions in Israel ====
Prime Minister Netanyahu praised the report, saying: "In my opinion, this report is important because it deals with the legalization and the legitimization of the settlement enterprise in Judea and Samaria on the basis of facts, a variety of facts and arguments that should be seriously considered", adding that the Ministerial Committee on Settlements would debate and decide the matter. By the time the Knesset dissolved in October 2012 following the call for early elections in January 2013, Netanyahu had not brought the report before the cabinet or the Ministerial Settlements Committee, which would have the power to approve it. Attorney-General Yehuda Weinstein reportedly had issued a general directive asking ministries not to make major policy decisions until the next government is sworn in, without specifically mentioning the Levy Report.

Foreign Minister Avigdor Liberman said he welcomes the report, and hopes the cabinet approves it, adding that "it's not perfect, but it's an important step".

Environmental Protection Minister Gilad Erdan said he "will work to ensure the government adopts the report’s conclusion and give a clear future and stability for tens of thousands of families after dozens of years," adding "finally, legal and historic justice has been done, following the twister political stances based on the Meretz activist Talia Sasson's report".

Interior Minister Eli Yishai praised the report, saying “the time has come to fix the injustice of the Talia Sasson Report and say openly that settlements in Judea and Samaria do not contradict the law, and complement the spirit of Zionism and Judaism".

Science and Technology Minister Daniel Herschkowitz called on Netanyahu to immediately convene the Ministerial Committee on Settlements to adopt the report, which "proves the Sasson report was political from the start to the end".

Public Diplomacy Minister Yuli Edelstein said "as a resident of a settlement in Judea and Samaria and the public diplomacy minister who fights to express the natural right to settle [there] and not apologize for it, I welcome the committee’s findings".

Likud MK Danny Danon welcomed the report, calling it "a gift for communities in Judea and Samaria" and urged the prime minister to act upon the report and to encourage more communities to develop in the West Bank, adding "the report will remove any leftist radicalism from previous court ruling on the outposts and bury once and for all the alarming report previously submitted by attorney Talia Sasson".

Likud MK Tzipi Hotovely, preparing to submit a bill to the Knesset, stated that "the Knesset must approve the report's conclusions, set up an Israeli land registry in Judea and Samaria, set up a court of law for discussing land issues in Judea and Samaria and apply Israeli planning and construction laws in these areas".

National Union MK Arieh Eldad said the report "smashes into pieces the mantra of 'occupation' as far as international law is concerned" and called for an end to the "Muslim occupation of the Land of Israel that began 1300 years ago".

Former Kadima leader Tzipi Livni said that "it is possible and necessary to use the Levy Report for matters of international law, while considering the current reality and continue negotiations on settlement blocs," stating that the future of settlements is a diplomatic matter, not a legal one, and should be based on the possibility of a future peace agreement.

Meretz leader Zehava Gal-On slammed the report, saying that the committee was formed only to "justify the vermin of illegal outposts after the High Court and the Attorney-General were not good enough for Netanyahu", adding "efforts to create a virtual reality will not help Netanyahu. Settlements are not legal, and neither are outposts".

==== Settlement representatives ====
Yesha settlement council chairman Dani Dayan praised the report, saying "it is clear that deep, basic and serious legal work was done. Compared to the Talia Sasson report, this time we're talking about impartial, first rate jurists" and called for the implementation of its recommendations.

After the European Commission published its new guidelines on June 30, 2013, that Israeli governmental and non-governmental entities located over the pre-1967 lines were not eligible for European Union (EU) grants, prizes or funding, the Legal Forum for the Land of Israel, a group of pro-settlement attorneys, urged the Israeli government to pass the Levy Report, stating that "the right answer to the EU is the immediate implementation of the Edmund Levy report to clarify to the Europeans and others that it is not our policy to weaken our legal and historic right to the land".

==== Other Israeli reactions ====
According to David Kretzmer, professor emeritus of International Law at the Hebrew University in Jerusalem, accepting the Levy Report and its conclusion that the West Bank is not under occupation will mean that the Israeli government, no longer able to argue that the territory is subject to a temporary regime of belligerent occupation, will either have to acknowledge that there is a system with elements of apartheid in the West Bank, or it will have to extend political rights to all Palestinian residents of the West Bank.

Israeli historian Ron Pundak who played an important role in starting the Oslo peace process in 1993 argues that the Levy Report is part of a sophisticated plan to alter Israeli public perceptions about Area C, which, as he asserts, is already de facto annexed and 40 percent of which Netanyahu intends to keep, and where Israel is investing notable economics resources to prevent Palestinian development.

As soon as the report's findings were published, social media in Israel were swamped with memes making fun of the fact that apparently there was no occupation.

=== Human rights groups ===
Peace Now director-general Yariv Oppenheimer slammed the composition, findings and recommendations of the committee, saying that “no jurist in the world would refer to this political manifesto as a serious report", adding "the conclusion that there is no occupation proves that the committee members are living in continuous denial”.

B'Tselem rejected the report and pointed out that "almost totally absent from the committee’s report are the 2.5 million Palestinians who live in the West Bank, who are the ones principally harmed by the settlement enterprise", adding that "any recommendation adopted concerning the status and future of the West Bank must address the Palestinians who live there. The Israelis living in the West Bank are Israeli citizens, and as such their rights are protected and they can influence the decisions that shape their fate. The Palestinians in the West Bank, in contrast, live under a military regime and the only law protecting them and their rights is the law of occupation. If the committee’s claim is accepted that Israel is not obliged to act in accordance with these laws, some other normative framework must be offered, one that will meet international legal standards. Ignoring 2.5 million human beings, as the committee proposes to do, is not an option that the State can accept".

The Association for Civil Rights in Israel rejected the findings of the report, saying the conclusions were "legally unfounded and their purpose is to authorize and deepen the injustice that Israeli governments are performing in the Occupied Territories in the past 45 years".

Yesh Din attorney Michael Sfard called the report "not a legal report but an ideological report that ignores the basic principles of the rule of law ... conceived in sin to legalize a crime", adding "the members of the Levy Committee apparently fell down the rabbit hole, and their report was written in Wonderland, governed by the laws of absurdity: there is no occupation, there are no illegal outposts and there is apparently no Palestinian people either. To that we must say in the words of Alice [in Wonderland]: 'This is the silliest tea party I have ever been to'".

In May 2014, Yesh Din published a comprehensive report entitled "Unprecedented". The report analyses the Levy Report in the framework of International Law, Israeli law, Israeli Court rulings, and the Government policy in the past.

=== United States ===
The Obama administration disagreed with the findings of the report. As a spokesperson from the State Department said on the day the report was published: "Obviously, we've seen the reports that an Israeli Government appointed panel has recommended legalizing dozens of Israeli settlements in the West Bank, but we do not accept the legitimacy of continued Israeli settlement activity and we oppose any effort to legalize settlement outposts... We’re concerned about it, obviously".

On December 4, 2014, the portion of the report dealing with international law was introduced into the Congressional Record.

In a press release, the American Jewish Committee (AJC), a centrist American Jewish advocacy organization, affirming its conviction "that Israel’s presence in the West Bank is based on solid legal ground, called on the Israeli government to reject the recommendations of the Levy Commission as a distraction from the ongoing quest for a negotiated two-state solution... If accepted by the government, the commission's findings would offer an unearned excuse for Palestinian resistance to a return to peace talks with Israel – talks Israel is eager to resume, without preconditions. And they would interfere with the message that Prime Minister Netanyahu and previous Israeli governments have sent for the last two decades of a profound commitment to a negotiated two-state solution that will require compromise by both sides. We hope the panel's recommendations will not be adopted".

In a letter initiated and organized by the Israel Policy Forum (IPF), more than 40 prominent American Jewish leaders and philanthropists condemned the report and asked prime minister Netanyahu to "ensure that adoption of this report does not take place". Committee member Alan Baker angrily rebuffed the protest letter, accusing its signatories of "insulting" the committee members, making "incorrect and ill-advised assumptions" and of providing ammunition to those seeking to delegitimize Israel. In response to Baker's letter, IPF executive director David Halperin wrote in an email to Haaretz: "In short, Ambassador Baker seems to have misunderstood the nature of our concerns, which stem from the added impediments the Levy Report poses for achieving a diplomatic solution to the Israeli-Palestinian conflict – not the technical and legal reasoning used to arrive at its conclusions, which is irrelevant to our concern", adding IPF's fear "that the Levy Report will not strengthen Israel's position in this conflict, [and] at this moment, it is more critical than ever that Israel strengthen its claim in the international community that it is committed to a two-state vision, which is, in turn, central to Israel's future as a Jewish and democratic state".

The Zionist Organization of America (ZOA) issued a statement in which it "has praised and endorsed the report" and supports Likut MK "Tzipi Hotovely in her quest to have the Report’s conclusions adopted by the Knesset," adding "the Levy Report is an important and timely document. Not because it tells us something that was not known before – the legality of Jewish settlement in Judea and Samaria, as in any other part of the territory earmarked for Jewish settlement by the 1920 San Remo Conference, is a known but ignored fact. Indeed, the ZOA has frequently pointed out that the San Remo decision has never been superseded by any subsequent, internationally-binding agreement. Rather, it is important that a respected legal commission under the chairmanship of one of the Supreme Court’s retired justices has both reaffirmed this truth as well as making recommendations for avoiding in the future the complications and arbitrary procedures whereby Jewish life and construction in Judea and Samaria have become unnecessarily fraught. This situation has helped contribute to the utterly false notion that Jewish communities in Judea and Samaria are both illegal and an obstacle to peace... We are also pleased that the false, indeed malicious, claim that Jewish settlement and construction beyond the 1949 armistice lines violates the Fourth Geneva Convention has been specifically repudiated. This is the fraudulent basis on which Jewish communities in Judea and Samaria have been called 'illegal'."

In a letter of 2 August 2012, spearheaded by Rabbi Pesach Lerner, Executive Vice President, emeritus of the National Council of Young Israel, 65 American Jewish rabbis, leaders and activists urged Prime Minister Netanyahu to adopt the findings of the Levy Report, saying "We are heartened by the Levy Report’s finding that the 'settlements' in Judea and Samaria are completely legal under international law ... As the Levy Report correctly notes, Israel is not engaged in ‘military occupation’ in relation to the communities in Judea and Samaria. We believe that this conclusion vindicates the Israeli government, which has been unjustifiably vilified by many in the international community, simply because there are Jews living in this particular area of the Jewish State," continuing "like you, we recognize and respect the fact that the Jewish people have inalienable rights to the land of Israel which stem from the Bible, and we are familiar with the historic legacy of the movement of Ze’ev Jabotinsky, Menachem Begin, and Herut/Likud, which you now lead, that has long endorsed Jewish rights in the entirety of the land of Israel". The letter also rejects the Israel Policy Forum's stance, stating "Despite assertions to the contrary, the conclusions of the Levy Report do not ‘place … the prestige of Israel as a democratic member of the international community, in peril.’ We categorically reject this absurd declaration and sincerely hope and pray that you do the same".

=== International Committee of the Red Cross ===
In November 2012, Juan Pedro Schaerer, head of the International Committee of the Red Cross′s (ICRC) delegation for Israel and the Occupied Territories issued a statement on behalf of ICRC "in its role as guardian of international humanitarian law" in response to the Levy Report's "misrepresentation" of a "commentary published by the International Committee of the Red Cross on the Fourth Geneva Convention," which the Levy Report "uses to support the argument that the Israeli settlement project does not entail a breach of international humanitarian law". Quoting the Hague Regulations of 1907 according to which a "territory is considered occupied when it is actually placed under the authority of the hostile army" the ICRC statement clarifies that

"[f]or the purpose of the law of occupation, it is sufficient that the state whose army established effective control over the territory was not itself the rightful sovereign of the place when the conflict broke out. Nowhere in the law of occupation can one find the suggestion that only territory whose title is clear and uncontested can be considered occupied for the purposes of international humanitarian law. Indeed, it would be in complete contravention of the humanitarian purpose of such law to deprive people living under occupation of the protection afforded by the law because of disputes between belligerents regarding sovereignty over the territory concerned.

The West Bank is under the effective control of Israel. Israel acquired this control through a military campaign and maintains it through military force. Even those who hold that Israel has 'a claim to sovereign rights' in the West Bank cannot claim that Israel was the rightful sovereign of the territory when it seized control over it. Accordingly, contrary to what is claimed in the Levy report, it is manifestly clear that the West Bank is occupied by Israel. Indeed, the Israeli Supreme Court has repeatedly and consistently ruled that the territory of the West Bank is subject to belligerent occupation.

Furthermore, concerning the settlements in the West Bank, it has to be emphasized that Article 49 (6) of the Fourth Geneva Convention, which prohibits a state from transferring parts of its own civilian population to territory it occupies, does not merely prohibit the occupying state from forcefully transferring parts of its population; it also prohibits any action by the occupier which facilitates such transfer.

The ICRC commentary on the Fourth Geneva Convention makes clear that Article 49 (6), like the convention as a whole, aims to protect the local population in the occupied territory and not the population of the occupying state. Furthermore, international humanitarian law prohibits any action by an occupying power aimed at altering the intrinsic characteristics of the occupied territory, including any measures that affect its demographic, cultural or social composition.

Contrary to what the Levy report maintains, from the viewpoint of international law the West Bank is occupied by Israel. This assertion, like the ICRC's position that the Israeli settlements in the West Bank are unlawful, is based entirely on the relevant provisions of international humanitarian law".
