= Hanan Melcer =

Justice of the Supreme Court of Israel

- חָנָן מֶלְצֶר
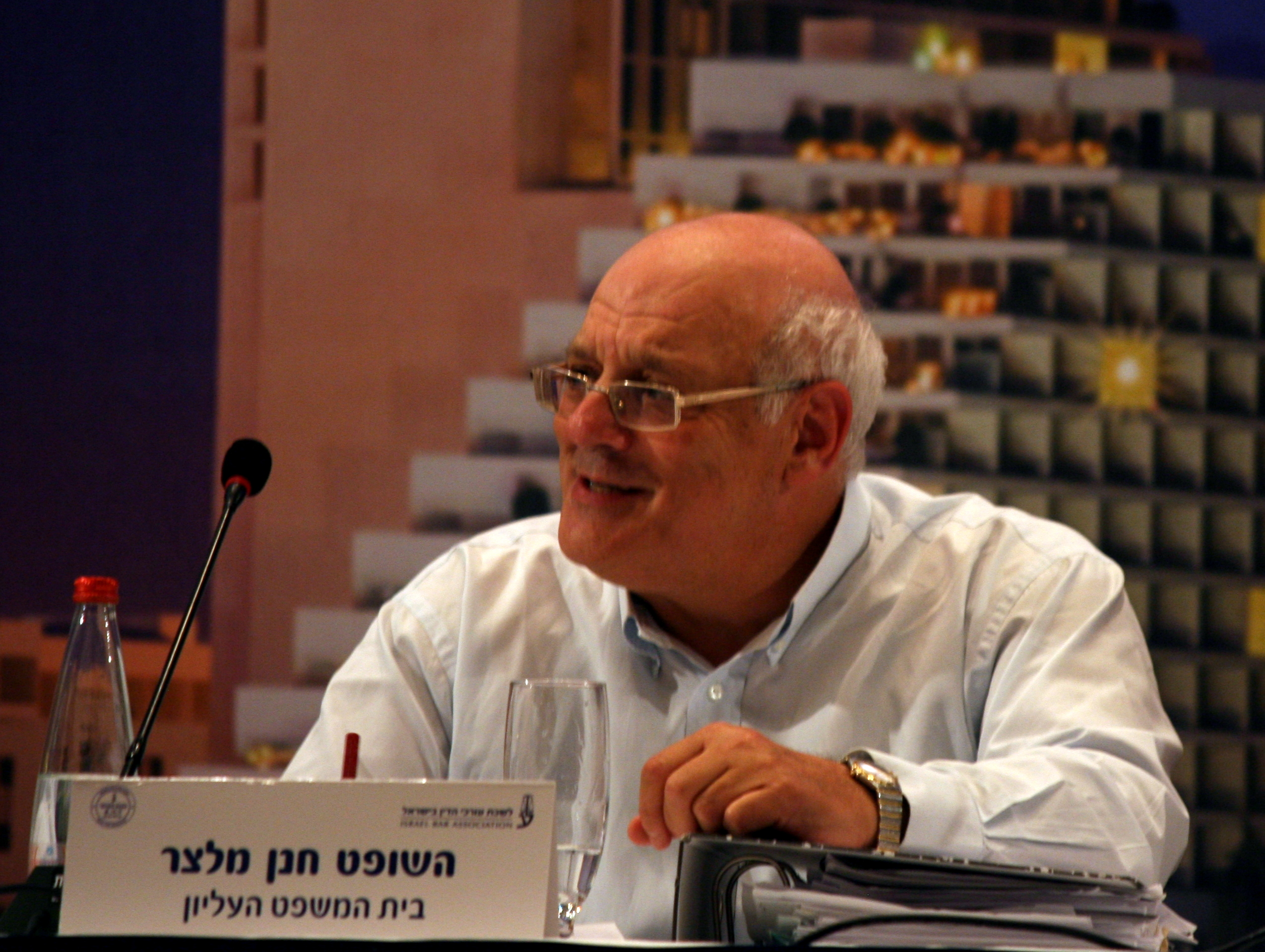

Justice of the Supreme Court of Israel
- In office 24 June 2007 – 12 April 2021

Personal details
- Born: April 12, 1951 (age 75) Tel Aviv, Israel
- Education: Tel Aviv University
- Profession: Lawyer, judge

Hanan Melcer (Hebrew: חָנָן מֶלְצֶר; born 12 April 1951) is an Israeli judge who served as a justice on the Supreme Court of Israel and Deputy Chief Justice.

== Biography ==
Hanan Melcer was born in Tel Aviv to Holocaust survivors from Poland. He attended high school at the Herzliya Hebrew Gymnasium, and studied law at Tel Aviv University in the Atuda program, where he also later taught as a Law Professor. Melcer received BA in law with honors and a master's degree in statutory law. After graduating, he enlisted in the IDF in the Military Advocate General's Office, serving as a military prosecutor and reaching the rank of lieutenant colonel.

== Political and legal career ==
In 1977, he founded his own law firm dealing in infrastructure, communications, corporate, banking, antitrust, securities, and administrative law. As an attorney, he handled the legal aspects of some of Israel's largest infrastructure projects.

In the 1970s, he was active in Dash and was a fierce opponent of the coalition with Begin and his right-wing Likud party in 1977. He was a legal adviser to the Rabin camp of the Labor Party in 1980. Later, he was involved with the Shinui party. In 1996 he also ran in the primaries for the Labor Party, where he later served as the influential chairman of its legal committee until he resigned in 2004, after his name came up as a candidate for the Supreme Court.

On 24 June 2007 he was selected by the Judicial Committee to serve as a judge on the Supreme Court. His appointment was historical because it was the first time in decades that a lawyer from the private sector was chosen, and it was part of the judicial shakeup initiated by Justice Minister Daniel Friedmann.

On 27 August 2007, he was sworn in as a justice of the Supreme Court by the President Shimon Peres.

Melcer was part of the decision by the Supreme Court in 2009 to order the government to demolish illegally built Palestinian homes in the West Bank. He was also one of the judges in the controversial ruling on the Immanuel Beit Yaakov controversy.

== See also ==
- Israeli law
