= Sasson Report =

Official Israeli government report

The Sasson Report is an official Israeli government report published on 8 March 2005 that concluded that Israeli state bodies had been discreetly diverting millions of shekels to build West Bank settlements and outposts that were illegal under Israeli law. The report was commissioned by the Prime Minister Ariel Sharon, and was headed by the former head of the State Prosecution Criminal Department Talia Sasson. Talia Sasson would later run for the Israeli elections as part of the left wing party Meretz.

== The report ==
The report detailed how officials in the Ministry of Defense and Ministry of Housing and Construction and the settlement division of the World Zionist Organization spent millions of shekels from state budgets to support the unauthorized outposts. The Sasson report called it a "blatant violation of the law" and said "drastic steps" were needed to rectify the situation. It describes secret cooperation between various ministries and official institutions to consolidate "wildcat" outposts, which settlers began erecting more than a decade ago. Sasson added that the problem was ongoing, saying "the process of outpost expansion is profoundly under way."

The report states:

- The housing ministry supplied 400 mobile homes for outposts on private Palestinian land.
- The defense ministry approved the positioning of trailers to begin new outposts.
- The education ministry paid for nurseries and their teachers.
- The energy ministry connected outposts to the electricity grid.
- Roads to outposts were paid for with taxpayers' money.

The report mentioned 150 communities in the West Bank with incomplete or nonexistent permits, but Sasson cautions that this list was not exhaustive, due to the lack of cooperation of some ministries and government offices which, according to her, failed to hand over some important documents. She recommended that the Housing Ministry be stripped of authority over construction of settlements in the West Bank, and that this power be transferred to the cabinet. The Housing Minister at the time of the tabling the report, Isaac Herzog (Labor), said following the release of the report that every expense earmarked for the settlements would subsequently need the approval of the Ministry's director-general. Up until then, the heads of each department at the Ministry had been able to sign off on expenses for various construction and infrastructure matters at the settlements.

The settlement expansion initiative was backed by Sharon when he was Foreign Minister under Binyamin Netanyahu. In 1998 Sharon publicly urged settlers to seize hilltops in order to break up the contiguity of Palestinian areas and prevent the establishment of a Palestinian state, saying: "Let everyone get a move on and take some hilltops! Whatever we take, will be ours, and whatever we don't take, will not be ours!" The report did not mention Sharon, however. Nevertheless, the report prompted calls that Sharon and other former and current government officials face legal repercussions for their alleged official involvement in the funding of illegal settlements.

Settler leaders have rejected criticism of illegality and wrongdoing, protesting that they were participating in officially sanctioned community planning initiatives.

According to the Sasson Report, the establishment of an outpost requires government approval. However, such a regulation was not put in place until 6 December 2004, when Attorney General Menachem Mazuz issued the directive. Until then, according to the Legal Forum for the Land of Israel, a group of pro-settlement attorneys, the status of an outpost was regulated in accordance with Government Resolution 150 from 2 August 1996, which stipulated that the Defense Minister had the authority to authorize new outpost communities.

According to the Land of Israel Legal Forum, nearly all of the Jewish neighborhoods deemed "unauthorized" by Talia Sasson were established before Mazuz's 2004 stipulation and are therefore, in fact, legally authorized. Such an argument has yet to be legally established.

Sasson recommended that Sharon consider criminal investigations against those suspected of involvement.

== Reactions ==
Palestinian officials reacted angrily to the report. "It is time for the international community to say 'enough' to Israel and work with the same determination as on other matters," said Palestinian Prime Minister Ahmed Qurei. A US embassy spokesman in Tel Aviv also repeated Washington's longstanding call for Israel to remove the outposts.

Settler leader Shaul Goldstein said Mr Sharon should be the one to face questioning over the report's findings, adding "It's obvious that the one who sent us in order to protect the roads and land is the prime minister so he should look in the mirror. Mr Sharon has to be questioned - not us." According to the Haaretz newspaper, Herzog claimed that "the main responsibility for the building of illegal outposts in recent years falls with my predecessor, Effi Eitam and his director general." He also added that when he took up the position earlier this year, he ordered that no funds be transferred to the illegal outposts, as well as the establishment of a joint Defense Ministry and Prime Minister's Office team to coordinate the budgets for the settlements. Eitam replied in reaction to the report and the associated comments, saying that all illegal outposts he had approved during his time in office were approved in coordination with Prime Minister Ariel Sharon, had his full backing and were sometimes initiated by him. Eitam claimed that Talia Sasson was not an objective surveyor and that the report was politically motivated.

== Peace Now report ==
In November 2006, the Israeli NGO Peace Now published a report which they claimed to be mostly based on the same government data as used by Sasson. According to the report, almost 40% of the land area of West Bank settlements is privately owned by Palestinians. However, in 2007 Peace Now released partially reduced figures estimating 32.4% of the land "held" for the West Bank settlements is privately owned by Palestinians. According to Peace Now, 24% of the land on which the settlements are actually built is Palestinian property.

== See also ==
- Israeli settlement
- Levy Report
