= Edmond Levy (judge) =

Israeli Supreme Court Justice

- אדמונד לוי
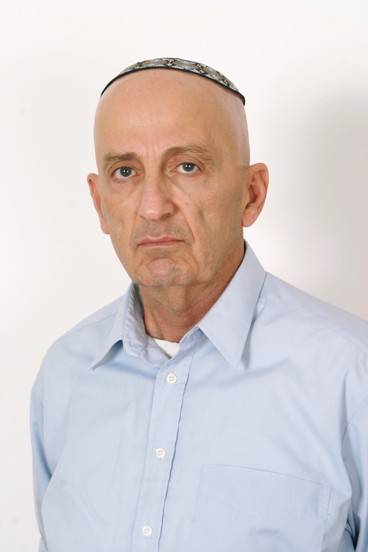
- Born: 11 October 1941; Basra, Iraq
- Died: March 11, 2014
- Education: Tel Aviv University (Law)
- Occupations: Judge, Supreme Court of Israel
- Years active: 1970–2012
- Title: Justice

Edmond Eliyahu Levy (Hebrew: אדמונד אליהו לוי; October 11, 1941 – March 11, 2014) was an Israeli judge of the Supreme Court of Israel and member of the Judicial Selection Committee. In January 2012, he was appointed by Prime Minister Benyamin Netanyahu to head a three-member committee to examine the legal aspects of land ownership in the West Bank. The committee′s report, usually referred to as the "Levy Report", was published in July 2012.

== Biography ==
Levy was born in Basra, Iraq on October 11, 1941. He emigrated to Israel with his parents at the age of 10. He grew up in Ramat Gan, where he finished high school in 1958. After completing his military service in 1961, he worked at the Ramla Magistrate's Court while studying law at Tel Aviv University. He also served as Vice-Mayor of Ramla for the Likud party. In 1969, he completed his law studies and opened his own office in Tel Aviv after receiving his law license in 1970. He became a military judge in 1977, a Magistrate judge in 1979, and a District judge in Tel Aviv in 1984.

Levy was appointed to the Supreme Court in August 2001 along with Ayala Procaccia. According to Haaretz, Levy, who wore a kippah, was seen as representing Religious Zionists, while Procaccia represented secular views.

On March 24, 2008, Levy was elected by the Supreme Court justices to serve on the Judicial Selection Committee, replacing Vice-President Eliezer Rivlin.

In January 2012, after retiring from the Supreme Court, Levy was appointed by Prime Minister Benyamin Netanyahu to head a three-member committee to examine land ownership in the West Bank and review the 2005 Sasson Report. The committee's 89-page report, known as the Levy Report, was published on July 9, 2012. The report reaffirmed aspects of the Sasson Report but concluded that the West Bank is not "occupied territory" and that outposts considered illegal should be legitimized. The report's scope was limited to reviewing building in the West Bank and it endorsed "the traditional Israeli position that the Fourth Geneva Conventions...does not apply de jure to the 'West Bank', and in any event does not bar Israeli settlements." The report also considered the rules of "belligerent occupation" of the West Bank, which, according to the report, the International Committee of the Red Cross Conference reaffirmed as applying only to territory sovereign upon capture, which it argued is not the case with the West Bank.

== Legal views and rulings ==
Levy's main expertise was in criminal law. He presided over the trial of Yigal Amir, the assassin of Yitzhak Rabin. He also wrote the ruling in Ze'ev Rosenstein's extradition case, establishing the legality of extraditing Israeli citizens for offenses connected to foreign territories.

Levy was considered an activist judge, intervening in administrative and governmental decisions, including Knesset laws. He was the sole dissenting judge against cuts to guaranteed income allowances, arguing for the right to a dignified existence. He also overturned the practice of tying migrant workers' legal status to their employers.

He wrote a dissenting opinion against ten colleagues regarding the 2005 disengagement from the Gaza Strip, arguing for the annulment of the Evacuation-Compensation Law and the entire pullout. A memorial to Levy was recently installed at the Gush Katif Museum following the Knesset vote in favor of returning to Homesh and Northern Samaria. The Times of Israel noted that Levy was known for his legal scholarship and willingness to hold minority opinions.
