= The Legal Forum for the Land of Israel =

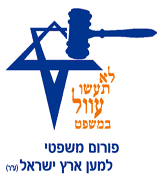
The Legal Forum's logo

The Legal Forum for the Land of Israel (Hebrew: הפורום המשפטי למען ארץ ישראל) is a professional legal non-governmental organization incorporating hundreds of lawyers and jurists, aiming to preserve Israel's democratic and Zionist identity, to ensure sound governance, and to balance between the legislative, executive and judicial powers of government in order to protect human rights and promote national interests through legal, parliamentary and public actions.

It is an Israeli political and civil rights group that was founded in 2004 and registered in 2005 headed by Nachman Eyal, one of the leaders in the struggle against the Israeli disengagement from Gush Katif in the Gaza Strip. In its self description, the organization states that it "is committed to protecting human rights in Israel, ensuring sound government, and preserving the national integrity of the State of Israel and the Jewish people," carrying out its activities "by professional attorneys, legal and financial experts volunteering their time, as well as student volunteers who are committed to social and political change."

Considered a "right wing" organization by liberal media such as The Times of Israel and Haaretz, the Legal Forum has become an established institution working for change through the Israeli national court system as part of The Shield of Israel, a group of "nationalist Zionist organizations working together to introduce Zionist and Jewish nationalist values to Israeli society."

== History ==
According to the organization's website the Legal Forum for the Land of Israel was established in September 2004. However, in an interview with The Jewish Press, Nachman (Nachi) Eyal, the organization's founder, dates the founding "within a few weeks" after November 2004, when the Israeli government announced its intention to evict the Jewish settlers from Gush Katif. Not accepting the inactivity of the Yesha Council, the settlers organization, he placed an advertisement in a weekly newsletter looking for lawyers who would volunteer to oppose the Israeli disengagement from the Gaza Strip, to which he says forty lawyers responded, forming the bases for the Legal Forum.

Supporting the human rights of the Jewish settlers evacuated from the Gaza Strip and parts of Samaria, the Legal Forum submitted a petition to the High Court of Justice against the forced relocation and dispossession of Jewish Israeli citizens, participated in Knesset committees drafting the law without being able to bring about any changes, and filed several suits with the Supreme Court to improve the financial situation of former Gush Katif residents, costing the state an estimated NIS 2 billion, according to Eyal, thus establishing itself as an advocacy group working for change through the Israeli court system.
