= List of Likud Knesset members =

This is a list of Likud Knesset Members by the sessions of the Knesset (the Israeli parliament) in which they served (place on Likud list is given in brackets):

== 8th Knesset Likud Members (January 21, 1974 – May 17, 1977) ==
Zalman Abramov; Moshe Arens; Yoram Aridor; Yohanan Bader; Yedidia Be'eri; Menachem Begin; Meir Cohen-Avidov; Geula Cohen; Yigal Cohen^{1}; Haim Corfo; Mates Drobles; Leon Dycian; Simha Erlich; Yehezkel Flomin; Pesach Grupper; Benjamin Halevi^{2}; Igael Hurvitz; Avraham Katz; Haim Kaufman; Ben-Zion Keshet; Joseph Kremerman; Haim Landau; David Levy; Tzita Linker^{4}; Amnon Linn; Eitan Livni; Yitzhak Moda'i; Amal Nasser el-Din^{5}; Moshe Nissim; Akiva Nof^{3} ^{5}; Ehud Olmert; Gideon Patt; Yitzhak Peretz; Elimelech Rimalt; Hillel Seidel^{6}; Yitzhak Shamir; Ariel Sharon^{1}; Abraham Shechterman; Eliezer Shostak; Zalman Shoval; Yosef Tamir; Shmuel Tamir^{3} ^{4}; Menahem Yedid; Abraham Yoffe

1 Ariel Sharon left the Knesset on December 23, 1974. He was replaced by Yigal Kohen.
2 Benjamin Halevi left Likud on March 18, 1975.
3 They left Likud on October 26, 1976, to create the Free Center faction
4 Shmuel Tamir left the Knesset on January 25, 1977. He was replaced by Zita Linker.
5 Akiva Nof left the Knesset on January 25, 1977. He was replaced by Amal Nasereldeen.
6 Joined Likud on February 15, 1977.

== 9th Knesset Likud Members (May 17, 1977 – June 30, 1981) ==
Moshe Arens; Yoram Aridor; Elyakim Badian; Menachem Begin; Yitzhak Berman; Meir Cohen-Avidov; Yigal Cohen-Orgad; Geula Cohen; Yigal Cohen; Haim Corfo; Michael Dekel; Sarah Doron; Simha Erlich; Yehezkel Flomin; Pesach Grupper; Igael Hurvitz; Yitzhak Yitzhaky; Moshe Katsav; Avraham Katz; Haim Kaufman; David Levy; Amnon Linn; Eitan Livni; Moshe Meron; Roni Milo; Yitzhak Moda'i; Amal Nasereldeen; Moshe Nissim; Akiva Nof; Ehud Olmert; Gideon Patt; Yitzhak Peretz; Shmuel Rechtman; Yosef Rom; Menachem Savidor; Hillel Seidel; Moshe Shamir; Yitzhak Shamir; Avraham Sharir; Ariel Sharon; Dov Shilansky; Eliezer Shostak; Zalman Shoval; David Stern; Yosef Tamir; Ezer Weizman; Mordechai Zipori

== 10th Knesset Likud Members (June 30, 1981 – July 23, 1984) ==
Moshe Arens; Yoram Aridor; Menachem Begin; Eliahu Ben Elissar; Yitzhak Berman; Meir Cohen-Avidov; Yigal Cohen-Orgad; Yigal Cohen; Haim Corfo; Michael Dekel; Sarah Doron; Simha Erlich; Miriam Glazer-Taasa; Pinhas Goldstein; Pesach Grupper; Avraham Hirschson; Moshe Katsav; Haim Kaufman; Michael Kleiner; Eliezer Kulas; David Levy; Amnon Linn; Eitan Livni; David Magen; Yaakov Meridor; Ronny Milo; Yitzhak Moda'i; Amal Nasereldeen; Moshe Nissim; Akiva Nof; Ehud Olmert; Gideon Patt; Yehuda Perah; Yitzhak Peretz; Michael Reisser; Zvi Rener; Josef Rom; Menachem Savidor; Isaac Seyger; Benny Shalita; Yitzhak Shamir; Avraham Sharir; Ariel Sharon; Meir Sheetrit; David Shiffman; Dov Shilansky; Eliezer Shostak; Dan Tichon; Ariel Weinstein; Dror Zeigerman; Mordechai Zipori

== 11th Knesset Likud Members (July 23, 1984 – November 1, 1988) ==
Aharon Abuhatssira; Moshe Arens; Yoram Aridor; Eliahu Ben Elissar; Meir Cohen-Avidov; Yigal Cohen-Orgad; Yigal Cohen; Haim Corfo; Michael Dekel; Sarah Doron; Michael Eitan; Ovadia Eli; Gideon Gadot; Miriam Glazer-Taasa; Pinhas Goldstein; Pesach Grupper; Igael Hurvitz; Moshe Katsav; Haim Kaufman; Eliezer Kulas; Uzi Landau; David Levy; Uriel Lynn; David Magen; Joshua Matza; Dan Meridor; Ronny Milo; Yitzhak Moda'i; David Mor; Amal Nasereldeen; Moshe Nissim; Ehud Olmert; Gideon Patt; Michael Reisser; Isaac Seyger; Benny Shalita; Yaakov Shamay; Yitzhak Shamir; Avraham Sharir; Ariel Sharon; Meir Sheetrit; Dov Shilansky; Eliezer Shostak; Dan Tichon; Ariel Weinstein

== 12th Knesset Likud Members (November 1, 1988 – June 23, 1992) ==
Aharon Abuhatssira; Shaul Amor; Moshe Arens; Benny Begin; Eliahu Ben Elissar; Yigal Cohen; Haim Corfo; Sarah Doron; Michael Eitan; Ovadia Eli; Gideon Gadot; Yosef Goldberg; Pinhas Goldstein; Pesach Grupper; Efraim Gur; Tzachi Hanegbi; Igael Hurvitz; Moshe Katsav; Haim Kaufman; Michael Kleiner; Uzi Landau; David Levy; Limor Livnat; Uriel Lynn; David Magen; Joshua Matza; Dan Meridor; Ronny Milo; Yitzhak Moda'i; Benjamin Netanyahu; Moshe Nissim; Ehud Olmert; Gideon Patt; Yehuda Perah; Reuven Rivlin; Yehoshua Sagi; Yaakov Shamay; Yitzhak Shamir; Avraham Sharir; Ariel Sharon; Dov Shilansky; Zalman Shoval; Dan Tichon; Ariel Weinstein

== 13th Knesset Likud Members (June 23, 1992 – May 29, 1996) ==
Yosef Ahimeir; Shaul Amor; Assad Assad; Benny Begin; Eliahu Ben Elissar; Naomi Blumenthal; Michael Eitan; Ovadia Eli; Efraim Gur; Tzachi Hanegbi; Avraham Hirschson; Moshe Katsav; Haim Kaufman; Uzi Landau; David Levy; Limor Livnat; David Magen (Monsonego); Joshua Matza; David Mena; Dan Meridor; Ronny Milo; Ron Nachman; Benjamin Netanyahu; Moshe Nissim; Ehud Olmert; Gideon Patt; Michael Ratzon; Silvan Shalom; Yaakov Shamay; Yitzhak Shamir; Ariel Sharon; Meir Sheetrit; Dov Shilansky; Dan Tichon; Ariel Weinstein

== 14th Knesset Likud Members (May 29, 1996 – May 17, 1999) ==
Shaul Amor; Naomi Blumenthal; Ze'ev Boim; Michael Eitan; Gideon Ezra; Tzachi Hanegbi; Avraham Hirschson; Moshe Katsav; Yisrael Katz; Uzi Landau; Limor Livnat; Joshua Matza; Benjamin Netanyahu; Reuven Rivlin; Silvan Shalom; Ariel Sharon; Meir Sheetrit; Doron Shmueli; Dan Tichon

== 15th Knesset Likud Members (May 17, 1999 – January 28, 2003) ==
Moshe Arens; Naomi Blumenthal; Ze'ev Boim; Eli Cohen; Michael Eitan; Gideon Ezra; Tzachi Hanegbi; Abraham Hirschson; Ayoob Kara; Moshe Katsav; Yisrael Katz; Uzi Landau; Yechiel Lasry; Limor Livnat; Tzipi Livni; Joshua Matza; Ronny Milo; Dan Naveh; Benjamin Netanyahu; Reuven Rivlin; Silvan Shalom; Ariel Sharon; Meir Sheetrit; Yuval Steinitz

== 16th Knesset Likud Members (January 28, 2003 – April 17, 2006) ==
Eli Aflalo; Ruhama Avraham; Ronnie Bar-On; Daniel Benlulu; Naomi Blumenthal; Ze'ev Boim; Yuli Edelstein; Yaakov Edri; Michael Eitan; Gilad Erdan; Gideon Ezra; Gila Gamliel; Inbal Gavrieli; Michael Gorlovsky; Tzachi Hanegbi^{1}; Yehiel Hazan; Avraham Hirschson; Moshe Kahlon; Ayoob Kara; Haim Katz; Yisrael Katz; Uzi Landau; David Levy; Limor Livnat; Tzipi Livni; David Mena^{2}; Leah Ness; Dan Naveh; Benjamin Netanyahu; Ehud Olmert; Michael Ratzon; Reuven Rivlin; Pnina Rosenblum^{1}; Gideon Sa'ar; Silvan Shalom; Ariel Sharon; Omri Sharon^{2}; Meir Sheetrit; Yuval Steinitz; Marina Solodkin; Majalli Wahabi; Ehud Yatom

1 Tzachi Hanegbi resigned from the Knesset on 10 December 2005 and was replaced by Pnina Rosenblum.
2 Omri Sharon resigned from the Knesset on 5 January 2006 and was replaced by David Mena.

== 17th Knesset Likud Members (April 17, 2006 – February 24, 2009) ==
Yuli-Yoel Edelstein^{2}; Michael Eitan (6); Gilad Erdan (4); Moshe Kahlon (3); Haim Katz^{1}; Yisrael Katz (12); Limor Livnat (10); Dan Naveh (8)^{2}; Binyamin Netanyahu (1); Yossi Peled (16); Reuven Rivlin (7); Gideon Sa'ar (5); Silvan Shalom (2); Natan Sharansky (11)^{1}; Yuval Steinitz (9)

1 Natan Sharansky resigned from the Knesset on November 20, 2006 and was replaced by Haim Katz.
2 Dan Naveh resigned from the Knesset on February 25, 2007 and was replaced by Yuli-Yoel Edelstein

== 18th Knesset Likud Members (February 24, 2009 – February 5, 2013) ==
Ofir Akunis (26); Benny Begin (5); Danny Danon (24); Yuli-Yoel Edelstein (13); Michael Eitan (16); Ze'ev Elkin (20); Gilad Erdan (3); Gila Gamliel (19); Tzipi Hotovely (18); Moshe Kahlon (6); Ayoob Kara (23); Haim Katz (15); Yisrael Katz (12); Yariv Levin (21); Limor Livnat (14); Dan Meridor (17); Leah Ness (11); Binyamin Netanyahu (1); Zion Pinyan (22); Miri Regev (27); Reuven Rivlin (4); Gideon Sa'ar (2); Silvan Shalom (7); Carmel Shama (25); Yuval Steinitz (10); Moshe Ya'alon (8)

== 19th Knesset Likud Members (February 5, 2013 – March 31, 2015) ==
Benjamin Netanyahu; Gilad Erdan; Silvan Shalom; Yisrael Katz; Danny Danon; Moshe Ya'alon; Ze'ev Elkin; Tzipi Hotovely; Yariv Levin; Yuli-Yoel Edelstein; Haim Katz; Miri Regev; Moshe Feiglin; Yuval Steinitz; Tzachi Hanegbi; Limor Livnat; Ofir Akunis; Gila Gamliel

== 20th Knesset Likud Members (March 31, 2015 – April 9, 2019) ==
Benjamin Netanyahu; Gilad Erdan; Yuli Edelstein; Yisrael Katz; Miri Regev; Silvan Shalom^{2}; Moshe Ya'alon^{3}; Ze'ev Elkin; Danny Danon^{1}; Yariv Levin; Benny Begin; Tzachi Hanegbi; Yuval Steinitz; Gila Gamliel; Ofir Akunis; David Bitan; Haim Katz; Jackie Levy^{4}; Yoav Kish; Tzipi Hotovely; Dudu Amsalem; Miki Zohar; Anat Berko; Ayoob Kara; Nava Boker; Avi Dichter; Avraham Neguise; Nurit Koren; Yaron Mazuz; Oren Hazan; Sharren Haskel; Amir Ohana; Yehuda Glick; Osnat Mark

1 Danny Danon resigned in August 2015 and was replaced by Sharren Haskel
2 Silvan Shalom resigned in December 2015 and was replaced by Amir Ohana
3 Moshe Ya'alon resigned in May 2016 and was replaced by Yehuda Glick
4 Jackie Levy resigned in November 2018 and was replaced by Osnat Mark

== 21st Knesset Likud Members (April 9, 2019 – October 3, 2019) ==
Benjamin Netanyahu; Yuli Edelstein; Yisrael Katz; Gilad Erdan; Gideon Sa'ar; Miri Regev; Yariv Levin; Yoav Gallant; Nir Barkat; Gila Gamliel; Avi Dichter; Ze'ev Elkin; Haim Katz; Tzachi Hanegbi; Ofir Akunis; Yuval Steinitz; Tzipi Hotovely; Dudu Amsalem; Amir Ohana; Ofir Katz; Eti Atiya; Yoav Kish; David Bitan; Keren Barak; Shlomo Karhi; Miki Zohar; Sharren Haskel; Michal Shir; Keti Shitrit; Fateen Mulla; May Golan; Uzi Dayan; Ariel Kellner; Osnat Mark

== 22nd Knesset Likud Members (October 3, 2019 – March 2, 2020) ==
Benjamin Netanyahu; Yuli Edelstein; Yisrael Katz; Gilad Erdan; Gideon Sa'ar; Miri Regev; Yariv Levin; Yoav Gallant; Nir Barkat; Gila Gamliel; Avi Dichter; Ze'ev Elkin; Haim Katz; Tzachi Hanegbi; Ofir Akunis; Yuval Steinitz; Tzipi Hotovely; Dudi Amsalem; Amir Ohana; Ofir Katz; Eti Atiya; Yoav Kish; David Bitan; Keren Barak; Shlomo Karhi; Miki Zohar; Sharren Haskel; Michal Shir; Keti Shitrit; Eli Cohen; Moshe Kahlon;Yifat Shasha-Biton;

== 23rd Knesset Likud Members (March 2, 2020 – present) ==
Benjamin Netanyahu; Yuli Edelstein; Yisrael Katz; Gilad Erdan; Gideon Sa'ar; Miri Regev; Yariv Levin; Yoav Gallant; Nir Barkat; Gila Gamliel; Avi Dichter; Ze'ev Elkin; Haim Katz; Tzachi Hanegbi; Ofir Akunis; Yuval Steinitz; Tzipi Hotovely; Dudi Amsalem; Amir Ohana; Ofir Katz; Eti Atiya; Yoav Kish; David Bitan; Keren Barak; Shlomo Karhi; Miki Zohar; Sharren Haskel; Michal Shir; Keti Shitrit; Eli Cohen; May Golan;Yifat Shasha-Biton; Tali Ploskov; Gadi Yevarkan; Uzi Dayan; Fateen Mulla; Ariel Kellner (Joined mid season)
