= Michael Ratzon =

Israeli politician

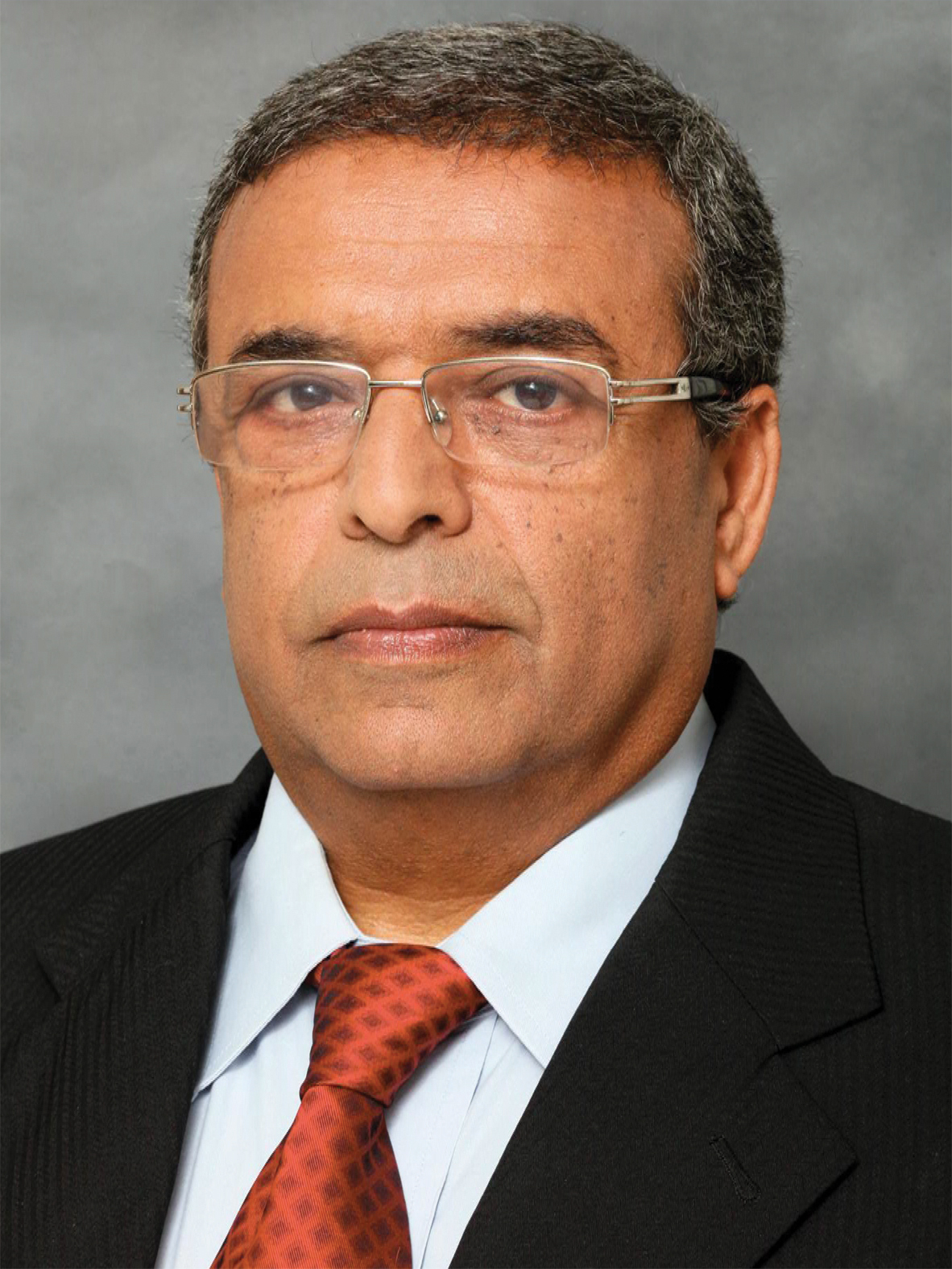
- Ratzon in 2014

Faction represented in the Knesset
- 1996: Likud
- 2003–2006: Likud

Personal details
- Born: 21 September 1952 (age 74) Petah Tikva, Israel

Michael Ratzon (Hebrew: מיכאל רצון; born 21 September 1952) is an Israeli former politician who briefly served as a member of the Knesset for the Likud in 1996 and again from 2003 until 2006.

== Biography ==
Born in Petah Tikva, Ratzon gained an LLB and an MA in law from Bar-Ilan University, before working as an attorney.

For the 1992 Knesset elections he was placed 35th on the Likud list, but the party won only 32 seats. However, he entered the Knesset on 10 March 1996 as a replacement for the deceased Ariel Weinstein. Three months later he lost his seat following the May 1996 elections.

For the 2003 elections he was placed 20th on the Likud list, and entered the Knesset when the party won 38 seats. Whilst an MK he served as a member of several committees; the House Committee, the Finance Committee, the Constitution, Law and Justice Committee, the Public Petitions Committee, and was a member of the Parliamentary Inquiry Committee for Uncovering Corruption in the Government System. On 5 March 2003 he was appointed Deputy Minister of Industry, Trade and Labour, but was sacked by Ariel Sharon in October 2004 for voting against the Gaza disengagement plan.

Prior to the 2006 elections he was placed 33rd on the Likud list, and lost his seat when the party won only 12 mandates.

During Israel Katz's term as transportation minister, Ratzon was appointed as the chairman of NTA, which is responsible for the Tel Aviv Light Rail project.
