= Keren Barak =

Israeli lobbyist and politician

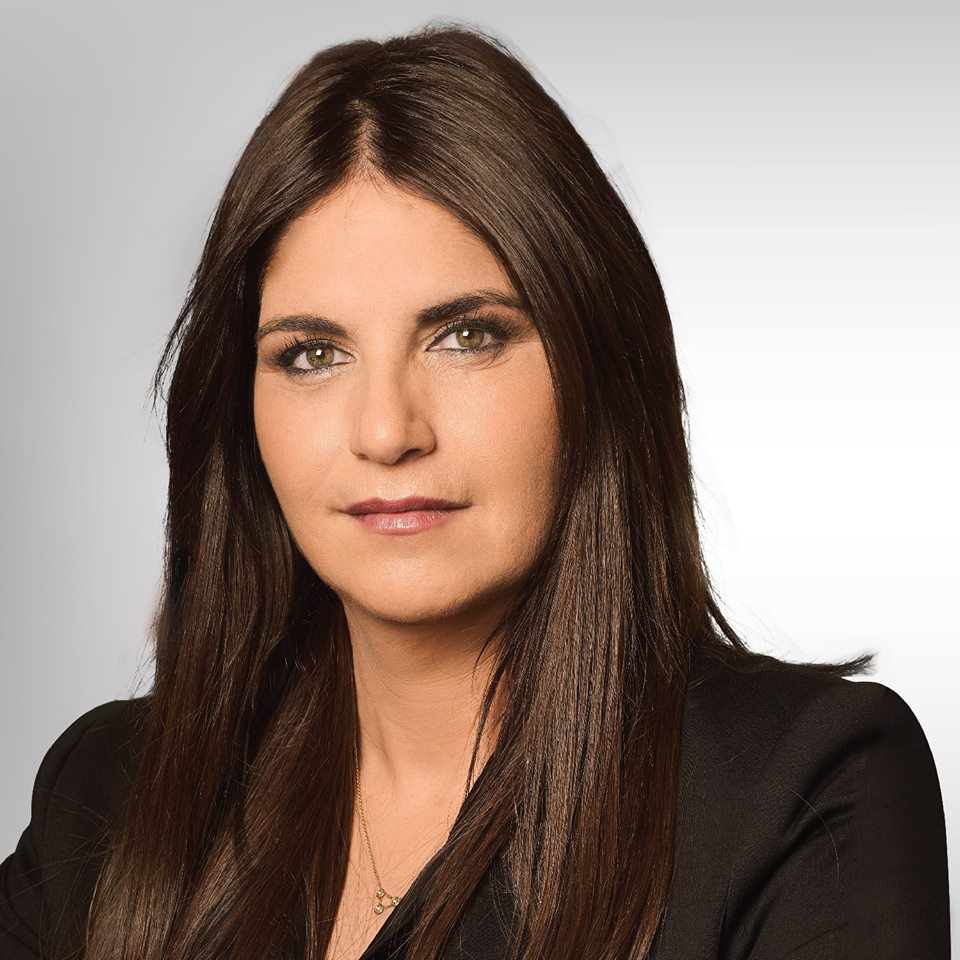
- Barak in 2019

Faction represented in the Knesset
- 2019–2022: Likud

Personal details
- Born: 20 September 1972 (age 53) Haifa, Israel

Keren Barak (Hebrew: קרן ברק; born 20 September 1972) is an Israeli lobbyist and politician. She was a member of the Knesset for Likud from 2019 to 2022.

== Biography ==
Born in Haifa to parents who had immigrated from Egypt and Poland, Barak served as an infantry instructor and commanded new recruits and armoured personnel carriers during her national service in the Israel Defense Forces. She studied for a BA in communications and administration at the College of Management Academic Studies and then earned an MBA at the Hebrew University of Jerusalem. She subsequently became a faculty member at the Interdisciplinary Center Herzliya.

Barak later worked as a Knesset advisor, and as a lobbyist for several companies, including Cellcom and the Port of Haifa. In 2018 she made the news as the result of a run-in with Likud MK Yoav Kish in a Knesset debate on child custody in which Kish claimed she had threatened him.

Barak was placed thirty-second on the Likud list for the 2009 elections, but the party won only 27 seats. In 2013 she was forty-seventh on the joint Likud Yisrael Beiteinu list, which won 31 seats. However, after being placed twenty-fourth on the Likud list for the April 2019 elections, she was elected to the Knesset as Likud won 36 seats. She was re-elected in September 2019 and 2020.

In 2020 Barak attacked two fellow Likud MKs, Osnat Mark and May Golan, on the Knesset floor, saying "You [Golan] are not worth the heel on my shoe. Not you, and not the retarded blonde [Mark]." Barak's office initially denied the conversation had occurred, then when confronted with the recording assailed her colleagues for providing it to the press and airing "dirty laundry." She was re-elected in 2021, but lost her seat in the 2022 elections after being placed forty-eighth on the Likud list.
