= Israel Katz =

Israeli politician (born 1955)

- יִשְׂרָאֵל כַּ״ץ
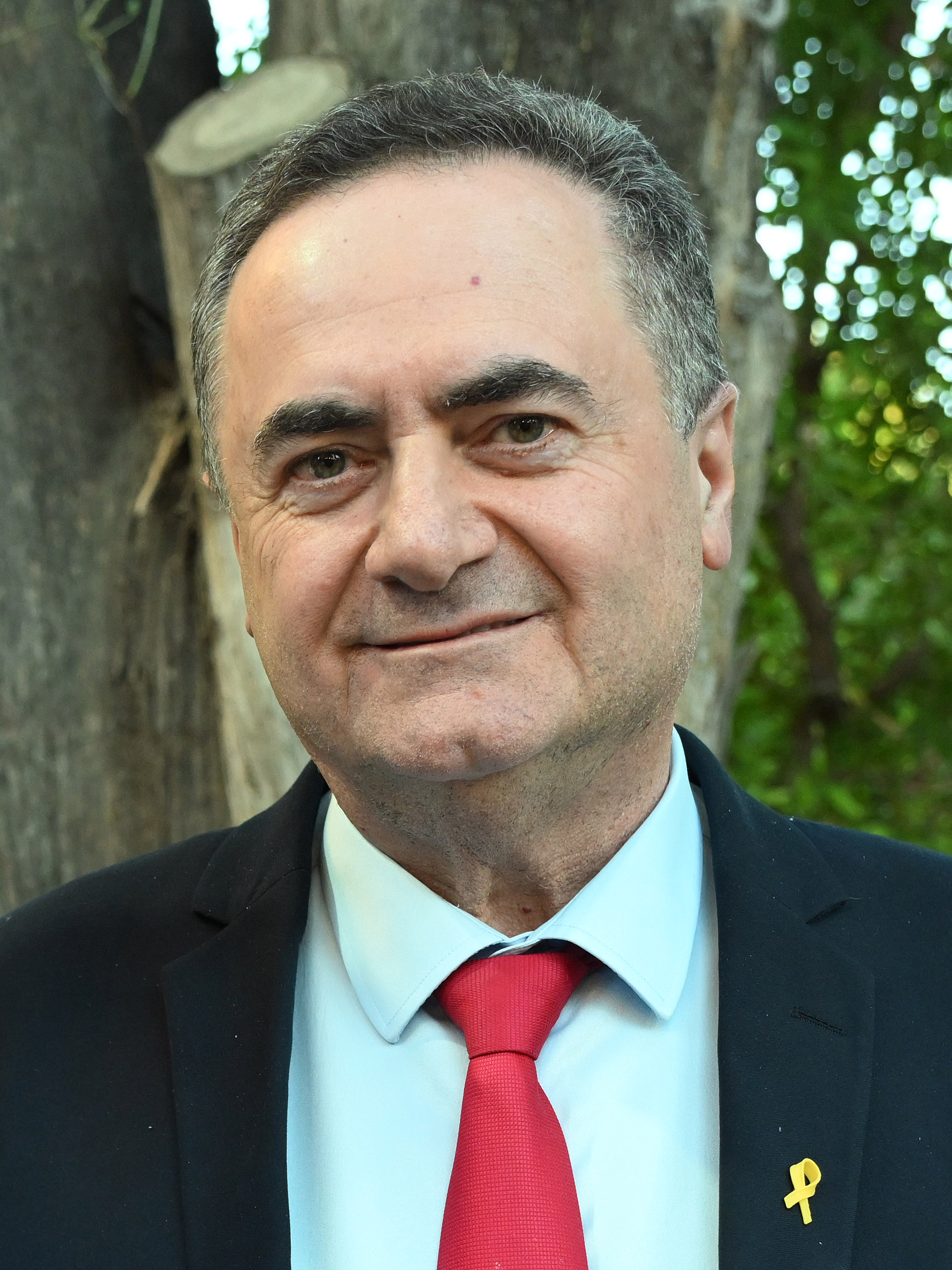
- Katz in 2024

Ministerial portfolios
- 2003–2006: Agriculture
- 2009–2019: Transport
- 2015–2020: Intelligence
- 2019–2020: Foreign Affairs
- 2020–2021: Finance
- 2022–2024: Energy
- 2024: Foreign Affairs
- 2024–present: Defense

Faction represented in the Knesset
- 1998–present: Likud

Personal details
- Born: 21 September 1955 (age 71) Ashkelon, Israel
- Education: Hebrew University of Jerusalem (BA, MA)

Israel Katz (Hebrew: יִשְׂרָאֵל כַּ״ץ; born 21 September 1955) is an Israeli politician and member of the Knesset for Likud currently serving as Minister of Defense and a member of the Security Cabinet of Israel. Katz has been recognized for his role in modernizing Israel's transportation infrastructure, including the expansion of highways, the development of high-speed rail, and reforms to Israel's ports that increased competition and reduced shipping costs. Katz has previously served as Minister of Agriculture, Minister of Transport, Minister of Intelligence, Minister of Energy, Minister of Finance, and twice as Minister of Foreign Affairs. On 5 November 2024, it was announced that he would be nominated by Prime Minister Benjamin Netanyahu as Defense Minister after Yoav Gallant was dismissed.

== Biography ==
Israel Katz was born in Ashkelon. His parents, Meir Katz and Malka ((Nira) née Deutsch), were Holocaust survivors from the region of Maramureș, Romania. He was raised on Moshav Kfar Ahim. He was drafted into the Israel Defense Force in 1973 and served in the Paratroopers Brigade as a soldier and squad leader. In 1976, he completed Officer Candidate School and returned to the Paratroopers Brigade as a platoon leader. After his discharge in 1977, he studied at the Hebrew University of Jerusalem and graduated with a Bachelor of Arts and Master of Arts. In the early 1980s, he was the chairman of the students' union. In March 1981, he was suspended for a year for his participation in a protest against Arab violence on campus that included locking the rector, Raphael Mechoulam, in his room.

Katz is married and has two children.

== Political career ==
Katz was first listed on 45th on Likud list on 1992 Israeli legislative election, but missed out when Likud only won 32 seats. Katz won 34th place on the Likud-Gesher-Tzomet list for the 1996 elections, but missed out on a place in the Knesset when the alliance won only 32 seats. However, he entered the Knesset in November 1998 as a replacement for Ehud Olmert. He was re-elected in 1999 and 2003, and was appointed Minister of Agriculture in Ariel Sharon's government in 2003. Katz left the cabinet in January 2006 after the Likud–Kadima split, and was re-elected in the 2006 elections.

In January 2004, Katz announced a plan to substantially increase the number of settlers in the Golan Heights. In March 2004, he suggested making a referendum among all registered members of Likud, which allowed Ariel Sharon, intent on mobilising public opinion to back his Gaza disengagement plan, to get round opposition within the Likud convention, dominated by Israeli settler pressure groups. Katz along with Benjamin Netanyahu, Silvan Shalom and Limor Livnat announced that they would resign from the government within two weeks if Sharon did not agree to hold a national referendum on the pull out plan. In the same period, he lobbied, together with the World Zionist Organization, to have $32 million set aside to provide incentives and subsidies for settlements in the West Bank.

In March 2007, the Israel Police recommended indicting Katz on charges of fraud and breach of trust linked to political appointments at the Ministry of Agriculture during his tenure as minister. The report found 24 seasonal ministry employees were members of the Likud Central Committee or were children of committee members. The police transferred their investigative material to the central district prosecution. Later attorney general declined to prosecute.

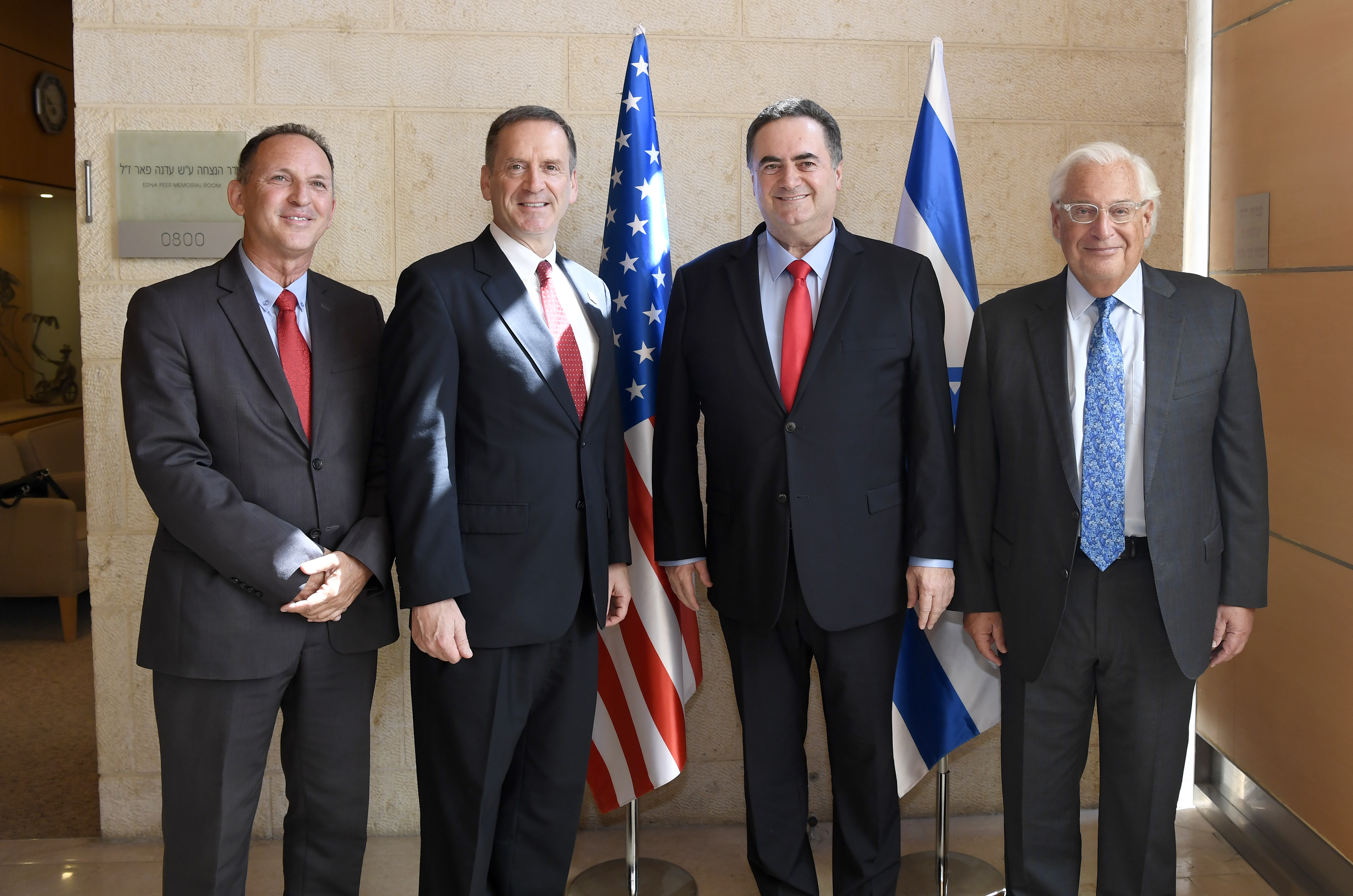
Katz with US Ambassador to Israel David M. Friedman (right) in August 2019

Katz ran for Leader of the Likud in December 2005, winning 8.7% of the vote.

In the 2009 elections and after winning 11th place on the Likud list, Katz retained his seat and was appointed Minister of Transportation in the Netanyahu government. In July 2009, he decided to replace existing road signs in Israel with new ones so that all the names appearing on them in English and Arabic would be a direct transliteration of their Hebrew names, instead of being directly in English and Arabic.

In February 2010, Katz was ordered by the High Court of Justice to issue instructions based on a committee's findings that gender segregation in public buses was illegal and that separate seating could not be coerced, as Haredis were doing. Katz, undertaking to implement the recommendations, responded that the buses could carry signs suggesting that gender segregation was voluntary. The Haredi community considered this failure of enforcement a victory. Judges from the High Court of Justice criticized Katz's decision to allow continued operation of sex-segregated buses.

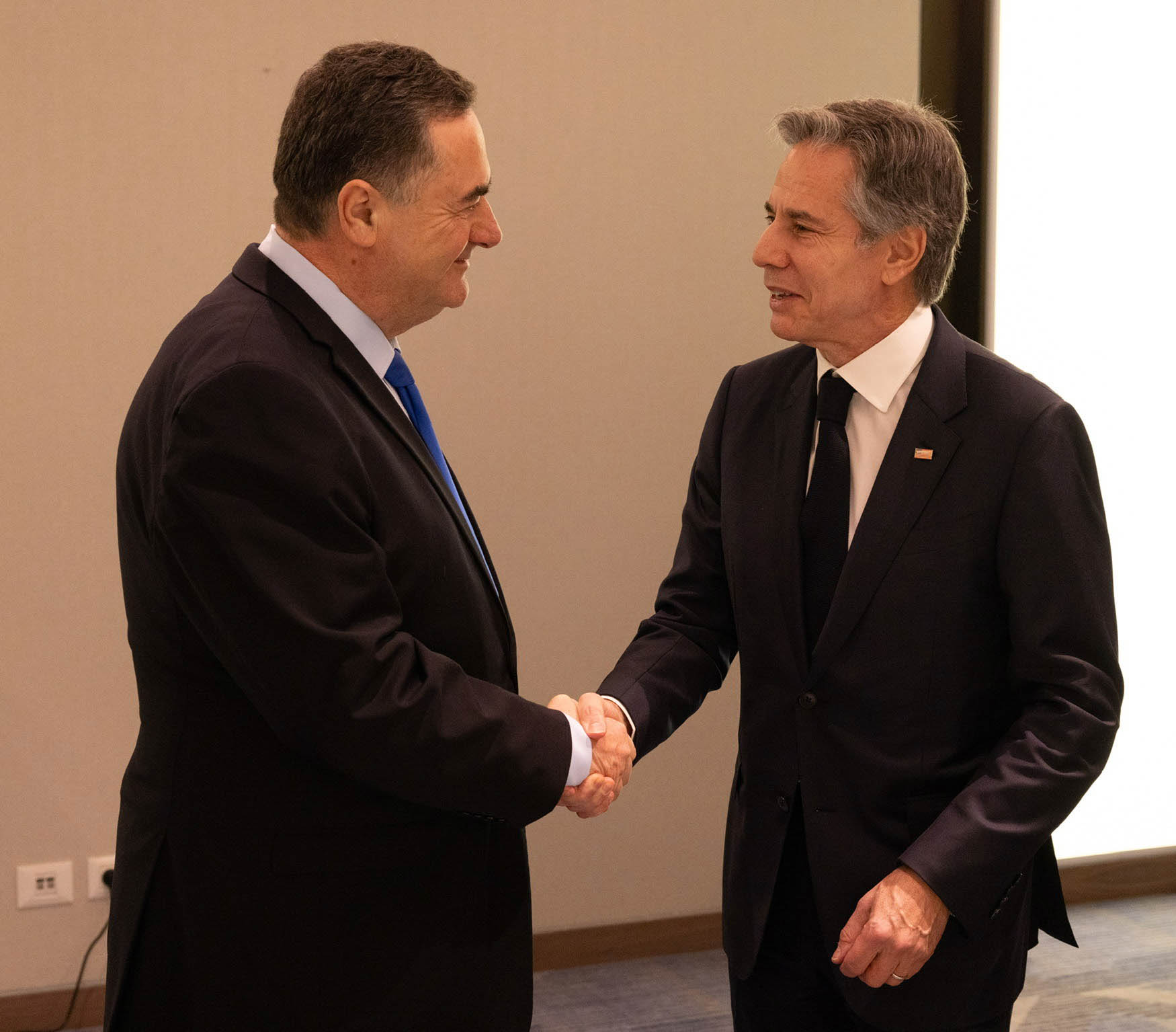
Katz with US Secretary of State Antony Blinken in Tel Aviv, Israel, 9 January 2024

In July 2011, Katz confirmed that the state subsidizes bus tickets within West Bank settlements, causing them to be cheaper than tickets for rides within the Green Line. According to Katz, the move was intended to incentivize settlers to use armor-protected public transportation within the West Bank, which would ostensibly reduce state spending on stationing military and security escorts for non-armored, private vehicles.

Katz was re-elected in 2013 and remained Minister of Transportation in the new government. After being placed fourth on the Likud list, he was re-elected in 2015, after which he was appointed Minister of Intelligence in the new government, as well as remaining Minister of Transportation.

In February 2019, Katz assumed the position of Minister of Foreign Affairs.

On 17 May 2020, Katz became Minister of Finance when the Thirty-fifth government of Israel was sworn in.

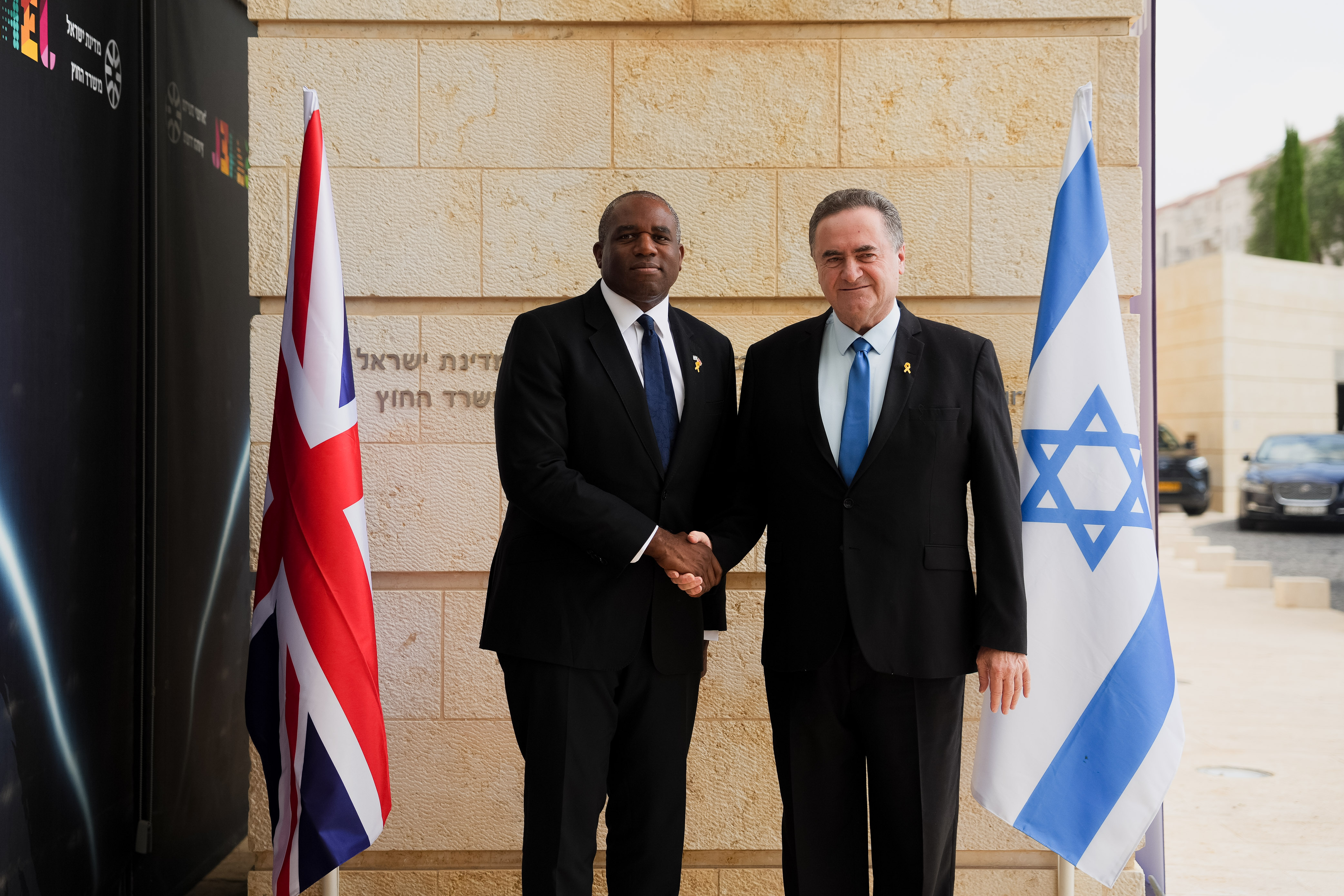
Katz with UK Foreign Secretary David Lammy in Jerusalem, 15 July 2024

He supported the Israeli blockade of the Gaza Strip. On 13 October 2023, Katz, then Minister of Energy and Infrastructure, stated on X: "We will fight the terrorist organization Hamas and destroy it. All the civilian population in [G]aza is ordered to leave immediately. We will win. They will not receive a drop of water or a single battery until they leave the world."

On 1 January 2024, Katz assumed the role of the Minister of Foreign Affairs for the second time, following the Knesset's approval of a power-sharing agreement that led to the replacement of Eli Cohen.

In July 2024, he attended the 2024 NATO Summit in Washington, D.C. Katz warned of the Iran-Russia alliance and the dangers posed by Iran and China, and also met with the foreign ministers of Denmark, the Netherlands, the Czech Republic, the United States, Germany, South Korea and Canada.

In February 2025, Katz instructed the IDF to prepare a plan to "allow any resident of Gaza who wishes to leave to do so", saying, "Countries such as Spain, Ireland, Norway, and others, which have falsely accused Israel over its actions in Gaza, are legally obligated to allow Gazans to enter their territory. Their hypocrisy will be exposed if they refuse." Spain and Ireland rejected Katz's proposal. Katz also suggested that Palestinians from Gaza should immigrate to Canada because Canada has a "structured immigration program."

During the Israeli invasion of Syria following the fall of the Assad regime in December 2024, Israel took control of the U.N.-patrolled UNDOF buffer zone on Syrian territory, a move that violated the 1974 disengagement agreement with Syria. In February 2025, Israel Katz said that Israeli forces would remain in southern Syria "for an indefinite period of time to protect our communities and thwart any threat."

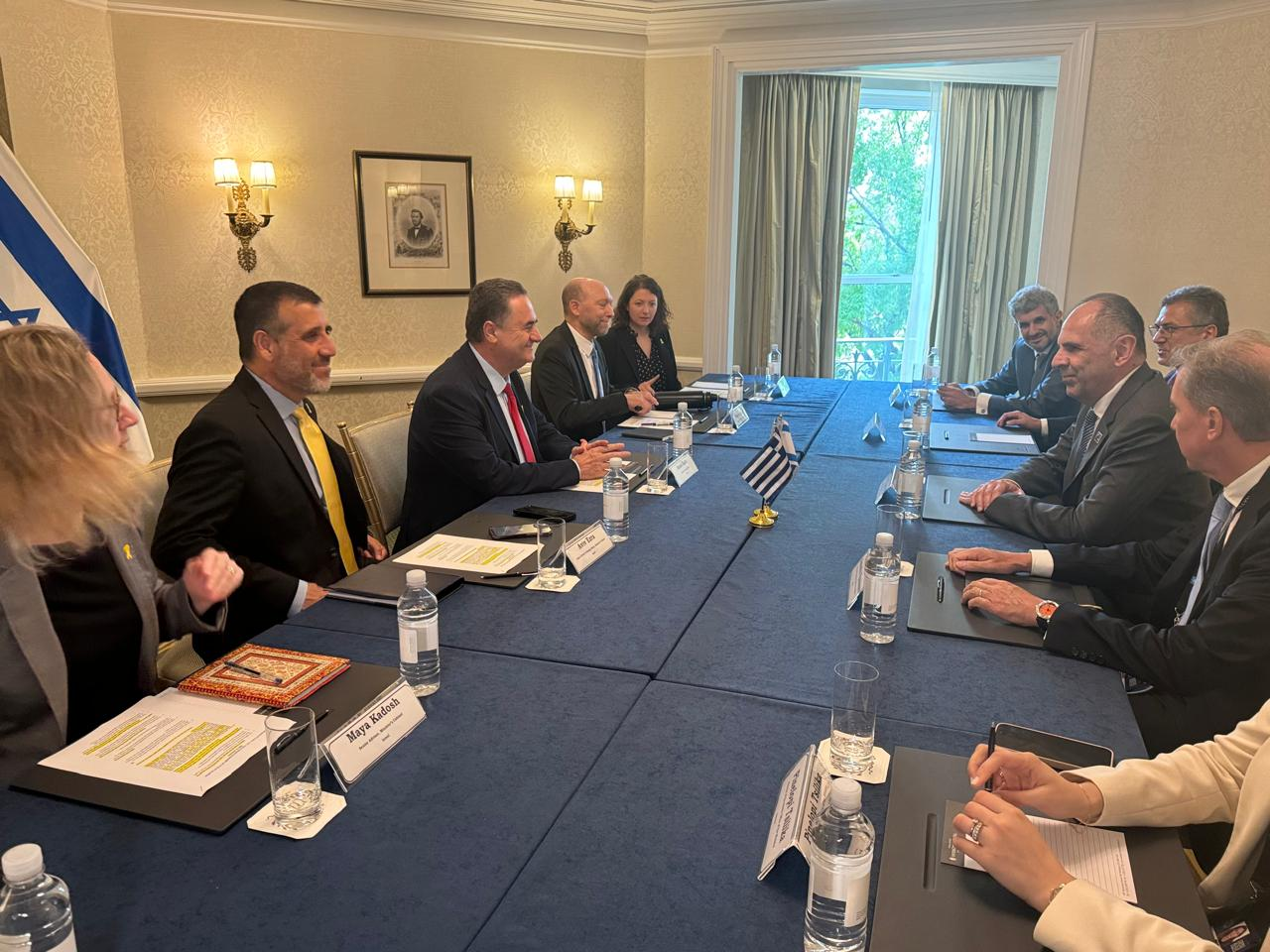
Katz with Greek Foreign Minister Giorgos Gerapetritis at the 2024 Washington NATO summit

In March 2025, Katz condemned the massacres of Syrian Alawites committed by pro-government fighters during clashes in western Syria and characterized Syrian President Ahmed al-Sharaa (referred to by Katz under his nom de guerre "Al-Julani") as "a jihadist terrorist from the Al-Qaeda school, committing atrocities against the Alawite civilian population." Katz affirmed Israel's intention to maintain control of Mount Hermon and other security areas, defend communities in the Golan and Galilee regions, ensure southern Syria's demilitarization, and defend the local Druze population.

On 19 March 2025, Katz warned Gaza residents in a video broadcast: "Return the hostages and eliminate Hamas, and other options will open up for you — including going to other places in the world for those who wish. The alternative is complete destruction and devastation." In April 2025, Katz said that Israeli troops would remain in Gaza, Lebanon, and Syria indefinitely. He announced that large areas of Gaza would be "incorporated into Israel's security zones" and that Israeli military operations in Gaza would include a "large-scale evacuation of Gaza's population from combat zones."

Katz supported the blockade of humanitarian aid to Gaza, saying on 16 April 2025: "No one is currently planning to allow any humanitarian aid into Gaza, and there are no preparations to enable such aid." After the Israeli attack on the Gaza European Hospital in May 2025, Katz declared: "We will not allow the Hamas terrorist organization to use hospitals and humanitarian facilities in Gaza as shelters and terrorist headquarters."

On 8 June 2025, Katz ordered the Israeli military to prevent the June Gaza Freedom Flotilla's vessel Madleen from coming ashore on Gaza. He called Greta Thunberg, one of the passengers on board, antisemitic. He ordered that members of the flotilla be shown footage of the October 7 attacks.

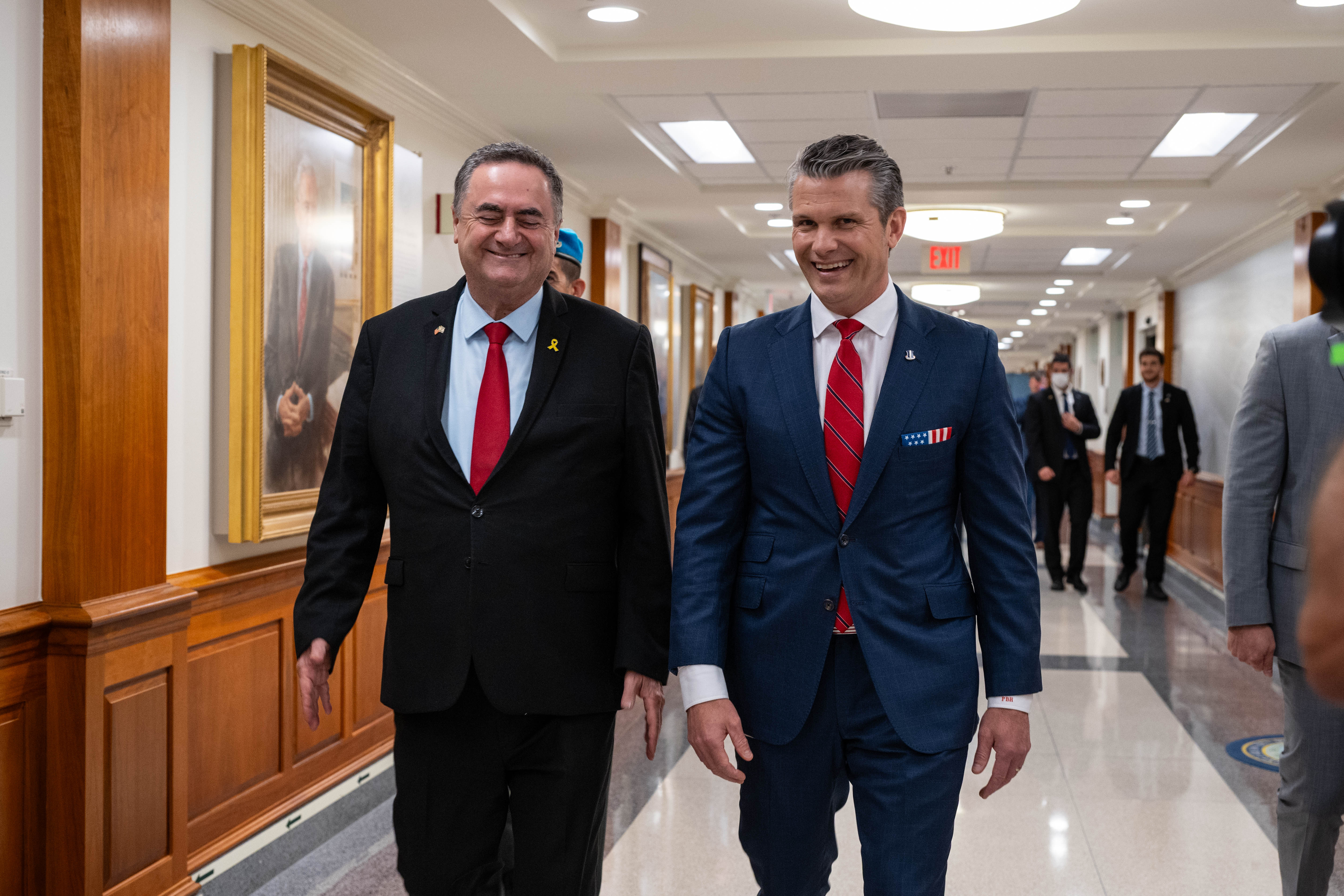
Katz and Secretary of Defense Pete Hegseth at the Pentagon, 18 July 2025

Following Iranian retaliatory strikes on Israel in response to Israeli strikes on Iran in June 2025, Katz said that Iran had crossed red lines by targeting civilians, adding that it would pay a very high price for that. Katz warned that "Tehran will burn" if Iran continues to fire missiles at Israel. He also said that Iran's supreme leader, Ali Khamenei, "cannot continue to exist".

In September 2025, Katz threatened to unleash "ten biblical plagues on Egypt" on the Houthis after the Houthis increased their missile attacks against Israel in response of a previous airstrike launched by Israel.

Katz was charged in absentia with genocide and crimes against humanity in November 2025 by the Turkish prosecutor's office, which issued an international arrest warrant for him. The prosecutor accused Katz and other Israeli officials of systematic attacks on civilian populations in Gaza, including the bombing of hospitals and infrastructure, and of intercepting aid convoys in international waters.

On 24 March 2026, as part of the ongoing 2026 Iran War, Katz announced that Israel would occupy the south of Lebanon up to the Litani River to serve as what he described a "defensive buffer", an announcement which came after calls from Bezalel Smotrich for Israel to annex the area. On 31 March, Katz announced plans to demolish residential structures in Lebanese villages near the border and prevent the return of approximately 600,000 displaced residents to southern Lebanon. Since the Israeli offensive against Hezbollah began on 2 March 2026, more than 1.2 million people have been displaced and over 1,200 killed in Lebanon. Amid continued diplomatic efforts, Katz announced that the IDF would "intensify and expand" attacks against Iranian military infrastructure.

=== Hacking incident ===
On 11 September 2025, an unnamed Turkish hacking group was able to obtain his phone number and managed to have a brief video call with him. During the call, one of the hackers hurled insults at Katz and took a screenshot before Katz ended the interaction. The Turkish group also published an image showing several messages that were sent to Katz on WhatsApp, with the first message stated in Hebrew: "Hey Katz, never forget this, your death is near, we are the defenders of Qassam, we will bury you and your country in history," referring to the Al-Qassam Brigades, the military wing of Hamas. Two other messages in Turkish were sent to Katz before being blocked read: "What the hell happened?" and "Did you block me, dog?"

== Views and opinions ==
=== Peace and security ===
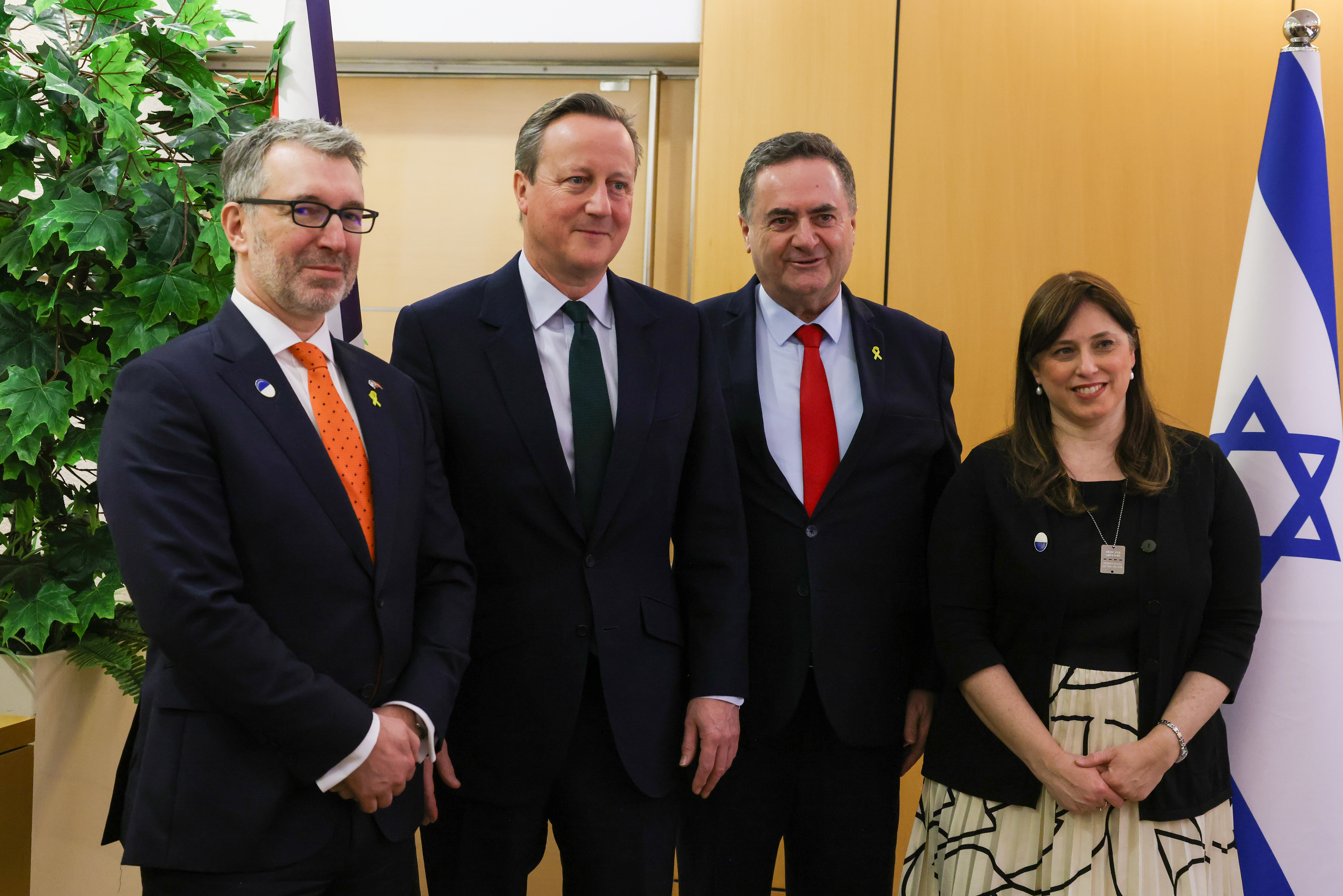
Katz with Tzipi Hotovely and UK Foreign Secretary David Cameron in Jerusalem, 24 January 2024

On peace and security matters, Katz is considered to be a hardliner in the Israeli government. He takes an annexationist view of the West Bank: he supports continued settlement construction, extending full Israeli sovereignty to the West Bank, and severing all relations with the Palestinian Authority. He opposes the two-state solution and the creation of a Palestinian state in any form, which he regards as unacceptable considering "our rights to this land". Instead, Katz favors the creation of an autonomous Palestinian entity "with Jordanian civil and political affiliation", and connecting the Gaza Strip to Egypt. He opposes any territorial retreat from the Golan Heights, captured from Syria during the Six-Day War, deeming it "an integral part of Israel and vital for its security and protection."

In 2024, Katz declared United Nations Secretary-General António Guterres persona non grata in Israel for not condemning the October 2024 Iranian strikes against Israel in a statement on the Middle East conflict.

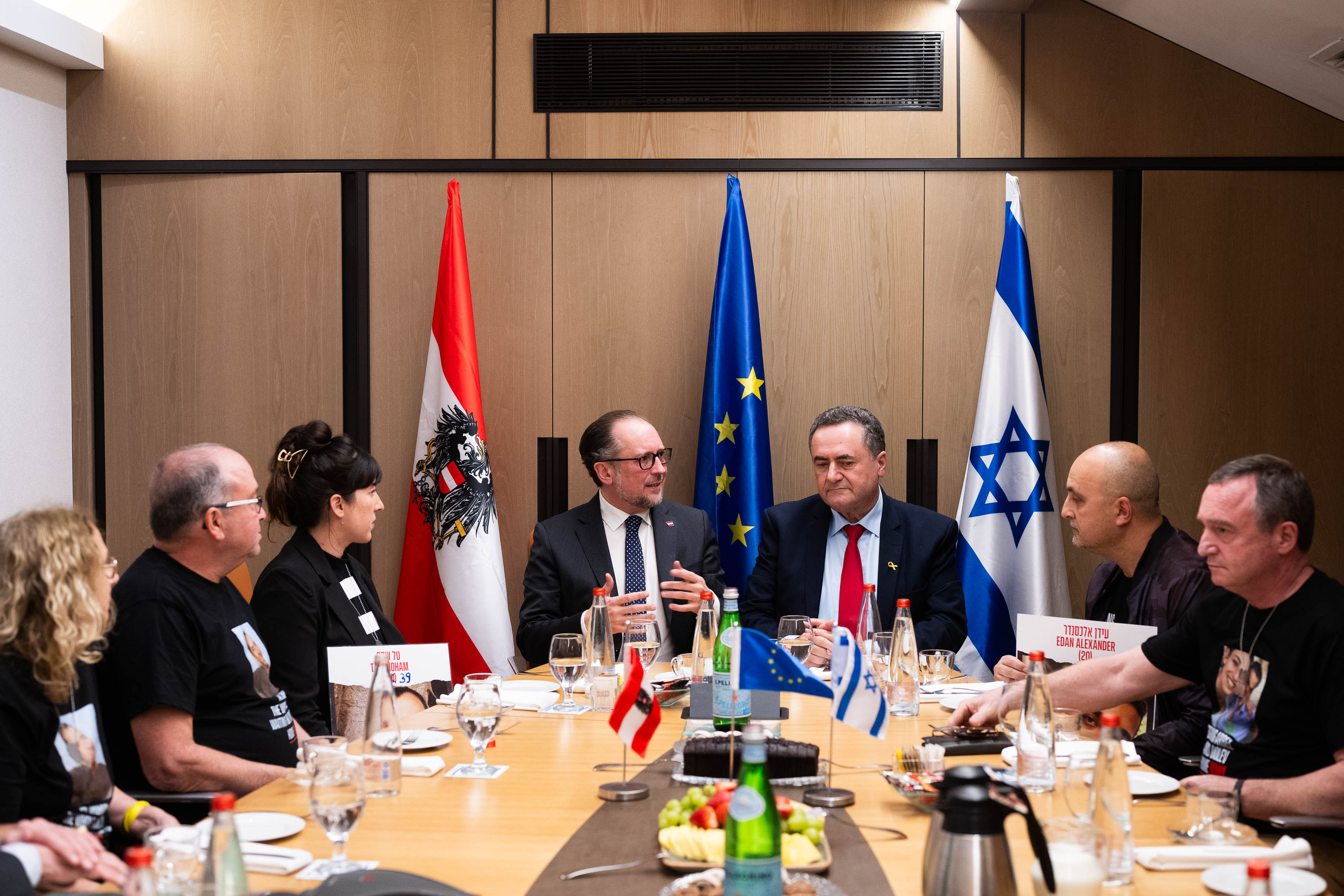
Katz with Austrian Foreign Minister Alexander Schallenberg in February 2024

On 5 November 2024, it was announced he would be nominated to the role of Defense Minister by Netanyahu, replacing Yoav Gallant, who was fired.

In a September 2026 speech, he called for the forceful removal of Palestinians from the Gaza Strip, stating "There is no real solution for Gaza in the end without this migration" and that the Israeli government "is organised and prepared to get them out – by sea, by air, by every way possible."

In an interview with Channel 14 on 17 October 2026, Katz called the destruction of 70–80% of Gaza a "dramatic achievement" and said Israel had "achieved its objectives" in the Gaza Strip. He went on to say that the same "Gaza model" was being applied in southern Lebanon, where, according to him, more than 60 villages, 23,000 homes, and an area of 700 square kilometers had been destroyed, leaving 200,000 residents displaced.

=== Terrorism and deterrence ===
In the aftermath of the 2016 Brussels bombings, Katz caused some controversy when he made "harsh" comments on Israel Radio about the inability of Belgium and the Western world to fight Islamic terrorism effectively. The Jerusalem Post quoted Katz as saying that, "The first rule of war is know your enemy, and Europe and the current American government are unwilling to define this war as against Islamist terrorism. If in Belgium they continue eating chocolate and enjoying life, and continue to appear as great democrats and liberals, they won't be aware that some Muslims in their country are organising terror, they won't be able to fight them." The "chocolate-eating Belgians" remark was widely quoted in the Western media and ridiculed on Twitter, and Katz was accused by Israeli pundits of giving Israel a bad image abroad as a result.

In March 2016, Katz introduced a bill to the Knesset to enable the Israeli government to deport the families of terrorists, if they are found to have been aware of, to have encouraged, or to have aided the act. The measure received broad support from the ruling coalition and key opposition MKs. The same month, Katz argued that Israel should employ "targeted civil eliminations" against leaders of Boycott, Divestment and Sanctions (BDS). The expression puns on the Hebrew word for targeted assassinations.

=== Dispute with Poland ===
During an interview on Israeli TV, Katz quoted Yitzhak Shamir by saying that Poles "suckled anti-Semitism from their mothers' breasts," allegedly causing Polish Prime Minister Mateusz Morawiecki to cancel his visit to Israel in February 2019. Morawiecki said the remarks were unacceptable and racist. Katz also stated that the Poles "collaborated with the Nazis" during World War II.

=== Dispute with Turkey ===
In August 2014, after Turkey's Prime Minister Recep Tayyip Erdoğan accused Israel of attempting a "systematic genocide" of Palestinian Arabs in Gaza, on account of Israel's Operation Protective Edge military campaign, Katz publicly reminded Erdoğan of the 1915 Armenian genocide, rejecting any accusations for defending Israel against those he termed Erdoğan's "friends in the Islamic movement".

In 2024, Ömer Çelik, the former Turkish Minister of European Union Affairs and spokesperson of the Justice and Development Party, likened Katz to Nazi leader Adolf Hitler's top diplomat Joachim von Ribbentrop due to his provocative remarks during the invasion of the Gaza Strip and Gaza genocide.

=== Dispute with France ===
In May 2025, Katz rebuked French president Emmanuel Macron's call to recognize a Palestinian state with certain conditions, saying, "They will recognize a Palestinian state on paper—and we will build the Jewish-Israeli state on the ground. The paper will be thrown in the trash can of history and the State of Israel will flourish and prosper."

=== Resignation of Yifat Tomer-Yerushalmi ===
Reportedly, a statement from Katz on the resignation of Yifat Tomer-Yerushalmi said "anyone who spreads blood libels against IDF troops is unfit to wear the army's uniform".

== See also ==
- List of Likud Knesset members
