= David Mena (politician) =

Israeli lawyer and politician (1953–2026)

- דוד מנע
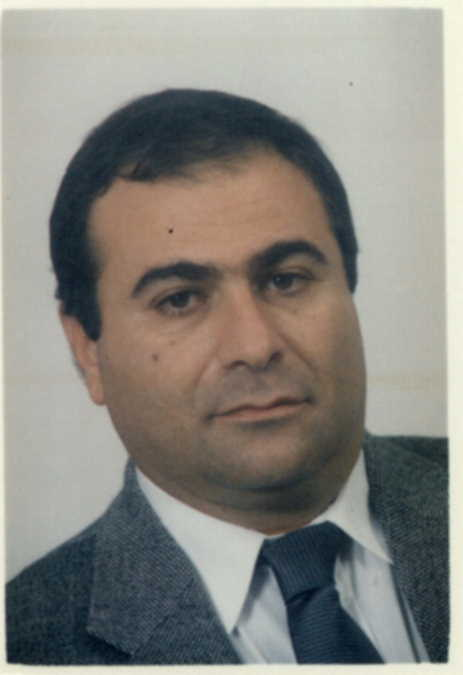

Faction represented in the Knesset
- 1992–1996: Likud
- 2006: Likud

Personal details
- Born: 8 April 1953 Or Yehuda, Israel
- Died: 18 April 2026 (aged 73) Ramat Gan, Israel

David Mena (Hebrew: דוד מנע; 8 April 1953 – 18 April 2026) was an Israeli lawyer and politician who was a member of the Knesset from 1992 to 1996 and in 2006.

== Life and career ==
Mena was born in Or Yehuda, Israel in 1953, to parents who immigrated from Iraq. He served in the Israel Defense Forces and later studied law at Tel Aviv University and was certified as a lawyer. He was also a graduate of criminology and international relations studies at Bar-Ilan University and of social services' management at Brandeis University.

Between the years 1978 and 1987, Mena was a member of Ramat Gan local council. He was also a member of the Israel Broadcasting Authority's plenum from 1984 until 1988. In 1988 Israeli legislative election, he was placed 49th on the Likud list, but did not get elected since Likud only won 40 seats. In 1992 he was elected to the thirteenth Knesset on behalf of the Likud party, serving on the House Committee, Labor and Welfare Committee, and the Committee on Drug Abuse. Mena was also the chairperson of the parliamentary inquiry committee regarding the Bedouin sector in Israel. He lost his seat in the 1996 elections, and returned to his law practice.

For the 2003 elections he was placed 43rd on the Likud list. Although the party won 38 seats, he re-entered the Knesset on 5 January 2006 as a replacement for Omri Sharon. He lost his seat again in the 2006 elections.

Mena resided in Ramat Gan. He died on 18 April 2026, at the age of 73.
