= Fateen Mulla =

Israeli Druze politician (born 1960)

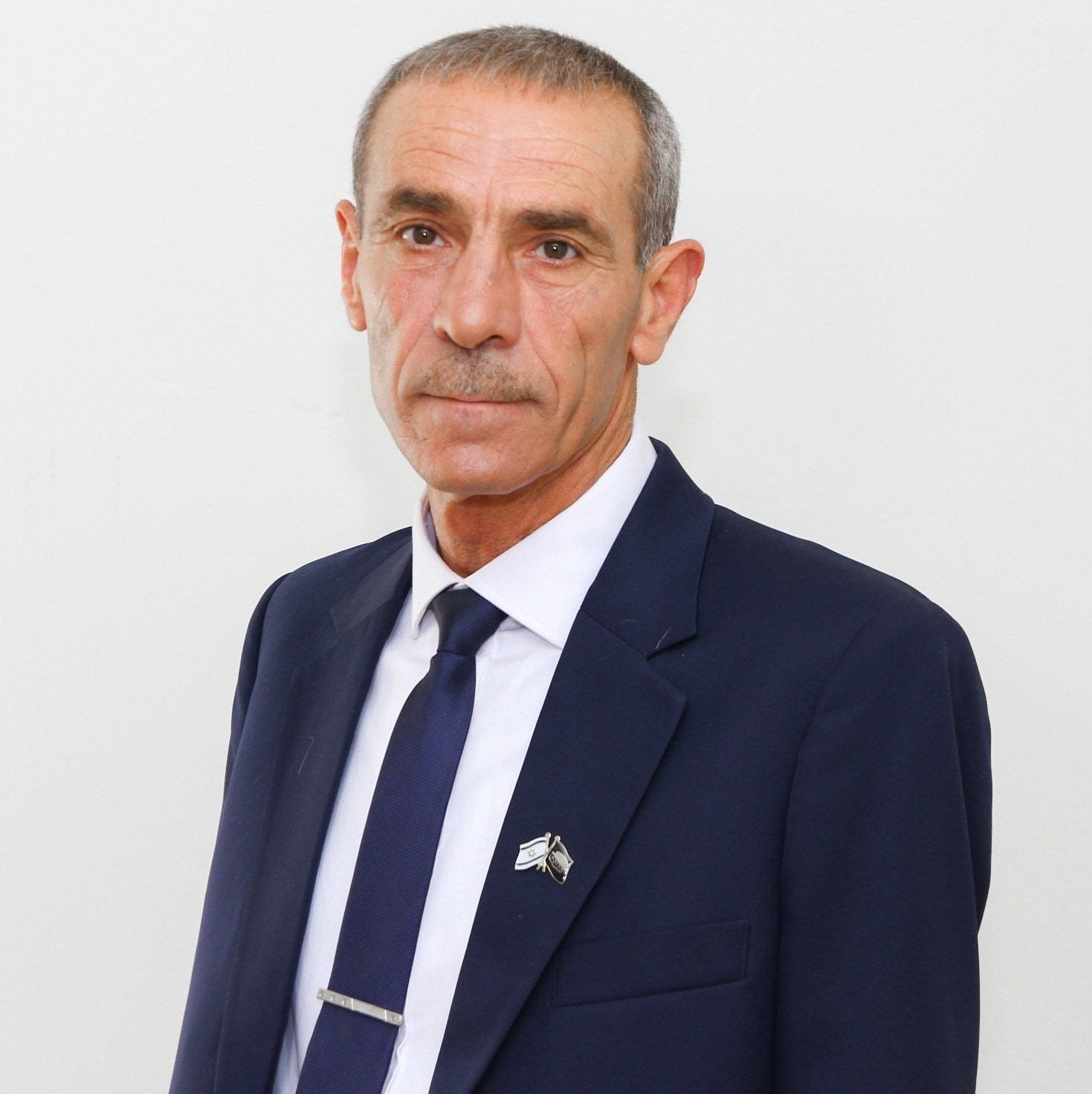
- Mulla in 2019

Faction represented in the Knesset
- 2019: Likud
- 2020–2022: Likud

Personal details
- Born: 15 June 1960 (age 65); Yarka, Israel

Fateen Mulla (Arabic: فطين ملا, Hebrew: פַטִין מוּלָא; born 15 June 1960) is an Israeli Druze politician. He served as a member of the Knesset for Likud in two spells between 2019 and 2022 and served as Deputy Minister in the Prime Minister's Office.

== Biography ==
Mulla was born in Yarka and attended school in the village. During his national service in the Israel Defense Forces, he served in the Sword Battalion, receiving an injury that led to him being recognised as a disabled veteran. He remained in the army following the completion of his national service, eventually becoming a lieutenant colonel in the Northern Command.

In the early 1980s he studied at the University of Haifa, gaining a bachelor's degree in general studies. In 1983 he joined the Arab Israel Bank, working as a teller. In 1987 he joined Bituah Leumi, running its collection systems in Maghar and Tiberias. In 1996 he was promoted, becoming director of the Yarka branch, a position he held until 2019. Between 2009 and 2011 he studied for a bachelor's degree in business administration and general management at the College of Management Academic Studies.

Mulla ran for the minority place on the Likud list for the 2015 Knesset elections, but lost to Ayoob Kara. Prior to the April 2019 elections, he was given the thirty-first place on the Likud list, a slot reserved for non-Jewish members. He was subsequently elected to the Knesset as the party won 35 seats. However, he lost his seat in the early elections in September the same year as Likud were reduced to 31 seats. He returned to the Knesset following the March 2020 elections and was appointed Deputy Minister in the Prime Minister's Office in May. He was re-elected in the 2021 elections, but lost his seat in the 2022 elections after being placed sixty-fifth on the Likud list.

Mulla is married to Raida and lives in Yarka; the couple have a daughter named Jumana.
