= Ariel Weinstein =

Israeli journalist and politician

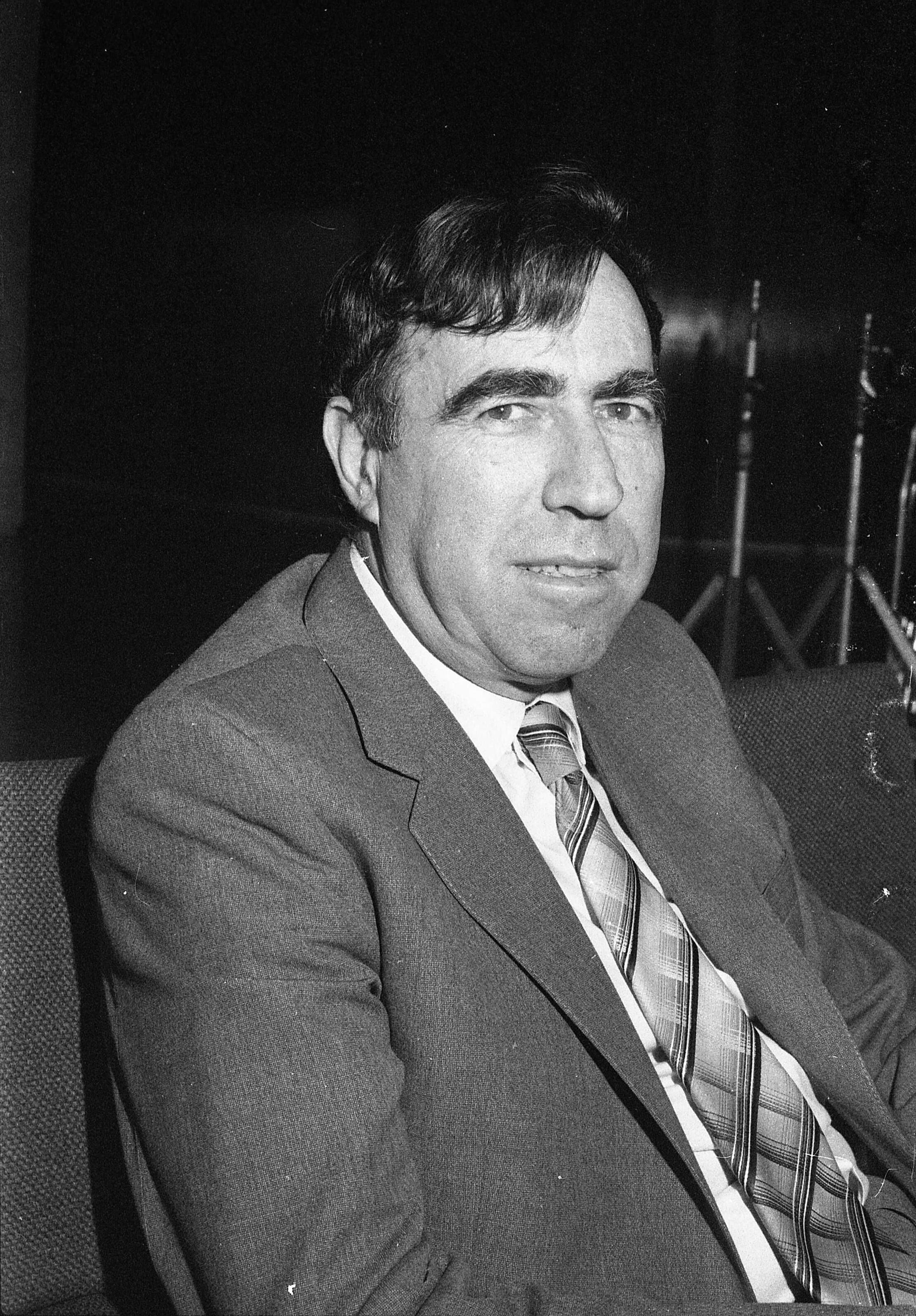
- Weinstein in 1983

Faction represented in the Knesset
- 1982–1992: Likud
- 1993–1996: Likud

Personal details
- Born: 2 May 1932 Jerusalem, Mandatory Palestine
- Died: 10 March 1996 (aged 63)

Ariel Weinstein (Hebrew: אריאל וינשטיין; 2 May 1932 – 10 March 1996) was an Israeli journalist and politician who served as a member of the Knesset for Likud during the 1980s and 1990s.

== Biography ==
Weinstein was born in Jerusalem during the Mandate era. He joined the Haganah, and after Israeli independence, served in the IDF from 1950 until 1954, being demobilised with the rank of Lieutenant-Colonel.

He went to university, and later worked as an economic reporter for Ma'ariv and HaBoker, as well as editing economic journals. He served as chairman of the Finance Committee of the World Zionist Organization and was deputy chairman of the Israel Broadcasting Authority. In addition, he was a certified land appraiser, and chaired the Council of Land Appraisers.

He was on the Likud list for the 1981 elections, but failed to win a seat. However, he entered the Knesset on 18 October 1982 as a replacement for the deceased David Shiffman. He was re-elected in 1984 and 1988, but lost his seat in the 1992 elections. He returned to the Knesset on 30 December 1993 as a replacement for Roni Milo, but died in office on 10 March 1996. His seat was taken by Michael Ratzon.
