= Dov Shilansky =

Israeli politician (1924–2010)

- דב שילנסקי
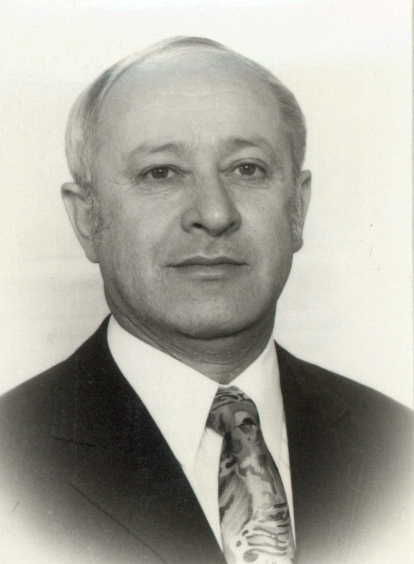

Speaker of the Knesset
- In office 21 November 1988 – 13 July 1992
- Preceded by: Shlomo Hillel
- Succeeded by: Shevah Weiss

Faction represented in the Knesset
- 1977–1996: Likud

Personal details
- Born: Berelis Šilianskis; 21 March 1924 Šiauliai, Lithuania
- Died: 9 December 2010 (aged 86) Tel Aviv, Israel

Dov Shilansky (Hebrew: דב שילנסקי; 21 March 1924 – 9 December 2010) was an Israeli lawyer, politician and Speaker of the Knesset from 1988 to 1992.

== Biography ==
Dov Shilansky (born Berelis Šilianskis) was born in Šiauliai, Lithuania. He survived The Holocaust along with his three siblings and mother, and joined the Irgun, operating as the leader of the organisation's branch in southern Italy. He made aliyah in 1948, arriving in Israel on the Altalena, and served as a combat officer in the 1948 Arab–Israeli War. He continued to serve as a reservist, fighting in the Six-Day and Yom Kippur Wars. Between 1970 and 1974, he was an executive officer in "Haga" (Civil Defense) in Gush Dan, and until 1989 was an educational officer.

In October 1952, Shilansky was arrested while attempting to bring a suitcase bomb into the Israeli Foreign Ministry. Accused of being a member of an unnamed underground organization opposed to Israeli-German reparations negotiations, he was sentenced to two years in prison.

He gained an LL.B from the Hebrew University of Jerusalem and worked as an attorney as well as becoming a member of the Ethics Committee of the Israel Bar Association and the International Organization of Jewish Law Professionals.

Shilansky died in Tel Aviv on 9 December 2010, at the age of 86.

== Political career ==
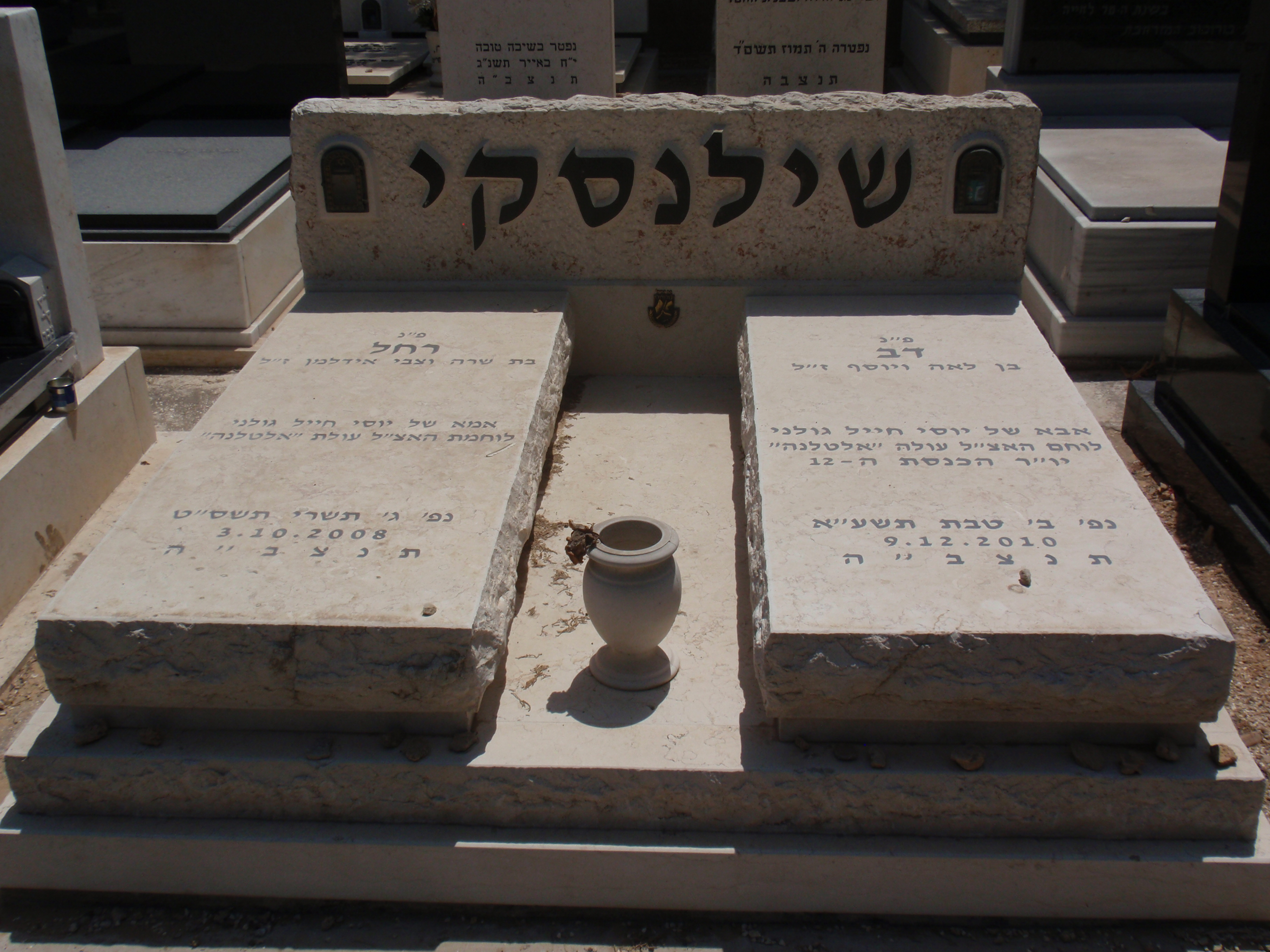
Grave of Dov Shilansky

In 1977 he was elected to the Knesset as a member of Likud, and was appointed the Knesset representative on the Committee for the Appointment of Judges. He was re-elected in 1981 and was made Deputy Minister in the Ministry in the Prime Minister's Office.

After retaining his seat again in 1984 and then in 1988, he was appointed Speaker of the Knesset. After the 1992 elections he served as Deputy Speaker. In 1993 he was a candidate for President, but was defeated by Ezer Weizman by 66 to 53. He lost his seat in the 1996 elections, but was usually included in the ceremonial 120th slot in Likud's election lists.
