= David Shiffman =

Israeli politician (1923–1982)

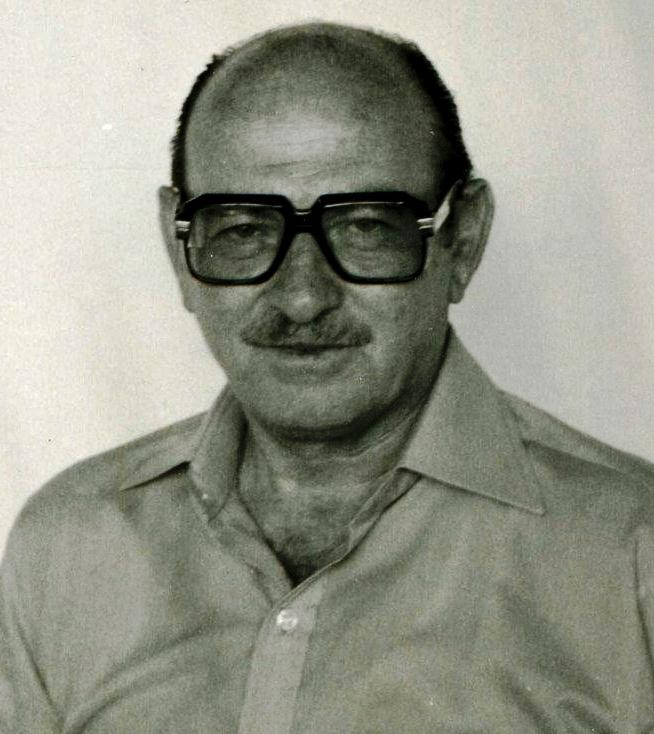
- Shiffman during his time in the Knesset

Faction represented in the Knesset
- 1981–1982: Likud

Personal details
- Born: 14 April 1923; Warsaw, Poland
- Died: 18 October 1982 (aged 59)

David Shiffman (Hebrew: דוד שיפמן; 14 April 1923 – 18 October 1982) was an Israeli politician who served as Deputy Minister of Transport and as a member of the Knesset between 1981 and his death in 1982.

== Biography ==
Born in Warsaw in Poland, Shiffman emigrated to Mandatory Palestine the following year. He was educated in a yeshiva, and went on to attend the Jerusalem Teachers Seminary. He was a member of the Bnei Akiva youth movement, and later established the Bnei Akiva yeshiva in Kfar Haroeh. During his national service in the IDF he served in the Military Police Corps, and reached the rank of major by the time he was demobilised. Between 1952 and 1974 he served as general secretary of the Israel Merchants Association. From 1968 until 1974 he managed a hotel supply company. He later became chairman of the board of directors at the Israel Electric Corporation and the Ayalon Highways company.

A member of the central committee of the Liberal Party, in 1964 Shiffman was elected to Tel Aviv city council. In 1974 he became a deputy mayor, with responsibility for the Youth Department and Engineering Authority. In 1981 he was elected to the Knesset on the Likud list (then an alliance of the Liberal Party, Herut and other-right wing factions). He was appointed Deputy Minister of Transportation in the Begin government, but died whilst in office on 18 October the following year. His seat was taken by Ariel Weinstein.
