= Jackie Levy =

Israeli politician (born 1960)

- ז'קי לוי
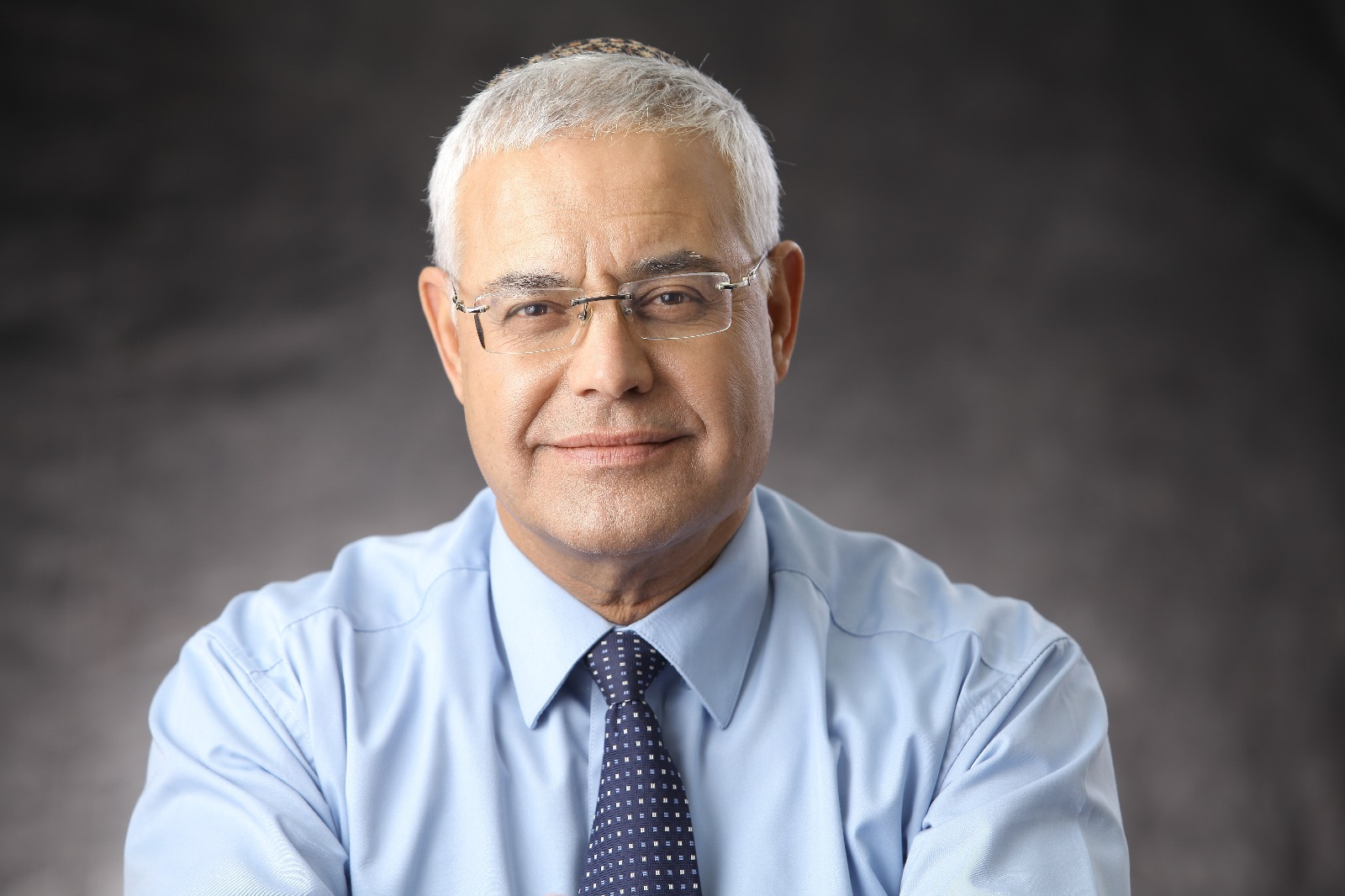
- Levy in 2018

Faction represented in the Knesset
- 2015–2018: Likud

Mayor of Beit She'an
- In office 2002–2013
- Succeeded by: Rafi Ben Shitrit
- In office 2018–2024
- Preceded by: Rafi Ben Shitrit
- Succeeded by: No'am Joma'a

Personal details
- Born: 28 October 1960 (age 66) Beit She'an, Israel

Jackie Levy (Hebrew: ז'קי לוי; born 28 October 1960) is an Israeli politician. He served as mayor of Beit She'an and as a member of the Knesset for Likud, and as Deputy Minister of Construction.

== Biography ==
Levy was born in Beit She'an, the second child of Likud politician David Levy. After doing his IDF national service in the paratroopers he became assistant to the mayor of Ramat Yishai. In 1989 he was elected to Beit She'an City Council as part of the Lev faction, and served as Deputy Mayor between 1992 and 1998. In 2002 he was injured in a terrorist attack on the city's branch of the Likud party. In the same year, he became the city's mayor, serving until 2013.

Prior to the 2015 Knesset elections he was placed 18th on the Likud list. However, in March 2015, he was charged with environmental violations during his time as mayor. He was elected to the Knesset as Likud won 30 seats, and was appointed Deputy Minister of Construction on 14 June.

In the October 2018 municipal elections Levy was elected Mayor of Beit She'an. He subsequently left the Knesset and his deputy ministerial post on 18 November; his Knesset seat was taken by Osnat Mark.

Levy Lost a bid for reelection in 2024 Israeli municipal elections.

Levy has seven children, and his sister Orly Levy is also a politician.
