= Omri Sharon =

Israeli politician, son of Ariel Sharon

- עמרי שרון
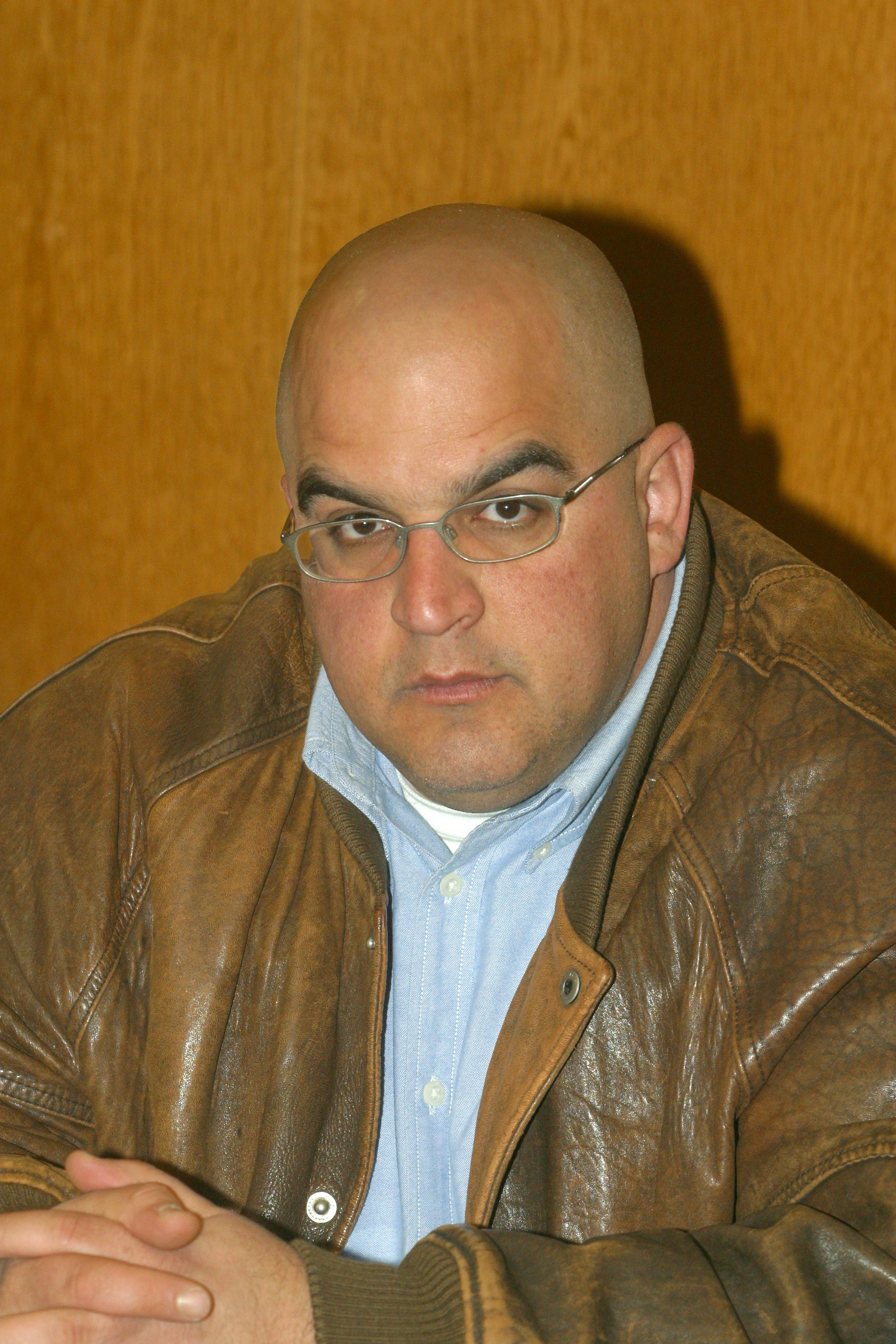

Faction represented in the Knesset
- 2003–2006: Likud
- 2005–2006: Kadima

Personal details
- Born: 19 August 1964 (age 61)

Omri Sharon (Hebrew: עמרי שרון; born 19 August 1964) is a former Israeli politician, son of former Israeli Prime Minister Ariel Sharon. He served as a member of Knesset between 2003 and 2006. In 2006, he served time in prison on corruption charges.

== Political career ==
Elected to the Knesset in 2003, Omri Sharon closely supported his father's positions on many issues, stepping out in his own direction on only one issue – the environment in Israel – in this arena it appeared that the father supported the son. Before long, Omri headed the Environmental Lobby within Knesset – his political term in this position is seen by some as a golden age for the environment in Israel's history. Thanks to powerful intervention from MK Omri and his father PM Ariel Sharon, environmentalists fought off real estate developers and won a battle to develop Mount Hiriya and the surrounding agricultural lands into a sprawling public park slated to be almost three times as large as Central Park in New York. Formerly known as "Park Ayalon", the park has been renamed after the former Prime Minister and is slated to be "Ariel Sharon Park".

== Controversy ==
In 2006, Sharon became involved in a scandal relating to fundraising for his father's 1999 Likud leadership campaign. On July 26, 2005, Israeli attorney general Menachem Mazuz announced that he would indict Omri on charges of corruption. Omri had parliamentary immunity at the time, but indicated willingness to stand trial. The Knesset passed a law limiting members' immunity in order to allow the indictment. Omri was formally indicted on August 28, charged with felonies of political corruption and with perjury.

On November 14, Sharon agreed to plead guilty in a plea bargain with prosecutors. He resigned from the Knesset on January 3, 2006, and his resignation became effective on January 5. On February 14, 2006, he was sentenced to nine months in prison, a nine-month suspended sentence, and a fine of 300,000 NIS. The start of his prison term was delayed by six months because of his father's health. A nine-month suspended sentence was handed down to Gavriel Manor, Sharon's associate in the affair.

On March 30, 2006, Sharon appealed to the Tel Aviv District Court. He argued that he had already been punished by resigning from the Knesset. He cited his mother's death as reason for greater leniency and expressed regret for his actions. His prison term was later reduced to seven months. He reported to Maasiyahu Prison to begin serving his sentence in 2008. He was paroled after serving five months and remained subject to parole restrictions for the remaining two months.

== See also ==
- List of Israeli public officials convicted of crimes or misdemeanors
