= Limor Livnat =

Israeli politician (born 1950)

- לימור לבנת
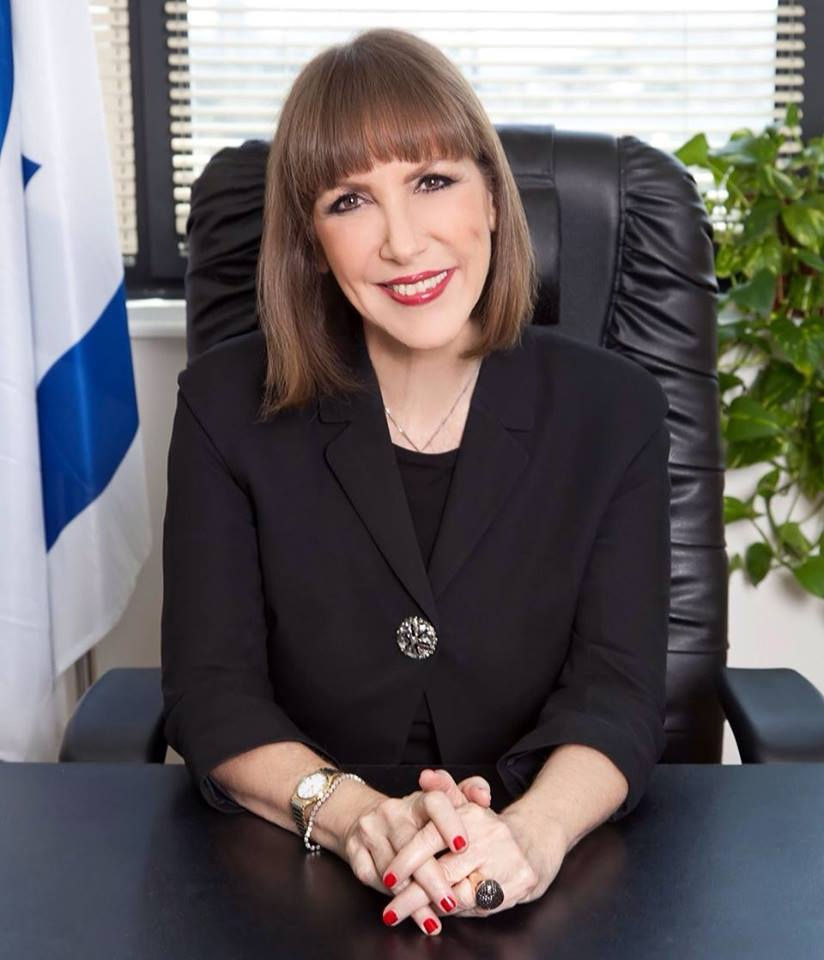
- Limor Livnat in 2014

Ministerial roles
- 1996–1999: Minister of Communications
- 2001–2006: Minister of Education
- 2009–2015: Minister of Culture & Sport

Faction represented in the Knesset
- 1992–2015: Likud

Personal details
- Born: 22 September 1950 (age 76) Haifa, Israel
- Party: Likud (1988–2021)
- Other political affiliations: Herut (1970–1988)
- Children: 2
- Education: Tel Aviv University

Limor Ahava Livnat (Hebrew: לימור אהבה לבנת;; born 22 September 1950) is an Israeli former politician. She served as a member of the Knesset for Likud between 1992 and 2015, and was Minister of Communications, Minister of Education, and Minister of Culture & Sport.

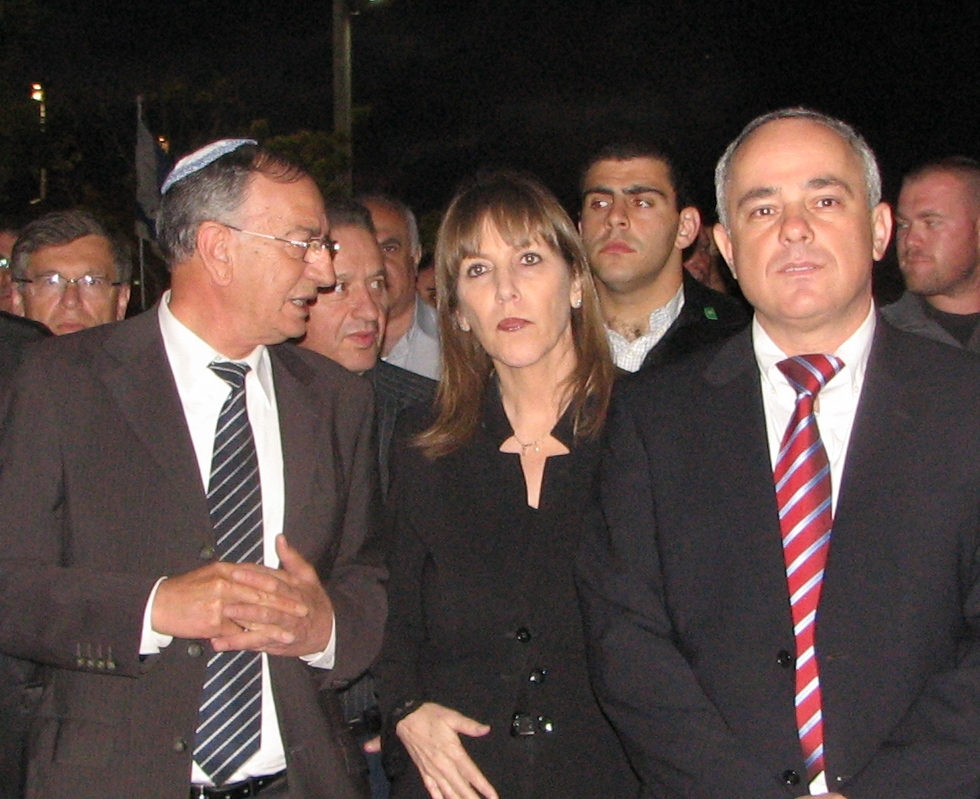
Limor Livnat at the opening ceremony of the country club in Nesher (2010) on her left David Amar, mayor of Nesher, and on the right Finance Minister Yuval Steinitz

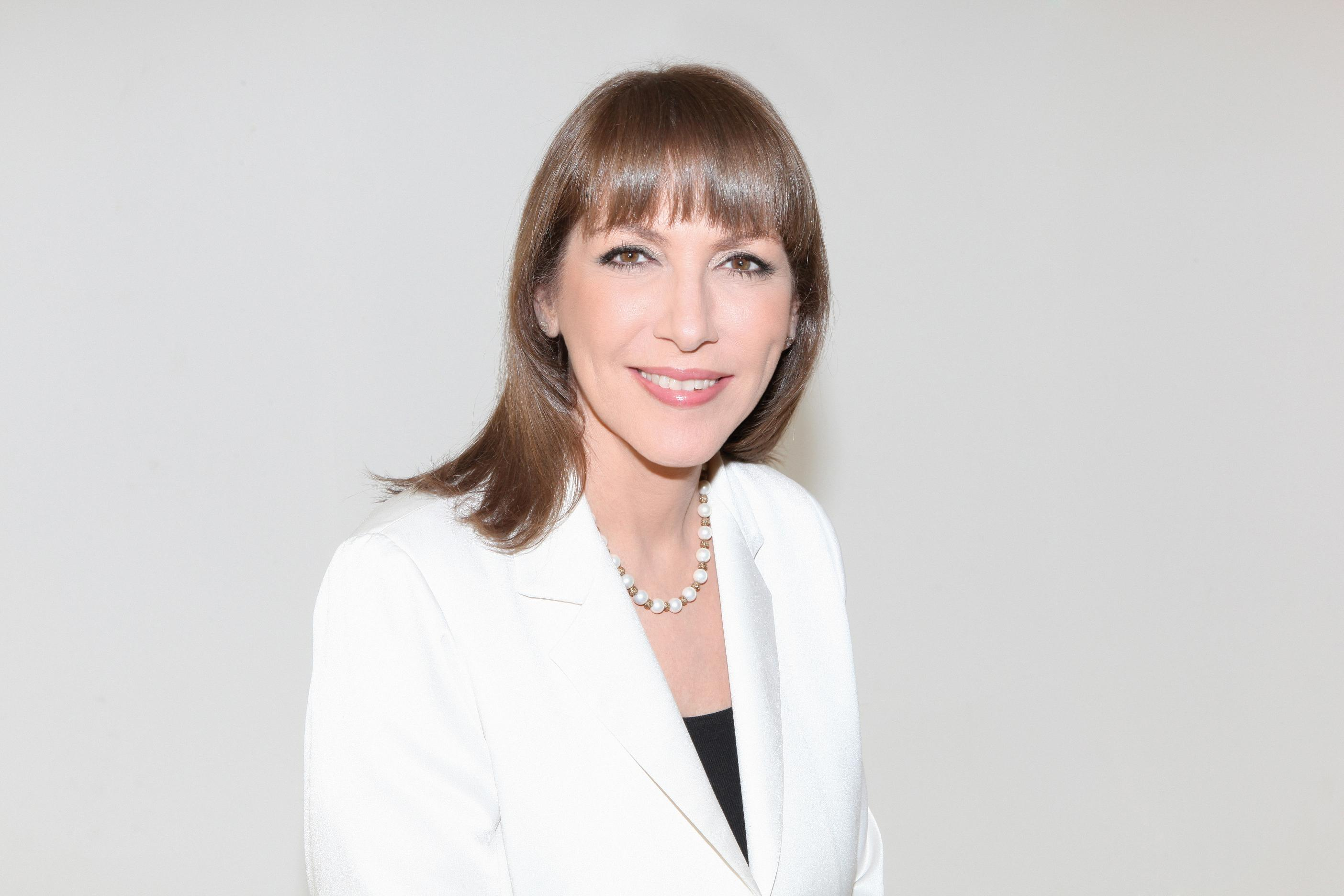
Limor Livnat during her tenure as Minister of Culture and Sports

== Biography ==
Born in Haifa, Livnat studied at Tel Aviv University. A supporter of Menachem Begin, she joined Herut in 1970, and became head of Likud's youth organisation in 1977. She first entered the Knesset on 14 April 1992, shortly before the 1992 elections, as a replacement for Haim Corfu. She retained her seat in the elections, and in her first full term, served as chairwoman of the Committee for the Advancement of the Status of Women, the Subcommittee on Laws of Personal Status and the Parliamentary Committee for Investigating Murder of Women by their Spouses.

She retained her seat in the 1996 elections, and was appointed Minister of Communications in Binyamin Netanyahu's government. During her term, she attempted to increase competition in the Israeli communications sector by weakening and privatizing Bezeq, which had previously held a monopoly over the country's landline phone sector.

Tensions between Livnat and Netanyahu climaxed in the former's resignation from government in 1997 and subsequent attempts to end Netanyahu's leadership of the Likud. Following Netanyahu's resignation from the Likud leadership after the party's defeat in the 1999 elections, Livnat supported Ariel Sharon's successful attempt to serve as the next chairperson of the party. After Sharon's victory over Ehud Barak in the special election for Prime Minister in 2001, Livnat was appointed Minister of Education in both governments he formed.

She was re-elected in 2003, and continued to serve as Minister of Education until Likud left the coalition (now headed by the newly formed Kadima) in 2006. She retained her seat in the 2006 and 2009 elections, after which she was appointed to the new Minister of Culture and Sport post. Prior to the 2013 elections she lost her place as the top-ranking woman in Likud, finishing below Tzipi Hotovely and Miri Regev in the party primaries. However, she was re-elected and continued in the ministerial role.

In December 2014 Livnat announced that she was leaving politics, and would not run in the March 2015 elections.

Livnat has also served as Vice Chairwoman and Acting Chairwoman of the World Likud Movement.

In February 2021, Livnat announced that she was leaving Likud after 51 years of membership in protest of Benjamin Netanyahu signing a surplus agreement with the far-right Religious Zionist Party. She later expressed support for Gideon Sa'ar and his party New Hope.

== Personal views and life ==
Although overtly secular, Livnat is generally identified as a right-wing conservative, both morally and politically. A supporter of Revisionist Zionism, she ideologically opposed the Oslo Accords as well as the notion of relinquishing control over the West Bank. In this light she has voiced concerns over US President George W. Bush's Road Map for Peace. She also regularly attends events in honor of the pre-independence militant organizations, such as the Irgun and Lehi. However, she did not actively oppose Ariel Sharon's disengagement plan.

In April 2011, Livnat's nephew, Ben-Joseph Livnat, 25, was shot dead by a Palestinian Authority policeman when trying to break through a Palestinian road block after an unauthorized visit to Joseph's Tomb in a Palestinian-administered area of Nablus. Livnat described the shooting death of her nephew as an act of terrorism. An IDF report released a month later concluded that the event was not a premeditated terror attack, but that the policeman had acted "maliciously" and with the intent to harm.

In an interview with Army Radio on 25 December 2011, Livnat, who was then leading the Interministerial Committee on the Status of Women, opined that segregation on public transport should be permitted in entirely ultra-orthodox areas of the country. "I don't think we should tell them how to live," said Livnat, "We should live and let live...When we are speaking about a mixed city, however, or a city where haredim or religious people oppose segregation, we must fight the phenomenon of public segregation between sexes," she added.

A resident of Tel Aviv, Livnat is married and has two children.

== Books ==
In June 2024, her autobiographical book, Your husband allows you? - Limor Livnat without fear was published by Yediot Books.
