= Osnat Mark =

Israeli lawyer and politician

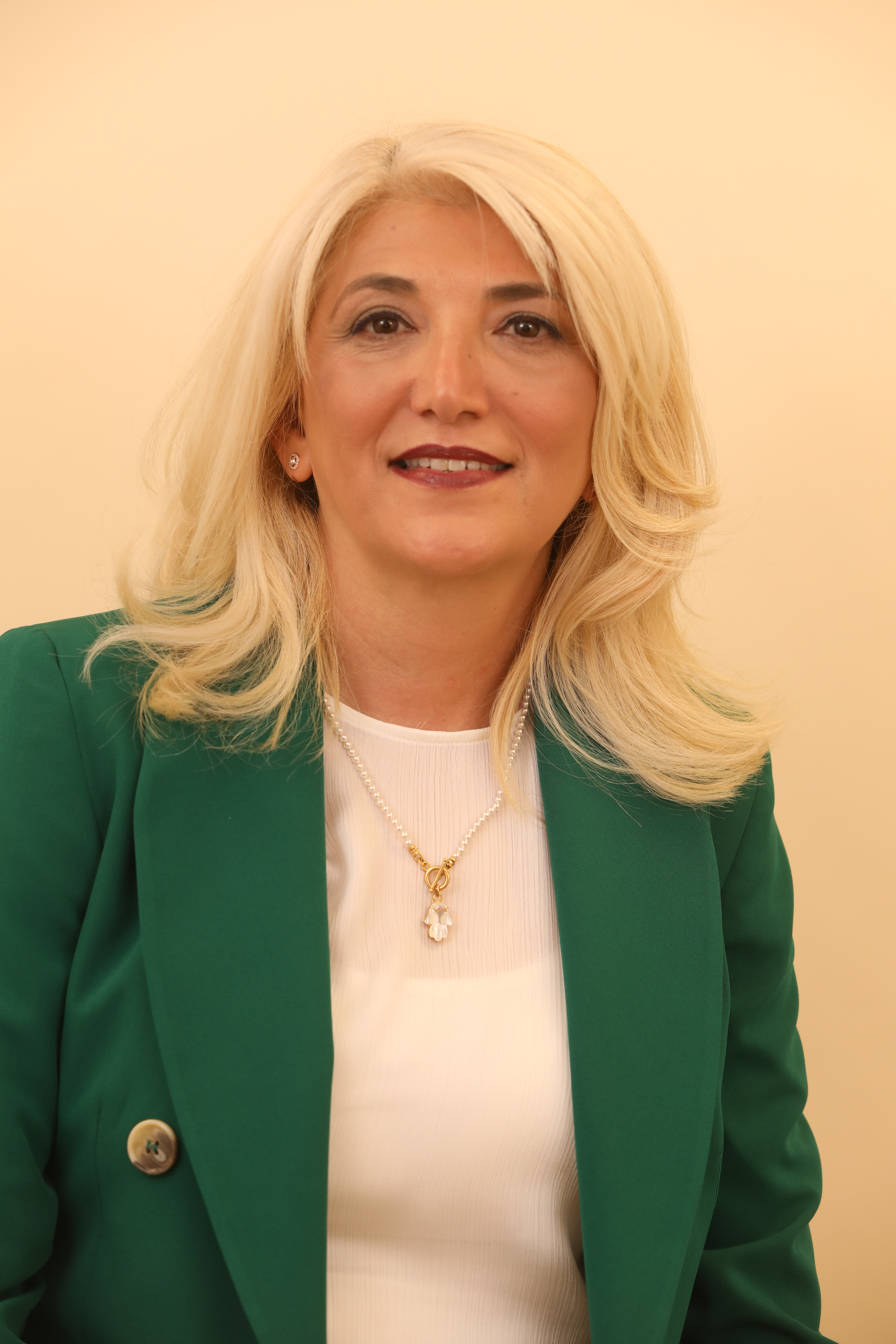
- Mark in 2019

Faction represented in the Knesset
- 2018–2019: Likud
- 2020–2021: Likud

Personal details
- Born: 22 September 1967 (age 58) Ofakim, Israel

Osnat Hila Mark (Hebrew: אוסנת הילה מארק; born 22 September 1967) is an Israeli lawyer and politician. She served as a member of the Knesset for Likud in two spells between 2018 and 2021.

== Biography ==
Mark was born and grew up in Ofakim. She became a lawyer, specialising in civil law.

A member of Likud, she was placed 57th on the party's list for the 2006 elections and 40th for the 2009 elections, but on each occasion failed to win a seat. She won 34th place on the party's list for the 2015 elections, and although Likud won only 30 seats, Osnat became a Knesset member in 2018 as a replacement for Jackie Levy, who left the legislature after being elected mayor of Beit She'an in the 2018 municipal elections. She was placed 35th on the party's list for the April 2019 elections, and was re-elected as Likud won 35 seats. However, she lost her seat in the September 2019 elections, which saw Likud reduced to 31 seats. She failed to regain her seat in the March 2020 elections, but re-entered the Knesset on 5 July 2020 as a replacement for Gilad Erdan after he was appointed as the Permanent Representative of Israel to the United Nations and Israeli ambassador to the United States. Placed thirty-fourth on the Likud list for the March 2021 elections, she lost her seat as Likud was reduced to 30 seats.

Mark is married with three children and lives in the Israeli settlement of Ma'ale Adumim.
