= 1969 Israeli municipal elections =

Local elections in several municipalities and councils in Israel

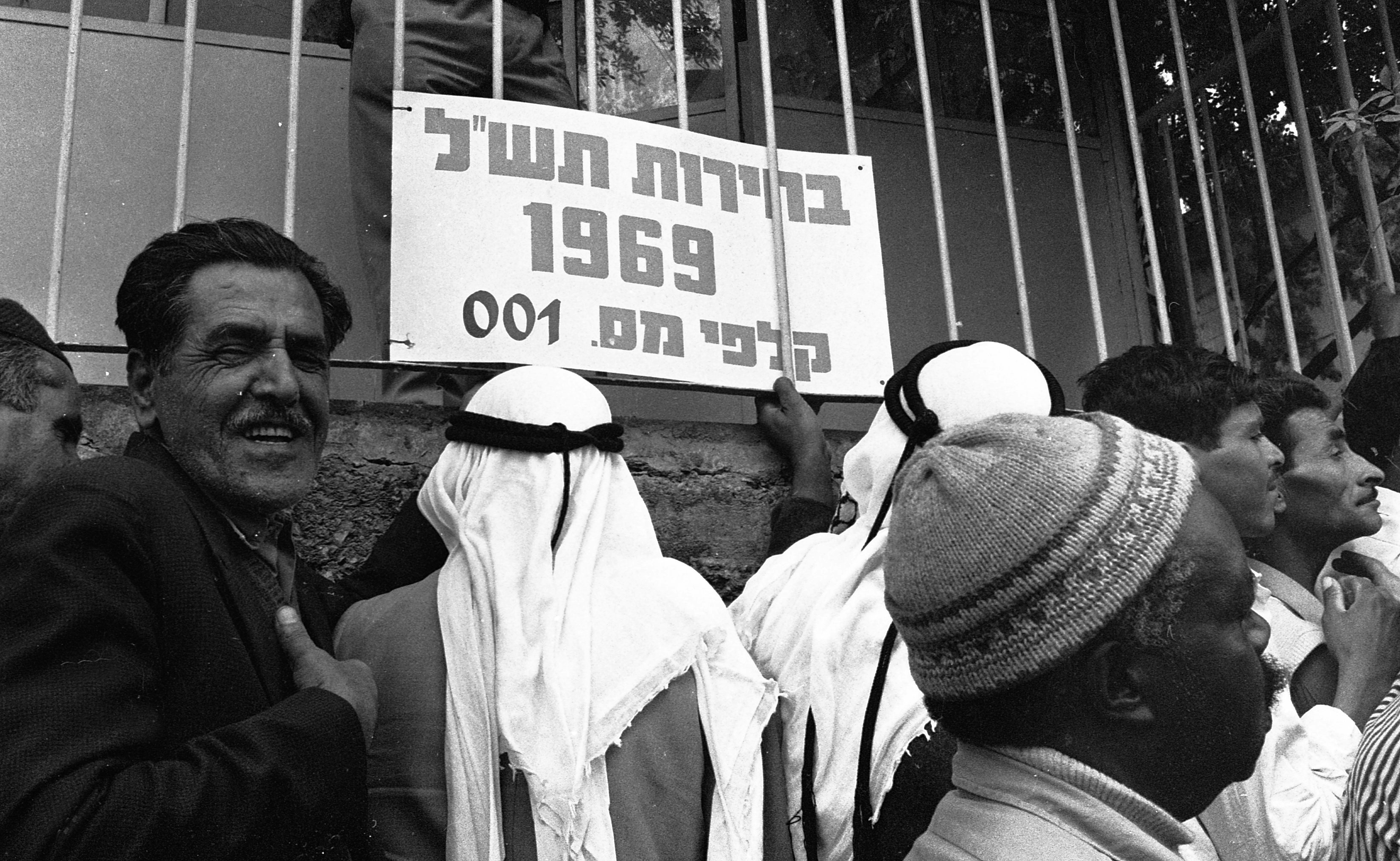

Municipal Elections took place in Israel on 28 October 1969, alongside a legislative election. They were the first to take place after the Six-Day War.

== Elections by Municipality ==
=== In Cities ===
In the newly unified Jerusalem, the Alignment, led by Incumbent Mayor Teddy Kollek, won 16 seats on the City Council, an absolute majority. Gahal won 6 seats, Agudat Yisrael won 4, Mafdal won 3, while Poalei Agudat Yisrael and the 'Olehs from Babylon' list won one seat each.

In Tel Aviv, the Alignment, led by Acting Mayor Yehoshua Rabinovich, won 13 seats, Gahal won 12, Mafdal won 3, while Agudat Yisrael, the Mamlachti list and the Independent Liberal party won one seat each.

In Haifa, incumbent Alignment mayor Moshe Flimann, who replaced Abba Hushi as mayor following the latter's death six months prior, was re-elected, with the Alignment winning 14 seats, Gahal winning 6, the Independent Liberal Party winning 2 and Mafdal winning one.

In Beersheba, the Alignment, led by Eliyahu Nawi, won 9 out of 17 seats on the City Council.

The Alignment also formed local governments in Lod (with incumbent mayor Zvi Itzkovich being re-elected), Nahariya, Bat Yam, Kfar Saba, Holon, Herzliya, Givatayim and Eilat.

In Bnei Brak, Mafdal candidate Israel Gotlib formed a coalition with the Alignment and Gahal. Mafdal also formed a coalition in Dimona, where they were led by Israel Navon.

In Ashdod, Gahal candidate Zvi Zilker unseated incumbent Alignment mayor Avner Garin. The Alignment was also defeated in Rehovot, where Shmuel Rechtman's election as mayor ended 23 years of Alignment governance. Gahal also retained control of municipal governments in Ashkelon, Hadera, Netanya, and Safed.

In Ramat Gan, incumbent mayor Avraham Krinitzi, who had served as mayor for 43 years, was re-elected as a candidate for Gahal. He died in a car accident two weeks after the election was held, which led to Yisrael Peled succeeding him as Mayor.

=== In Regional Councils ===
In Metula, the Alignment unseated a local list first elected in 1965.

In Ofakim, Alignment candidate Yehiel Bentov was elected as head of the Local Council.

The Alignment retained control of local councils in Afula, Migdal, Yarka, Yehud, Kfar Yona, Kiryat Motzkin, Hod HaSharon, Or Yehuda, Even Yehuda, Migdal HaEmek, Kiryat Gat and Ramat Yishai. In Tel Mond, Alignment candidate Naftali Din was elected to lead the local council, but resigned the following year and was replaced by Dov Abels, who was not a member of the Alignment.

In Be'er Ya'akov, Gahal candidate Avraham Lichtenstein was elected Mayor. In Tirat Carmel, a coalition of Right Wing and Religious parties formed a local government, with the Alignment leading the municipal opposition. Gahal also formed a government in Menahemia.

In Ramat HaSharon, Gahal formed a coalition with a local party called 'the Public List', unseating the Incumbent Alignment government.

In Yeruham, Mafdal formed a government with a local list, in which the two lists rotated the leadership of the local council.

Mafdal formed local governments in Netivot, Mevaseret Zion, Beit She'an, Gan Yavne, and Ganei Tikva.

Local lists formed governments in Kfar Shmaryahu, Giv'at Shmuel, and Neve Efraim.

In Yesud HaMa'ala, Shavei Tzion, Kfar Tavor and Ramot HaShavim one electoral list ran unopposed and won all seats in the Local Council.
