= 1983 Israeli municipal elections =

Local elections in several municipalities and councils in Israel

Municipal elections took place in Israel on 25 October 1983.

== Elections by municipality ==
Four candidates ran for Mayor in Jerusalem. Incumbent Mayor Teddy Kollek, as well as Meir Porush, Shlomo Tusia Cohen and Gershon Solomon. Kollek was re-elected with around 80,000 votes. In the City Council, Kollek's list, One Jerusalem, won 17 seats, the Likud won 4, Agudat Yisrael and the newly founded Shas won 3 seats each, Poalei Agudat Yisrael won 2, while Tadir and Mafdal won one seat each.

Seven candidates ran for Mayor in Tel Aviv, including Alignment candidate Dov Ben-Meir, Vicki Shiran, Yitzhak Artzi, Abie Nathan, Mordechai Virshubski and incumbent Mayor Shlomo Lahat. Lahat was re-elected with 58.4% of the vote. In the City Council, the Likud won 14 seats, the Alignment won 9, the Religious List won 3, the Liberal Party and Shinui won 2 seats each, and Abie Nathan's list won one. Hadash failed to cross the City Council's electoral threshold.

In Haifa, incumbent Alignment Mayor Aryeh Gur'el was re-elected with 63% of the vote. He defeated several candidates, including Scientist and Shinui candidate Yehudit Naot who won 6.6% of the vote, and pilot Yael Rom, who on 17% of the vote. In the City Council, the Alignment won 14 seats, the Likud won 5, the United Religious Front won 3, Shinui and 'Haifa the Right Way' won 2 seats each, while Hadash, the Youth List and the Liberal List won one seat each.

In Beersheba, incumbent Mayor Eliyahu Nawi was re-elected, defeating Labor candidate Uri Sabag in the second round.

In Rishon LeZion, Alignment candidate Meir Nitzan defeated incumbent Mayor Hananya Gibstein, winning 52% of the vote to Gibstein's 33%. In the City Council, the Alignment won 11 seats, Gibstein's list won 5, the Likud and the Religious List won 2 seats each, and a local list won one seat.

In Ramat Gan, Likud candidate Yisrael Peled won a plurality of votes in the first round, but won 1.2% (600 votes) less than the 40% of the vote necessary to avoid a runoff. Peled was defeated in the second round by Alignment candidate Uri Amit, who won 50.5% to Peled's 49.5%.

In Herzliya, Likud candidate Eli Landau defeated incumbent Labor Mayor Yosef Navo, winning 55% of the vote to Landau's 41.7%. In the City Council, Labor won 8 seats, the Likud won 7, and Mafdal and Agudat Yisrael won one seat each.

In Kfar Saba, Alignment candidate Yitzhak Vald was re-elected with 74.6% of the vote, with his party winning 10 out of 15 seats on the City Council.

In Migdal HaEmek, Likud candidate Shaul Amor defeated Alignment Candidate Ya'akov Toledano and Independent David Kadosh, winning 54.5% of the vote.

In Kiryat Gat and Kiryat Shmona, Likud candidates David Magen and Prosper Azaran respectively were elected Mayor.

In Bat Yam, Alignment Candidate Ohad Kinnamon was elected mayor, winning 44% of the vote. his party won 12 out of 23 seats on the City Council.

In Nazareth-Illit, incumbent Alignment mayor Menachem Ariev was re-elected. In the City Council, the Alignment won 8 seats while the Likud won 5.

In Bnei Brak, Moshe Irenstein was elected with around 55% of the vote.

In Givatayim, Alignment candidate Yitzhak Yaron was elected Mayor.

In Hadera, incumbent Mayor Yehiel Kahana was re-elected with 44.3% of the vote. In Holon, incumbent Alignment Mayor Pinhas Eylon was re-elected.

In Afula, incumbent Likud Mayor Ovadia Eli was re-elected unopposed.

Alignment candidates won Mayoral and Local Council elections in Givat Ada, Ness Ziona, Nahalat Yehuda (which later became a neighbourhood of Rishon LeZion), and Mitzpe Ramon.

Likud candidates won Mayoral and Local Council elections in Metula, Netivot, Menahemia and Kiryat Ekron.

Mafdal candidate Tzadok Ben-Yitzhak was elected Head of the Local Council in Mevaseret Zion, while incumbent Tiberias Mayor Yigal Bibi was re-elected.

No election was held in Ramot HaShavim, Savyon, Shavei Tzion and Azor as only one candidate ran for Mayor and Head of the Council respectively, and only one electoral list ran in City and Local council elections.

Katzrin held elections for the first time, where incumbent Head of the Local Council Sami Bar-Lev was elected under the "Katzrin on the Upswing" list.
