= Carmel Shama =

Israeli lawyer and politician

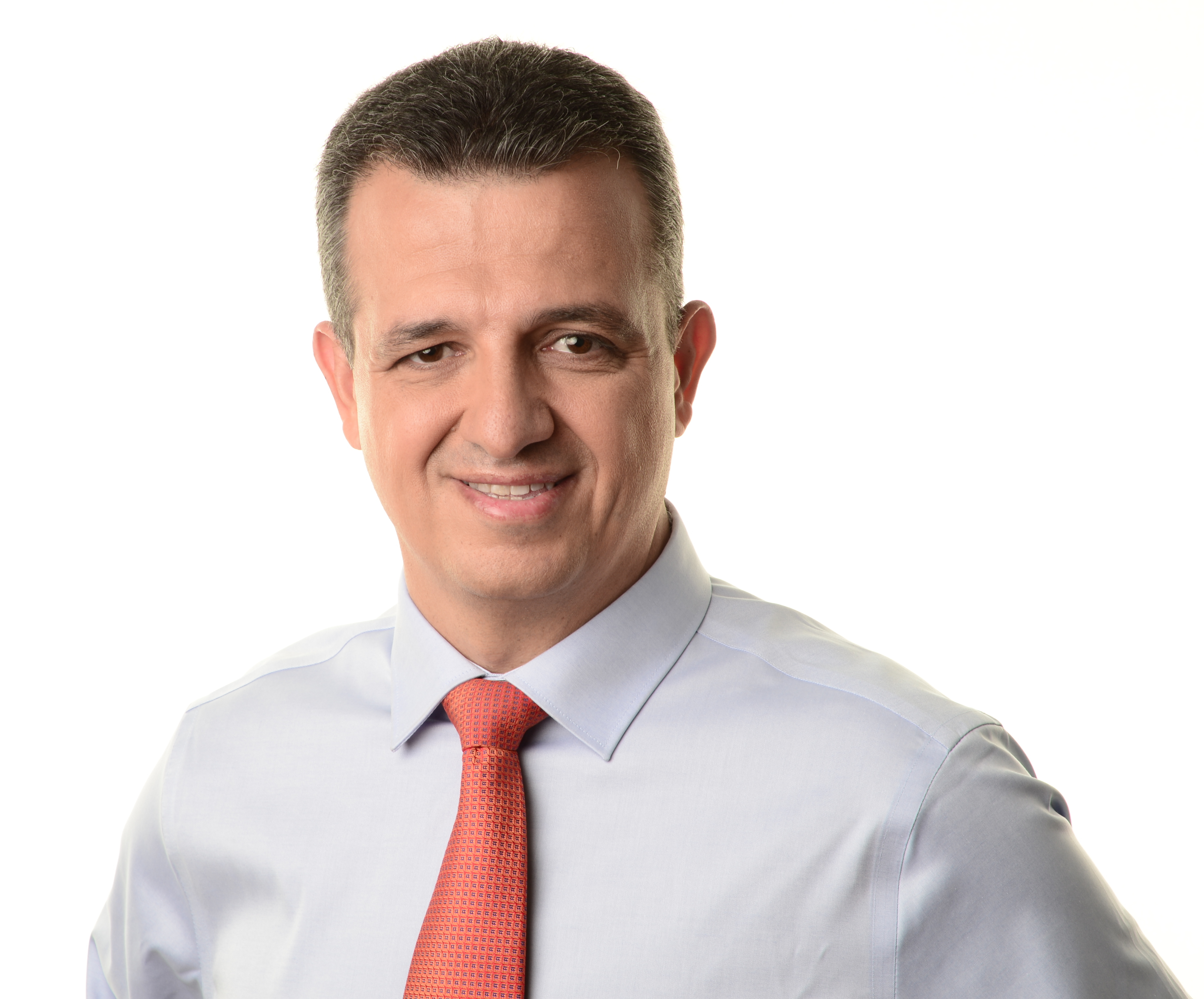
- Shama in 2012

Faction represented in the Knesset
- 2009–2013: Likud
- 2014: Likud

Personal details
- Born: 16 August 1973 (age 52) Ramat Gan, Israel

Carmel Shama-Hacohen (Hebrew: כרמל שאמה הכהן; born 16 August 1973) is an Israeli lawyer and politician. He served as a member of the Knesset for Likud in two spells between 2009 and 2014, before becoming Israel's envoy to the OECD, UNESCO and the Council of Europe. In 2018 he was elected mayor of Ramat Gan.

== Early life ==
Born in Ramat Gan, Shama gained a law degree from the Interdisciplinary Center in Herzliya and is also a certified estate agent. In 2010 he added 'Hacohen' as appendage to his surname to emphasise his Jewishness after many people had mistakenly taken him for a Druze.

== Political career ==
A former chairman of the Likud youth council, in 2002 Shama became chairman of the party's Ramat Gan branch. The following year was elected onto the city council, where he held the environment portfolio. He was also a member of the city's audit commission, where he triggered a police investigation into mayor Zvi Bar over property deals. For the 2009 Knesset elections Shama won twenty-fifth place on the Likud list, the place reserved for youth candidates. He entered the Knesset as the party won 27 seats.

Prior to the 2013 elections Shama was placed 32nd on the joint Likud Yisrael Beiteinu list, losing his seat as the alliance won only 31 seats. Although he returned to the Knesset in June 2014 as a replacement for Reuven Rivlin after he was elected President, Shama resigned on 6 August 2014 after becoming Israel's envoy to the OECD, UNESCO and the Council of Europe. He was replaced in the Knesset by Alex Miller.

In the 2018 municipal elections Shama was elected mayor of Ramat Gan, unseating incumbent Yisrael Zinger.

== Personal life ==
Shama is married to Vered. He has three sons and a daughter, and lives in Ramat Ef'al.
