= Ramat Gan Safari =

Zoological center in the Tel Aviv District, Israel

Coordinates: 32°2′42″N 34°49′30″E

Zoological Center Tel Aviv-Ramat Gan
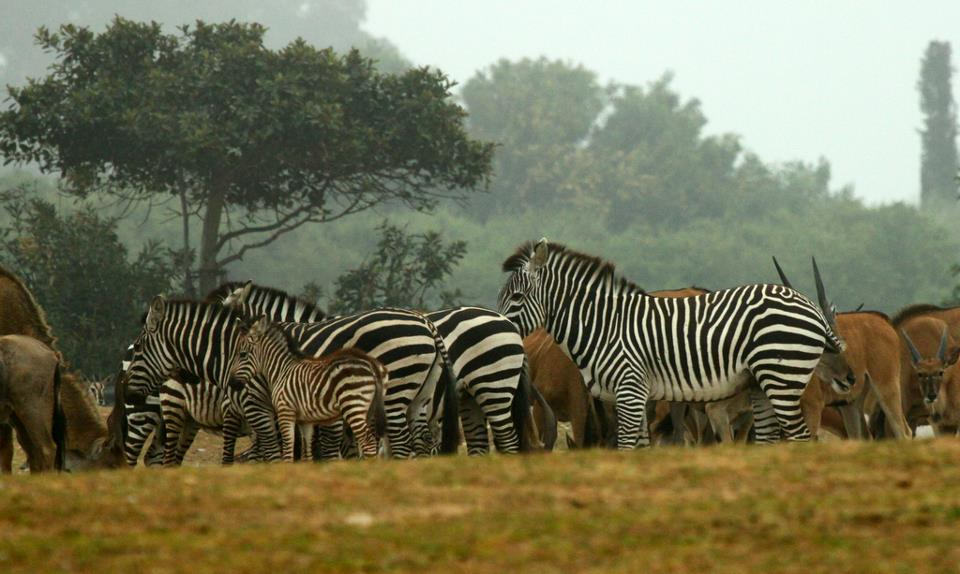
- Interactive map of Zoological Center Tel Aviv-Ramat Gan
- Date opened: 1974
- Location: Ramat Gan, Tel Aviv District, Israel
- Land area: 100 ha (250 acres)
- No. of animals: ~1,550
- No. of species: ~200
- Memberships: EAZA, WAZA, IZA
- Major exhibits: Drive-through African Safari, Gorilla World, Marsh Aviary, South East Asia, Mandrill World, South America, Children's zoo, Elephants
- Website: safari.co.il

The Zoological Center Tel Aviv-Ramat Gan (commonly known as the Safari Ramat Gan) in the Tel Aviv District city of Ramat Gan, Israel, is the largest collection of wildlife in human care in the Middle East. The 250-acre site consists of both a drive-through African safari area and a modern outdoor zoo. The African animal park opened to the general public in 1974. In 1981, the zoo was established in the middle of the park to replace the Tel Aviv Zoo, which had closed down.

Ramat Gan Safari houses 83 species of mammals, 92 species of birds and 23 species of reptiles. Among other outstanding groups of animals, it has white rhinos, hippos, lions, African and Asian elephants, chimpanzees, gorillas, orangutans, and a Komodo dragon. The animals are seen in open air enclosures amid subtropical gardens.

The Ramat Gan Safari has sent animals to the Qalqilya Zoo in the West Bank of the Palestinian territories and maintains close ties with the veterinarians in the Palestinian Authority.

Safari Ramat Gan has more than 700,000 visitors annually.

== History ==
=== Safari Park ===
The Safari began as a small children's zoo in the Ramat Gan National Park in 1958. In the late 1960s, the founding director Mr. Zvi Kirmeyer, was inspired by the novel concept of Safari Parks which were developing around the world during 1966-1974. He convinced the first mayor of Ramat Gan, Avraham Krinitzi, that a drive-through Safari Park in Israel was a viable idea. Following the death of Mayor Krinitzi in an auto accident in 1969, the project continued with the active involvement of the next mayor of Ramat Gan, Dr. Yisrael Peled. Half of the existing National Park in Ramat Gan was dedicated to the new entity called The Zoological Corporation of Ramat Gan (250 acres). The Israeli landscape architect firm Miller-Blum-Lederer designed the park. The animals were supplied by Carr-Hartley from Tanzania, in 1968 and 1972 and included seven African elephants, eight white rhinos, Grant's zebras, Thomson's gazelles, defassa waterbuck, eland, ostriches, Masai giraffe, Grant's gazelles, beisa oryx, dik-diks, Grévy's zebra and De Brazza's monkeys. The drive-through Safari park opened to the public in 1974 although no formal opening was held due to the Yom Kippur War. To this day the drive-through African Safari section, with its large and dynamic mixed herds of 13 species of mammals and birds, is the signature area for the visitor experience.

=== From the old Tel Aviv Zoo to a new zoo in the Safari ===
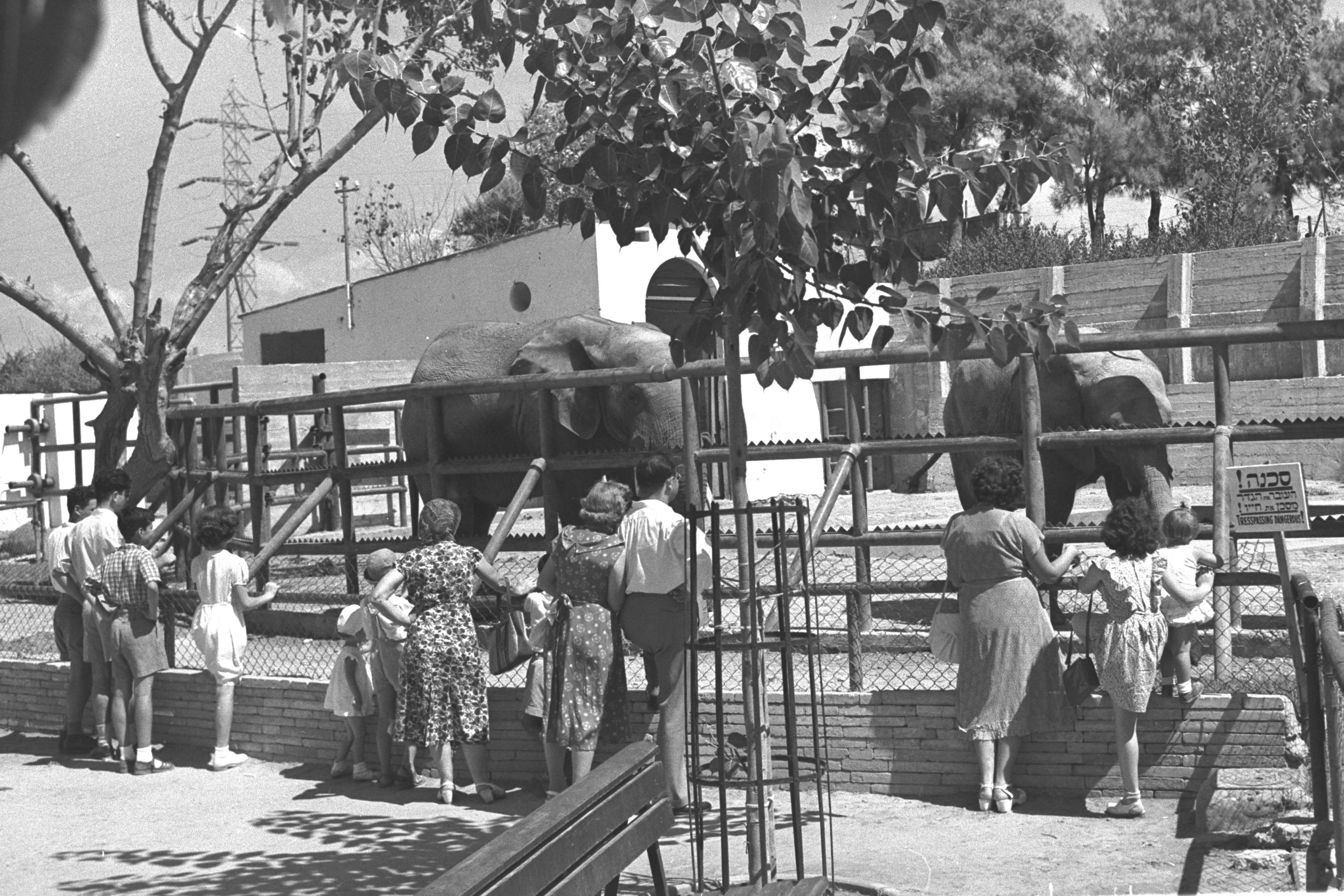
Tel Aviv Zoo

In the late 1970s it was clear that the old Tel Aviv Zoo, founded in 1938 by Rabbi Dr. Mordecai Schornstein, had to close. Situated adjacent to the City Hall of Tel Aviv, it was a nuisance due to noise, traffic and smell. The physical spaces for the animals were no longer acceptable according to modern zoo practice; the real estate value of the property was great. An agreement was reached between the cities of Tel Aviv and Ramat Gan to construct a new zoo within the space of the Zoological Corporation of Ramat Gan, to house the collection from the old Tel Aviv Zoo, thereby concentrating a major animal attraction in one place in the center of Israel. The new administrative entity, the Zoological Center Tel Aviv-Ramat Gan is owned jointly by the two municipalities. The design team included the director Mr. Kirmeyer, the architects Miller-Blum-Lederer and external advisor, Professor Lothar Dittrich, director of Hanover Zoo, and was based on the best of European zoo design in the late 1970s. The mild Mediterranean climate enabled the development of large open enclosures amid lush subtropical gardens. The new zoo within the drive-through African Safari opened in 1981, following two years of construction at a cost of US$2.5 million of that time.

== Affiliations ==
The Safari is a full member of the European Association of Zoos and Aquaria (EAZA) since 2007, World Association of Zoos and Aquariums (WAZA) since 1990 and a founding member of Israeli Zoo Association (IZA), established in 2002.

Professional staff are members of International Zoo Educators(IZE) and European Association of Zoo Veterinarians (EAZV). The Safari's animals are registered in Zoological Information Management System (ZIMS), the international registry for zoo animals.

== Breeding and conservation ==
The Safari participated in 60 international and local endangered species breeding programs primarily within the European Association of Zoos and Aquaria (EEP European Endangered Species Programs, ESB European Studbook programs).

=== Local projects ===
The Safari participates also in local captive breeding projects which support declining or extinct raptor populations in Israel. Over the years 2003–2012 the Safari bred griffon vultures and white-tailed sea eagles. Six of the eagles were reared and released in the wild by the government Israel Nature and Parks Authority (INPA). A collaborative attempt of the Safari, INPA and the Jerusalem Biblical Zoo to release zoo bred sand cats in 2009 in the desert sands of Kibbutz Lotan was not successful.

=== Elephants ===
The outstanding breeding records for both African and Asian elephants are internationally acknowledged. The first African elephant, Yossi, born in 1974 in the Safari, became a legendary breeding male. His first offspring were born in 1987, a remarkable year, since all six female African elephants delivered calves, two of them on the same day.

The Asian elephants Motek and Warda had already begun breeding in the old Tel Aviv Zoo before being transferred to Ramat Gan.

As of 2013, 21 African and 14 Asian elephants were born (and survived) in the Safari.

=== Rhinos ===
In 1978 the first white rhino was born at the Safari; he was named Shalom since he was born on the day of signing of the Camp David Peace Agreement. Since 1978 (and up to 2013), a total of 17 surviving rhino calves were born. As a commitment to breeding this highly endangered species two young females were imported from Pretoria Zoo in 2012.

=== Hippos ===
The hippo family grew from a pair originating in the old Tel Aviv Zoo and at its peak reached 40 animals.

=== Gorillas ===
The current family group of gorillas, established in 1997, is well known for a stable social structure and its fertility. Lukas, the male, came from Apenheul Zoo in Apeldoorn, Netherlands, while females Leah and Anya came from Frankfurt and Rotterdam Zoos. As of 2013, nine surviving youngsters have been born and of these six have been sent to other zoos.

== Animal welfare ==
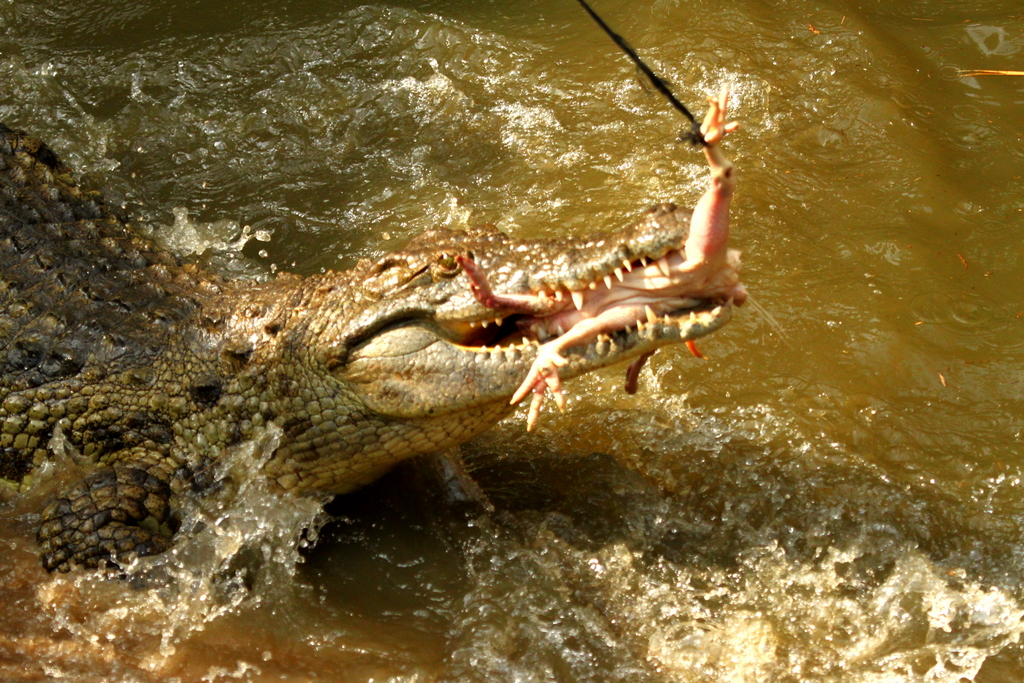
Enrichment at the Safari zoo

A 'Training & Enrichment' department was established in 2008 to improve the quality of the animals' lives. Animals are now trained to voluntarily participate in their own care. This technique is known to reduce stress caused by medical and husbandry procedures. A study conducted on the Safari's chimpanzees has shown that protected contact training significantly reduces the chimpanzees' social stress. Behavioral enrichment is incorporated into daily animal care routine. Enrichment encourages natural behaviors and provides interesting experiences for both animals and zoo visitors.

== Special tours ==
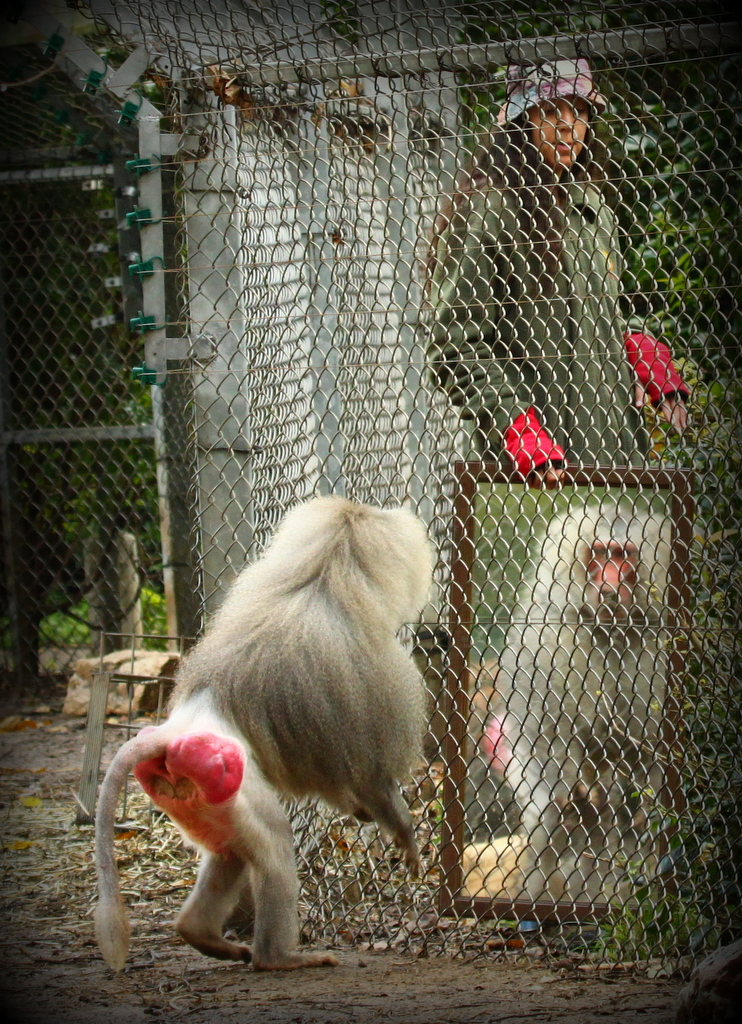
Zoo-ology course, focusing on animal behavior

The Safari offers a variety of classes, programs and activities for the general public, including school groups, adult education, summer camps, and special education. These include:

- Safari around the clock – Guided tours on the Safari train takes visitors on pre-booked visits in the early morning and cooler hours of afternoon and evening.
- V.I.P tour – Special behind-the-scenes tour for small groups.
- Workshops for families – The theme of parents and offspring is the favorite topic.
- Day camp – Activities for children age 5–11 for five-day sessions during the school holidays. The topics change annually.
- After-school club – For children who are interested in animals.
- Teen keepers – Junior animal keepers work in animal care and study animal behavior during a one-week summer camp.
- Zoo-ology – Courses for adults interested in animals. Topics include animal life history, biodiversity and conservation issues. Sequential units include basic introduction, animal behavior, bio-inspiration.
- Seniors group tours – Focusing on the third age in the animal kingdom.
- Schools connected in depth with the Safari – A nearby magnet school for natural sciences and environment has a spiral program of learning at the Safari from Grades 1-8, integrating zoo activities and visits. The program is jointly planned by the zoo and the school.
- Special needs education – Young people at risk, rehabilitation institutions, and many other special needs groups make use of the Safari facilities and guides.

== Israel Wildlife Hospital ==
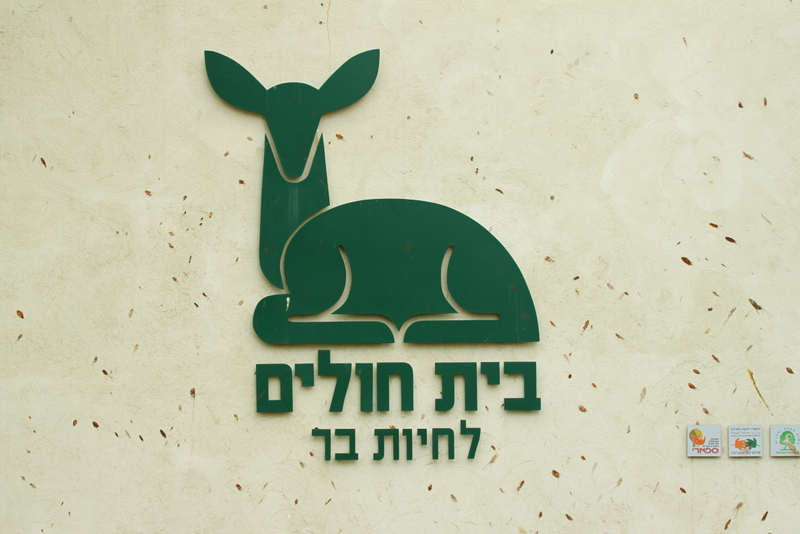
Israel Wildlife Hospital

The Israeli Wildlife Hospital (IWH) was founded in 2005 as a cooperative enterprise between Ramat Gan Safari and the government Israel Nature and Parks Authority (INPA). The IWH treats over 2,000 wild animals annually. As Israel is located on a central migration route (over half a billion birds migrate over Israel every migratory season) the IWH receives more than 100 avian species every year. Birds compose majority (83.5%) of the animals treated per annum, followed by mammals (11.4%), reptiles (5%) and amphibians (0.1%). Human interventions are the most common causes of injury and include injury by feral and domesticated cats and dogs, road traffic accidents, illegal capture and persecution, electrocution from high tension power lines, and poisonings. In 2010, a new clinic was inaugurated in the presence of the president of Israel, Shimon Peres, minister of environment Gilad Erdan, the mayor of Ramat Gan, Zvi Bar, and the director of the Israel National Parks Association. The new facility has separate treatment and surgery rooms, in addition to state of the art equipment for research laboratory and X-ray imaging facility.

== Archaeological excavations ==
In March 2021, archaeologists announced the discovery of two 1,800-year-old sarcophagi, ancient stone coffins dating to the Roman period. Researchers assumed that the sarcophagi belonged to high status people buried near Safari Park. The 6.5-foot-long coffins were crafted with limestone mined and designed with Greco-Roman symbolic discs and flower garlands.

== Gallery ==
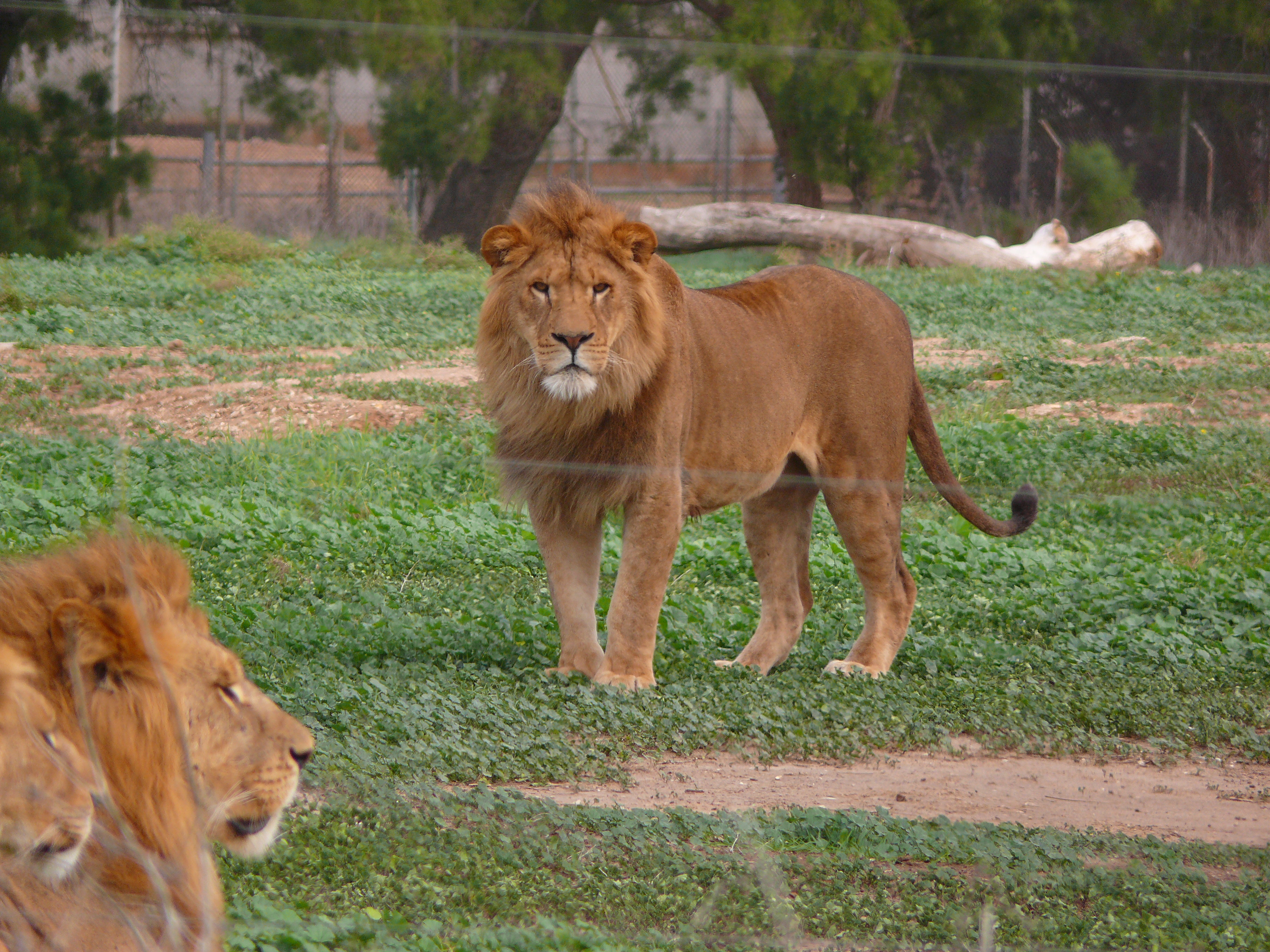
Lion in the drive-through safari

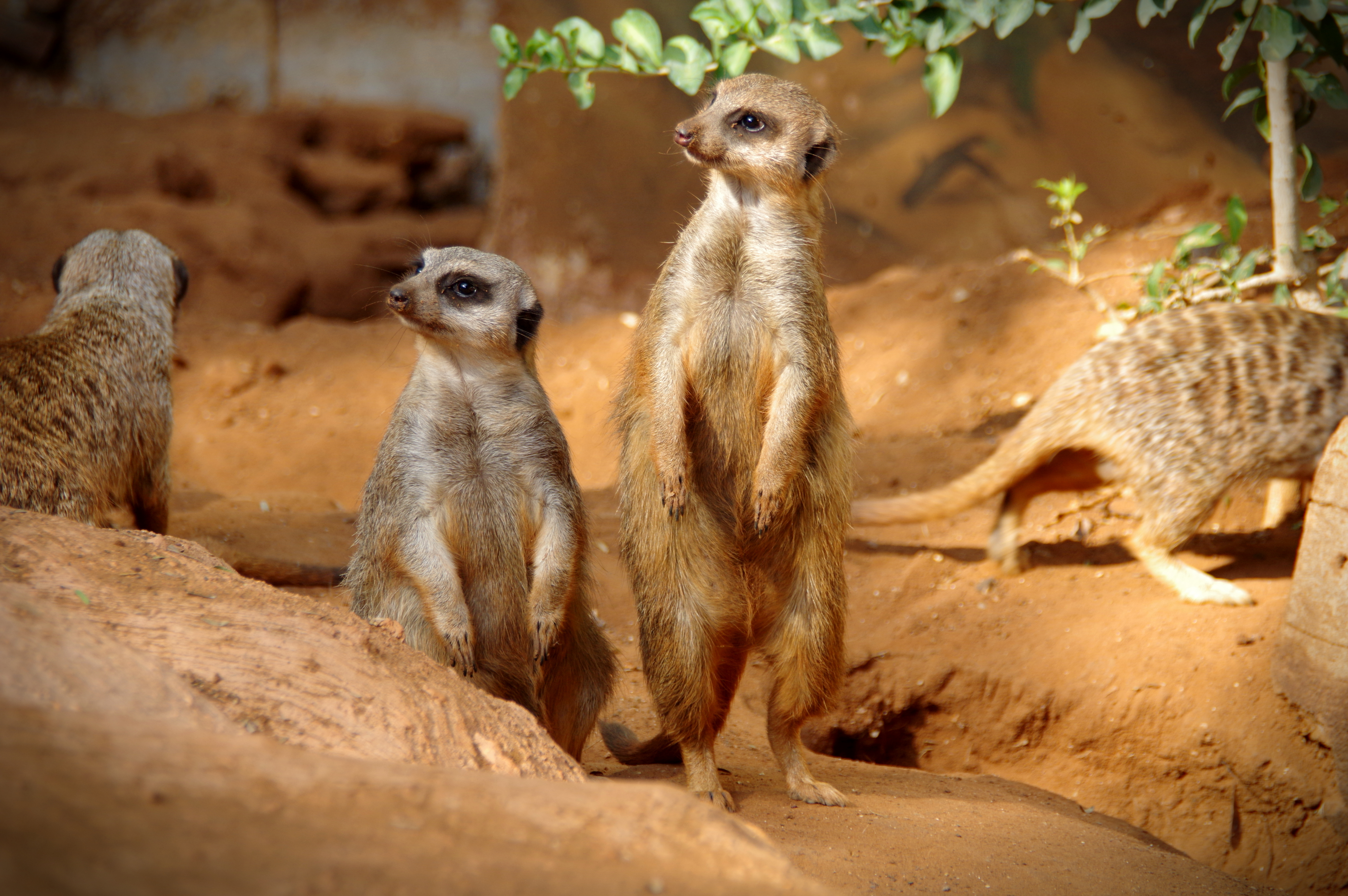
Two meerkats at the Ramat Gan's Safari

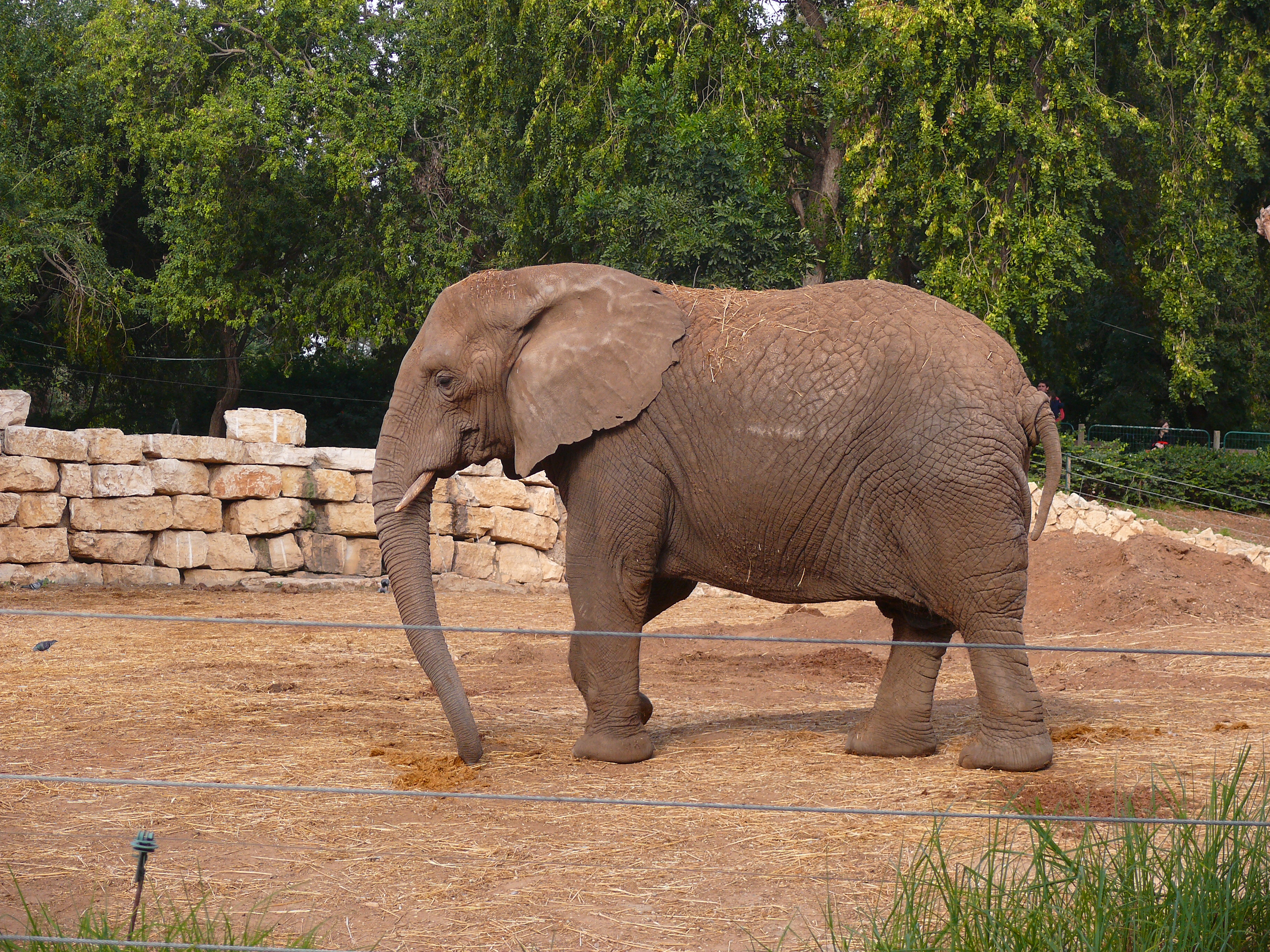
African elephant in the zoo

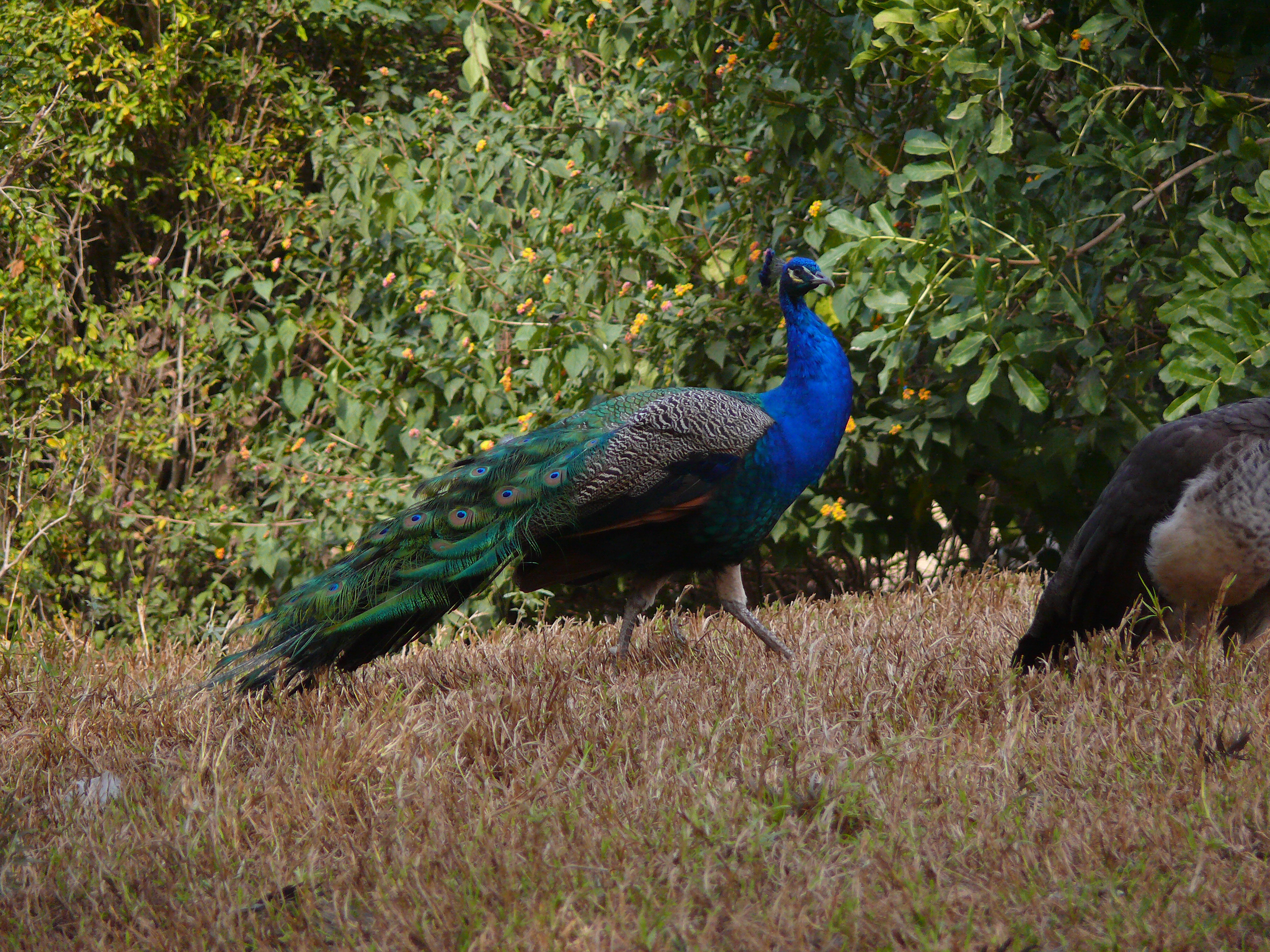
Indian peafowl free in the zoo

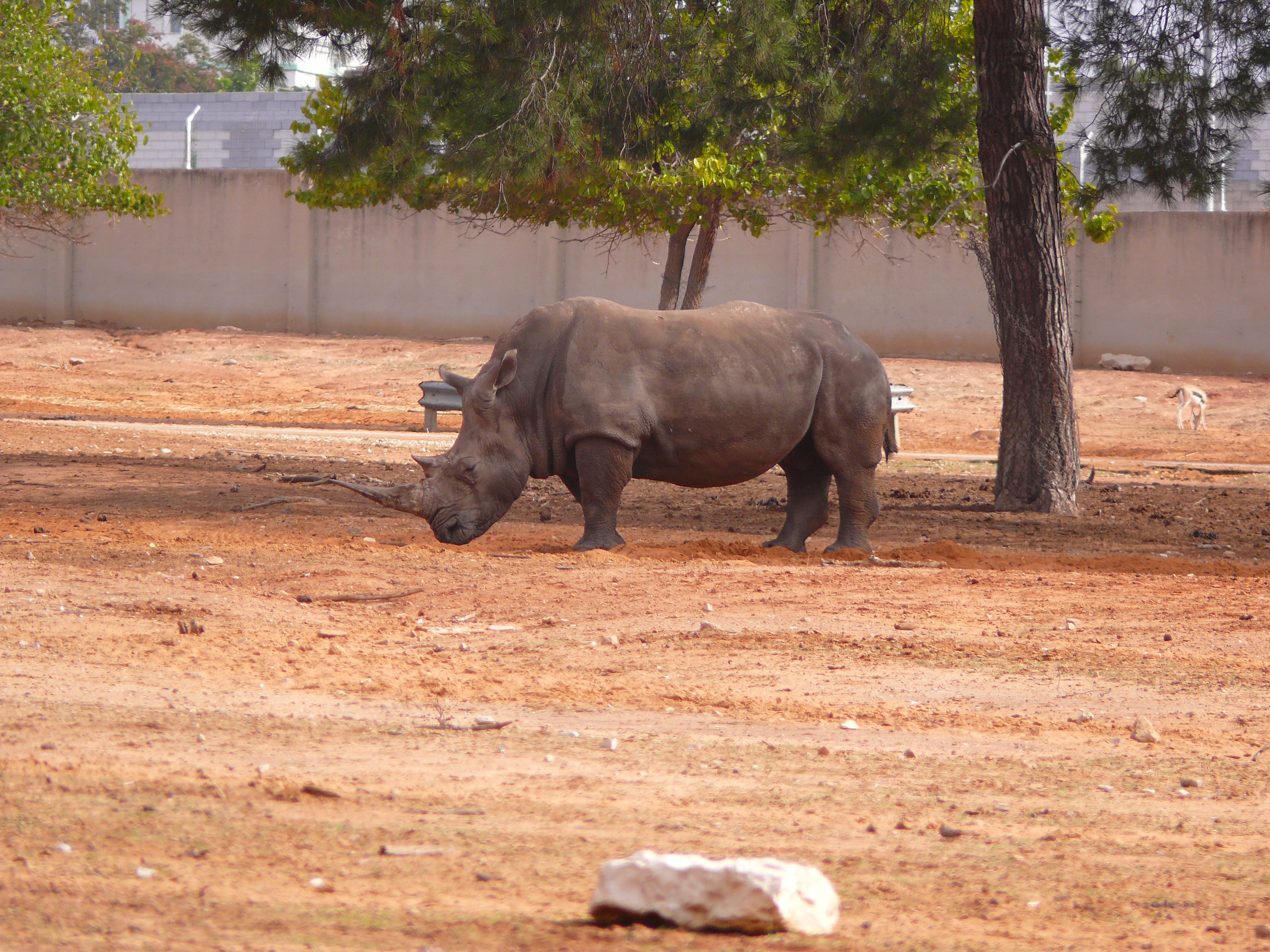
White rhinoceros in the drive-through safari

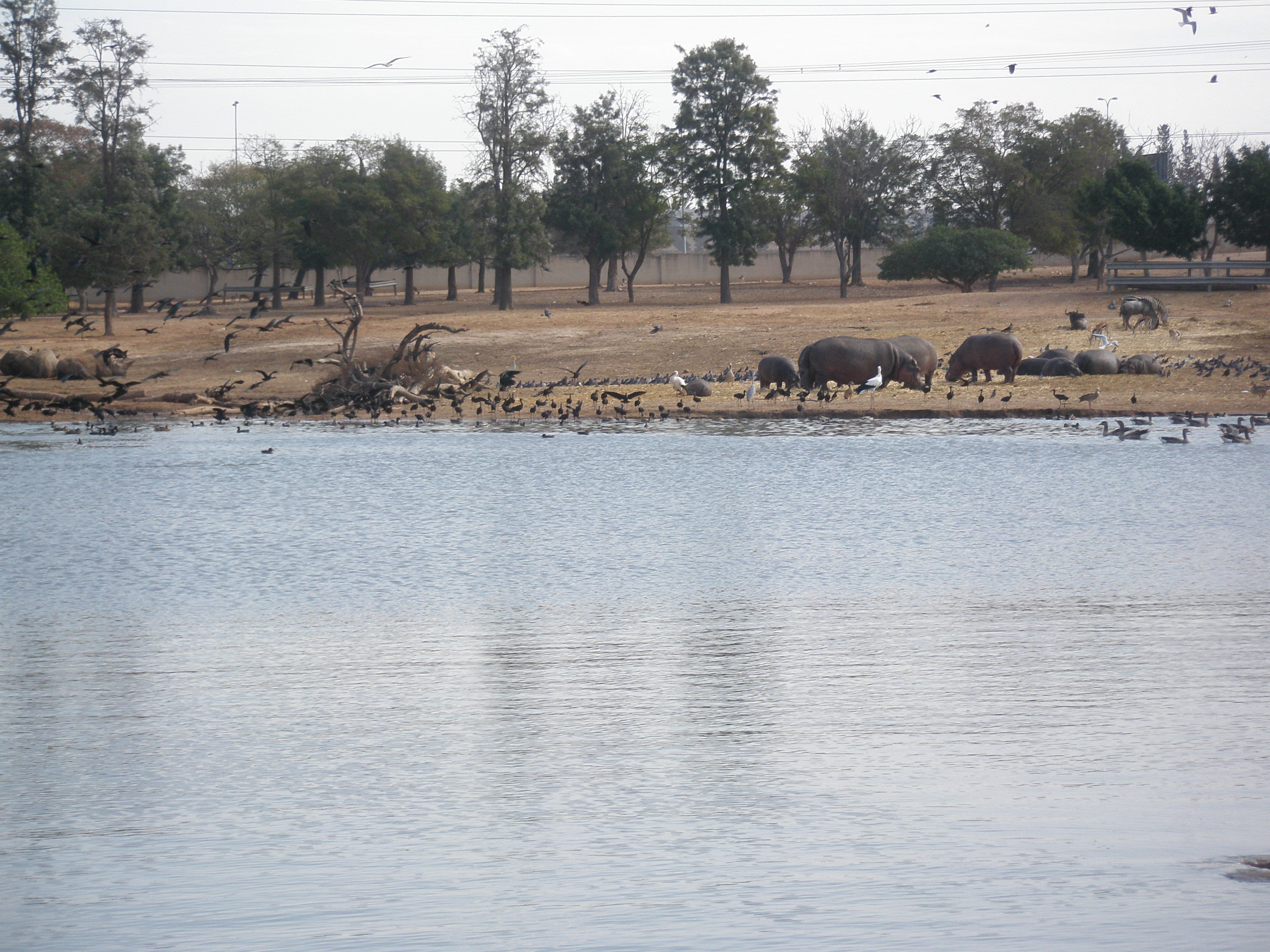
Lake and animals in the drive-through safari
