= Ramat Gan National Park =

Urban park in Tel Aviv District, Israel

Coordinates: 32°2′57.21″N 34°49′32.89″E

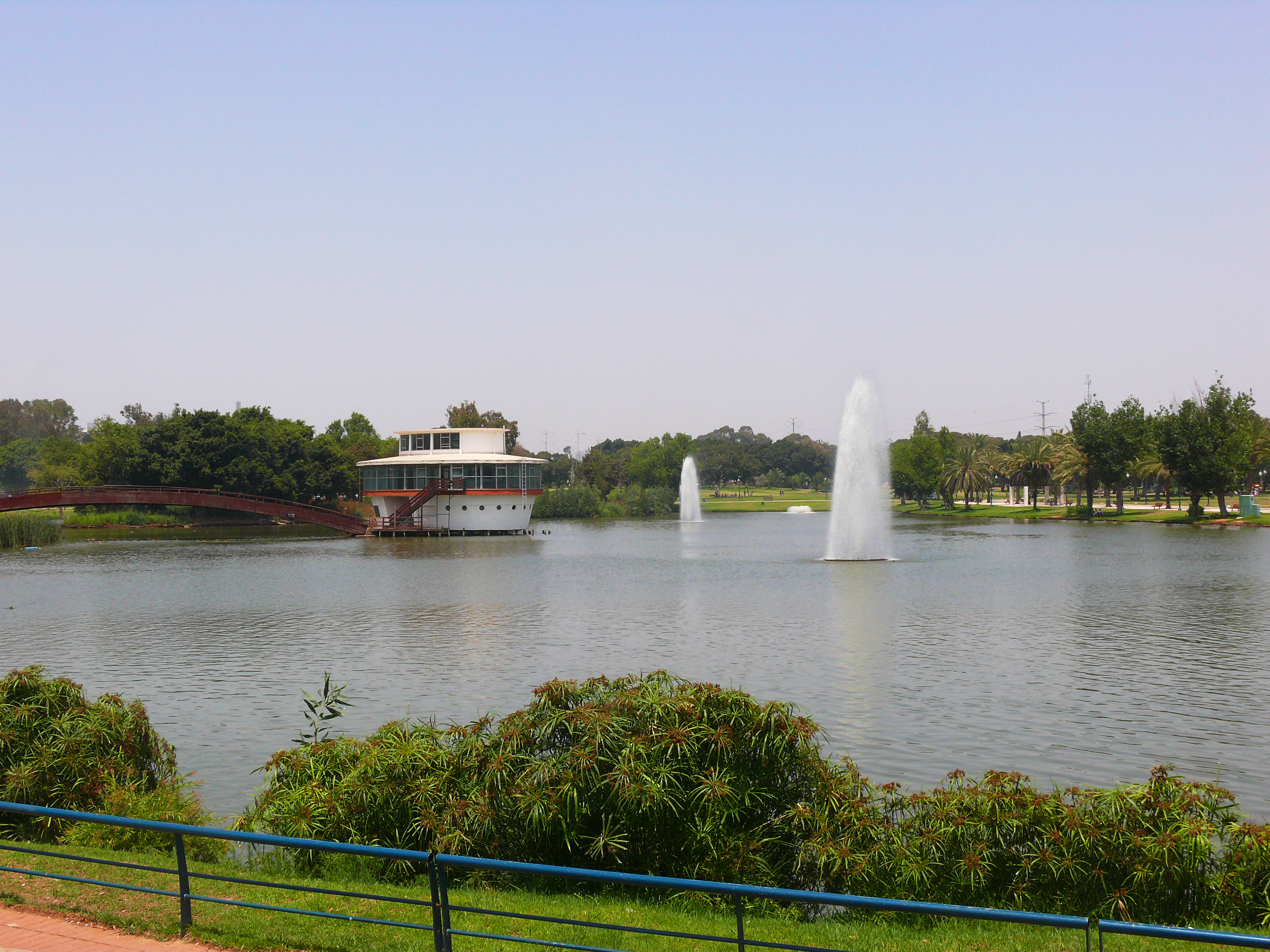
Lake in Ramat Gan park

Ramat Gan National Park (Hebrew: הפארק הלאומי, HaPark HaLe'umi) is a large urban park in the Tel Aviv District city of Ramat Gan, Israel. It is not actually a national park.

== History ==
The initiator of the idea of setting up the park was the first mayor of Ramat Gan Avraham Krinitzi who actively promoted the idea. Krinitzi advocated for setting it in the southern part of the city. He is also buried there with his son-in-law and driver, who all died in a car accident together on their way back from the city of Acre, where he was the owner of a porcelain factory at the time.

The planting began in February 1951 and the park opened to the public in 1953. In 1959, an artificial lake was created, which was enlarged throughout the years.

The park covers an area of 1.9 km^{2}. It is the second largest urban park in Israel, after the Yarkon Park. The park attracts 700-800 thousand visitors annually. The Ramat Gan Safari is adjacent to the park. Recently, a waterfall was added to the park as an expansion to the lake.
