= 1965 Israeli municipal elections =

Local elections in several municipalities and councils in Israel

Municipal elections took place in Israel on 2 November 1965, alongside elections to the sixth Knesset.

== Elections by Municipality ==
=== In Cities ===
In Jerusalem, Incumbent Alignment mayor Mordechai Ish-Shalom was opposed by Rafi candidate Teddy Kollek. both parties won five out of 21 seats in the City Council. Ultimately, Kollek managed to form a municipal coalition and was appointed mayor.

In Tel Aviv, the Alignment, led by incumbent mayor Mordechai Namir and Gahal, led by Mordechai-Haim Stern, both won 12 out of 31 seats in the City Council. The religious list won three seats, Rafi won two, while the Independent Liberal Party and Mapam won one seat each. Ultimately, Namir managed to form a municipal coalition and was re-elected mayor.

In Haifa, the Alignment, led by Abba Hushi, won 10 out of 31 seats in the City Council. Gahal won five seats, the Religious List and Mapai won two seats each, while the Independent Liberal party and Mapam won one seat each.

Mapai candidates were re-elected to lead municipal councils in the following cities:

- Eilat (led by Yosef Levi)
- Bat Yam (led by Menachem Rothschild)
- Givatayim (led by Ya'akov Kreisman, who was chosen to replace retiring mayor Shimon Ben-Zvi)
- Herzliya (led by Pesach Yifhar)
- Holon (led by Pinhas Eylon)
- Lod (led by Zvi Izkovich)
- Nahariya (led by Gershon Tatz)
- Rishon LeZion (led by Aryeh Sheftel)

Gahal candidates were elected to lead municipal councils in the following cities:

- Ashkelon (led by Rehavia Adivi)
- Hadera (led by Dov Barzilay)
- Netanya (led by Moshe Shaked)

In Bnei Brak, Poalei Agudat Yisrael, led by Reuven Aharonivich, was re-elected to lead the municipal government.

In Nazareth, Maki won 7 of 15 seats in the City Council.

=== In Regional Councils ===
Mafdal won local elections in Ofakim and Or Akiva.

Rafi won in Dimona, where they were led by Armon Ladro.

In Yesud HaMa'ala, two local lists ran against each other. Local lists defeated the Alignment in Metula and Kiryat Bialik. In Ramot HaShavim, Shavei Tzion and Kfar Tavor local lists ran unopposed and were automatically awarded all seats on their respective councils.

In Daliyat al-Karmel, Gahal won the most seats.

In Maghar, 19 lists ran for the local council, but none crossed the electoral threshold.

In Jisr az-Zarqa, the candidate of the Progress and Development party was elected to lead the local council.
