= Yisrael Zinger =

Israeli politician

Yisrael Zinger ישראל זינגר
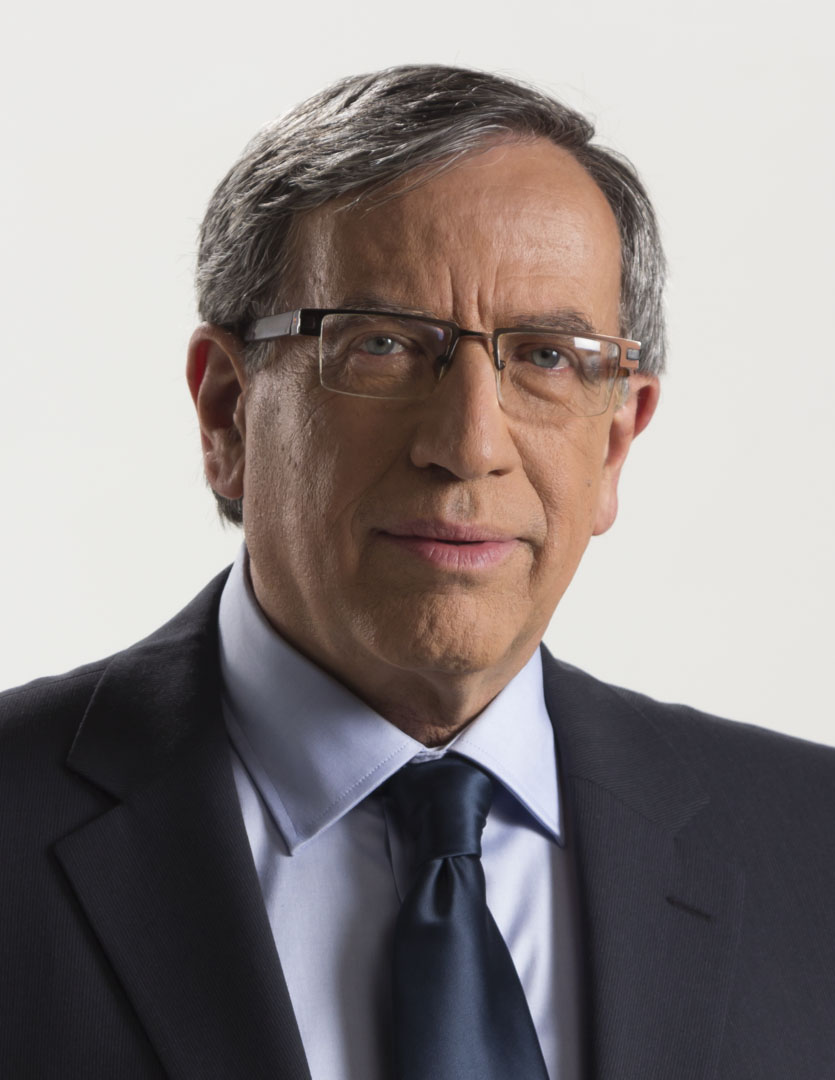

5th Mayor of Ramat Gan
- In office October 22, 2013 – November 14, 2018
- Preceded by: Zvi Bar
- Succeeded by: Carmel Shama

Personal details
- Born: January 18, 1948 (age 78) Bucharest, Romania
- Party: New Ramat Gan

Yisrael Raul Zinger (Hebrew: ישראל זינגר; born December 18, 1948) is an Israeli politician and former mayor of Ramat Gan (2013–2018).

== Biography ==
Zinger was born in 1948 in Bucharest, Romania. He immigrated to Israel with his family in 1962 and earned a master's degree in nuclear physics in 1978 from Tel Aviv University. In 1985 he was appointed principal of Blich high school, a position he held until 2003. Zinger is married and he has three children.

=== Political career ===
In the 2003 elections, Zinger ran for mayor of Ramat Gan and was elected to the city council. In the 2008 elections, he ran for a second term. He led the municipal opposition until 2013.

In the 2013 elections, he ran for the third time for mayor of Ramat Gan against Carmel Shama-Hacohen of Likud. He was elected with 52.4% of the vote. His faction won four seats.

On 15 December 2014, Zinger was placed under house arrest for a week due to corruption suspicions. He had to interrupt his activity at the city hall for two weeks. In 2018 the inquiry was concluded with no proof of guilt. The same year, he lost the position of mayor to Likud's Carmel Shama-Hacohen.

Political offices
Preceded by Zvi Bar	Mayor of Ramat Gan; 2013–2018	Succeeded by Carmel Shama
