= Uri Amit =

Israeli politician

Uri Amit אורי עמית
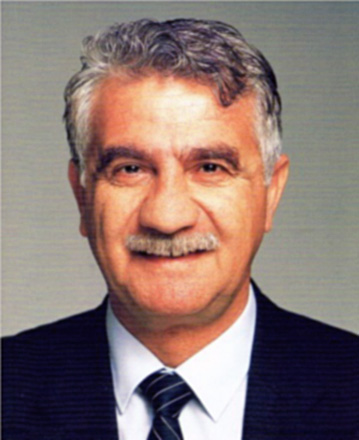

3rd Mayor of Ramat Gan
- In office 1983–1989
- Preceded by: Yisrael Peled
- Succeeded by: Zvi Bar

Personal details
- Born: January 6, 1934 Baghdad, Iraq
- Died: October 18, 2011 (aged 77) Ramat Gan, Israel
- Party: Labor

Uri Amit (Hebrew: אורי עמית; January 6, 1934 – October 18, 2011) was an Israeli politician who served as the third mayor of Ramat Gan between 1983 and 1989.

== Biography ==
Amit was born in Baghdad, Iraq in 1934. At the age of five, his family immigrated to Mandatory Palestine. As a child he came to Ramat Gan, where relatives had lived since 1927. However, after a short time the family returned to Iraq, where their house was used as a centre for the HeHalutz Zionist movement.

Amit returned to independent Israel in 1949 at age 16. He went to school in the Ben Shemen Youth Village and later moved to kibbutz Yagur. After his military service in the Israel Air Force, Amit began working in development projects in the Negev and joined the Mapai party, which later merged into the Labor Party.

In 1959 he was sent by the party to the Institute of Education in Beit Berl. From which he moved to Ramat Gan in the early 1960s, he subsequently became active within Mapai youth circles within the City, and from 1963 served as secretary of the Histadrut in the Ramat Gan-Givatayim Workers' Council for more than 12 years, He was also one of the founders of the "Integration Department" (a Mapai youth group founded by university graduates) and a member of its national board.

=== Political career ===
In 1983 he ran successfully for mayor of Ramat Gan against incumbent Yisrael Peled and beat him to become the first Labor Party mayor of the city. During his term as mayor he closed polluting factories, preparing the infrastructure development in the Diamond Exchange District, improved infrastructure, increased the size of gardens in the city and opened the Museum of Israeli Art. Improving the tax collection rate in the city led to a substantial budget surplus.

In the 1989 elections, Amit was defeated by Likud candidate Zvi Bar. However, Amit remained an opposition councillor until 2003, and Reportedly had ties to Ehud Barak.

In 1989, he was prosecuted for bribery. Allegedly, the Dan Cooperative paid a sum of $5000 to a municipal local newspaper at his request to promote his personal interest as mayor of Ramat Gan, in exchange for speeding up the procedures needed to complete the transfer of the Cooperative's in Gali Gil neighborhood in Ramat Gan. On January 27, 1993, Amit was convicted in the district court, and sentenced to nine months probation and a fine of NIS 11,000. His appeal to the Supreme Court was denied.

=== Death ===
Amit died in October 2011 and is buried in Herzliya.

Political offices
Preceded by Yisrael Peled	Mayor of Ramat Gan; 1983–1989	Succeeded by Zvi Bar
