= Mordechai-Haim Stern =

Israeli politician

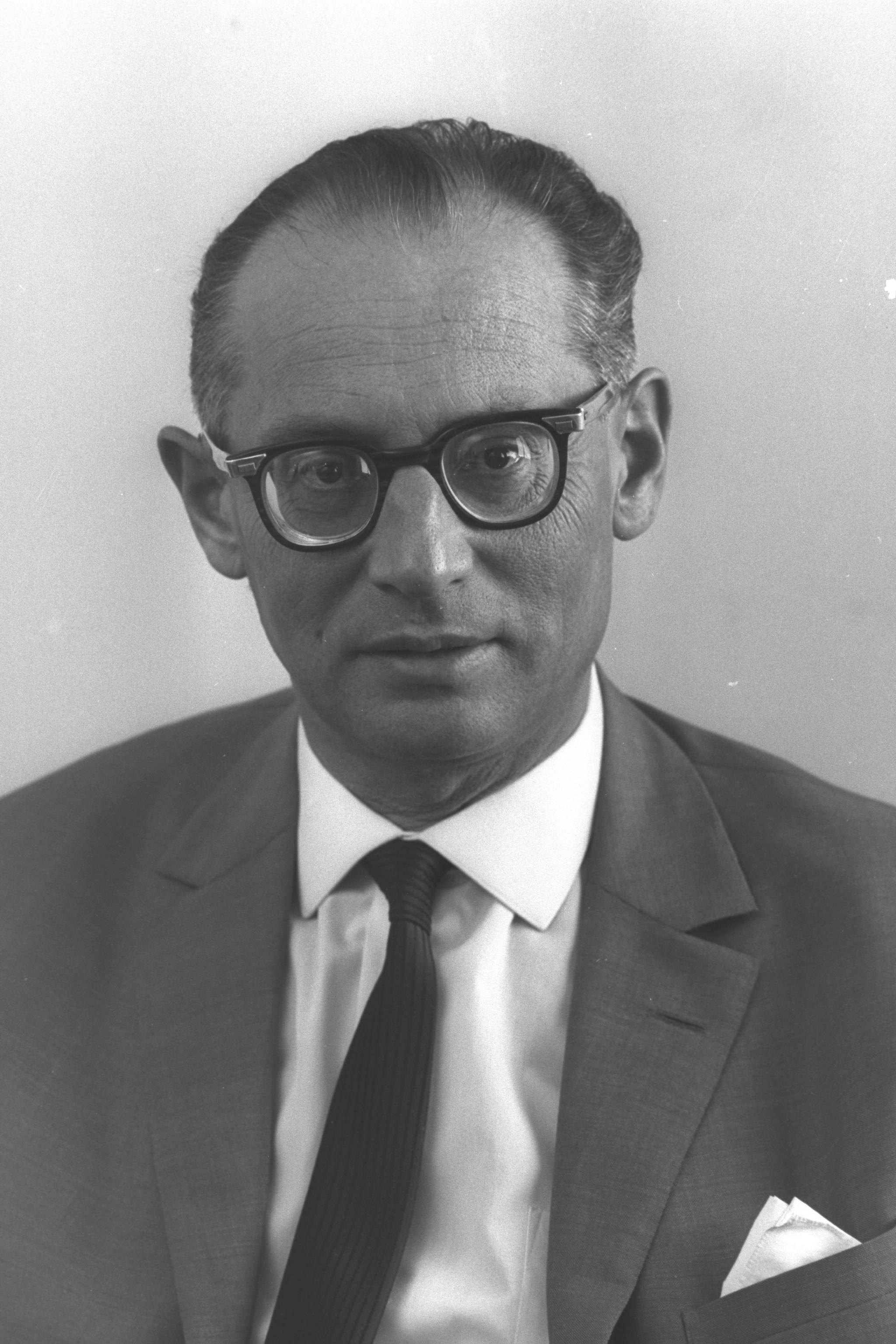
- Stern in 1965

Faction represented in the Knesset
- 1965–1969: Gahal

Personal details
- Born: 16 October 1914 Vienna, Austria-Hungary
- Died: 21 February 1975 (aged 60)

Mordechai-Haim Stern (Hebrew: מרדכי-חיים שטרן; 16 October 1914 – 21 February 1975) was an Israeli politician who served as a member of the Knesset for Gahal between 1965 and 1969.

== Biography ==
Born in Vienna in Austria-Hungary, Stern studied medicine at the University of Vienna, but did not graduate. In 1934, he immigrated to Mandatory Palestine. He worked at the Anglo-Palestine Bank, where he became a senior executive, and was involved in transferring Jewish assets out of Nazi Germany. He also worked for the Mandate authorities as an income tax supervisor. In 1945 he became a deputy director of the Rassco housing company, a post he held until 1957 when he became a director. He remained a director until 1970.

In 1942 Stern was amongst the founders of the New Aliyah Party, which later merged into the Progressive Party, of which he was a member of the board of directors. In 1959 he became a member of Tel Aviv city council. As the Progressive Party merged into the Liberal Party, which in turn formed the Gahal alliance, Stern was elected to the Knesset on the Gahal list in 1965, but lost his seat in the 1969 elections.

He died in 1975 at the age of 60.
