= Avraham Krinitzi =

Israeli politician (1886–1969)

Avraham Krinitzi אברהם קריניצי
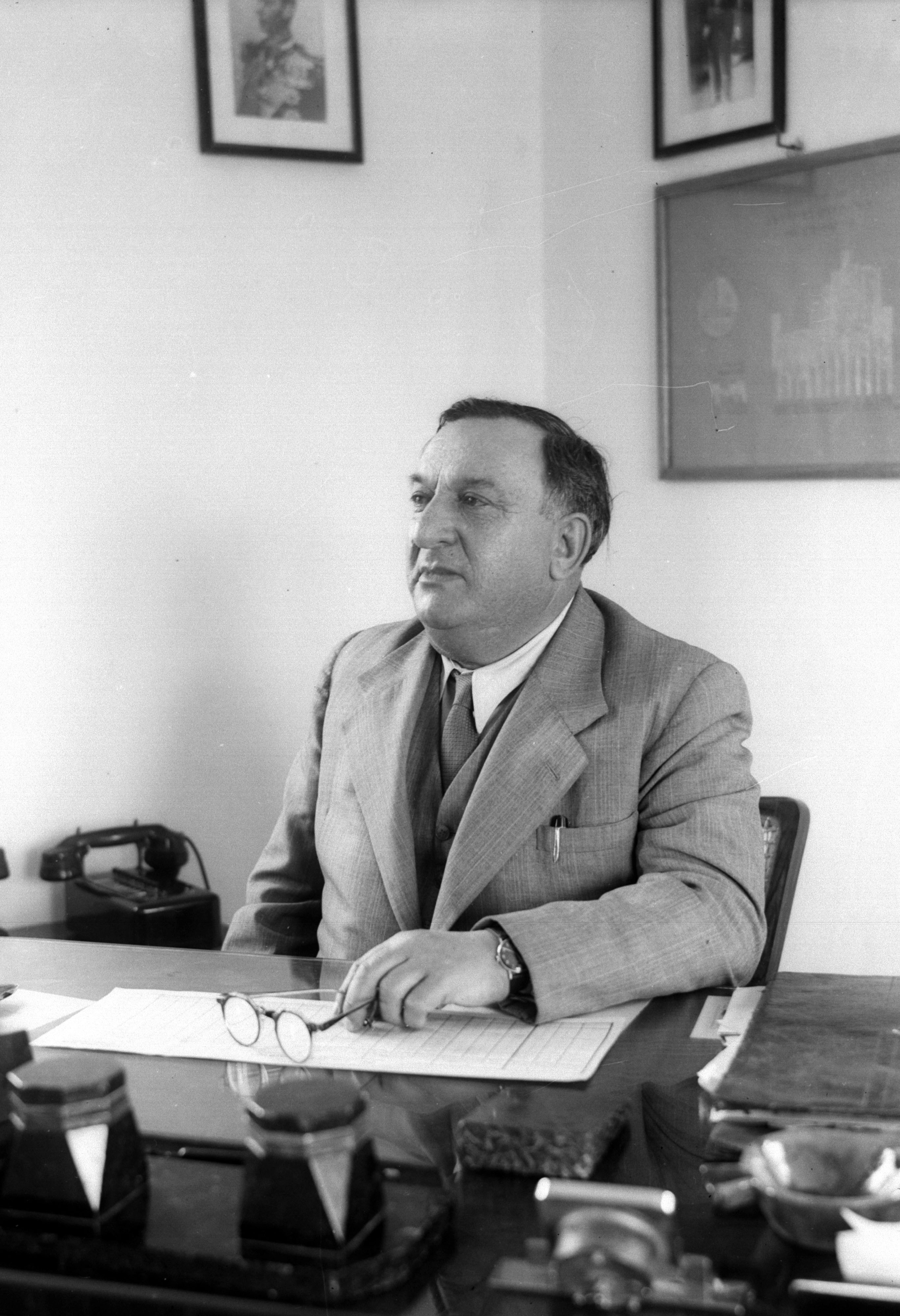
- Krinitzi in 1945

1st Mayor of Ramat Gan
- In office 1926–1969
- Succeeded by: Yisrael Peled

Personal details
- Born: 26 December 1886 Grodno, Russian Empire
- Died: 13 November 1969 (aged 82) Ramat Gan, Israel
- Party: General Zionists

Avraham Krinitzi, sometimes spelled Krinizi, (Hebrew: אברהם קריניצי; 26 December 1886 – 13 November 1969) was an Israeli politician who served as the first mayor of Ramat Gan between 1926 and 1969.

== Biography ==
Avraham Krinitzi was born in Grodno in the Russian Empire (in present-day Belarus). In 1905 he immigrated to Ottoman-ruled Palestine during the Second Aliyah. He became involved in settlement activities and security and was one of the early members of the Haganah. During World War I he worked for the Ottoman railways.

In November 1969, shortly after his election for mayor for the twelfth term, he died in a car accident along with his son-in-law Yeshayahu Shmuelevich and his driver Baruch Azani. The three were buried in a special gravesite at the Ramat Gan National Park.

== Political career ==
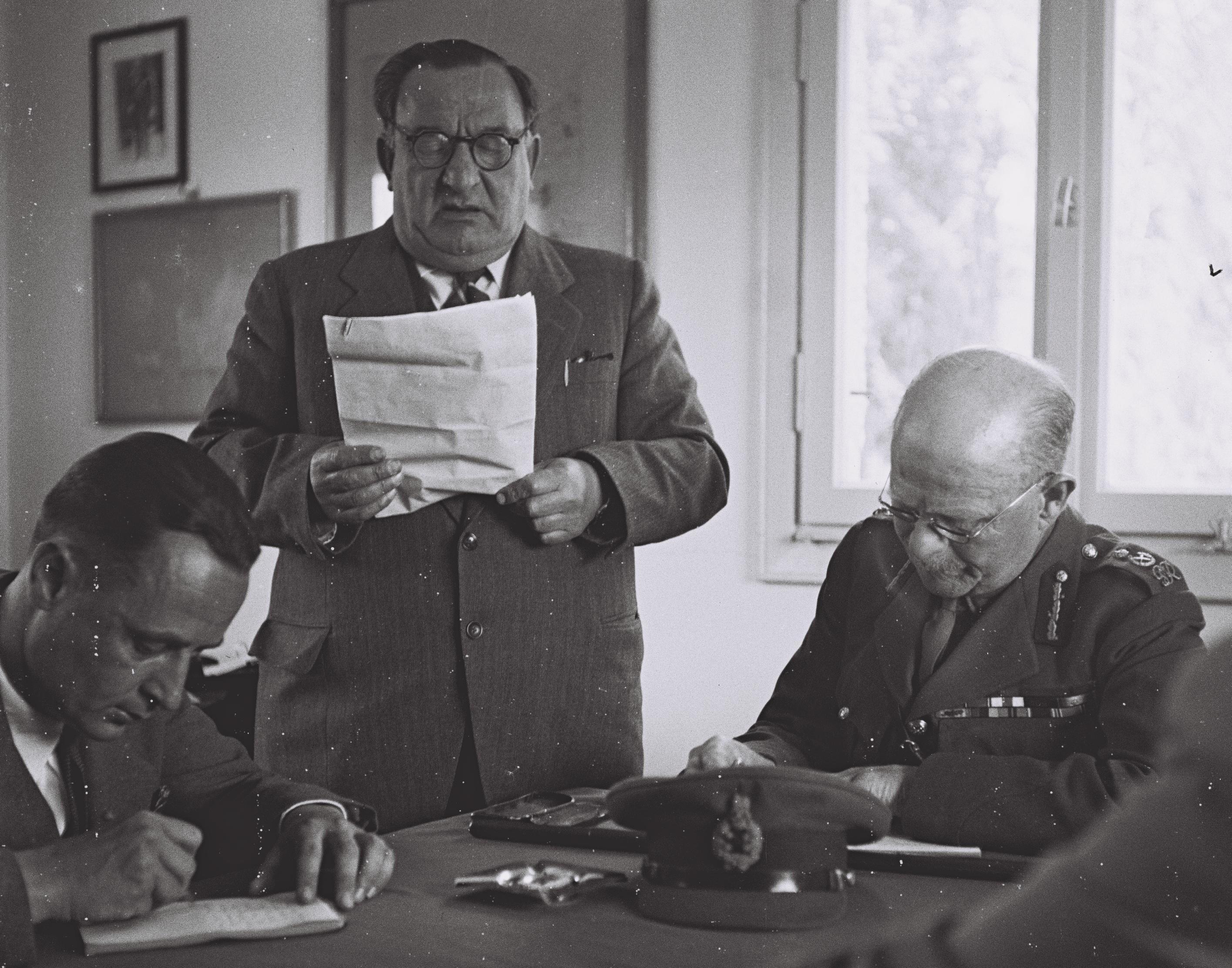
Avraham Krinitzi with High Commissioner Lord Gort, April 1945

In 1926, the Mandatory Palestine government granted Ramat Gan the status of a local council, and Krinitzi became its first Head. Between 1926 and his death in 1969 he won twelve consecutive elections, and his term in office of 43 years (24 years as the Head of the Council and another 19 years as mayor) is thought to be a world record. During his term in offices, he oversaw a succession of coalitions between right-wing and centrist parties.

== Commemoration ==
In his will, written in June 1966, he left his home to the municipality to be used for public and cultural purposes. Today the house as a museum and archive the history of Ramat Gan with experiential training activities conducted for tourists and school students.

Political offices
| New title | Mayor of Ramat Gan; 1926–1969 | Succeeded by Yisrael Peled |
