= Zvi Bar =

Israeli politician

Zvi Bar צבי בר
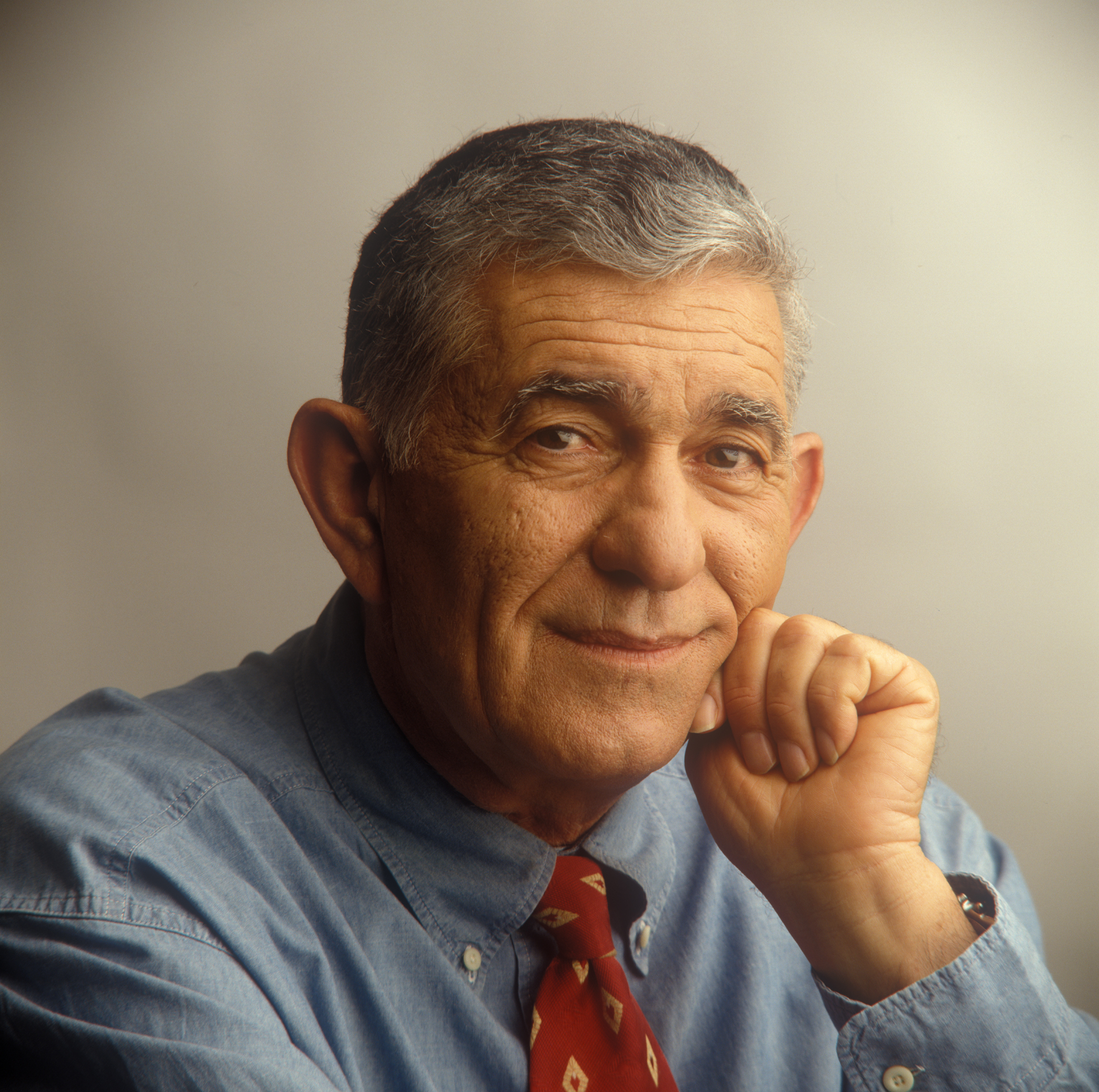

4th Mayor of Ramat Gan
- In office February 28, 1989 – December 22, 2013
- Preceded by: Uri Amit
- Succeeded by: Yisrael Zinger

Personal details
- Born: October 8, 1935 (age 90) Kfar Yona, Mandatory Palestine
- Party: Likud

Military service
- Allegiance: Israel
- Branch/service: Paratroopers Brigade
- Years of service: 1953–1987
- Rank: Tat Aluf
- Unit: Battalion 202
- Battles/wars: Six-Day War, Yom Kippur War

Zvi Bar (Hebrew: צבי בר; born October 8, 1935, in Kfar Yona) is a retired Israeli military officer, police official, and politician. After serving in a variety of military and police command positions, Bar served as the fourth mayor of the Israeli city of Ramat Gan between 1989 and 2013.

== Biography ==
Bar was born in Kfar Yona during the Mandate era to parents of Kurdish Jewish origin. His father changed the family name from Barazani to Bar at the recommendation of David Ben-Gurion. Bar studied at the Tcherniovsky high school in Netanya. In 1954, Bar joined the Israel Defense Forces as a combat soldier in the Givati Brigade, and became an officer. Following the Suez Crisis, he joined the Paratroopers Brigade. After Yoav Shaham, the commander of Battalion 202 of the Paratroopers Brigade was killed in action during the Samu Incident in 1966, Bar was appointed to replace him.

Bar fought as the commander of Paratrooper Battalion 202 during the Six-Day War, participating in combat operations in Gaza City. In 1968, he participated in the Battle of Karameh. He later served as the deputy commander of the 275th brigade and as commander of the ID school of officer training. In October 1973, one day before the Yom Kippur War broke out, he was appointed commander of the 820th Brigade, which was positioned on the Golan Heights, and commanded that brigade through the war. He later testified before the Agranat Commission, an Israeli government investigation of failures that occurred during that war. He was then transferred to the Armored Corps and commanded the 166th Brigade, which was based in northern Israel.

Bar attended staff college in Israel and France, and completed a BA in political science from Bar-Ilan University in 1976. After completing his degree, he joined the Israel Police, and was appointed deputy commander of the Border Police. In January 1977, he was promoted to the rank of Major. In 1983 he was appointed head of the police operations department and served in this position until 1985.

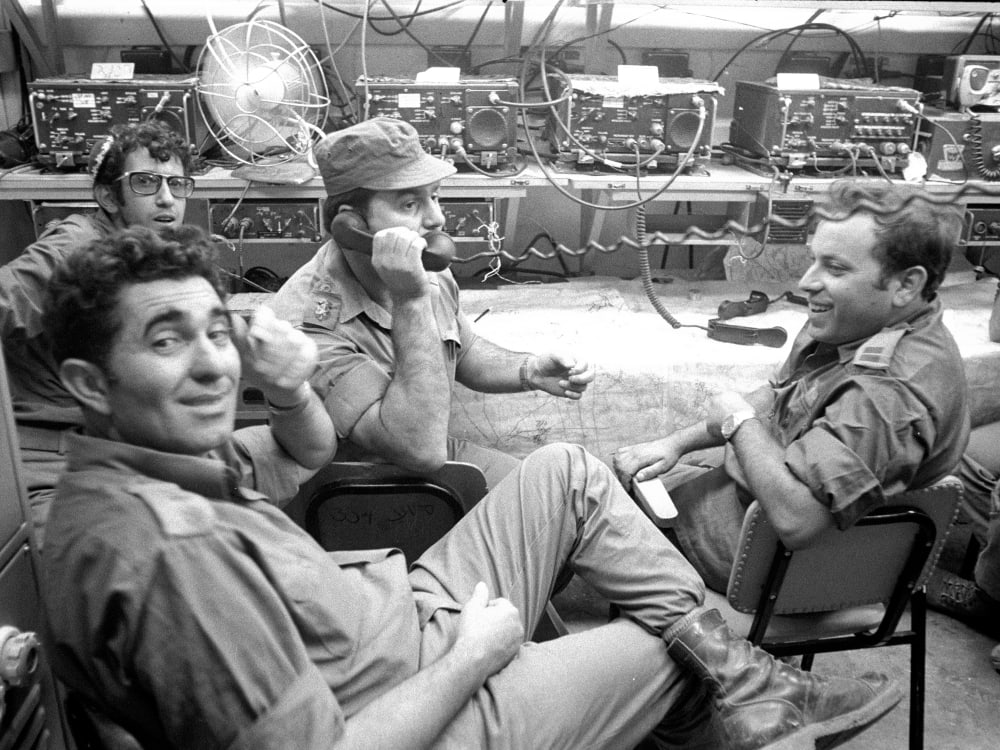
Zvi Bar (left) during Yom Kippur War

=== Political career ===
Bar was elected mayor of Ramat Gan in 1989. He came to the Israeli public's attention, and garnered approval and support, because of his leadership and morale-building when Ramat Gan was subjected to Iraqi Scud missiles during the Desert Storm operation. Bar was re-elected as in four consecutive elections – in 1993, 1998, 2003, and 2008. His fourth term ended in 2013.

== Corruption case ==
In 2004, Bar was questioned by police on allegations that he and mayor of neighboring Tel Aviv Ron Huldai engaged in corruption. In April 2011 the Ministry of Justice decided to indict Bar, along with five other real estate developers, for bribery and money laundering. In June 2015, Bar was sentenced to 5.5 years in prison. After an appeal of the verdict, his sentence was reduced to three years by the Israeli Supreme Court. Bar began serving his sentence at Maasiyahu Prison on February 1, 2017. President Reuven Rivlin subsequently commuted it to 15 months. In November 2017 he was released on parole after having served 10 months of his sentence.

== Personal life ==
Zvi Bar is married to Riva, with whom he has three children.

== See also ==
- List of Israeli public officials convicted of crimes or misdemeanors

Political offices
Preceded by Uri Amit	Mayor of Ramat Gan; 1989–2013	Succeeded by Yisrael Zinger
