= Ramat Gan =

City in Israel

Ramat Gan רָמַת גַּן
- City (from 1950)

Hebrew transcription(s)
  - Also spelled: Ramat-Gan
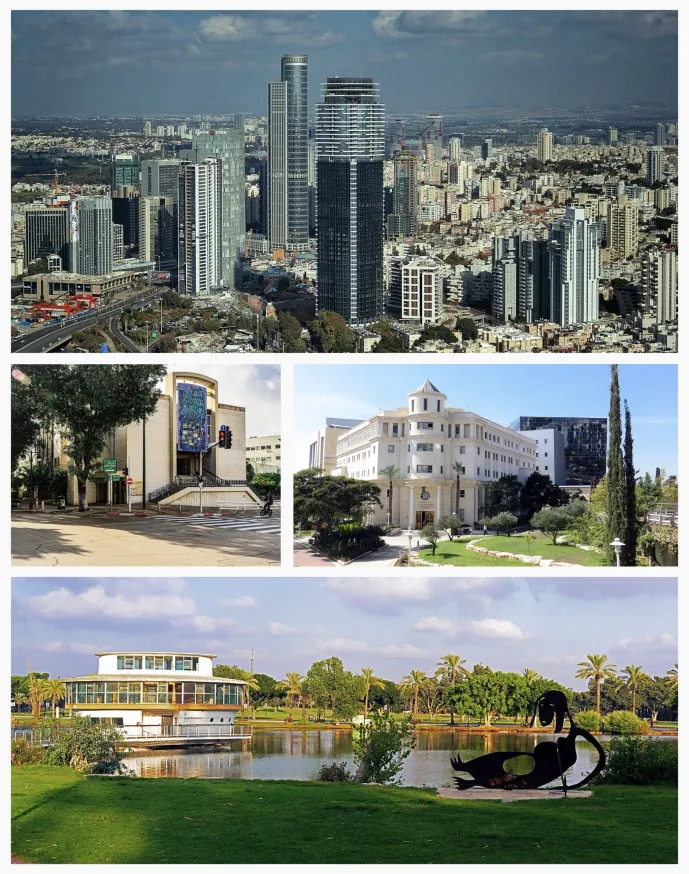
- View of the Diamond Exchange District from the Azrieli Center, As well with Bar-Ilan University with the Ramat Gan Great Synagogue on the left with the Ramat Gan National Park Below

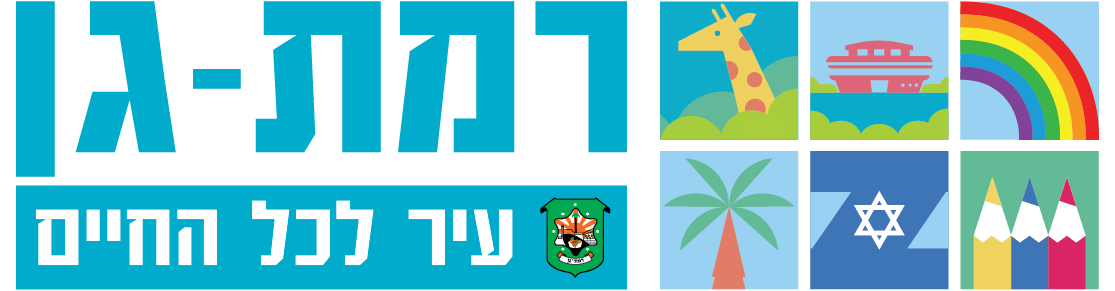
- Flag Coat of arms City Emblem

- Location within Central Israel Location within Israel
- Coordinates: 32°04′12″N 34°49′25″E
- Country: Israel
- District: Tel Aviv
- Natural Region: Ramat Gan
- Founded: 1921

Government
  - Mayor: Carmel Shama

Area
  - Total: 12,214 dunams (12.214 km^{2}; 4.716 sq mi)

Population (2024)
  - Total: 172,242
  - Density: 14,102/km^{2} (36,524/sq mi)

Ethnicity
  - Jews and others: 99.3%
  - Arabs: 0.7%
- Name meaning: Garden Heights
- Website: www.ramat-gan.muni.il

Ramat Gan (Hebrew: רָמַת גַּן, lit. 'Height of Garden', pronounced [raˈmat ˈɡan]) is a city in the Tel Aviv District of Israel, located east of the municipality of Tel Aviv, and is part of the Gush Dan metropolitan area. It is home to a Diamond Exchange District (one of the world's major diamond exchanges), Sheba Medical Center (the largest hospital in Israel) and many high-tech industries.

Ramat Gan was established in 1921 as a moshava, a communal farming settlement. In 2024 it had a population of 172,242.

== History ==
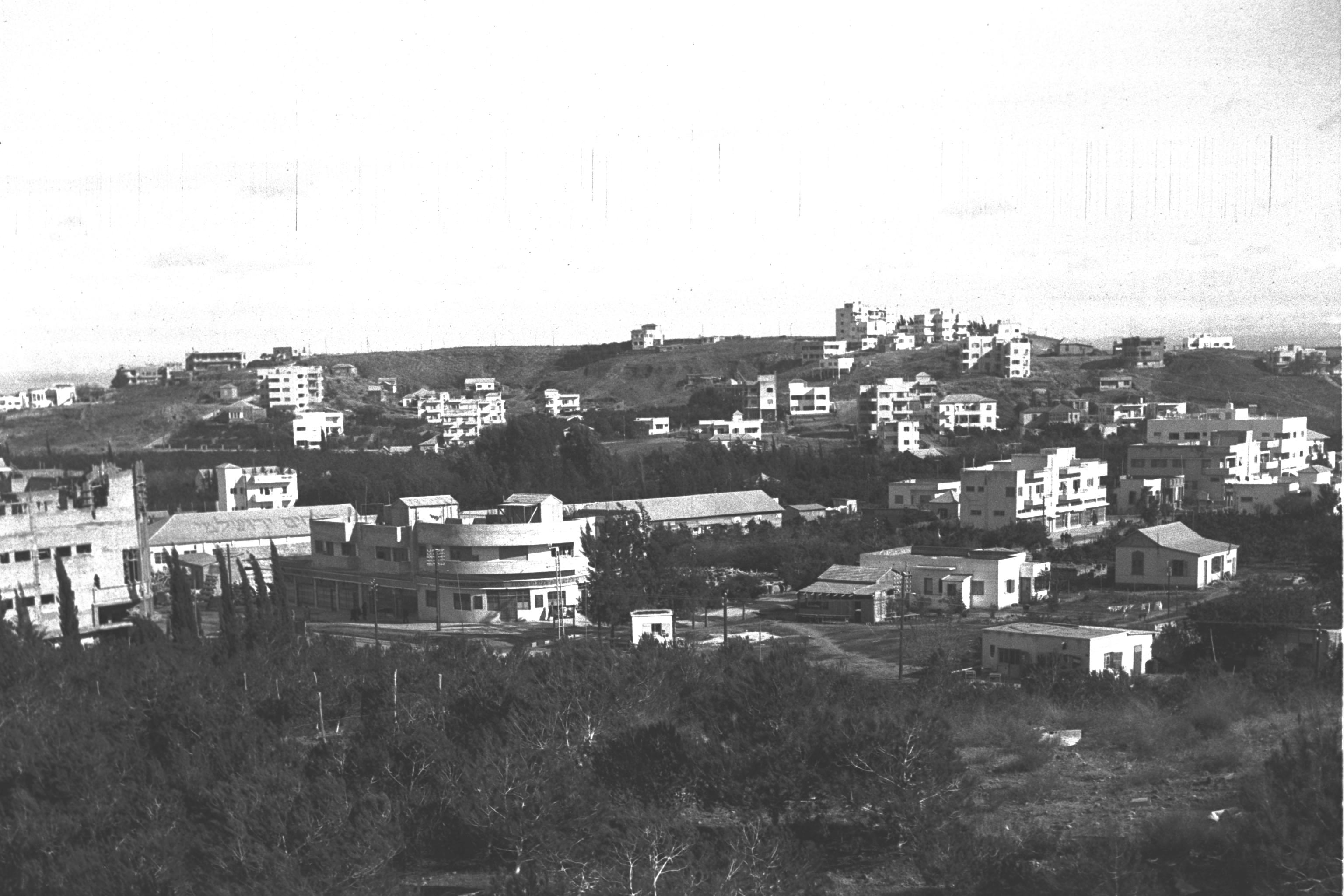
Ramat Gan in 1936

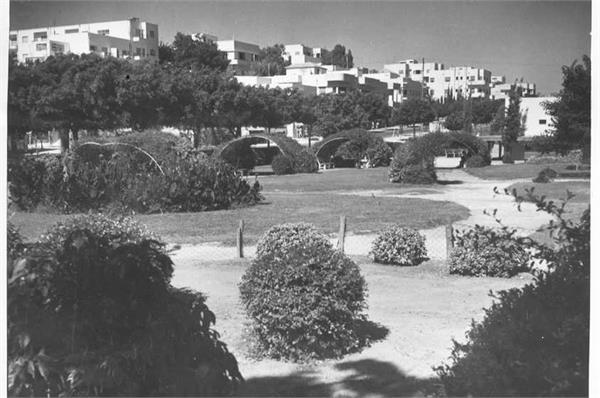
Ramat Gan in 1945

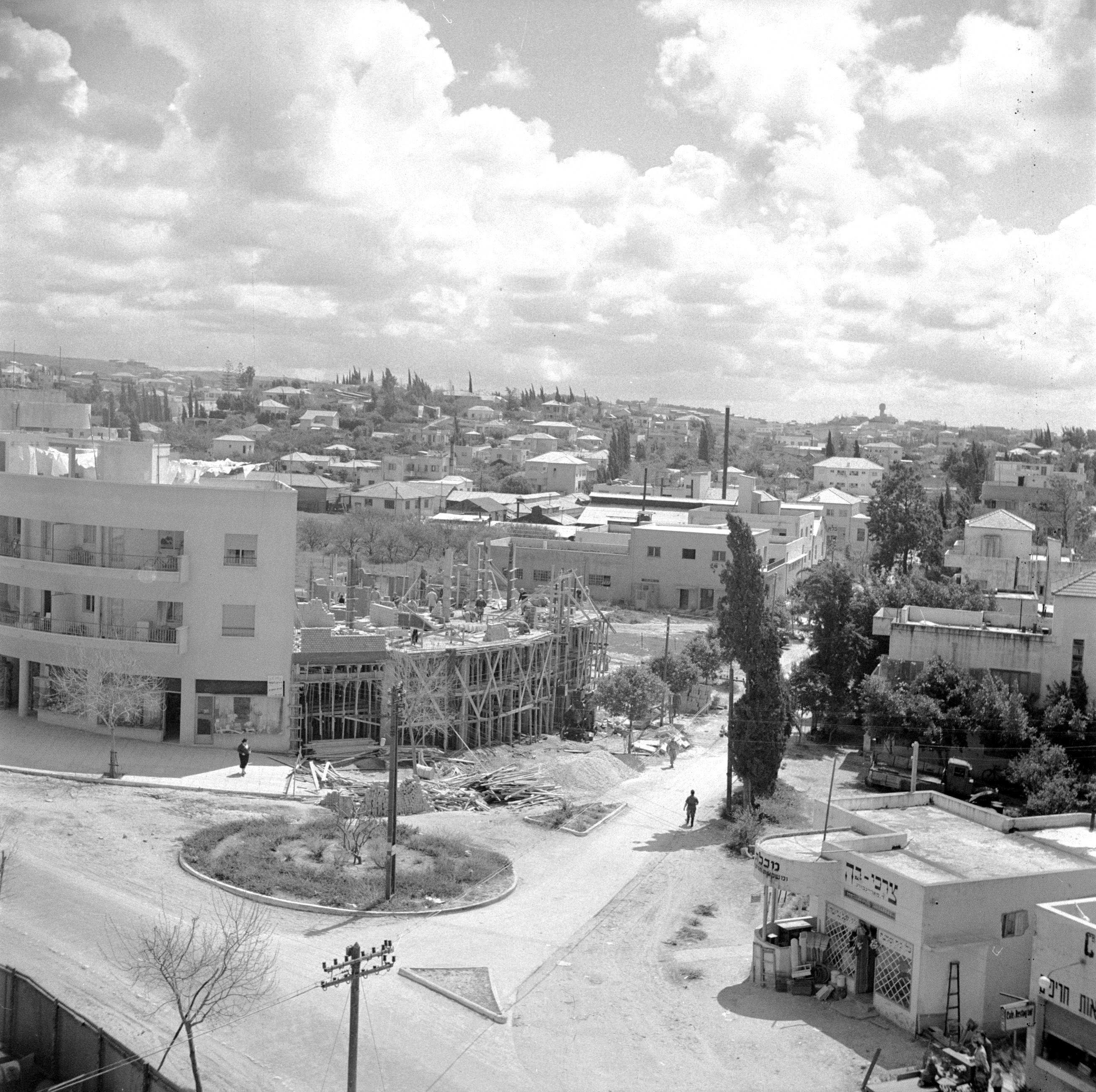
Ramat Gan in 1948

Ramat Gan was established by the Ir Ganim association in 1921 as a satellite town of Tel Aviv. The first plots of land were purchased between 1914 and 1918. It stood just south of the Arab village of Jarisha. The settlement was initially a moshava, a Zionist agricultural colony that grew wheat, barley and watermelons. The name of the settlement was changed to Ramat Gan (lit: Garden Height) in 1923. The settlement continued to operate as a moshava until 1933, although it achieved local council status in 1926. At this time it had 450 residents. In the 1940s, Ramat Gan became a battleground in the country's language war: A Yiddish language printing press in Ramat Gan was blown up by Hebrew-language extremists.

Over the years, the economy shifted from agriculture to commerce and industry. By 1946, the population had grown to 12,000. In 1950, Ramat Gan was recognized as a city. The city's population was greatly boosted by an influx of Iraqi Jews into Israel during Operation Ezra and Nehemiah. So many Iraqi immigrants settled in Ramat Gan that it became known as "Little Baghdad." The popular Israeli dish Sabich, based on a traditional Iraqi Jewish meal, was created in Ramat Gan by Iraqi immigrants. In 1955, it had a population of 55,000. The first mayor was Avraham Krinitzi who remained in office for 43 years. In 1961, the municipal area of Ramat Gan expanded eastward, to encompass the area that includes the Sheba Medical Center in Tel Hashomer and Bar Ilan University. In 1968, the world's largest diamond exchange opened in Ramat Gan. The Sheba Medical Center and the Israel Diamond Exchange are located in Ramat Gan.

In June 2025, during the Twelve-Day War, the city was targeted by Iran. On 14 June, a ballistic missile struck a residential building, killing a woman. Nine buildings were destroyed, while hundreds of others were damaged at some level; approximately 100 residents were displaced from their homes due to the bombardment. On 19 June, 22 people were injured due to a hit on the financial district with considerable material damage, with two of them seriously wounded.

On 17 March, during the 2026 Iran War, a cluster munition from the warhead of an Iranian missile hit an apartment building killed two residents in their 70s, who were found just outside their safe room. A statement from the Islamic Revolutionary Guard Corps called the barrage that killed the two civilians "revenge for the blood of martyr Dr. Ali Larijani and his companions," who had been killed a day before as the target of an Israeli airstrike.

== Geography and climate ==
Ramat Gan is located in the Gush Dan metropolitan area east of Tel Aviv. It is bounded in the north by the Yarkon River and in the east by Bnei Brak. Giv'atayim lies to the southwest.

Ramat Gan experiences an average of 560 mm (22 in) of rainfall per year and is located, on average 80 m (260 ft) above sea level. It is built on limestone hills. Ramat Gan parks include The National Park (Park Leumi) which covers some 1,900 dunams, and David Park in the Merom Naveh neighborhood. 25% of Ramat Gan is covered by public parkland.

Ramat Gan neighborhoods include: Shchunat Hageffen, City Center, Nachalat Ganim, Kiryat Krinitzi, Ramat Shikma, Ramat Yitzhak, Shchunat Rishonim, Tel Yehuda, Givat Geula, Neve Yehoshua, Kiryat Borochov, Merom Naveh, Ramat Amidar, Ramat Chen, Shikun Vatikim, Shchunat Hillel, Elite and Diamond Exchange District and Tel Binyamin.

== Demographics ==
City of Ramat Gan; Population by year
| 1926 | 450 |
| 1931 | 975 |
| 1948 | 17,200 |
| 1955 | 58,500 |
| 1961 | 90,800 |
| 1972 | 118,000 |
| 1983 | 117,100 |
| 2003 | 126,547 |
| 2013 | 149,594 |
| 2023 | 167,794 |

According to the 1931 census, Ramat Gan had 975 inhabitants, in 253 houses. As of 2006, Ramat Gan had 129,700 residents, in an area of 12,000 dunams (12 km^{2}). The population was growing at a rate of 1.0% per annum with 90% of this growth coming through natural increase. The population density of the city is 9,822.6 per square kilometer, one of the highest in Israel. In terms of the origin of Ramat Gan's residents, 42,900 originate from Europe and America, 10,200 from Africa, 29,200 from Asia, and 40,600 from Israel. 86,200 of the residents of Ramat Gan were born in Israel, whilst 36,600 were born abroad.

According to the Israel Central Bureau of Statistics, as of 2001, Ramat Gan's socioeconomic ranking stood at 8 out of 10. 70.9% of twelfth grade students received a matriculation certificate in 2000. That year, the average wages in Ramat Gan were 6,995 NIS. As of 2006, 32,100 of the city's households had people who were not in the labour force, with 23,300 of these retired. 1,900 of the households had unemployed household members. 43,000 households were fully employed. The largest sectors of jobs for those employed in Ramat Gan were business activities, which accounted for 18.1% of jobs; education (15.1%); wholesale and retail trade and repairs (14.2%); manufacturing (10.8%); and health, welfare, and social work services (10.0%).

== Economy ==
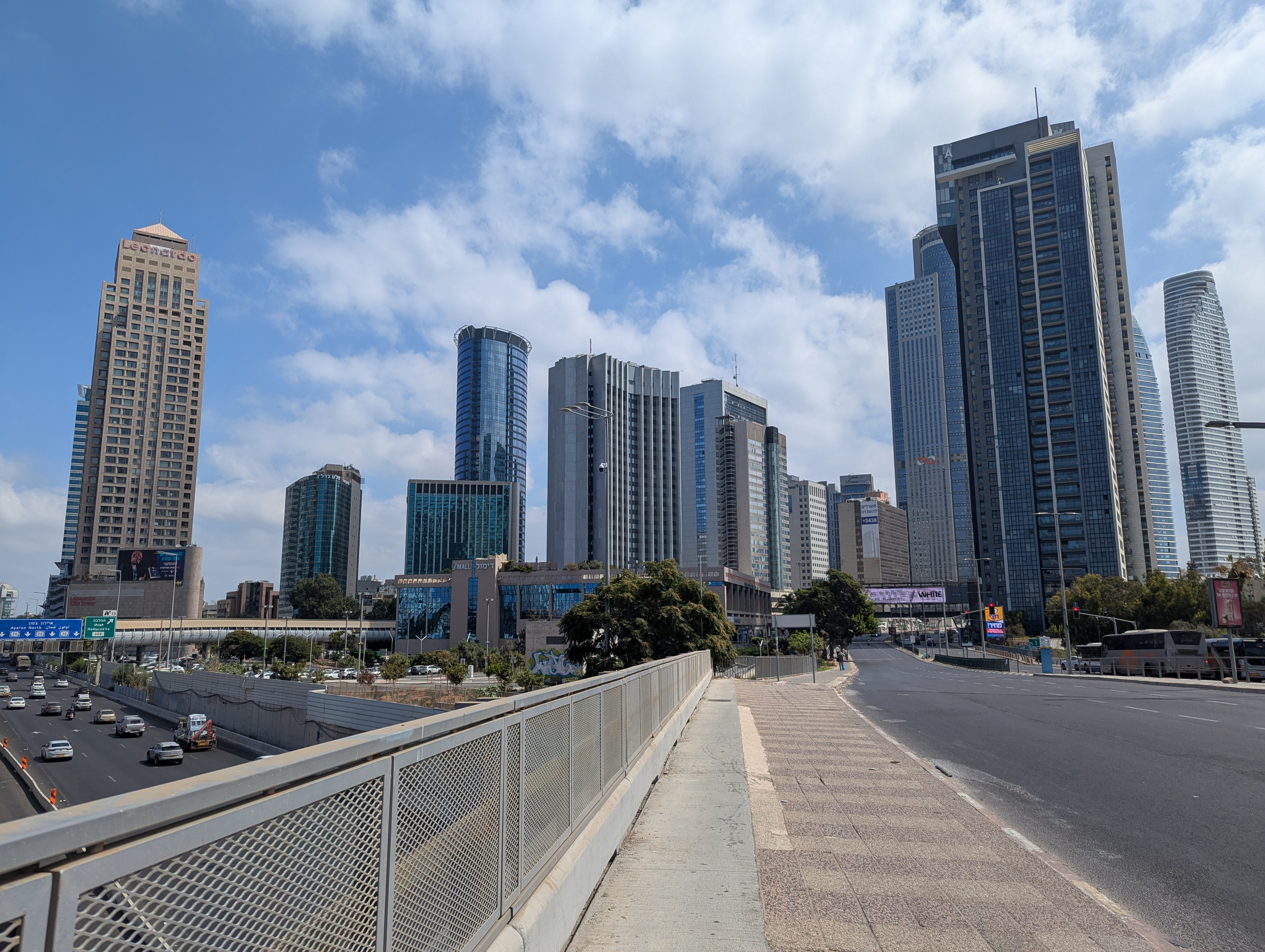
Diamond Exchange District also known as "The Bursa Area" of Ramat Gan

Ramat Gan's economy is dominated by the Diamond Exchange District in the northwest of the city, home to a large concentration of skyscrapers, including Moshe Aviv Tower (also known as City Gate), Israel's second tallest building at 235 metres (771 ft), the Israel Diamond Exchange (a world leader in diamonds), a large Sheraton hotel, and many high-tech businesses, among them Mobileye, Mazebolt and ArticlesBase.

Also located in the Diamond Exchange District is the State Bank of India's Israeli headquarters and the headquarters of Bank Mizrachi, whilst the embassies of Ghana, Kenya, Ivory Coast, Jordan, Eritrea, Norway, Belgium, the Netherlands, and the European Economic Community, are located in the area. Several other international embassies are also located in the city, as is the British Council. Also headquartered in the city is the Histadrut trade union. Located to the south of Ramat Gan is Hiriya, the largest waste transfer site in the Middle East.

Ramat Gan is also an important center for industry and manufacturing with major fruit and vegetable canning plants, textile mills, metal production plants, electrical manufacturers, furniture makers, and food producers based there. Currently, the Elite Tower, set to exceed the Moshe Aviv Tower in height, is being built on the site of the historic Elite Candy factory. As a tribute to the history of the site, the lower floors of the tower will house a chocolate museum. At the end of 2006, Ramat Gan had three hotels, with a total of 408 rooms and 150,000 person-nights over the course of the year, which represented a 64% room occupancy rate.

== Local government ==
The mayor of Ramat Gan is Carmel Shama.

Below is a complete list of mayors:

Mayors of Ramat Gan
| Mayor | | Party | Took office | Left office |
|---|---|---|---|---|
| 1 | Avraham Krinitzi | General Zionists | 1926 | 1969 |
| 2 | Yisrael Peled | General Zionists | 1969 | 1983 |
| 3 | Uri Amit | Labor | 1983 | 1989 |
| 4 | Zvi Bar | Likud | 1989 | 2013 |
| 5 | Yisrael Zinger | Zinger LeRamat Gan | 2013 | 2018 |
| 6 | Carmel Shama | New Hope (Israel) | 2018 | Present |

== Education ==
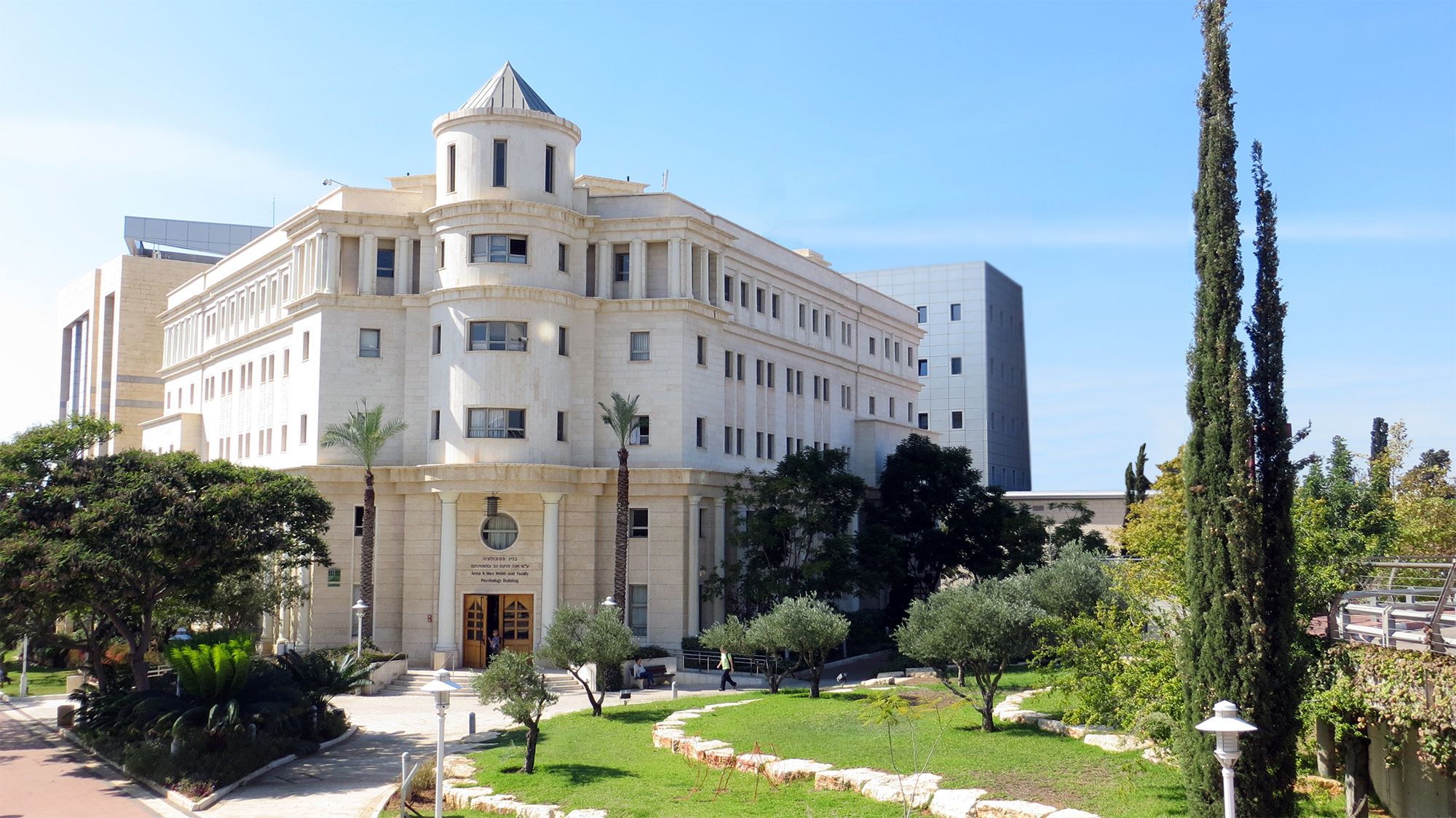
Bar-Ilan University

Ramat Gan is home to Israel's second largest university, Bar-Ilan University, with 24,000 students. The city is also the location of the Shenkar College of Engineering and Design, Ramat Gan College, the College of Law and Business, Beit Zvi acting college. Ramat Gan is home to the Israel Bible Center as well.

== Religions ==
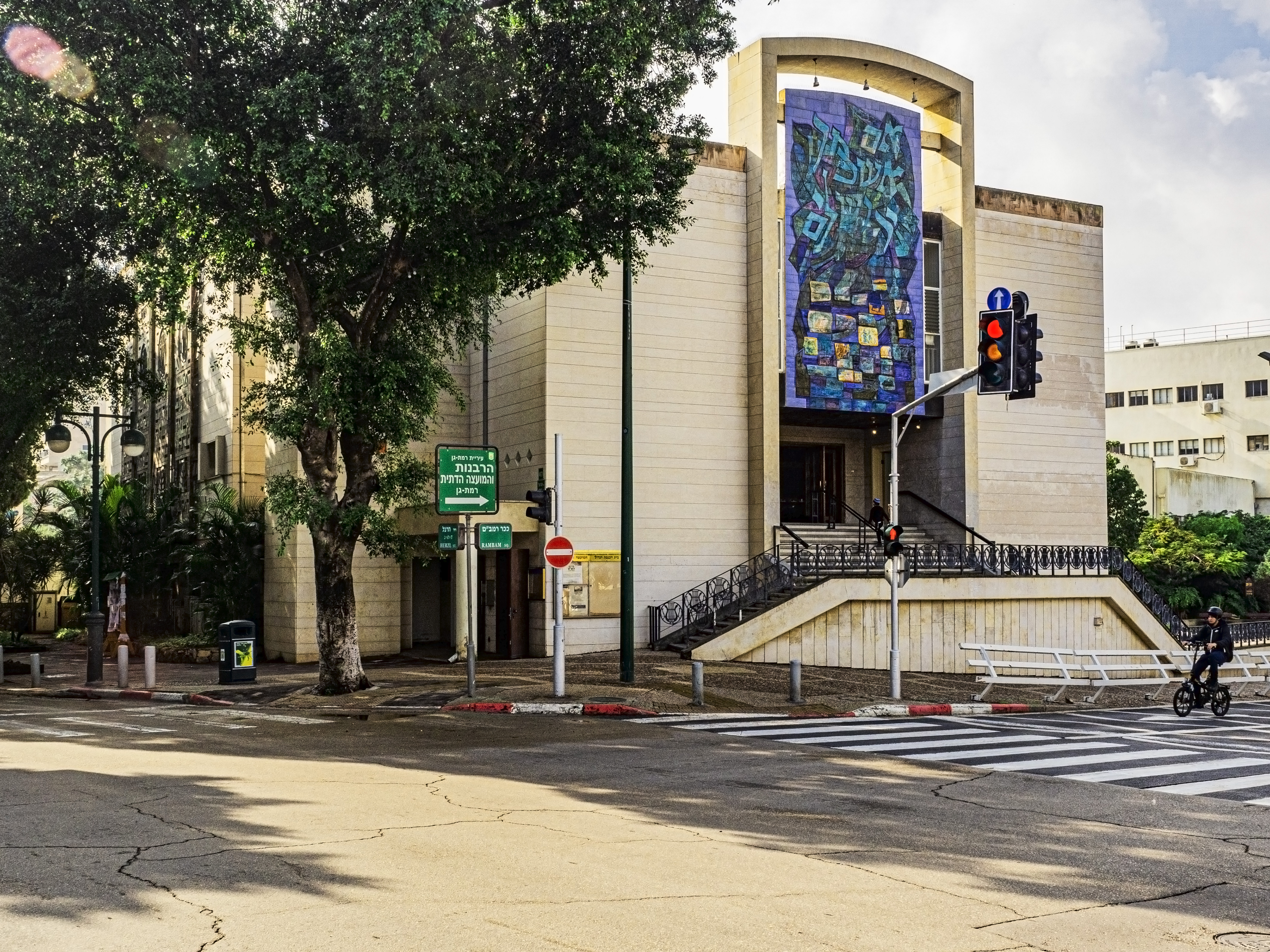
Ramat-Gan Great Synagogue

=== Judaism ===
Ramat Gan has 112 synagogues, two yeshivot, and a Kabbalah Center.

=== Other ===
Ramat Gan also has a Buddhist temple and a Scientology center.

== Healthcare ==
The Sheba Medical Center, located in southeastern Ramat Gan and Tel HaShomer, is Israel's largest hospital. It includes the Safra Children's Hospital and Padeh Geriatric Rehabilitation Center. The city has 32 medical centers run by health authorities and 10 child-care clinics operated by the municipality. The city is also served by Mayanei Hayeshua Medical Center, a Haredi hospital in nearby Bnei Brak.

== Archaeology ==
Northwest of the city is the archaeological site of Tel Gerisa, with its main occupation phases dating back to the Middle and Late Bronze Ages and declining through Iron Age I and II.

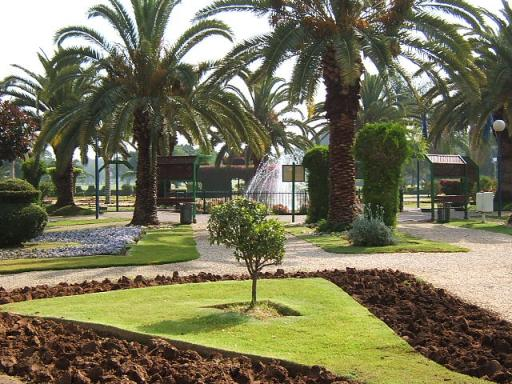
Ramat Gan National Park

In 2026, a 1,300-year-old industrial and commercial complex was discovered in the parking lot of the Winter Stadium, revealing ancient streets, pottery kilns, and industrial buildings. The Israel Antiquities Authority stated that the site dates to the Umayyad, Abbasid, and Fatimid periods, and proposed that it could have served as a major trade and industrial station or been part of a nearby undiscovered settlement.

== Culture ==
Cultural venues in Ramat Gan include the Ramat Gan Theater, the Diamond Theater and the Russell Cultural Center. The Beit Zvi School of Performing Arts is based in Ramat Gan. Ramat Gan operates two cinema complexes: the Lev-Elram Cinema and the "Yes Planet" megaplex. Ramat Gan also has a safari park. The 250-acre site consists of both a drive-through African safari area and a modern outdoor zoo.

=== Museums ===
Ramat Gan Museum of Israeli Art

Beit Avraham Krinitzi, home of the first mayor, is now a museum of the history of Ramat Gan. Man and the Living World Museum is a natural history museum and the Maccabi Museum is a museum which focuses on the history of Jewish sports since 1898. The Ramat Gan Safari, a 250-acre (1.0 km^{2}) zoo housing 1,600 animals, is the largest animal collection in the Middle East. Other museums in the city include the Museum of Israeli Art, Kiryat Omanut, which houses sculpture galleries and a ceramics studio, the Museum of Russian Art, the Museum of Jewish Art, and the Yehiel Nahari Museum of Far Eastern Art. The Ramat Gan Museum of Israeli Art hosts artworks by several Israeli artists including Arie Aroch, Yitzhak Frenkel, Yehezkel Streichman and others.

== Sports ==
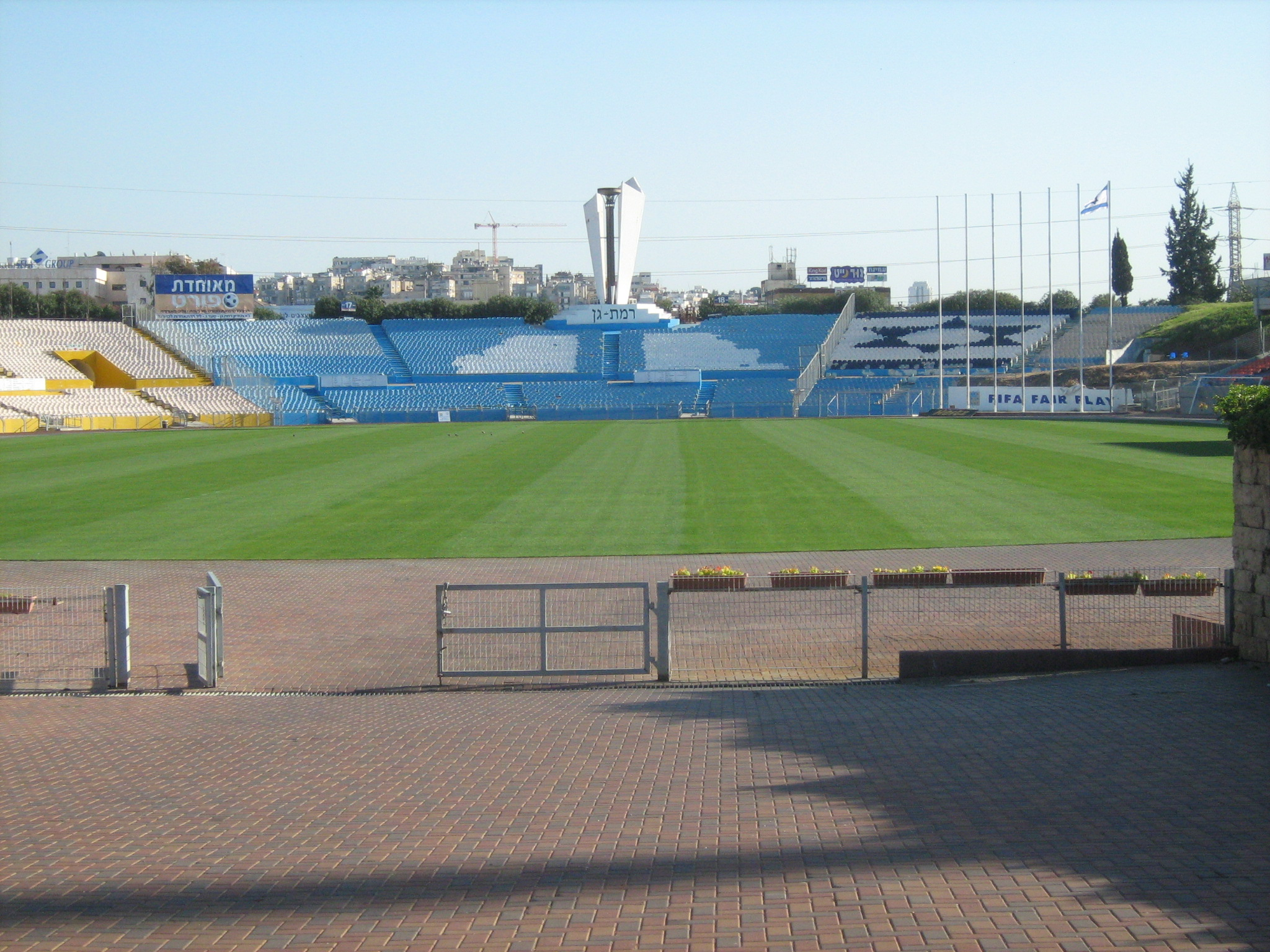
Ramat Gan Stadium

The Maccabiah Games are held in Ramat Gan every four years. Ramat Gan Stadium was Israel's national football stadium until 2014. The stadium can seat up to 41,583 in practice (the official capacity is 13,370 seats). Hakoah Amidar Ramat Gan and Hapoel Ramat Gan, who both play at the Winter Stadium, are the city's main football clubs, both having won the championship at some point in their history. Beitar Ramat Gan plays in the South A Division of Liga Bet (fourth tier league), whilst F.C. Mahanaim Ramat Gan, Maccabi Hashikma Hen, Maccabi Spartak Ramat Gan, and Shikun Vatikim Ramat Gan are all playing in the Tel Aviv Division of Liga Gimel (fifth tier league). The now-defunct clubs Maccabi Ramat Gan and Maccabi Ramat Amidar were both involved in mergers which formed Hakoah Amidar. In basketball, Ironi Ramat Gan plays in Ligat HaAl, the top division.

== Voting Patterns ==
In the 2022 election, 62 percent of voters in Ramat Gan voted for the parties of the center-left coalition led by Yair Lapid, while 34 percent voted for the parties of the right-wing coalition led by Benjamin Netanyahu and 0.5 percent voted for the Arab parties.

In the 2026 election, 67 percent of voters in Ramat Gan voted for the parties of the center-left coalition led by Gadi Eisenkot, while 27 percent voted for the parties of the right-wing coalition led by Benjamin Netanyahu and 0.6 percent voted for the Arab parties. An additional 3.5 percent voted for the Reservists, and 1.8 percent voted for Amcha Yisrael. Voter turnout increased 18 percent from the 2022 election.

== Notable people ==
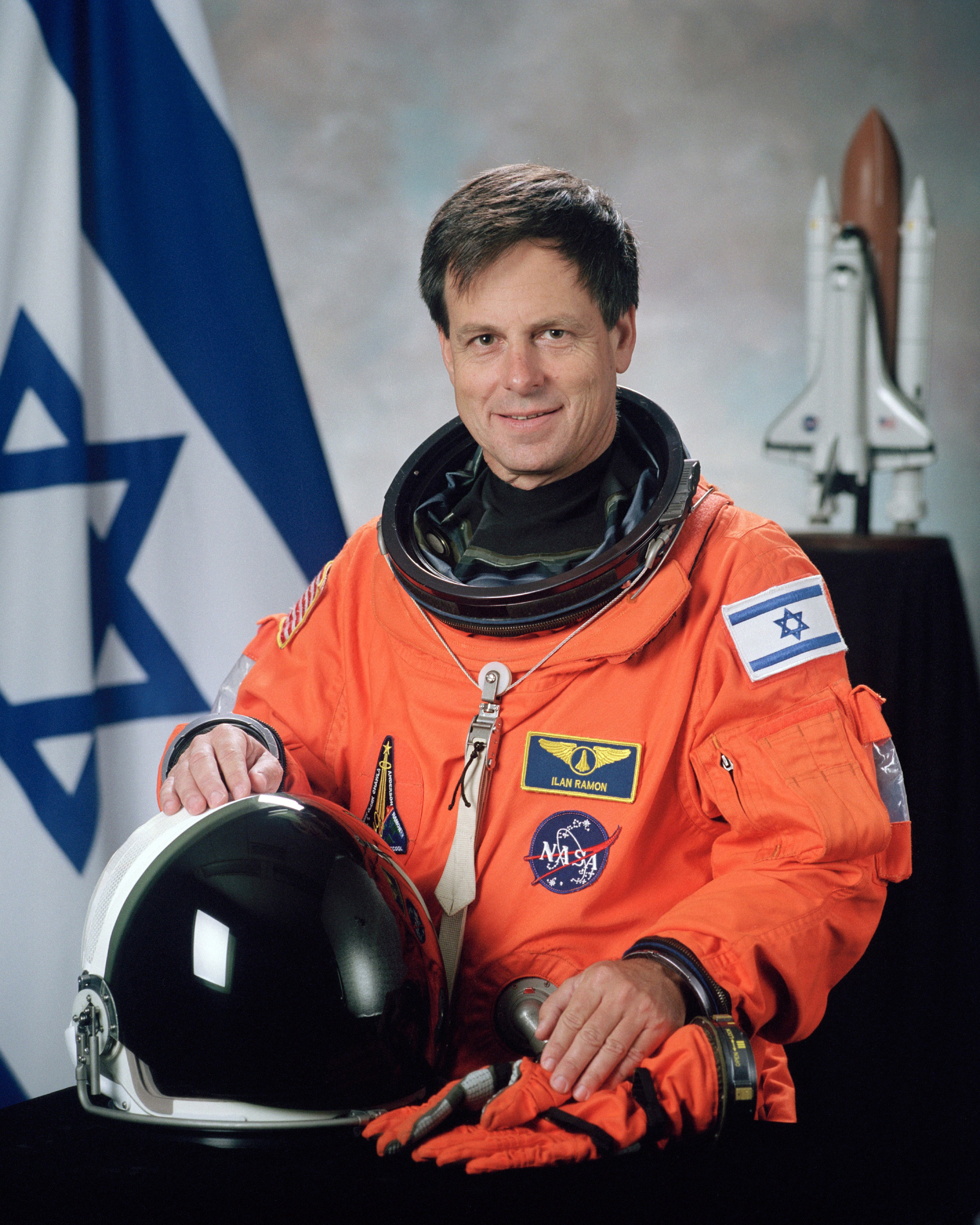
Ilan Ramon, first Israeli astronaut; killed in Space Shuttle Columbia disaster

- Blessing Afrifah (born 2003), Olympic sprinter
- Avi Arad (born 1948), CEO and founder of Marvel Studios
- Lior Ashkenazi (born 1968), actor
- Gilad Atzmon (born 1963), jazz saxophonist
- Ehud Banai (born 1953), singer and songwriter
- Yoram Ben-Porat (1937–1992), economist and president of the Hebrew University of Jerusalem
- Moshe Bromberg (1920–1982), a.k.a. Moshe Bar-Am; painter, artist
- Danny Danon (born 1971), politician
- Shai Davidai, assistant professor at Columbia Business School, advocate against antisemitism
- Lior Eliyahu (born 1985), basketball player
- Tal Erel (born 1996), Israel National Baseball Team player
- Ofer Fleisher (born 1966), basketball player
- David Frankfurter (1909–1982), executioner in 1936 of Swiss Nazi Party leader Wilhelm Gustloff
- Aviv Geffen (born 1973), musician
- Uzi Hitman (1952–2004), songwriter and singer
- Noam Jacobson (born 1975), musician
- Etgar Keret (born 1967), author
- James Kugel (born 1945), biblical scholar
- Amichai Lao-Lavi (born 1969), social entrepreneur, human rights activist and LGBT, conservative rabbi
- Inbar Lavi (born 1986), actress
- Lior Lubin (born 1979), basketball player and coach
- Käthe Ephraim Marcus (1892–1970), German-Israeli painter and sculptor
- Kobi Marimi (born 1991), actor and singer, Israeli representative at Eurovision Song Contest 2019
- Doron Menashe, law professor
- Mikaella Moshe (born 2003), Olympic archer
- Oren Peli (born 1970), film producer
- Vicky Peretz (1953–2021), international footballer
- Daniel Poleshchuk (b. 1996), squash player
- Ilan Ramon (1954–2003), first Israeli astronaut; killed in Space Shuttle Columbia disaster
- Dahlia Ravikovitch (1936–2005), poet
- Tom Reuveny (born 2000), Olympic champion windsurfing sailor
- Ze'ev Revach (born 1940), actor
- Guy Sasson (born 1980), Paralympic wheelchair tennis player
- Gilad Segev (born 1974), singer and songwriter
- Ron Shachar (born 1962), professor and researcher
- Rona-Lee Shimon (born 1983), actress
- Silvan Shalom (born 1958), politician
- Yuval Spungin (born 1987), football player
- Tal Stricker (born 1979), Olympic swimmer
- Maya Arad Yasur (born 1976), playwright
- Michael Zandberg (born 1980), footballer
- Tamar Zandberg (born 1976), politician

== Twin towns – sister cities ==
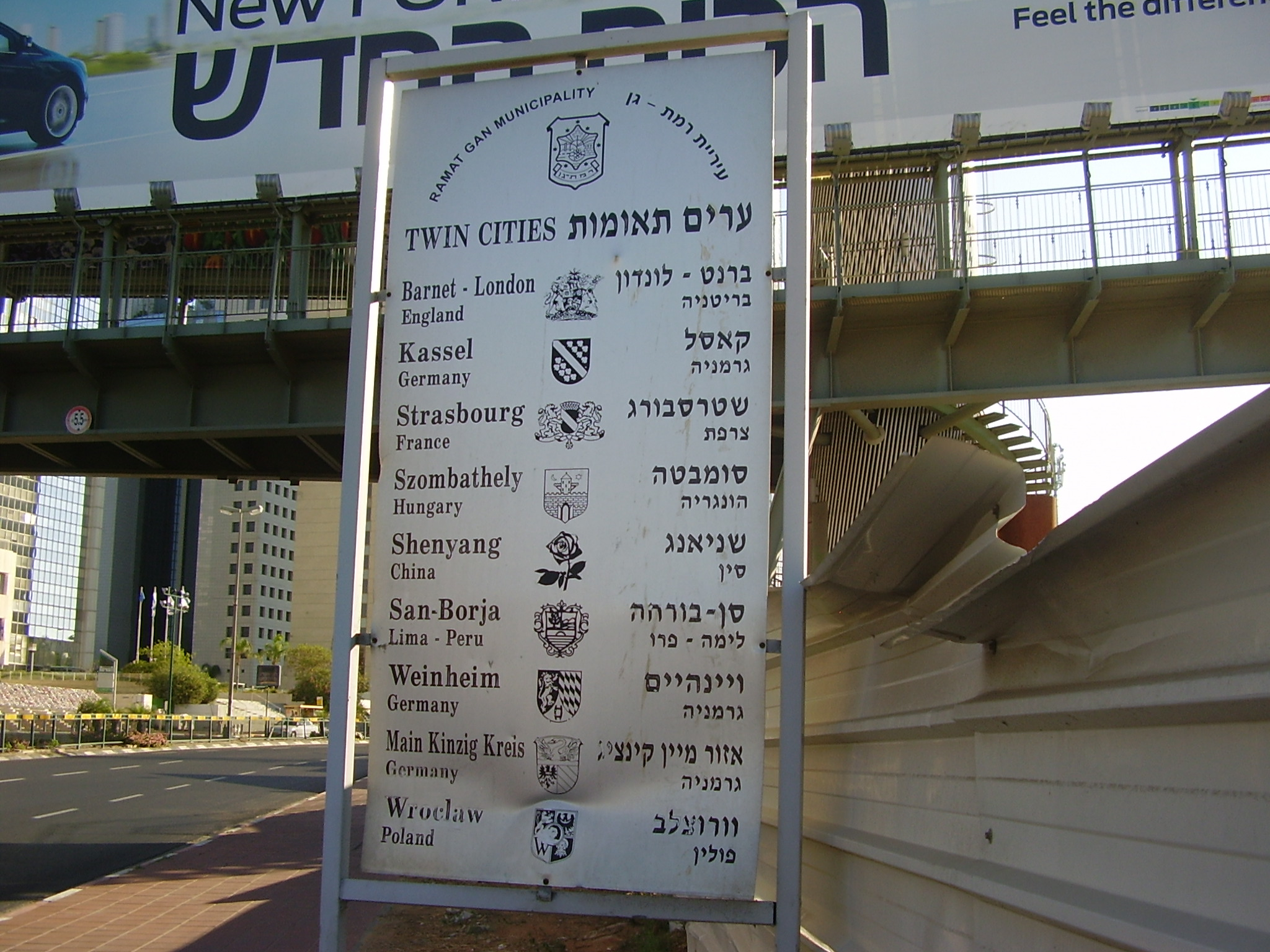
Ramat Gan's twin towns

Ramat Gan is twinned with:

- Barnet, United Kingdom (since 1976)
- Huntington Beach, United States (since 2024)
- Kassel, Germany (since 1990)
- Main-Kinzig District, Germany (since 2000)
- Penza, Russia (since 2007)
- Phoenix, United States (since 2005)
- Qingdao, China (since 2012)
- Rio de Janeiro, Brazil (since 2011)
- San Borja, Peru (since 2014)
- Shenyang, China (since 1993)
- Strasbourg, France (since 1991)
- Szombathely, Hungary (since 1995)
- Taoyuan, Taiwan (since 2016)
- Weinheim, Germany (since 1999)
- Wrocław, Poland (since 1997)
