= Yisrael Peled =

Israeli politician and lawyer

Yisrael Peled ישראל פלד
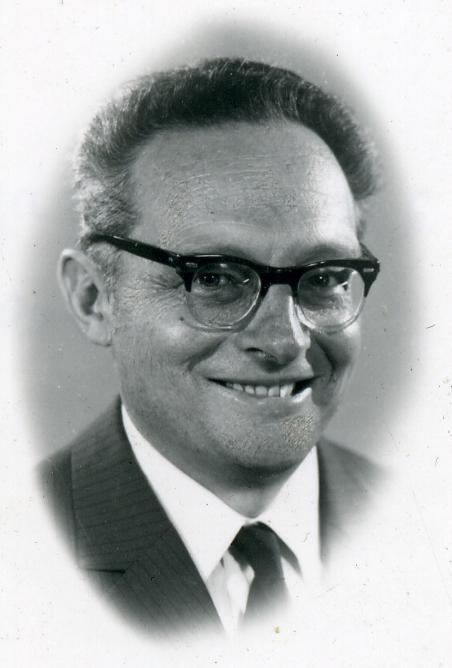

2nd Mayor of Ramat Gan
- In office 1969–1983
- Preceded by: Avraham Krinitzi
- Succeeded by: Uri Amit

Personal details
- Born: October 2, 1921 Tel Aviv, Mandatory Palestine
- Died: July 14, 2016 (aged 94)
- Party: General Zionists

Yisrael Peled (Hebrew: ישראל פלד; born October 2, 1921; died July 14, 2016) was an Israeli politician who served as the second mayor of Ramat Gan between 1969 and 1983.

== Biography ==
Yisrael Feldman (later Peled) was born in Tel Aviv during the Mandate era. He was the grandson of Haim Dov and Rivka Feldman, who were among the founders of Rosh Pinna. After graduating from the Herzliya Hebrew Gymnasium, he studied at the Tel Aviv School of Law and Economics and then received a doctorate in law from the University of Lyon. He served in the Israel Defense Forces in military intelligence during the 1948 Arab-Israeli War. After his military service, he moved to Ramat Gan and worked as a lawyer.

Peled was married to Miriam Haya Rivlin, with whom he had five children.

== Political and public career ==
In 1959 Ramat Gan mayor Avraham Krinitzi asked him to run on the General Zionist list in the city council elections. After the death of Krinitzi in 1969, he was chosen to replace Krinitzi in the mayor's office. He served as mayor of Ramat Gan for three successive terms. Among the projects established and promoted at the time: Safari Ayalon Mall and Diamond Exchange District.

In 1973–1986, Peled served as chairman of the Maccabi World Union, chairman of the organizing committee and chairman of three Maccabiah Games. He was also a member of the World Zionist Organization and the Jewish Agency.

Political offices
Preceded by Avraham Krinitzi	Mayor of Ramat Gan; 1969–1983	Succeeded by Uri Amit
