= Merkava =

Series of Israeli main battle tanks

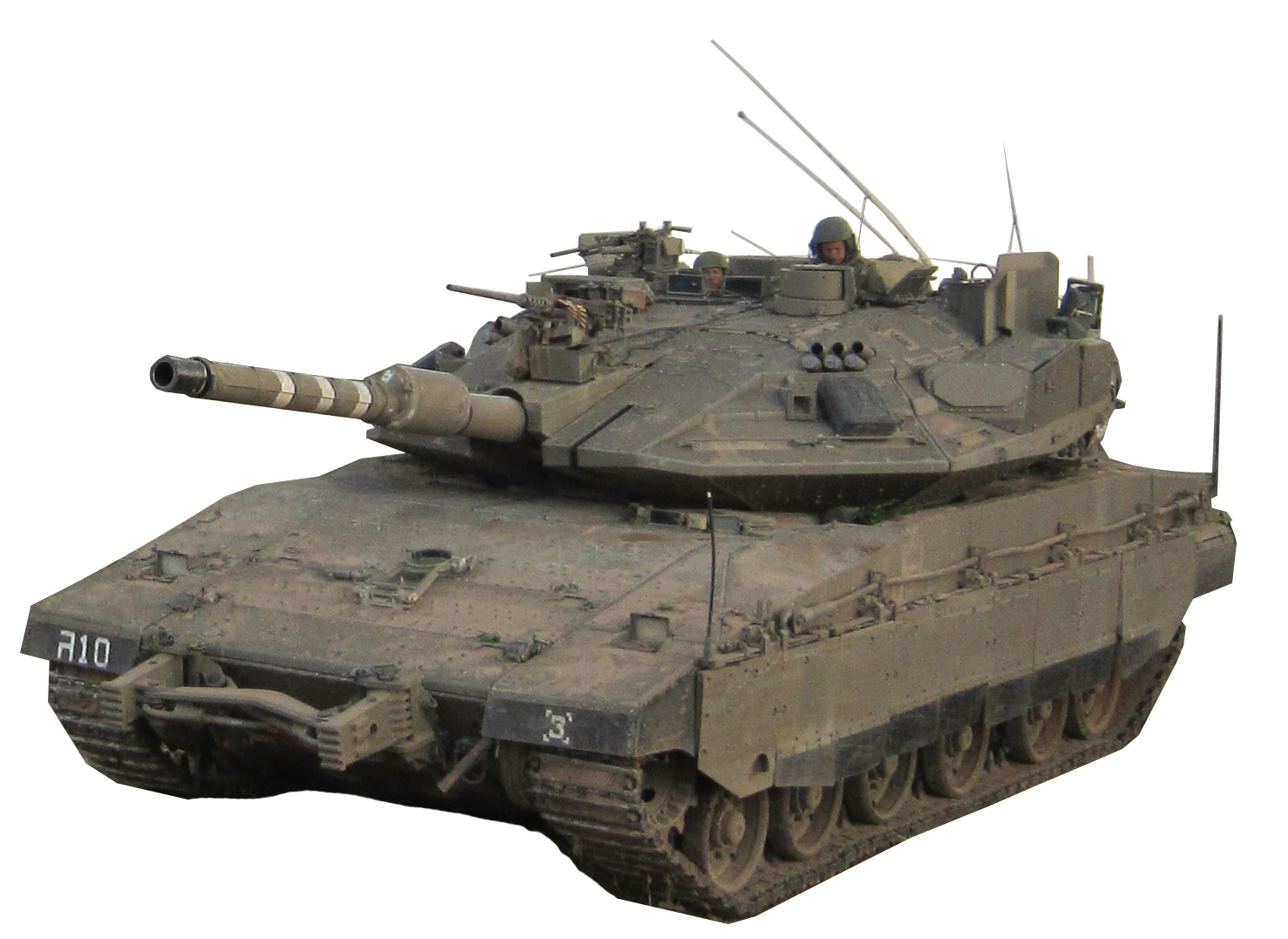
- Merkava Mk 4M Windbreaker, equipped with the Trophy active protection system, during Operation Protective Edge 2014.
- Type: Main battle tank
- Place of origin: Israel

Service history
- In service: 1979–present
- Used by: See Operators
- Wars: 1982 Lebanon War; South Lebanon conflict; First Intifada; Second Intifada; 2006 Lebanon War; Gaza War; Operation Pillar of Defense; Operation Protective Edge; Gaza war

Production history
- Designer: Mantak
- Manufacturer: Mantak, IDF Ordnance Corps (assembly)
- Unit cost: $3.5 million (Merkava IV for delivery to the IDF, FY2003) (c. $5.85 million, FY2023); $10 million (Merkava IV) (2014 price for sales to other countries)
- Produced: 1979–present
- No. built: Mark 1: 250; Mark 2: 580; Mark 3: 780; Mark 4: 360 in service + 300 units being delivered

Specifications
- Mass: 65 tonnes (143000 pounds)
- Length: 9.04 m or 29.7 ft (incl. gun barrel); 7.60 m or 24.9 ft (excl. gun barrel)
- Width: 3.72 m or 12.2 ft (excl. skirts)
- Height: 2.66 m or 8.7 ft (to turret roof)
- Crew: 4 (commander, driver, gunner, and loader)
- Armor: Classified composite/sloped armour modular design.
- Main armament: 120 mm (4.7 in) MG251-LR smoothbore gun, capable of firing LAHAT ATGM
- Secondary armament: 1 × 12.7 mm (0.50 in) MG; 3 × 7.62 mm (0.300 in) MG; 1 × Mk 19 grenade launcher; 1 × 60 mm (2.4 in) internal mortar; 12 × smoke grenades
- Engine: MTU 12V883 1119 kW (1501 hp) turbocharged diesel engine (4, 5)
- Power/weight: 18.8 kW/t
- Payload capacity: 48 rounds
- Transmission: Renk RK 325
- Suspension: Helical spring
- Ground clearance: 0.45 m (1.5 ft)
- Fuel capacity: 1400 litres
- Operational range: 500 km (310 mi)
- Maximum speed: 64 km/h (40 mph) on road; 55 km/h (34 mph) off road

The Merkava (Hebrew: מֶרְכָּבָה, [mɛʁkaˈva], "chariot") is a series of main battle tanks used by the Israel Defense Forces (IDF) which are the backbone of the IDF's Armored Corps. Current iterations of this tank are considered broadly equivalent to the capabilities of the M1 Abrams, Leopard 2 and the Challenger 2. The current Merkava uses the same MTU EuroPowerPack powerplant as a number of other tanks.

Development began in 1970, and its first generation, the Merkava Mark 1, entered official service in 1979. Four main variants have been deployed. As of 2023, Merkava Mark 4 Barak is the latest version. The Merkava was first used extensively in the 1982 Lebanon War. The name "Merkava" was derived from the IDF's initial development program name.

The tank was developed in the Merkava and Armored Combat Vehicles Division of the Israeli Ministry of Defense, and most of its parts are manufactured in Israel. The Merkava was designed to provide maximum protection for its crew, and therefore its front armor was fortified and the engine placed in the front part of the tank, unlike most other tanks.

Design criteria include rapid repair of battle damage, survivability, cost-effectiveness, and off-road performance. Following the model of contemporary self-propelled howitzers, the turret assembly is located closer to the rear than in most main battle tanks. With the engine in front, this layout is intended to provide additional protection against a frontal attack, so as to absorb some of the force of incoming shells and projectiles, especially for the personnel in the main hull, such as the driver. It also creates more space in the rear of the tank that allows increased storage capacity and a rear entrance to the main crew compartment allowing easy access under enemy fire. This allows the tank to be used as a platform for medical disembarkation (with no ammunition, the Merkava can hold up to 4 stretchers, but this is only an emergency measure), a forward command and control station, and an infantry fighting vehicle. The rear entrance's clamshell-style doors provide overhead protection when off- and on-loading cargo and personnel.

== Development ==
During the late 1960s, the Israeli Army collaborated on certain design aspects for the British Chieftain tank which had originally been introduced into British Army service in 1965, with a view to Israel purchasing and domestically producing the vehicle. Two Chieftain prototypes were delivered as part of a four-year trial. However, it was eventually decided not to sell the Chieftain to the Israelis, as the tanks were already being supplied to Arab countries, which prompted them to follow their own development programme.

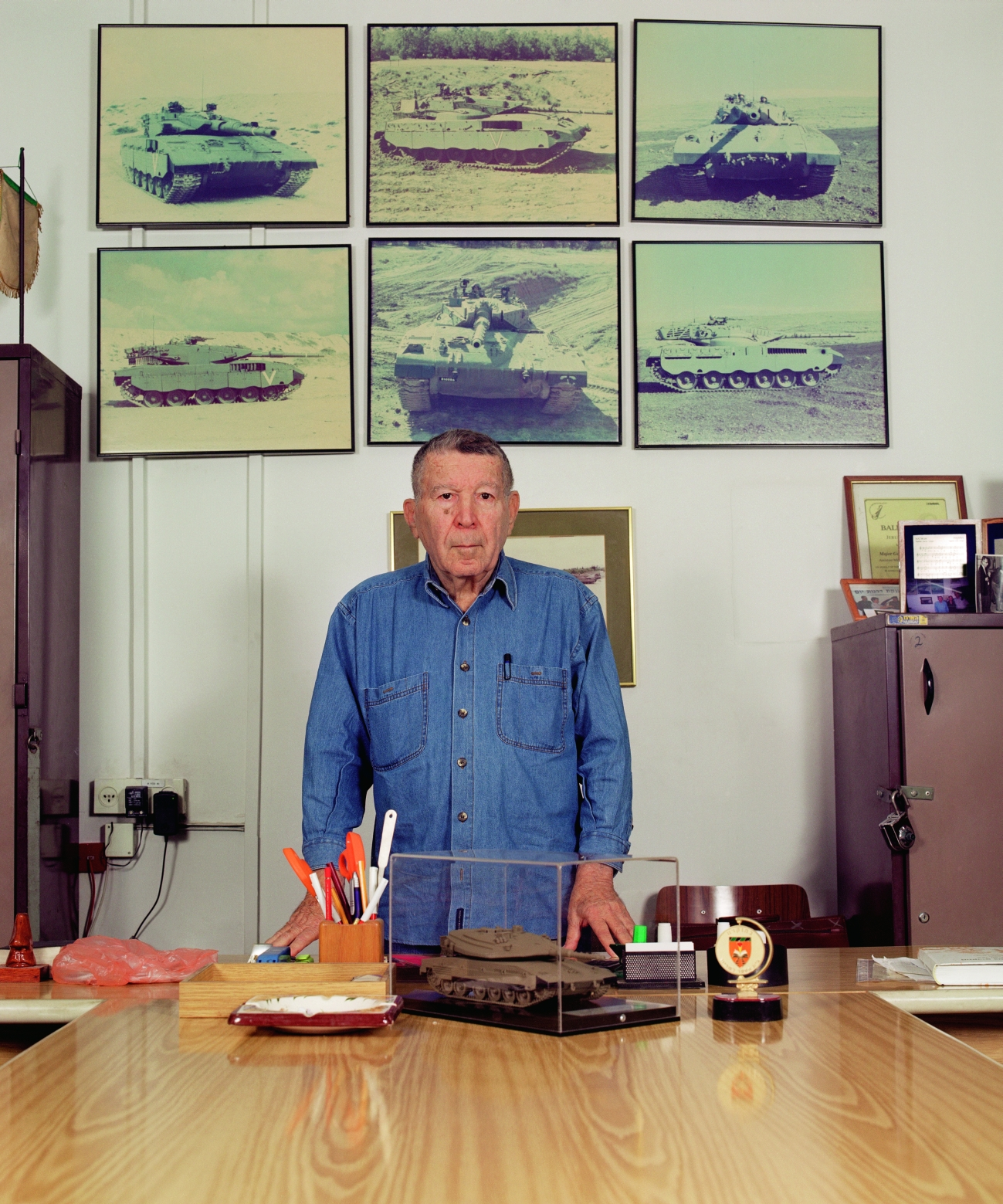
Israel Tal with a Merkava tank model, 2005

Israel Tal, who was serving as a brigade commander after the Suez Crisis, restarted plans to produce an indigenous Israeli tank, utilizing information learned from the 1973 Yom Kippur War – when Israel had suffered heavy losses of mechanized armour.

By 1974, initial designs were completed and prototypes were built. After a brief set of trials, work began to retool the Tel HaShomer ordnance depot for full-time development and construction. After the new facilities were completed, the Merkava was announced to the public in the International Defense Review periodical. The first official images of the tank were released to the American periodical Armed Forces Journal on May 4, 1977. The IDF officially adopted the tank in December 1979.

== Primary contractors ==
The lead organization for system integration of the Merkava's main components is Israel Military Industries (IMI). The Israeli Ordnance Corps are responsible for final Merkava assembly. More than 90% of the Merkava 4 tank's components are produced locally in Israel by Israeli defense industries. Contributors to the vehicle include:

- IMI manufactures the 105 mm and 120 mm main guns and their ammunition;
- TGL SP Industries LTD develop and production of the road wheels.
- Urdan Industries assembles and constructs the hull, drive- and powertrains, and turret assemblies;
- Soltam manufactures the 60 mm internal mortar;
- Elta designs and manufactures the electronic sensors and infrared optics;
- Elbit delivers the ballistics computer, fire-control system (FCS) and electric turret and gun control system;
- Tadiran provides cabin air conditioning, crew cabin intercom and radio equipment;
- El-Op, Elisra and Astronautics implement the optics and laser warning systems;
- Rafael Advanced Defense Systems builds and installs the Rafael Overhead Weapon Station (R-OWS) and Trophy active protection system;
- L-3 Communication Combat Propulsion Systems produces licensed copies of Germany's MTU MT883 1500 hp diesel engine powerplant and RENK RK325 transmissions;
- Motorola supplies Tadiran communication encryption systems;
- DuPont supplies the Nomex, ballistic, and fire-retardant materials used by Hagor;
- Russia Military Industries helped to design the KMT-4 & -5 anti-mine rollers and the ABK-3 dozer blade, now built by Urdan;
- FN Herstal supplies 7.62 mm (MAG 58) and 12.7 mm (M2) coaxial and pintle-mounted machine guns;
- Caterpillar assisted with an Israeli-designed track system.
- Bental Industries, a TAT Technologies subsidiary, produced the brushless motors used in the Mark 4 turret and gun control system.

== General characteristics ==
=== Firepower ===
The Merkava Mark 1 and 2 were armed with a 105 mm IMI M64 gun, a license-built variant of the M68. The Mark 3, Mark 3 Dor Dalet BAZ kassag, and the Mark 4 are armed with an IMI 120 mm smoothbore gun which can fire almost all versions of Western 120 mm smooth bore tank ammunition, as well as the LAHAT anti-tank guided missile.

Each model of the Merkava has two roof-mounted 7.62 mm machine guns for use by the commander and loader and another mounted co-axially with the main gun. A 60 mm mortar is also fitted for firing smoke rounds or suppressing dug-in infantry anti-tank teams.

All Merkava tanks are fitted with a remote-controlled M2 Browning .50 caliber heavy machine gun, aligned with the main gun and controlled from within the turret.

=== Mobility ===
The tank's 1,119 kW turbocharged diesel engine was designed by MTU and is manufactured under license by L-3 Communication Combat Propulsion Systems (formerly General Dynamics).

== Variants ==
=== Merkava Mark I ===
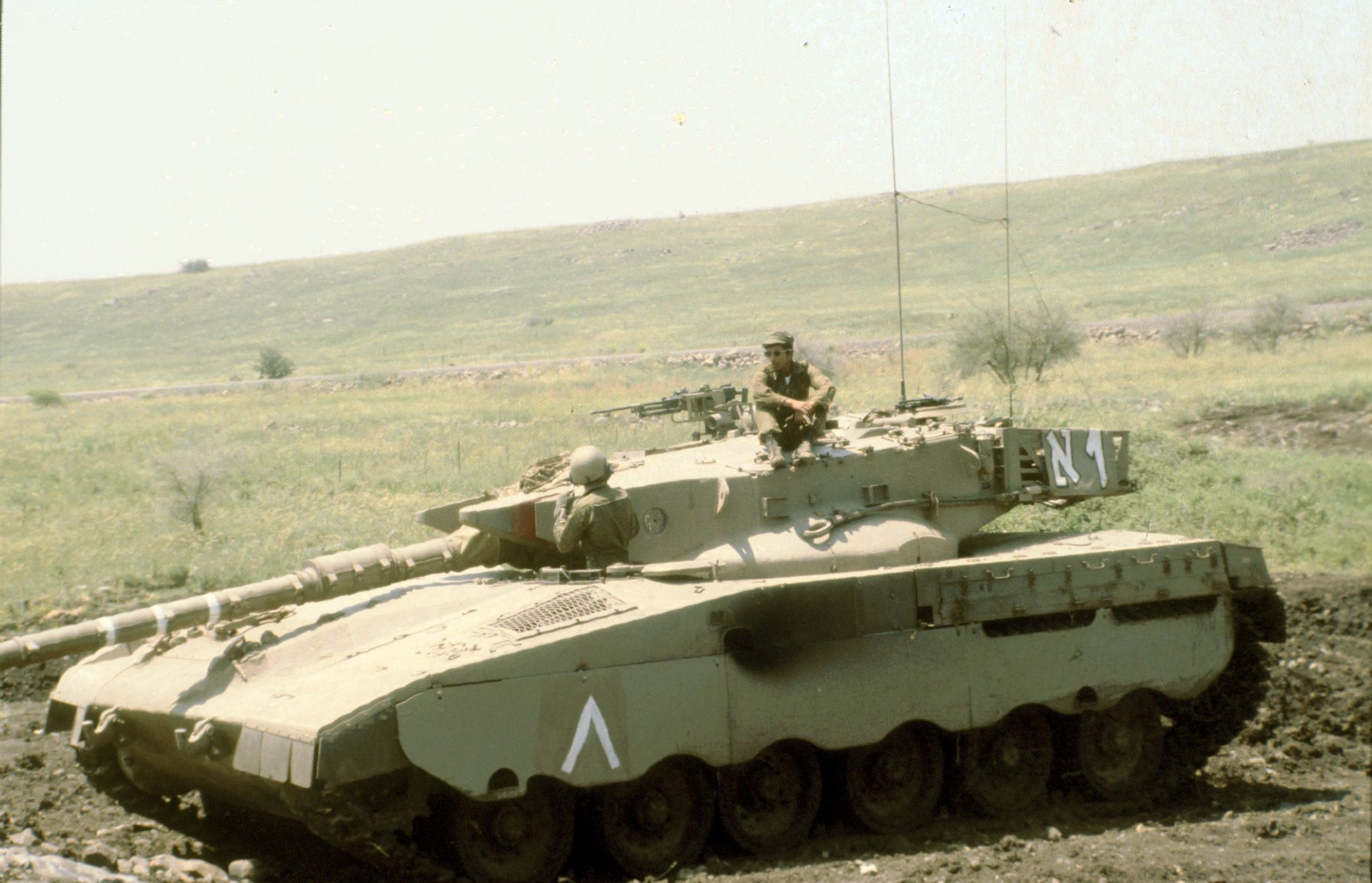
IDF Merkava I in the Golan Heights, 1987

The Mark 1, operational since 1979, is the original design created as a result of Israel Tal's decision, and was fabricated and designed for mass production. The Mark 1 weighed 63 tonnes and had a 908 horsepower (677 kW) diesel engine, with a power-to-weight ratio of 14 hp/Tonne. It was armed with the 105 millimeter M64 L71A main gun (a licensed copy of the American M68), two 7.62 mm machine guns for anti-infantry defense, and a 60 mm mortar mounted externally, with the mortar operator not completely protected by the tank's hull.

The general design borrows the tracks and road wheels from the British Centurion tank, which had seen extensive use during the Yom Kippur war.

The Merkava was first used in combat during the 1982 Lebanon War, where Israel deployed 180 units. Although they were a success, the M113 APCs that accompanied them were found to have several defects and were withdrawn. Merkavas were converted into makeshift APCs or armored ambulances by taking out the palleted ammunition racks in storage. Ten soldiers or walking wounded could enter and exit through the rear door.

After the war, many adjustments and additions were noted and designed, including the need for the 60 mm mortar to be installed within the hull and engineered for remote firing—a valuable feature that the Israelis had initially encountered on their Centurion Mk3s with their 2" Mk.III mortar. A shot trap was found beneath the rear of the turret bustle, where a well-placed shot could jam the turret completely. The installation of chain netting to disperse and destroy rocket propelled grenades and anti-tank rockets before impacting the primary armor increased survivability.

=== Merkava Mark II ===
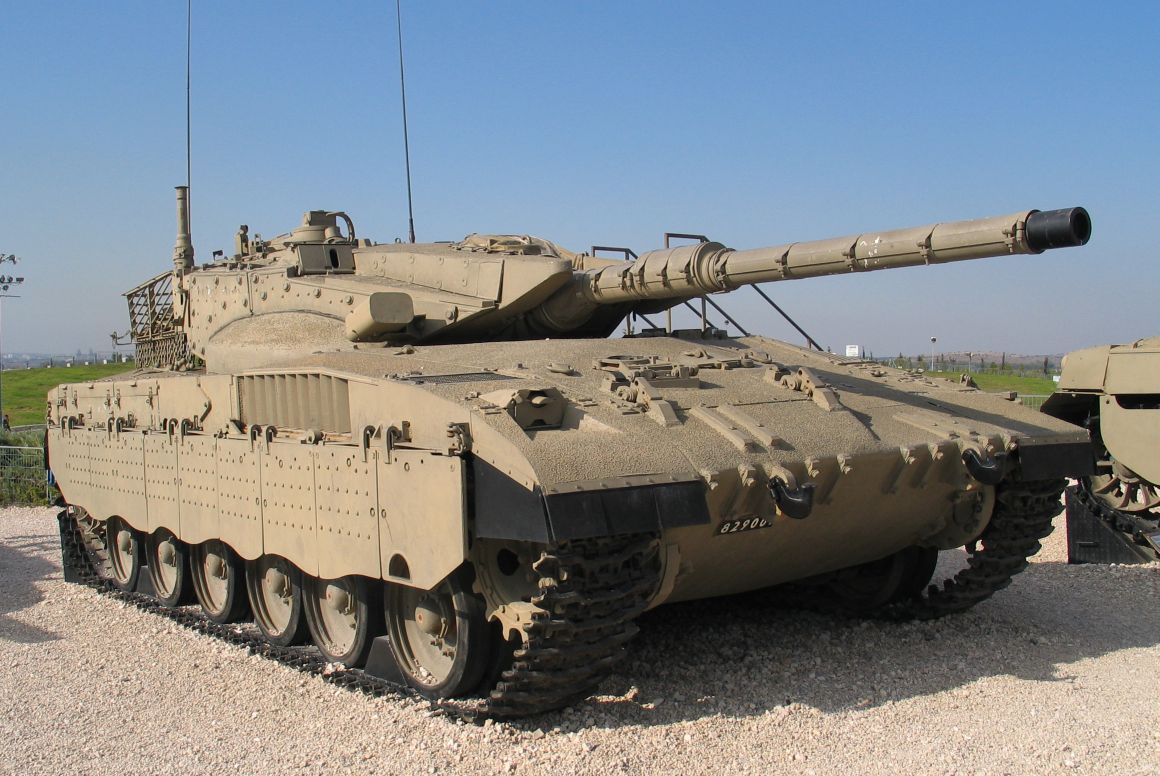
Merkava Mark II at Yad La-Shiryon

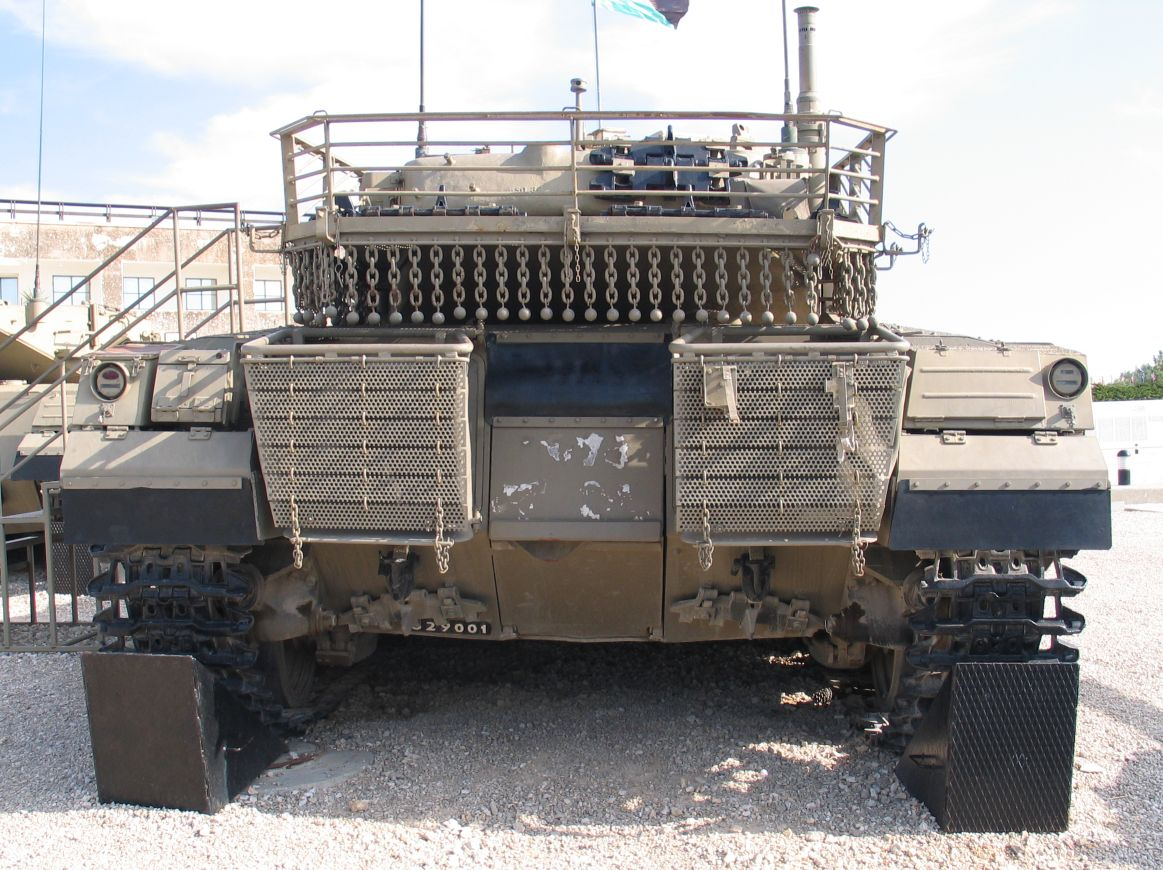
Merkava Mark II with chain netting installed behind the turret

The Merkava Mark II

The Mark II was first introduced into general service in April 1983. It incorporated numerous small adjustments as a result of the previous year's incursion into Lebanon.

The Mark II used the same 105 mm main gun and 7.62 mm machine guns as the Mark I, but the 60 mm mortar was redesigned during construction to be located within the hull and configured for remote firing to remove the need to expose the operator to enemy small-arms fire. An Israeli-designed automatic transmission and increased fuel storage for increased range was installed on all further Mark IIs. Anti-rocket netting was fitted for increased survivability against infantry equipped with anti-tank rockets. Many minor improvements were made to the fire-control system. Updated meteorological sensors, crosswind analyzers, and thermographic optics and image intensifiers gave greater visibility and battlefield awareness.

Newer versions of the original Mark II were designated:

- Mark IIB, with thermal optics and unspecified updates to the fire control system.
- Mark IIC, with more armor on the top of the turret to improve protection against attack from the air.
- Mark IID, with modular composite armor on the chassis and turret, allowing rapid replacement of damaged armor.

In 2015 the IDF had begun a plan to take the old models out of storage and repurpose them as heavy armored personnel carriers. Cannons, turrets, and spaces used to store tank shells inside the hull were removed to create a personnel carrier that outperforms the lighter M113 APC. Converting hundreds of Mark II chassis provides a low-cost way to upgrade support units' abilities to perform medical, logistical, and rescue missions.

By late 2016, the last conscripted brigade to operate Merkava 2 was scheduled to transition to Merkava III and Merkava IV tanks for battlefield missions, relegating the vehicles to reserve forces for border patrols during conflicts and conversion to personnel carriers.

=== Merkava Mark 3 ===
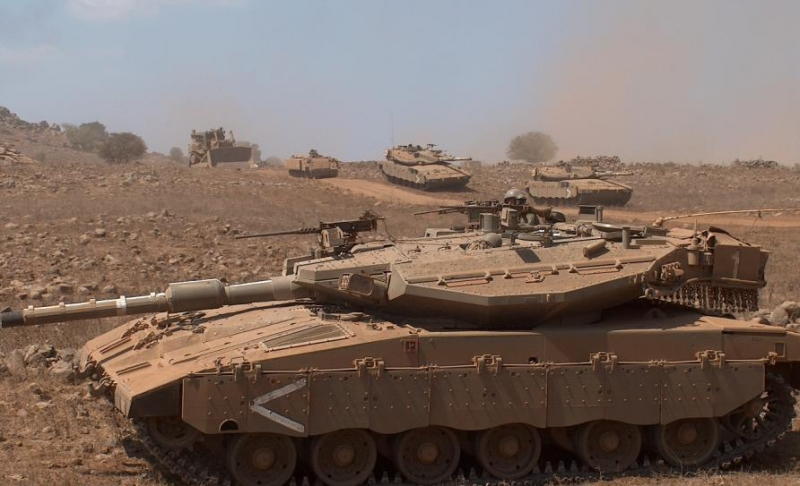
The Merkava Mark III

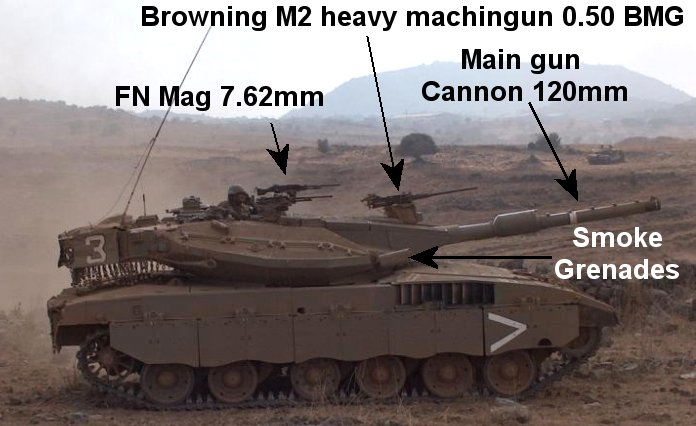
The more advanced, Merkava Mark III Baz model, with weaponry highlighted

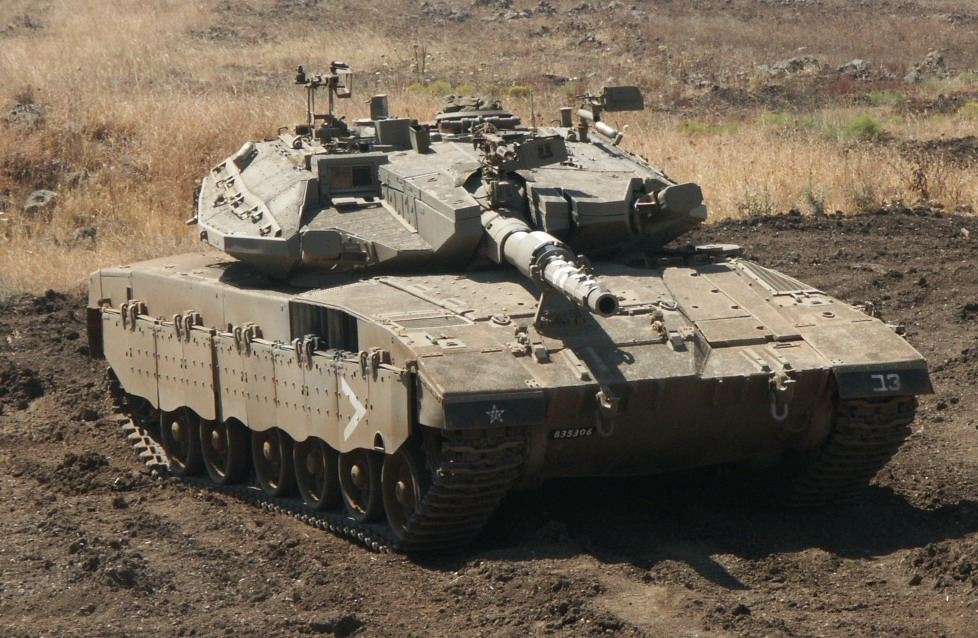
Merkava Mark III Dor Dalet BAZ Kasag, the most advanced Merkava III variant

Variants of the Merkava Mark III

The Merkava Mark 3 was introduced in December 1989 and was in production until 2003. As of 2016, the Merkava III was the most numerous tank in frontline IDF service. Compared to the Merkava II, it has upgrades to the drivetrain, powertrain, armament, and electronic systems. The most prominent addition was the incorporation of the locally developed IMI 120 mm gun. This gun and a larger 1,200 horsepower (890 kW) diesel engine raised the total weight of the tank to 65 tonnes (143000 lb), but the larger engine raised the maximum cruising speed to 60 km/h (37 mph).

The turret was re-engineered for movement independent of the tank chassis, allowing it to track a target regardless of the tank's movement. Many other changes were made, including:

- External two-way telephone for secure communications between the tank crew and dismounted infantry,
- Merkava III shooting a shell, FN MAG and smoke grenade. It then turns on the smoke screen system. The demonstration concludes with the throwing of a green smoke hand grenade (1 m 16 s).
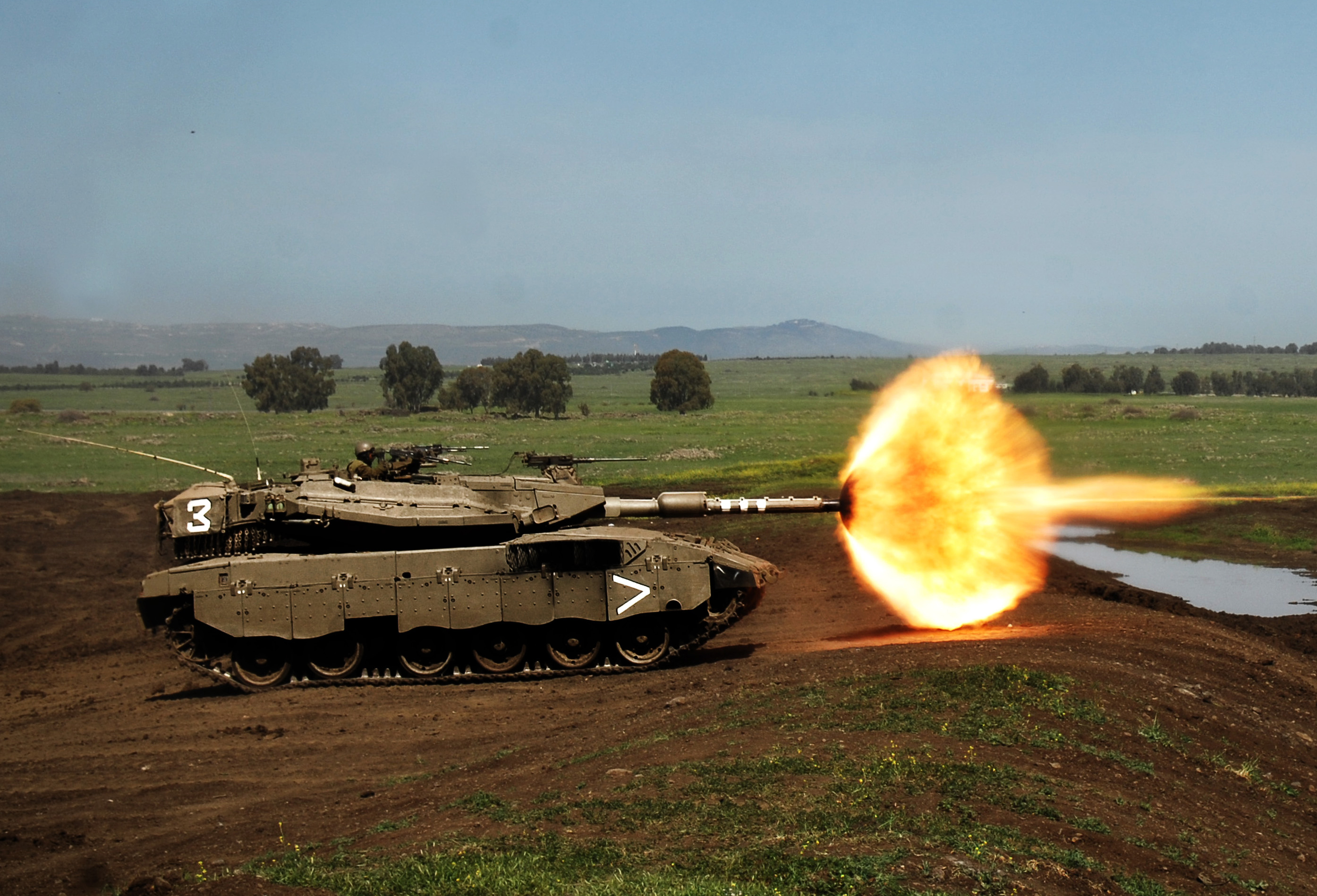
  Merkava IIID Baz fires – the Baz Fire-control system increases the Merkava's accuracy and lethality
  Upgraded ammunition storage containers to minimize ammunition cook-off
- Addition of laser designators
- Incorporation of the Kasag modular armor system, designed for rapid replacement and repair in the battlefield and for quick upgrading as new designs and sophisticated materials become available

==== BAZ System ====
The 1995 Mark 3 BAZ (Hebrew acronym for ברק זוהר, Barak Zoher, signifying Shining Lightning) had several updates and added systems including:

- NBC protection systems
- Locally developed central air-conditioning system
- Added improvements in ballistic protection
- The Mark 3D has removable modular composite armor on the chassis and turret

==== Dor-Dalet ====
The last generation of the Mark 3 class was the Mark 3D Dor-Dalet (Hebrew: Fourth Generation), which included several components as prototypes to be introduced in the Mark 4.

- Upgraded and strengthened tracks (built by Caterpillar, designed in Israel),
- Installation of the Rafael Overhead Weapon Station.
- Independent, fully stabilised, panoramic commander's sights allowing "hunter-killer" ability.
- Advanced thermal imagers for both gunner and commander.

=== Merkava Mark 4 ===
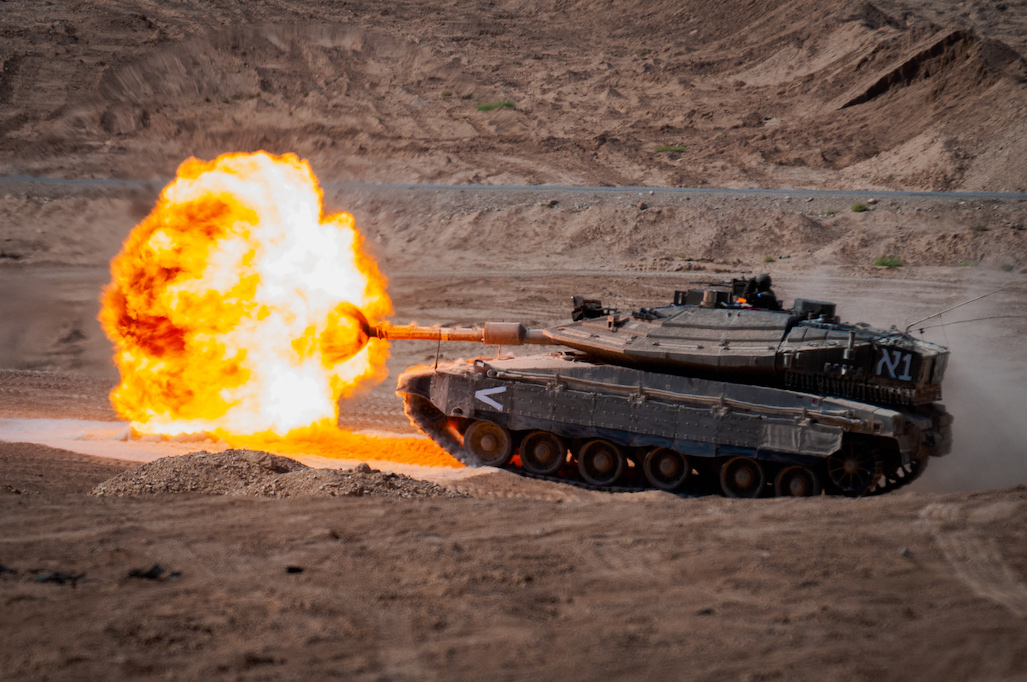
Merkava Mark IV firing

The development of Merkava Mark 4 was begun in 1999, and production in 2004. The upgrade's development was announced in an October 1999 edition of the military publication Bamachaneh ("At the Camp"). However, the Merkava Mark 3 remained in production until 2003. The first Merkava IVs were in production in limited numbers by the end of 2004.

Removable modular armor, from the Merkava Mark 3D, is used on all sides, including the top and a V-shaped belly armor pack for the underside. This modular system is designed to allow damaged tanks to be rapidly repaired and returned to the field. Because rear armor is thinner, chains with iron balls are attached to detonate projectiles before they hit the main armored hull.

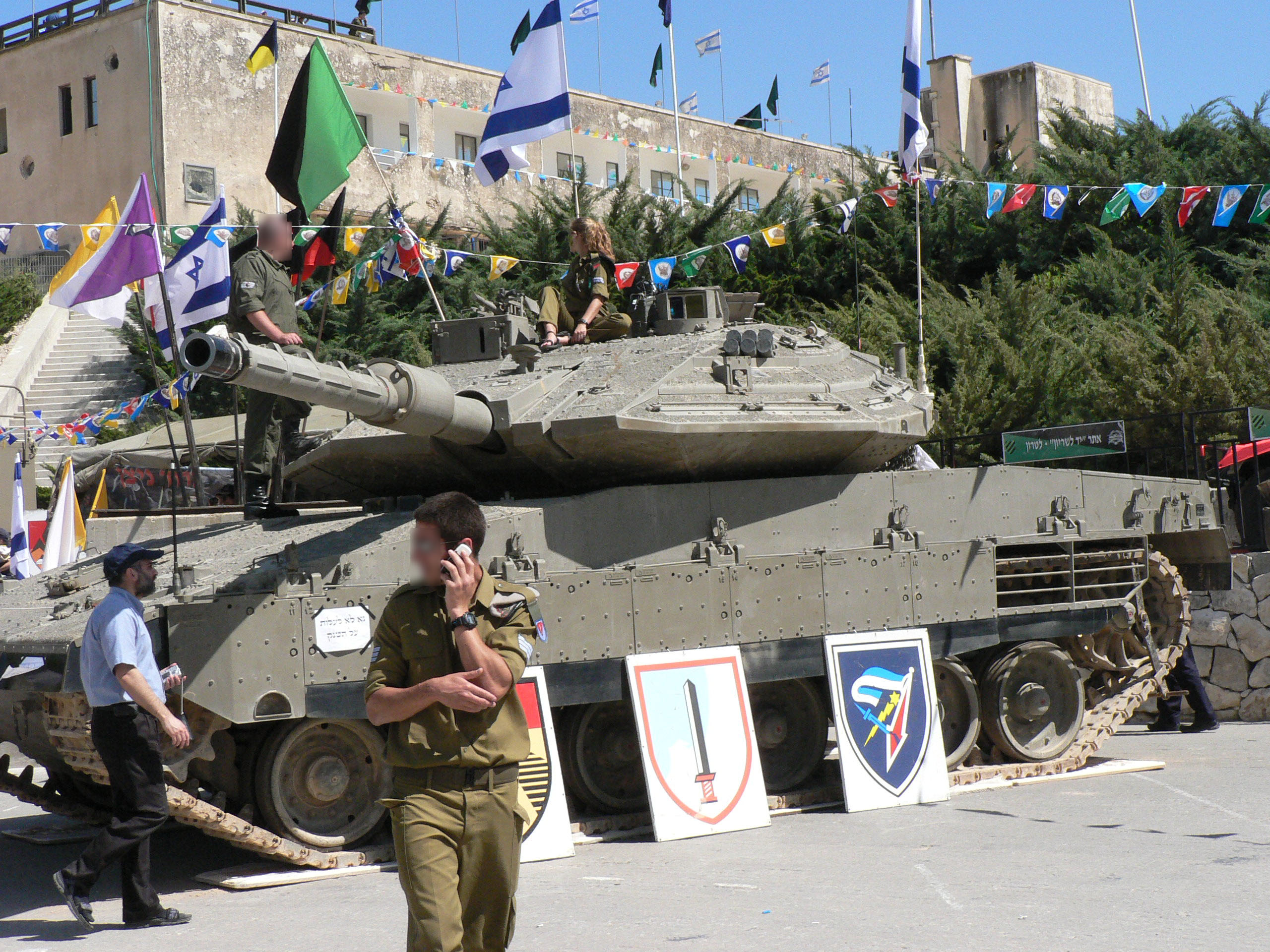
The Merkava Mark IV in its first public show at Yad La-Shiryon during Israeli Independence Day celebrations in 2002.

It is the first contemporary tank without a loader's hatch in the turret roof, because any aperture in the turret roof increases risk of penetration by ATGMs. Tank rounds are stored in individual fire-proof canisters, which reduce the chance of cook-offs in a fire inside the tank. The turret is electrically, rather than hydraulically, powered (hydraulic turrets use flammable liquid that ignites if the turret is penetrated) and "dry": no active rounds are stored in it. Merkava tanks since the IIc, including the Mark IV, have enhanced armor on top of the turret, providing more protection to the crew against drone strikes. Some features, such as hull shaping, exterior non-reflective paints (radar cross-section reduction), and shielding for engine heat plumes mixing with outside air (reduced infrared signature) to confuse enemy thermal imagers, were carried over from the IAI Lavi program of the Israeli Air Force to make the tank harder to spot and target by heat sensors and radar.

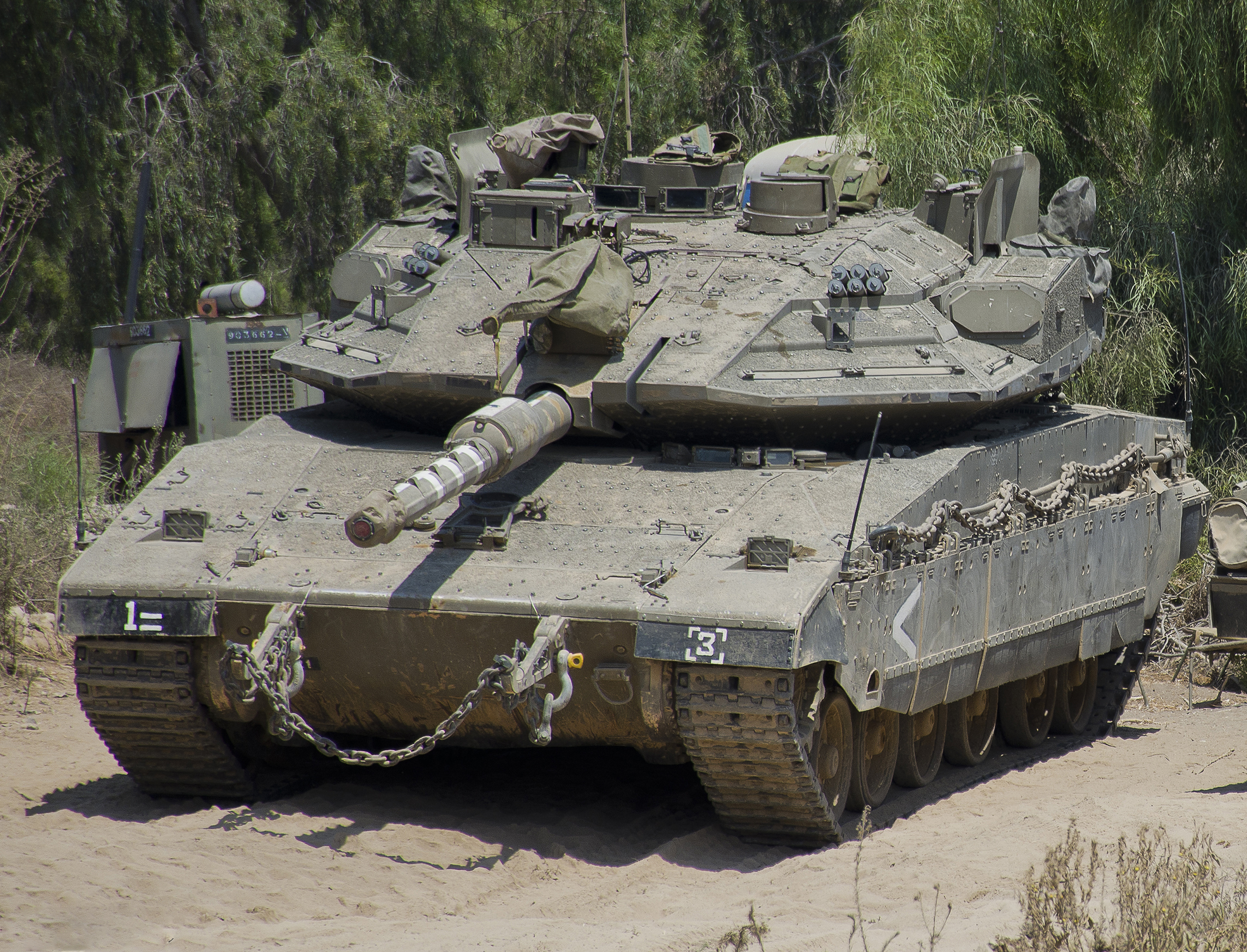
Merkava Mk 4M, 2016

The Mark 4 includes the larger 120 mm main gun of the previous versions, but can fire a wider variety of ammunition, including high-explosive anti-tank (HEAT), and sabot rounds like the armor-piercing fin-stabilized discarding sabot (APFSDS) kinetic energy penetrator, using an electrical semi-automatic revolving magazine for 10 rounds. It also includes a much larger 12.7 mm machine gun for anti-vehicle operations (most commonly used against technicals).

The Mark IV has the Israeli-designed TSAWS (tracks, springs, and wheels system) caterpillar track system, called "Mazkom" (Hebrew: מערכת זחלים קפיצים ומרכובים, מזקו"ם) by troops. This system is designed to reduce track-shedding under the harsh basalt rock conditions of Lebanon and the Golan Heights.

The model has a new fire-control system, the El-Op Knight Mark 4. An Amcoram LWS-2 laser warning receiver notifies the crew of threats like laser-guided anti-tank missiles and the fire-control system can launch smoke grenades to obscure the tank from the laser beam. Electromagnetic warning against radar illumination is also installed.

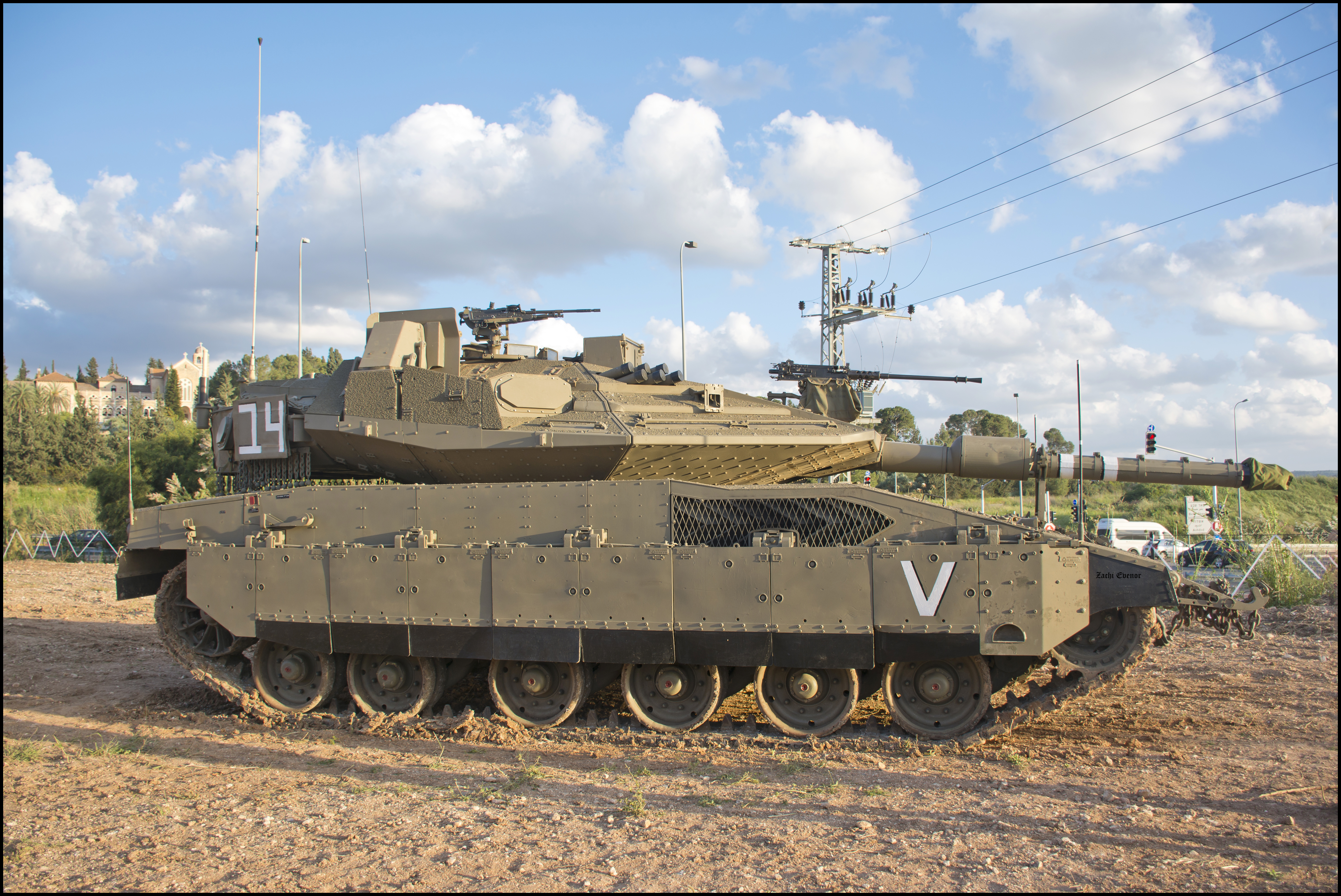
A profile of a Merkava Mk 4M tank, armed with an IMI 120 mm gun, a M2 Browning .50-cal, a 7.62×51 mm NATO commander's FN MAG, and equipped with the Trophy active protection system.

The tank carries the Israeli Elbit Systems BMS (Battle Management System; Hebrew: צי"ד), a centralised system that takes data from tracked units and UAVs in theater, displays it on color screens, and distributes it in encrypted form to all other units in a given theater equipped with BMS.

The Merkava IV has been designed for fast repair and replacement of damaged armour, with modular armour that can be easily removed and replaced. It is designed to be cost-effective in production and maintenance.

The tank has a high-performance air conditioning system, and can be fitted with a toilet for long-duration missions.

==== Mark 4 Meil Ru'ach (Mk 4M) Windbreaker ====
The Merkava Mark 4M (Mk 4M) Windbreaker is a Merkava Mark 4 equipped with the Trophy active protection system (APS), designated "Meil Ruach" (Hebrew: מעיל רוח; "Windbreaker" or "Wind Coat"). Mass production of Mark 4M tanks began in 2009, and the first whole brigade of Mark 4Ms was declared operational in 2011. The Trophy APS successfully intercepted rocket-propelled grenades and anti-tank missiles, including 9M133 Kornets, fired by Hamas before and during Operation Protective Edge in 2014.

==== Mark 4 Meil Ru'ach 400 (Mk. 4M 400) Windbreaker ====
A midlife upgrade for the Mk. 4M that is somewhat of a bridge between the Mk. 4M and the Mk. 4 Barak.

=== Merkava 4 Barak ===
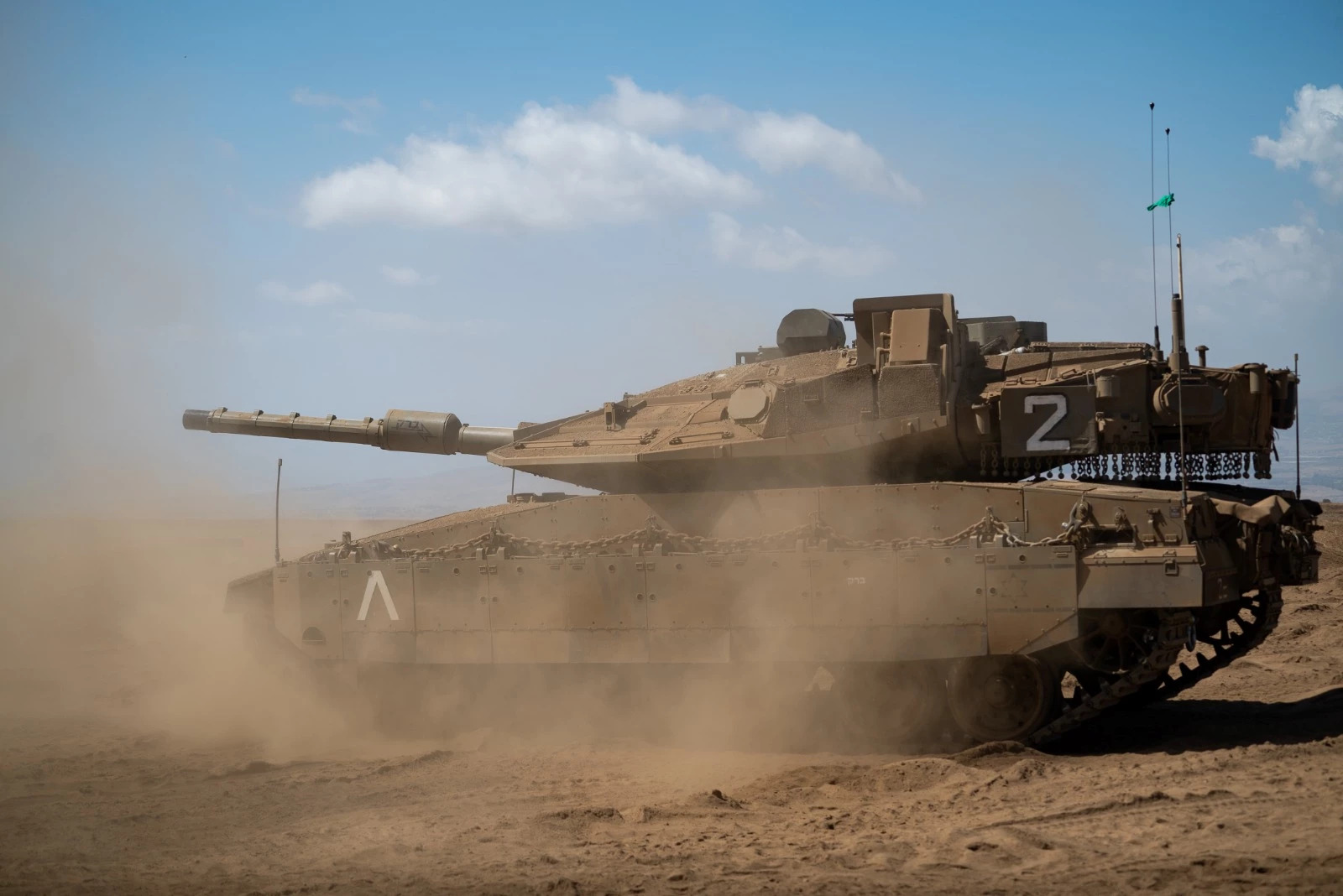
Merkava Mk 4 Barak

The Merkava Mark 4 Barak (Lightning) entered service in 2023. The tank has an upgraded Trophy APS, 360-degree day/night camera coverage for boosted situational awareness, a fighter jet–style helmet-mounted display for the tank commander, and new sensors enabling it to independently acquire targets and strike them rapidly, as well as having electronic warfare abilities and advanced processing systems, and a direct energy system capable of intercepting drones and cruise missiles.

==== Iron Vision helmet-mounted display system ====
A main feature of the Barak, unveiled in July 2018, is the integration of the Iron Vision helmet-mounted augmented reality system, using high-resolution cameras arrayed around the tank to provide a 360° virtual reality view of a tank's surroundings to crew members' helmet displays while protected inside. Israeli company Elbit developed the system for the F-35 fighter aircraft.

=== Specifications of models ===
	Merkava Mark 1	Merkava Mark 2	Merkava Mark 3	Merkava Mark 4
Service history
In active service	1979–2014	1983–2020	1990–	2004–
Used by	Israel Defense Forces			
Wars	1982 Lebanon War, First Intifada, South Lebanon Conflict, Second Intifada, 2006 Lebanon War	South Lebanon Conflict, First Intifada, Second Intifada, 2006 Lebanon War, Gaza War	South Lebanon Conflict, First Intifada, Second Intifada, 2006 Lebanon War, Gaza War, 2014 Israel–Gaza conflict, Operation Protective Edge, Gaza war	2006 Lebanon War, Gaza War, 2014 Israel–Gaza conflict, Operation Protective Edge, Gaza war
Production history
Designer	MANTAK (Merkava Tank Office)			
Manufacturer	MANTAK (Merkava Tank Office)			
Produced	1979–83	1983–89	1990–2002	2003–
Number built	250	580	780	360
Specifications
Weight	61 tonnes	62 tonnes	63.5 tonnes	65 tonnes
Length	8.30 m (27 ft 3 in), rear to muzzle 7.45 m (24 ft 5 in), without gun		9.04 m (29 ft 8 in), rear to muzzle 7.60 m (24 ft 11 in), without gun	
Width	3.70 m (12 ft 2 in), without skirts			3.72 m (12 ft 2 in), without skirts
Height	2.65 m (8.7 ft), turret roof		2.66 m (8.7 ft), turret roof	
Crew	4 (tank commander, driver, gunner, loader). May carry infantry as passengers.			
Armor	Cast and welded steel, in a spaced configuration	Cast and welded steel, in a spaced configuration with add-on composite armour on turret sides	Steel frame with modular composite armor	
Primary armament	105 mm (4.1 in) M64 L71A rifled tank gun		120 mm (4.7 in) MG251 smoothbore tank gun	120 mm (4.7 in) MG251-LR smoothbore tank gun
Ammunition capacity	53 to 62 rounds, 6 per container		46 rounds, 5 ready in a mechanical drum	48 rounds, 10 ready in an electrical drum
Secondary armament	2–3 × FN MAG58; 1 × externally-mounted 60 mm Soltam mortar 12 × smoke grenades launchers	2–3 × FN MAG58; 1 × internally-mounted 60 mm Soltam mortar 12 × smoke grenades launchers		
Engine	Teledyne Continental AVDS-1790-6A 908 hp (677 kW) V12 air-cooled diesel engine	Teledyne Continental AVDS-1790-7A 950 hp (708 kW) V12 air-cooled diesel engine	Teledyne Continental AVDS-1790-9AR 1,200 hp (895 kW) V12 air-cooled diesel	General Dynamics GD883 (MTU883) 1,500 hp (1,119 kW) V12 water-cooled diesel
Transmission	Allison CD850-6BX (2 fwd, 1 rev)	Renk RK 304 (4 fwd, 4 rev)		Renk RK 325 (5 fwd, 2 rev)
acceleration 0–32 km/h	15 s	13 s	10 s	<10 s
Power / weight	14.8 hp/tonne	15.3 hp/tonne	18.8 hp/tonne	23 hp/tonne
Suspension type	Vertical double coil spring		Vertical coil spring with rotary coil spring	
Total vertical wheel travel	295–380 mm		600 mm	
Ground clearance	0.53 m (1 ft 9 in)		0.45 m (1 ft 6 in)	
Fuel capacity	900 litres		1,100 litres	1,400 litres
Operational range	400–500 km (250–310 mi)	500 km (310 mi)		
Maximum road speed	46 km/h (29 mph)	55 km/h (34 mph)	60 km/h (37 mph)	64 km/h (40 mph)

== Combat history ==
The Merkava has participated in the following actions.

=== 1982 Lebanon War ===
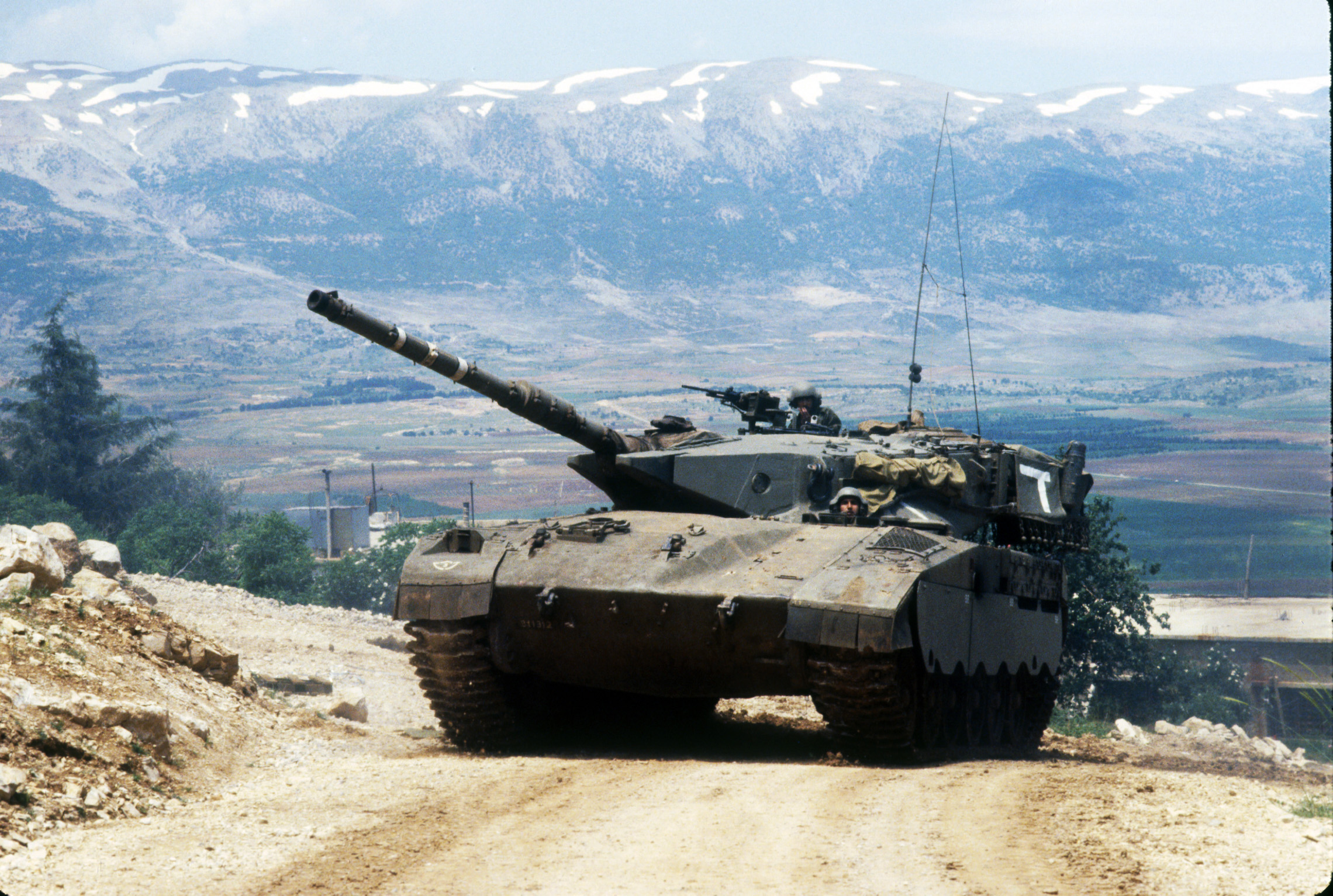
IDF Merkava I in the eastern Lebanon, 1983

The Merkava was used widely during the 1982 Lebanon War. The tank outperformed contemporary Syrian tanks (mostly T-62s), and its front proved largely immune to the anti-tank weapons of the time (the AT-3 Sagger and RPG-7) that were used against it. It was judged to be a significant improvement over Israel's formerly most effective main battle tank, the Centurion. Israel lost dozens of tanks during the conflict, including several Merkavas.

=== Second Intifada ===
In February 2002, a Merkava III was destroyed by a roadside bomb near Netzarim in the Gaza Strip. The tank was lured into intervening in an attack on a settler convoy. The tank went over a heavy mine (estimated 100 kg TNT), which detonated and totally destroyed the tank. Four soldiers were killed in the blast. This was the first main battle tank to be destroyed during the Second Intifada. A second Merkava II or Merkava III, was destroyed a month later in the same area and a further three soldiers were killed. A third Merkava II or III tank was destroyed near the Kissufim Crossing, when one soldier was killed and two wounded.

=== 2006 Lebanon War ===
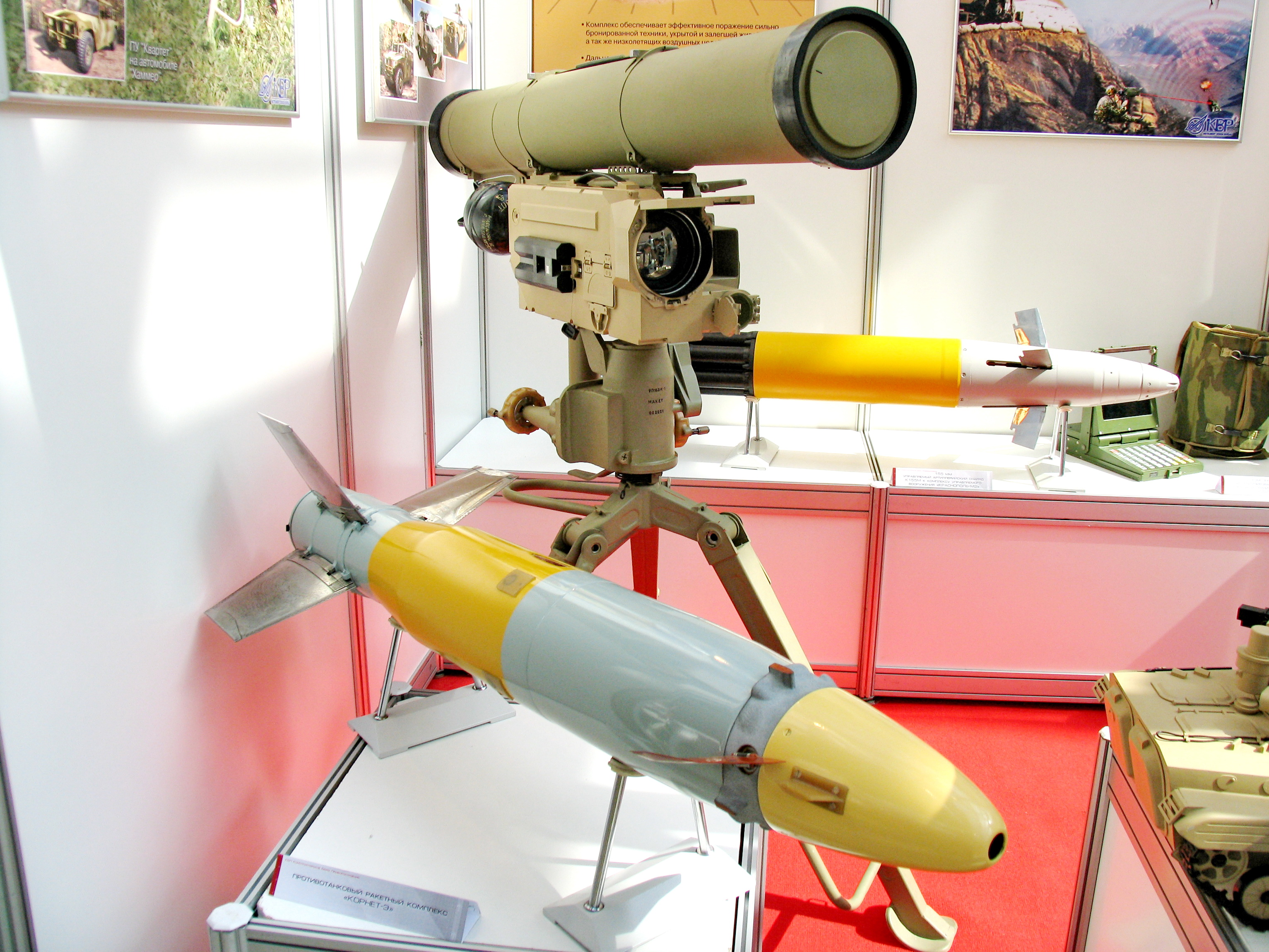
The AT-14 Kornet anti-tank laser-guided missile

During the 2006 Lebanon War, five Merkava tanks were destroyed. Most of the tanks engaged were Merkava IIIs and earlier versions; only a few of the tanks used during the war were Merkava Mark 4, since by 2006 they had entered service in limited numbers. Hezbollah fired over 1,000 anti-tank missiles during the conflict against both tanks and dismounted infantry. Some 45 percent of all tanks and armoured vehicles hit with anti-tank guided missiles (ATGMs) during the conflict suffered some form of armour penetration.

In total, 15 tank crewmen were killed by these ATGM penetrations. The penetrations were caused by tandem warhead missiles. Hezbollah weaponry was believed to include Russian RPG-29 'Vampir', AT-5 'Konkurs', AT-13 'Metis-M', and laser-guided AT-14 'Kornet' HEAT missiles. The RPG-29 was able to defeat the advanced reactive armor on the Merkava 4. The IDF reported finding Kornet ATGMs on Hezbollah positions in the village of Ghandouriyeh. Several months after the cease-fire, reports have provided detailed photographic evidence that Kornet ATGMs were indeed both possessed and used by Hezbollah in this area.

Another Merkava IV tank crewman was killed when a tank ran over an improvised explosive device (IED). This tank had additional V-shaped underside armor, limiting casualties to just one of the seven personnel (four crewmen and three infantrymen) on board. In total, five Merkava tanks (two Merkava IIs, one Merkava III, and two Merkava IVs) were destroyed. Of these two Merkava Mark 4, one was damaged by an IED, and the other being destroyed by a Russian AT-14 'Kornet' missile. The Israeli military said that it was satisfied with the Merkava Mark IV's performance, and attributed problems to insufficient training before the war. In total, 50 Merkava tanks (predominantly Merkava IIs and IIIs) were hit, eight of which remained serviceable on the battlefield. 21 tanks suffered armour penetrations (15 from missiles, and 6 from IEDs and anti-tank mines).

After the 2006 war, and as the IDF becomes increasingly involved in unconventional and guerrilla warfare, some analysts say the Merkava is too vulnerable to advanced anti-tank missiles, that in their man-portable types can be fielded by guerrilla warfare opponents. Other post-war analysts, including David Eshel, disagree, arguing that reports of losses to Merkavas were overstated and that "summing up the performance of Merkava tanks, especially the latest version Merkava Mark 4, most tank crews agree that, in spite of the losses sustained and some major flaws in tactical conduct, the tank proved its mettle in its first high-saturation combat."

On a comparison done by the armor corps newsletter, it was shown that the average number of crewmen killed per tank penetrated by missile/rocket was reduced from 2 during the Yom Kippur War to 1.5 during the 1982 Lebanon War to 1 during the 2006 Lebanon War proving how, even in the face of the improvement in anti-tank weaponry, the Merkava series tanks provide increasingly better protection to its crew. The IDF wanted to increase orders of new Merkava Mark 4 tanks, and planned to add the Trophy active defense system to Merkava Mark 4 tanks, and to increase joint training between crews and Israeli anti-tank soldiers.

=== Operation Cast Lead ===
The Merkava Mark IV was used more extensively during the Gaza War, as it had been received by the IDF in increasing numbers since 2006, replacing more of the Merkava II and III versions of the tank that were in service. One brigade of Merkava IVs managed to bisect the Gaza strip in five hours without Israeli casualties. The commander of the brigade stated that battlefield tactics had been greatly revised since 2006. Tactics had also been modified to focus on asymmetric or guerrilla war threats, in addition to the conventional war scenarios that the Merkava had mainly been designed to combat.

The IDF also deployed the Merkava II and III during the war.

=== Gaza border areas ===
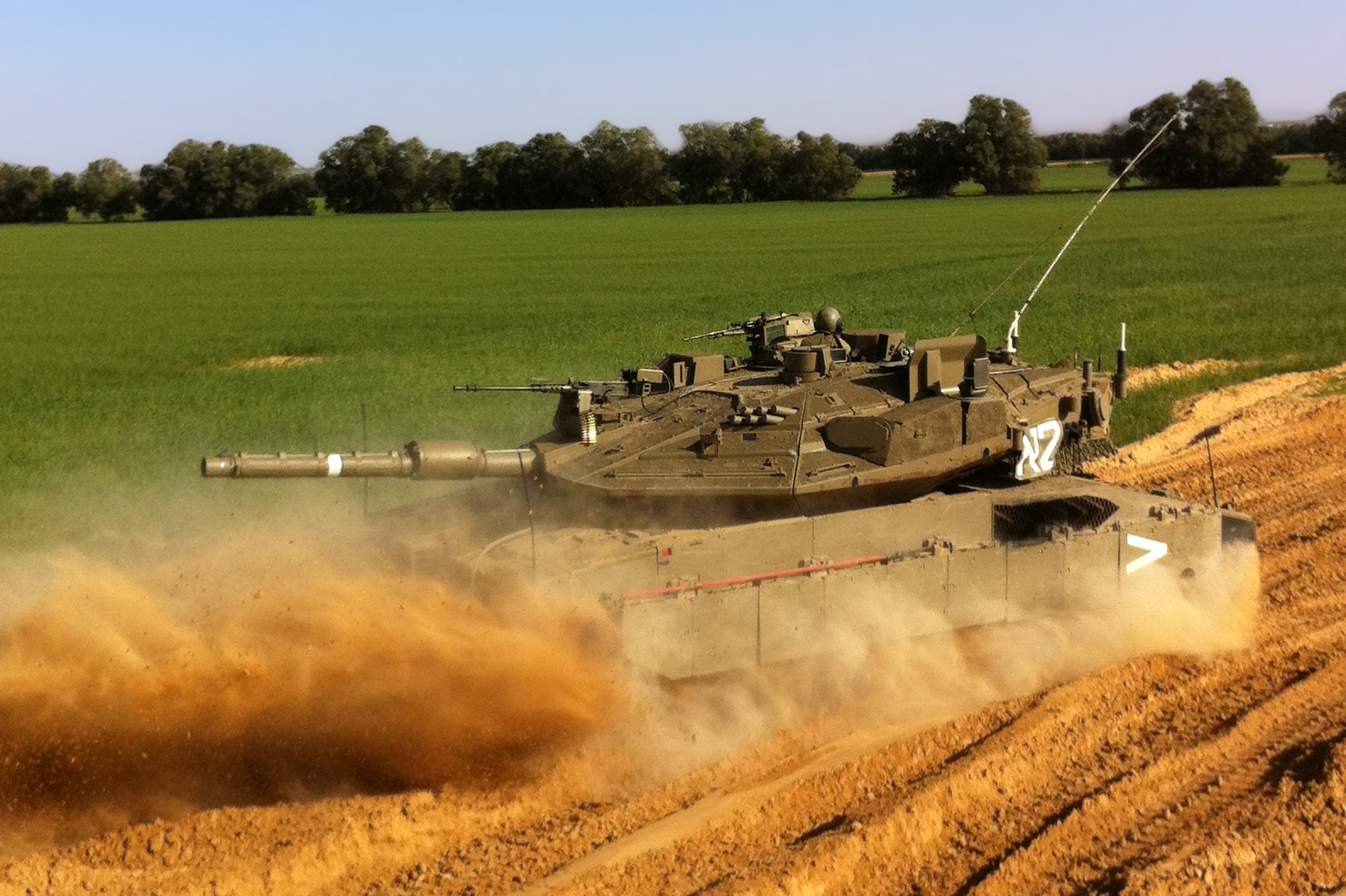
IDF Merkava Mk. IVm tank on the Gaza border. It is equipped with the Trophy APS. The Trophy protective system has been used by the IDF since 2011.

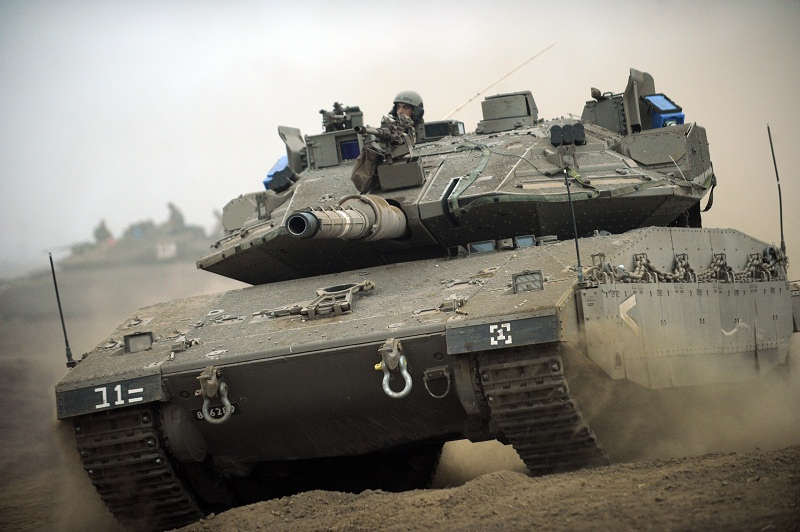
Merkava IV equipped with the Trophy active defense system.

By October 2010, the IDF had begun to equip the first Merkava Mark IVs with the Trophy active protection system, to improve the tanks' protection against advanced anti-tank missiles which use tandem-charge HEAT warheads. Added protection systems included an Elbit laser-warning system and IMI in-built smoke-screen grenades.

In December 2010, Hamas fired an AT-14 Kornet anti-tank missile at a Merkava Mark 3 tank stationed on the Israel-Gaza border near Al-Bureij. Before then, it was not suspected that Hamas possessed such an advanced missile. The missile penetrated the tank's armour, but caused no injuries among its crew. As a result of the attack, Israel decided to deploy its first Merkava Mark 4 battalion equipped with the Trophy system along the Gaza border.

On March 1, 2011, a Merkava Mark IV stationed near the Gaza border, equipped with the Trophy active protection system, successfully foiled a missile attack against it, marking the system's first operational success.

=== Operation Protective Edge 2014 ===
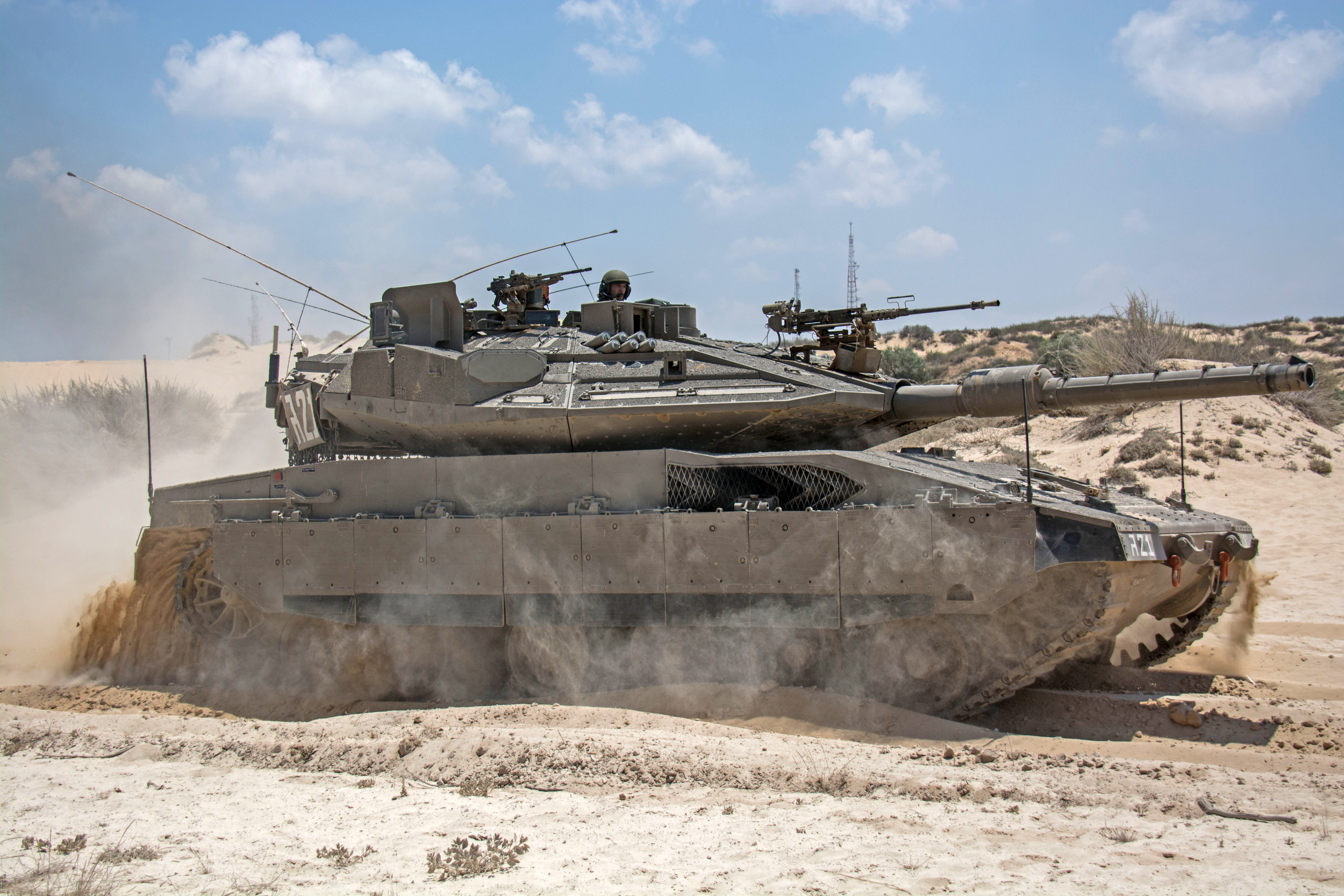
Merkava Mk 4M Windbreaker, fitted with Trophy active protection system, during Operation Protective Edge

No tanks were damaged during Operation Protective Edge. The Merkava Mk 4M tanks, fitted with the Trophy Active Protection system, intercepted anti-tank missiles and RPGs on dozens of occasions during the ground operation. During the operation, the system intercepted anti-tank weapons, mostly Kornet, and some Metis-M and RPG-29, proving itself effective against man-portable anti-tank weapons. By identifying the source of fire, Trophy also allowed tanks to kill a Hamas anti-tank team on one occasion.

Giora Katz, head of Rafael's land division, stated that it was a "breakthrough because it is the first time in military history where an active defense system has proven itself in intense fighting."

The 401st Brigade, equipped with Merkava Mk 4M tanks, alone killed between 120 and 130 Hamas fighters during the ground fighting phase of Operation Protective Edge, according to the IDF.

=== 2023 Israel-Hamas War ===
According to Popular Mechanics, Hamas may have briefly captured 10 Merkava tanks in the October 7 attacks, but it is unclear how many tanks they damaged or destroyed. At least 1 tank was destroyed when Hamas used a civilian DJI and Autel quadcopter drone to drop a shaped-charge grenade.

According to Forbes, Hamas used flyers to disseminate advice for defeating the Merkava's Trophy active protection system. This advice included such things as: firing rocket-propelled grenades from 50 yards or closer; firing several RPG rounds in quick succession; using an SPG-9, and other information.

On 16 October 2023, Merkavas were seen equipped with added slat armour placed above the turrets. Slat armour has proven effective in defense against a number of munitions dropped by small drones. Hamas has released video footage that suggested unsuccessful strikes against Merkavas using drones.

In December 2023, Business Insider reported that Hamas had "knocked out" about 20 tanks.

On 24 May 2024, The Al-Qassam Brigades reported having destroyed an Merkava MK 2 using a “Shawaz” explosive device in the Al-Qasasib neighborhood of Jabalia Camp.

In October 2024, Ynet reported that the IDF planned to outsource repair of its armored vehicles including tanks for the first time due to damage sustained during the Israel-Hamas War. The following month, the IDF reported shortages of tanks and tank shells.

=== 2024 Israel–Hezbollah war ===
IDF said soldiers from the 36th armored division had also entered operations in Lebanon joining forces from the 98th division already operating in the border area.

On 2 October 2024, Hezbollah said it had destroyed three Israeli Merkava tanks with rockets.

On 3 May 2026, Hezbollah claimed to have destroyed a Mk 4 Merkava tank with a fpv drone.

== Derivatives ==
Following the Second Intifada the Israel Defense Forces modified some of their Merkavas to satisfy the needs of urban warfare.

=== Merkava LIC ===
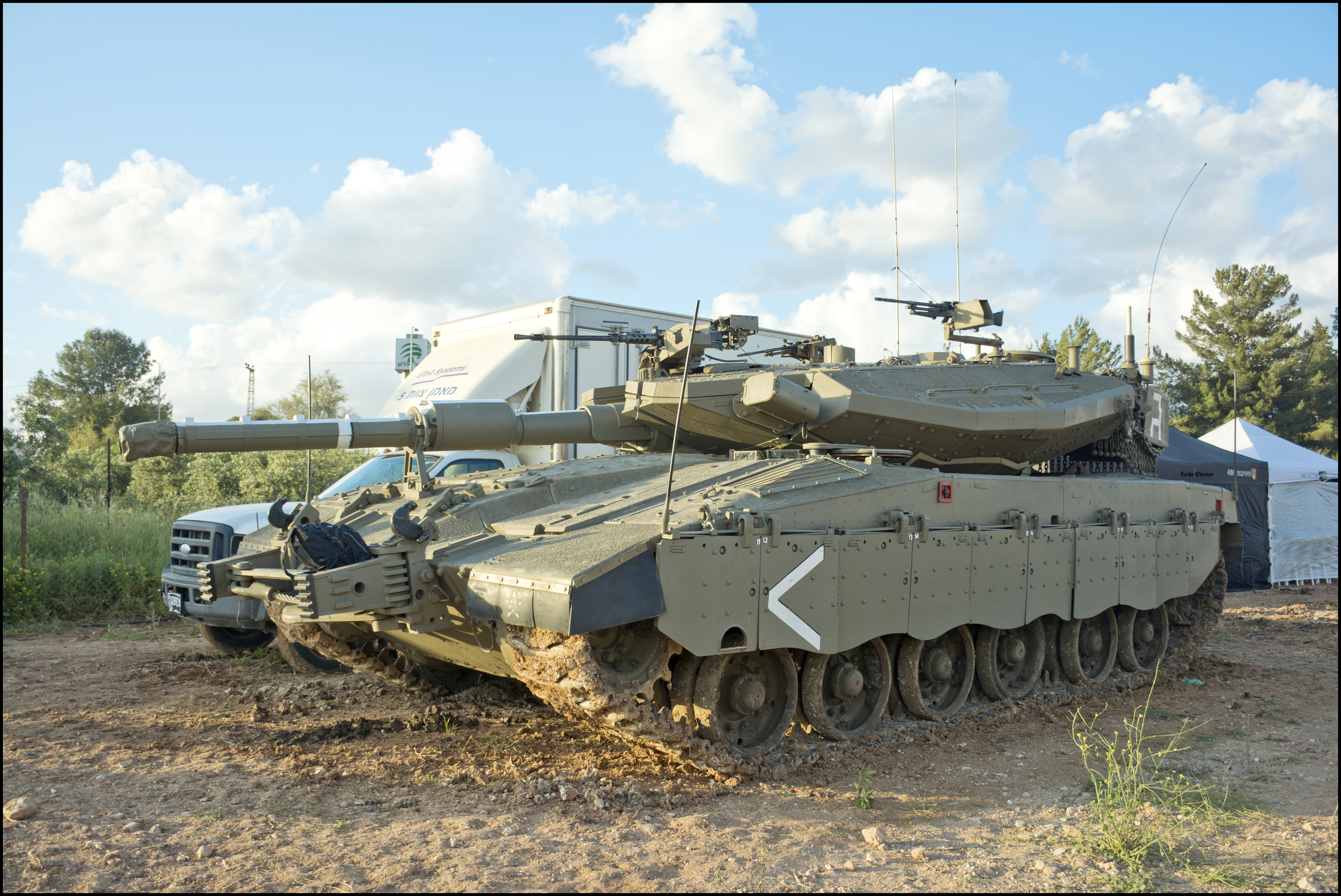
Merkava Mk 3D Baz with LIC upgrades

These are Merkava Mark 3 BAZ or Mark 4 tanks, converted for urban warfare. The LIC designation stands for "low intensity conflict", underlining its emphasis on counter-insurgency, street-to-street inner-city asymmetrical type warfare of the 21st century.

The Merkava is equipped with a turret 12.7 mm caliber coaxial machine gun, which enables the crew to lay down fairly heavy cover fire without using the main gun (which is relatively ineffective against individual enemy combatants). Like the new remote-operated weapon station, the coaxial machine-gun is fired from inside the tank without exposing the crew to small-arms fire and snipers.

The most sensitive areas of a tank, its optics, exhaust ports and ventilators, are all protected by a newly developed high-strength metal mesh to prevent explosive charges being planted there.

Rubber whip pole-markers with LED tips and a driver's rear-facing camera have been installed to improve navigation and maneuverability in an urban environment by day or by night.

=== Merkava Tankbulance ===
Some Merkava tanks are fitted with full medical and ambulance abilities while retaining their armament (but carrying less ammunition than the standard tank, having both ammunition racks in the rear removed). The cabin area is converted for carrying injured personnel and includes two stretchers and life support medical station systems supplemented by a full medical team complement to operate under combat conditions with a Merkava battalion. The vehicle retains its rear door to facilitate evacuation under fire, and can provide cover-fire/fire-support to infantry.

The "tankbulance" is not an unarmed ambulance and consequently is not protected by the Geneva Convention's provisions regarding ambulances, but it is far less vulnerable to accidental or deliberate fire than an ambulance or armored personnel carrier.

=== Merkava IFV Namer ===
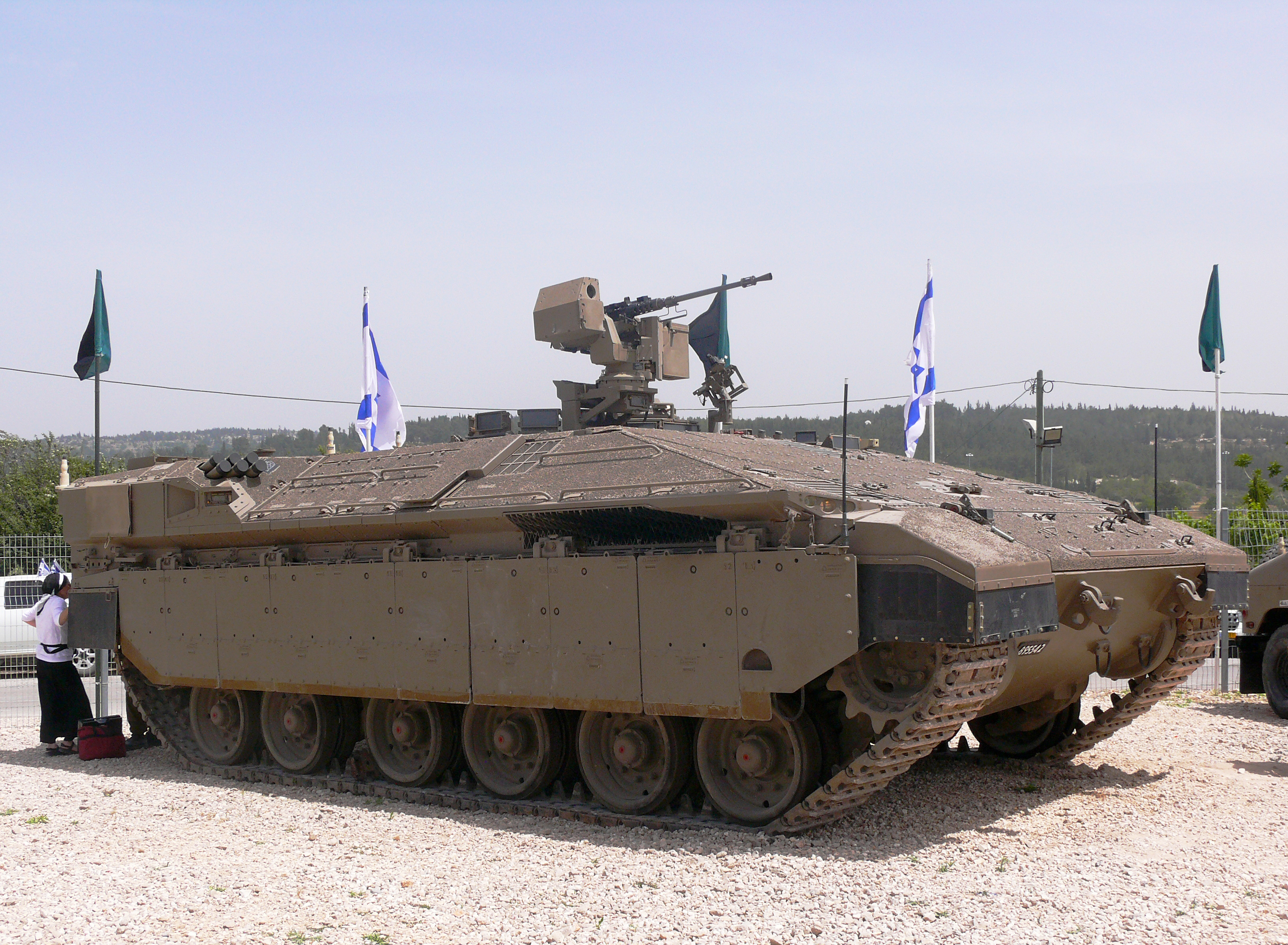
Namer in Yad La-Shiryon 62nd Independence Day exhibition

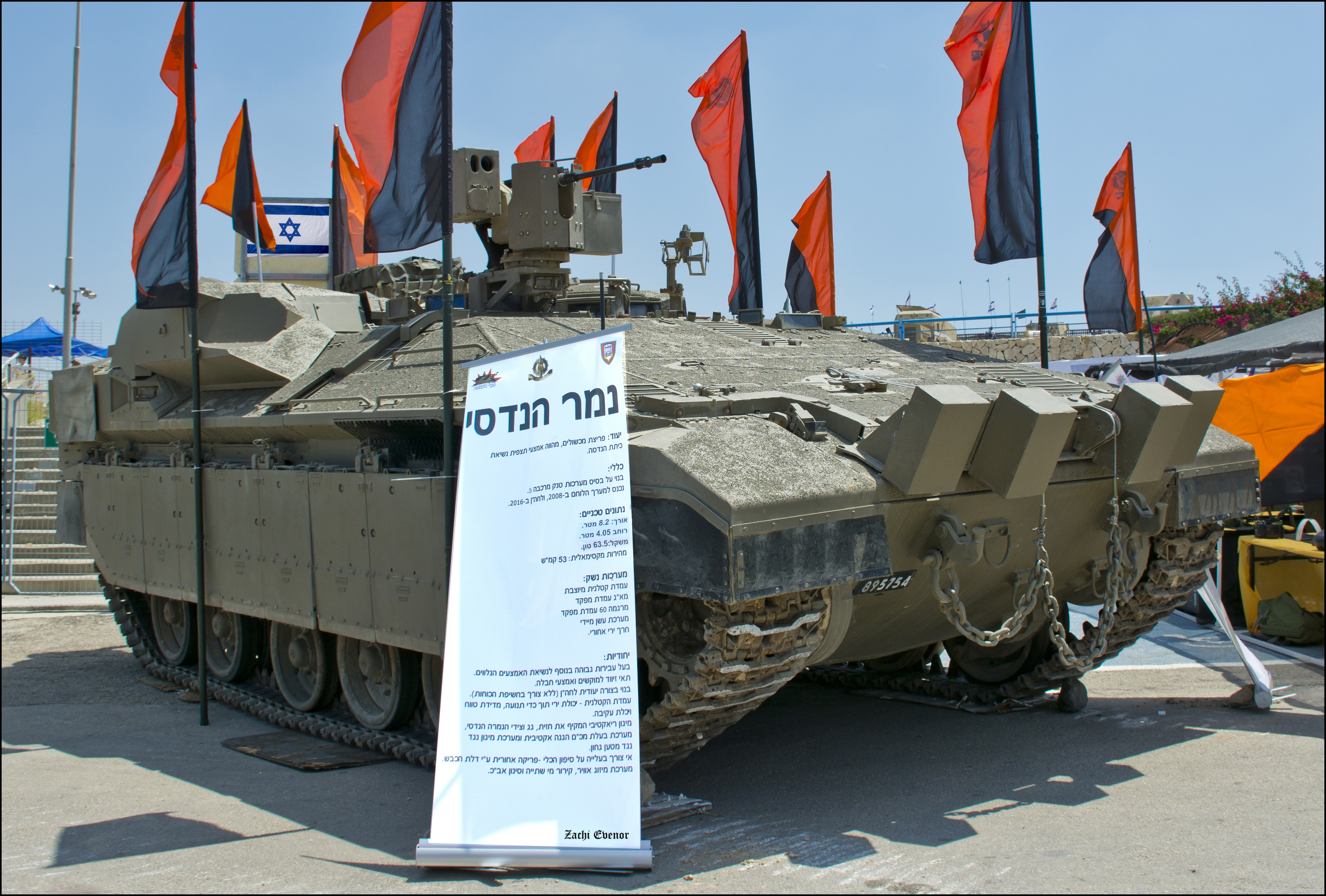
Namer CEV in Yad La-Shiryon 68th Independence Day exhibition

Namer (Hebrew: leopard, which is also an abbreviation of Nagmash (APC) Merkava"), is an infantry fighting vehicle based on the Merkava Mark 4 chassis. In service since 2008, the vehicle was initially called Nemmera (Hebrew: leopardess), but later renamed to Namer.

Namer is equipped with a Samson Remote Controlled Weapon Station (RCWS) armed with either a .50 M2 Browning Heavy Machinegun or a Mk 19 Automatic Grenade Launcher. It also has a 7.62 mm MAG machine gun, 60 mm mortar and smoke grenades. Like the Merkava Mark 4, it is optimized for high level of crew survival on the battlefield. The Namer has a three-man crew (commander, driver, and RCWS gunner) and may carry up to nine infantrymen and a stretcher. An ambulance variant can carry two casualties on stretchers and medical equipment.

The Golani Brigade used two Namer IFVs during Operation Cast Lead. During Operation Protective Edge more than 20 vehicles were operated with great success and post operation analysis recommended procuring more of them.

=== Merkava ARV Nemmera ===
The Merkava armored recovery vehicle initially called Namer (Hebrew: leopard), but subsequently renamed Nemmera (Hebrew: leopardess) is an armored recovery vehicle based on a Merkava Mark 3 or 4 chassis. It can tow disabled tanks and carries a complete Merkava back-up power pack that can be changed in the field in under 90 minutes.

=== Merkava Howitzer Sholef ===
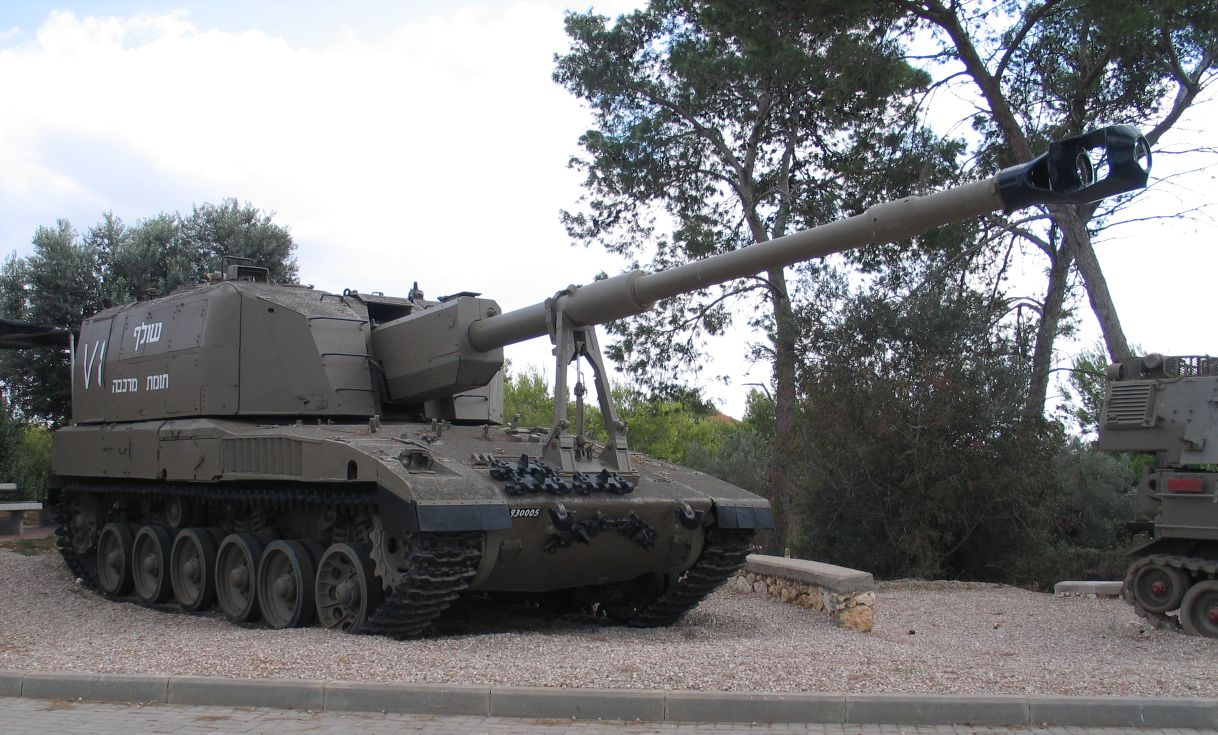
Sholef in Beit ha-Totchan, Zikhron Ya'akov, Israel.

Two prototypes of Sholef ("Slammer", Hebrew slang for "Gunslinger") 155 mm self-propelled howitzer with an automatic loading system were built by Soltam in 1984–86. The 45-tonne vehicle had a long 155 mm gun barrel giving a range of 45+ km. Using GPS, inertial navigation, and an internal fire control computer, it was also capable of direct fire while on the move. It never entered production.

The Slammer is a heavily armored artillery gun mounted on a modified Merkava Mk 1 chassis. Many of these vehicles are Merkava Mk 1 that were retired after the Merkava Mk 2 and Merkava Mk 3 came into service. The Slammer has a long 52-caliber gun barrel that allows +10% range. Reload speed may be decreased to 1 for one minute every 10 minutes through use of an automatic loader. Ammunition racks are large. The Slammer is ready for autonomous operation (without an FDC) if the target's location is known within 15 seconds of a halt, using GPS, inertial navigation, and an internal fire control computer.

The Slammer 155 mm self-propelled howitzer is based on a modified Merkava MBT chassis fitted with a new welded steel turret, designed by Soltam Systems.

Development commenced in the 1970s. The project was considered of high national priority and incorporated the newest technological developments. Instead the Israeli Defense Forces selected an upgraded version of American M109 howitzer.

The Sholef's chassis, aside from a few minor modifications, is identical to that of the Merkava Mk 3. The glacis plate is unchanged, except for the addition of a support bracket for the gun turret, which is folded down when not in use. As such, the Sholef and Merkava series share a large percentage of common components. The front-left side of the chassis has a prominent exhaust louver, along with a much smaller port just in front of it; the exact function of this port is uncertain, though the soot seen around it in photos of the Sholef suggests it may be a new or additional exhaust port, or perhaps an outlet for a smoke generator.

The Sholef can be ready to fire only 15 seconds after coming to a complete stop, and fire three projectiles in only 15 seconds. It is compatible with standard NATO 155 mm ammunition, and a total of 75 projectiles can be stowed in one Sholef, 60 of which are ready for combat.

The Sholef's 155 mm/52 gun is an original design created by Soltam, though it bears a resemblance to South Africa's G5 howitzer. It has a fume extractor and muzzle brake, and is kept stationary by a travel lock while the vehicle is on the move. This gun has a maximum rate of fire of 9 rounds/min, and a range in excess of 40,000 m when firing an ERFB-BB round. Though loaded automatically, the gun may be cycled and fire manually if the need arises. While the gun is normally carried by a travel lock as with most other self-propelled howitzers while the Sholef is on the move, the weapon is stabilized and can actually be used for direct-fire while the vehicle is moving, giving it much greater self-defense ability than most other vehicles of its type.

A crew of four is required to fully operate the Sholef. Air conditioning and heating for the crew are provided, as is a ration heater.

The hull has the same ballistic protection as the Merkava Mk.III. The armor on the turret is sufficient to defeat small arms fire, shell splinters, blast overpressure, and most heavy machine gun rounds. The armor is augmented by spall liners, and the same overpressure NBC system as the Merkava Mk.III is fitted. There is also a back-up collective NBC system.

The running gear consists of six unevenly spaced rubber-tired roadwheels on each side, and five return rollers, the second from the rear of which is noticeably larger than the others. The drive sprocket is forward, and the conspicuously spoked idler is rear. These may be partially obscured by track skirts, of which the Merkava Mk.III has ten panels, with a wavering underside, and little coverage of the sprocket or idler.

The ordnance is fitted with a fume extractor and a double-baffle muzzle brake. When travelling, the ordnance is held in position by a travel lock that is mounted on the forward part of the glacis plate and this is remotely operated from the crew compartment.

Firing an ERFB-BB projectile, the 155 mm 52 calibre ordnance has a maximum range of 40,000+ m.

The 155 mm 52 calibre ordnance and recoil system is of the companies well-proven type already used in its towed weapons. The breech block assembly is of the semi-automatic wedge type that contains an automatic primer feeding system that enables manual reloading of the primer without opening the breech. Turret traverse and weapon elevation is hydraulic, with manual controls for emergency use.

A maximum rate of fire of 9 rounds/min can be achieved due to the automatic computerised loading system, and a burst rate of fire of three rounds in 15 seconds.

The high rate of fire can be achieved using the onboard ammunition supply or from ground-piled ammunition. The loading cycle is operated by two turret crewmen only, with the commander operating the computer and charge loader.

The automatic loader has five main subsystems: projectile storage system; projectile transfer system; loading tray with flick rammer; charge loading tray and elevator for external charge supply; and projectile elevator for reloading the external storage or directly loading the gun.

The internal projectile storage contains 60 projectiles ready for automatic loading with the remaining 15 stored in other locations. The system enables the handling of all kinds of projectiles in use without any adaptation.

Charge loading is accomplished manually using a loading tray with the ignition primer being inserted automatically. All systems have a manual back-up so that, in the case of failure, the loading system may be operated partly or completely manually by only three crewmen, so allowing a continuous firing rate of 4 rounds/min.

The computer also controls the functioning of the gun. The Loader Control System (LCS) consists of five main units:

1. The commander's panel provides the means for the commander to control the automatic loader and has a dedicated keyboard and supporting electronic circuits
2. The Central Control Unit (CCU) is based on the Intel 80286 and produces all of the system's logic equations. The unit transfers commands through the serial communications (RS-422) to the computerised units and controls the display on the commander's panel
3. The Terminal Units (TUs) are based on the 8031 controller for purposes of independent control of the drive elements according to a functionally determined division. With the assistance of the terminal unit, a local mode can also be used in working with selected elements
4. For guiding operators and making round identification and fusing, the Operator's Panel (OP) includes a liquid-crystal display with fixed instructions and one dot matrix line.
5. The Loader Keyboard Panel (LKP) includes breech block closing switch, fire and local activation of the trays.

The main operational roles are: firing from internal storage; firing for elevator – ground-piled ammunition; loading from elevator – external pile; synthesising fire programs; unloading; manual firing; identification; and fusing and checks.

Standard equipment includes an NBC system of the overpressure type and an inertial navigation and aiming system designed for autonomous operations.

According to Soltam Systems, the 155 mm/52 caliber ordnance and automatic loader, or parts of the system, could be installed in other self-propelled artillery systems and used to upgrade other self-propelled systems such as the US-designed and built 155 mm M109 and M44.

== Successor (Carmel) ==
On July 14, 2011, The Jerusalem Post reported that the IDF had begun developing a successor for the Merkava series of tanks. The development was begun in part by the arrival of the Trophy active protection system. With the system's ability to intercept threats at a stand-off distance, there was a review of the need for vehicles like the Merkava to have thick, heavy layers of armor.

The Merkava Tank Planning Directorate set up a team to study principles for a future tank and present ideas for an armored fighting vehicle to provide mobile firepower on a future battlefield. The team reviewed basic design principles including lessening its weight, armor thickness compared to an APS to intercept anti-tank threats, reducing the crew size, and the type of main gun. Horsepower abilities and heavy and light track systems compared to a wheeled chassis were also considered. With future battlefield condition developments affecting design features, the vehicle may not be considered a "tank" in the traditional sense.

By July 2012, details began to emerge of considerations for developing technologies for the new design. One possibility is the replacement of the traditional main gun with a laser cannon or an electromagnetic cannon. Other improvements could include a hybrid-electric engine and a reduced crew of two. The goals of the new tank are to make it faster, better protected, more interoperable and lethal than the prior Merkava.

The 65-tonne Merkava is not regarded as useful for missions other than conventional warfare. The Israeli Army Armored Corps wants a lighter and highly mobile vehicle for rapid-response and urban warfare situations that can fill multiple roles. In 2012, the Defense Ministry drafted a program for development of a new family of light armored vehicles called Rakiya (Heavens), a Hebrew acronym for "future manned combat vehicle" (FMCV). The FMCV is planned to weigh 35 tonnes and have sufficient armor and weapons for both urban and conventional military operations. Instead of one multi-mission chassis, separate vehicles in distinct variants will perform different roles with all vehicles using common components. Vehicles are likely to be wheeled to maneuver in urban environments and move troops and equipment around in built-up areas.

While the FMCV will be a fifth-generation vehicle as a follow-on to the Merkava IV, it will not be a replacement for the tank. The Merkava and Namer heavy tracked vehicles will remain in service for decades, while FMCV vehicles are to address entirely different operational requirements.

Although the program seems similar to the American Future Combat Systems effort, which failed to produce a family of rapidly deployable lightweight ground vehicles, program officials say they learned from the American experience and that the FMCV was more focused and driven by simpler and more reasonable requirements based on cost considerations.

Officials expect requirements for a range of configurations for FMCV light armored vehicles to be approved in 2014 and solicited to Israeli and American companies. The IDF hoped the FMCV family of vehicles would be operational by 2020. The program was named Carmel around 2016, and three contractors, Elbit, Rafael and Israel Aerospace Industries (IAI), were to produce three prototypes by 2019.

On August 4, 2019, all three prototypes were tested. IAI's model was based on the company's existing unmanned, autonomous drone platforms, operated by a controller from the Xbox video game system; the tank had a large panoramic display, was able to assist the crew members in identifying targets and selecting weapons, and could drive itself in some terrains.

Elbit's model used its Iron Vision helmets, which works with cameras and sensors on the outside of the tank to give the soldiers inside a 360-degree field of vision. It is a variation on a similar helmet that the company created for the F-35 fighter jet. A number of other autonomous and AI systems also assist the soldiers inside in identifying targets and general decision-making.

Rafael's prototype used a transparent cockpit design that also gave the two soldiers inside a 360-degree field of view. Its augmented reality systems allowed the crew members to quickly see targets, friendly forces and important locations. The Rafael tank also had "an autonomous mission support system, for autonomous mission planning, driving, and simultaneous operation of all vehicle weapon systems, all based on combat artificial intelligence capabilities".

In 2021, Israel Aerospace Industries (IAI) was selected to lead the next phase of Carmel's development.

== Export ==
In May 2012, Israel offered procurement of Merkava IV tanks to the Colombian Army. The sale would include 25–40 tanks at an approximate cost of $4.5 million each, and several Namer APCs. With the threat of the expanding Venezuelan military, it would strengthen Colombian armored forces against Venezuelan T-72 tanks.

In 2014, Israel reported that exports of the Mk 4 had begun; the purchasing country's name was not disclosed for security reasons.

In July 2022, the armoured vehicle-launched bridge (AVLB) variant of the Merkava 4 called the Tagash was delivered to the Philippine Army as part of a government-to-government deal with Israel.

== Operators ==
A map of operators of the Merkava or its variants

=== Current operators ===
Israel

- Israeli Ground Forces

Philippines

- Philippine Army: Merkava AVLB armoured vehicle-launcher bridge.

=== Potential operators ===
- Cyprus: Discussing the purchase of second-hand Merkava Mark 3s in 2023. Cyprus was later able to buy US weapons, and it was speculated in 2025 that US M1 Abrams might be preferred. Also, due to the conflict between Israel and Hamas, Israeli arms exports were halted, causing concerns in Nicosia about future spare parts availability.

== Bibliography ==
- Cordesman, Anthony H; Sullivan, William D (2007). Lessons of the 2006 Israeli-Hezbollah War. CSIS.
- Gelbart, Marsh (2005). Merkava: A History of Israel's Main Battle Tank Der Kampfpanzer der Israelischen Armee. Tankograd Publishing.
