= Xin Lu =

Chinese and British oncologist

Xin Lu FRS
- Alma mater: University College London; Peking Union Medical College; Sichuan University
- Works: ASPP proteins specifically stimulate the apoptotic function of p53
- Awards: Fellow of the Academy of Medical Sciences (2013); EMBO Membership; Fellow of the Royal Society (2020, 2020)
- Website: www.ndm.ox.ac.uk/principal-investigators/researcher/xin-lu
- Academic career
- Institutions: Ludwig Cancer Research; University of Oxford; University College London (2004–2007); Imperial College London (2000–2004); Imperial College London (1996–2000); Imperial College London (1993–1996); University of Dundee (1991–1993)
- Thesis: A study of intermediate filament formation using retrovirus-mediated gene transfer
- Doctoral advisor: Ellen Lane

Xin Lu FRS is a professor of Cancer Biology and Director of the Ludwig Institute for Cancer Research at the University of Oxford. She is known for her discovery of and research on the ASPP family of proteins.

== Education ==
Xin Lu completed her undergraduate education in Biochemistry at Sichuan University in 1982 and her master's degree in Cell and Molecular Biology at the Cancer Institute, Peking Union Medical College & Chinese Academy of Medical Sciences in 1985. She moved to University College London (UCL) to complete her PhD studies supervised by Birgit Lane, and published her thesis A study of intermediate filament formation using retrovirus-mediated gene transfer in 1991.

== Research and career ==
In 1993, after a short postdoc with David Lane at Dundee University, she joined the Ludwig Institute for Cancer Research (LICR), which was based at St Mary's Hospital, Imperial College London and set up her own research group. In 2004 Lu was appointed Director of Research at Ludwig Institute for Cancer Research London Branch, and Professor of Cancer Biology at University College London. In 2007 she moved the institute to Oxford.

== Honours and awards ==
- Fellow of the Royal Society (2020)
- Fellow of the Academy of Medical Sciences (2013)
- Member of the Academia Europaea (2022)
- Member of the European Molecular Biology Organization (2011)
- Fellow of the Royal Society of Biology (2011–2022)
- Fellow of the Royal College of Pathologists (2007–2022)

== Notable works ==
Lu, X (1993). "Differential induction of transcriptionally active p53 following UV or lonizing radiation: Defects in chromosome instability syndromes?". Cell. 75 (4): 765–778. doi:10.1016/0092-8674(93)90496-d. PMID 8242748.

Hsieh, Jung-Kuang; Chan, Florence S.G; O’Connor, Daniel J; Mittnacht, Sibylle; Zhong, Shan; Lu, Xin (1999). "RB Regulates the Stability and the Apoptotic Function of p53 via MDM2". Molecular Cell. 3 (2): 181–193. doi:10.1016/s1097-2765(00)80309-3. PMID 10078201.

Samuels-Lev, Yardena; O'Connor, Daniel J.; Bergamaschi, Daniele; Trigiante, Giuseppe; Hsieh, Jung-Kuang; Zhong, Shan; Campargue, Isabelle; Naumovski, Louie; Crook, Tim (2001). "ASPP Proteins Specifically Stimulate the Apoptotic Function of p53". Molecular Cell. 8 (4): 781–794. doi:10.1016/s1097-2765(01)00367-7. PMID 11684014.

Lu, Min; Zak, Jaroslav; Chen, Shuo; Sanchez-Pulido, Luis; Severson, David T.; Endicott, Jane; Ponting, Chris P.; Schofield, Christopher J.; Lu, Xin (2014). "A Code for RanGDP Binding in Ankyrin Repeats Defines a Nuclear Import Pathway". Cell. 157 (5): 1130–1145. doi:10.1016/j.cell.2014.05.006. PMID 24855949.

Bergamaschi, Daniele; Samuels, Yardena; O'Neil, Nigel J.; Trigiante, Giuseppe; Crook, Tim; Hsieh, Jung-Kuang; O'Connor, Daniel J.; Zhong, Shan; Campargue, Isabelle (2003). "iASPP oncoprotein is a key inhibitor of p53 conserved from worm to human". Nature Genetics. 33 (2): 162–167. doi:10.1038/ng1070. ISSN 1546-1718. PMID 12524540. S2CID 22841392.

Notari, Mario; Hu, Ying; Sutendra, Gopinath; Dedeić, Zinaida; Lu, Min; Dupays, Laurent; Yavari, Arash; Carr, Carolyn A.; Zhong, Shan (2015-03-03). "iASPP, a previously unidentified regulator of desmosomes, prevents arrhythmogenic right ventricular cardiomyopathy (ARVC)-induced sudden death". Proceedings of the National Academy of Sciences. 112 (9): E973–E981. Bibcode:2015PNAS..112E.973N. doi:10.1073/pnas.1408111112. PMC 4352828. PMID 25691752.

Wang, Yihua; Bu, Fangfang; Royer, Christophe; Serres, Sébastien; Larkin, James R.; Soto, Manuel Sarmiento; Sibson, Nicola R.; Salter, Victoria; Fritzsche, Florian (2014). "ASPP2 controls epithelial plasticity and inhibits metastasis through β-catenin-dependent regulation of ZEB1". Nature Cell Biology. 16 (11): 1092–1104. doi:10.1038/ncb3050. ISSN 1476-4679. PMID 25344754. S2CID 20735236.

Turnquist, Casmir; Wang, Yihua; Severson, David T.; Zhong, Shan; Sun, Bin; Ma, Jingyi; Constantinescu, Stefan N.; Ansorge, Olaf; Stolp, Helen B. (2014-07-08). "STAT1-induced ASPP2 transcription identifies a link between neuroinflammation, cell polarity, and tumor suppression". Proceedings of the National Academy of Sciences. 111 (27): 9834–9839. Bibcode:2014PNAS..111.9834T. doi:10.1073/pnas.1407898111. PMC 4103354. PMID 24958857.

Lu, Min; Breyssens, Hilde; Salter, Victoria; Zhong, Shan; Hu, Ying; Baer, Caroline; Ratnayaka, Indrika; Sullivan, Alex; Brown, Nicholas R. (2013). "Restoring p53 Function in Human Melanoma Cells by Inhibiting MDM2 and Cyclin B1/CDK1-Phosphorylated Nuclear iASPP". Cancer Cell. 23 (5): 618–633. doi:10.1016/j.ccr.2013.03.013. PMID 23623661.

Wang, Yihua; Wang, Xiao Dan; Lapi, Eleonora; Sullivan, Alexandra; Jia, Wei; He, You-Wen; Ratnayaka, Indrika; Zhong, Shan; Goldin, Robert D. (2012-08-14). "Autophagic activity dictates the cellular response to oncogenic RAS". Proceedings of the National Academy of Sciences. 109 (33): 13325–13330. Bibcode:2012PNAS..10913325W. doi:10.1073/pnas.1120193109. PMC 3421174. PMID 22847423.

Notari, Mario; Hu, Ying; Koch, Sofia; Lu, Min; Ratnayaka, Indrika; Zhong, Shan; Baer, Caroline; Pagotto, Anna; Goldin, Robert (2011-10-04). "Inhibitor of apoptosis-stimulating protein of p53 (iASPP) prevents senescence and is required for epithelial stratification". Proceedings of the National Academy of Sciences. 108 (40): 16645–16650. Bibcode:2011PNAS..10816645N. doi:10.1073/pnas.1102292108. PMC 3189025. PMID 21930934.

Slee, Elizabeth A.; Benassi, Barbara; Goldin, Robert; Zhong, Shan; Ratnayaka, Indrika; Blandino, Giovanni; Lu, Xin (2010-11-09). "Phosphorylation of Ser312 contributes to tumor suppression by p53 in vivo". Proceedings of the National Academy of Sciences. 107 (45): 19479–19484. Bibcode:2010PNAS..10719479S. doi:10.1073/pnas.1005165107. PMC 2984175. PMID 20962274.
