= Asaf Sagiv =

Film Score Composer

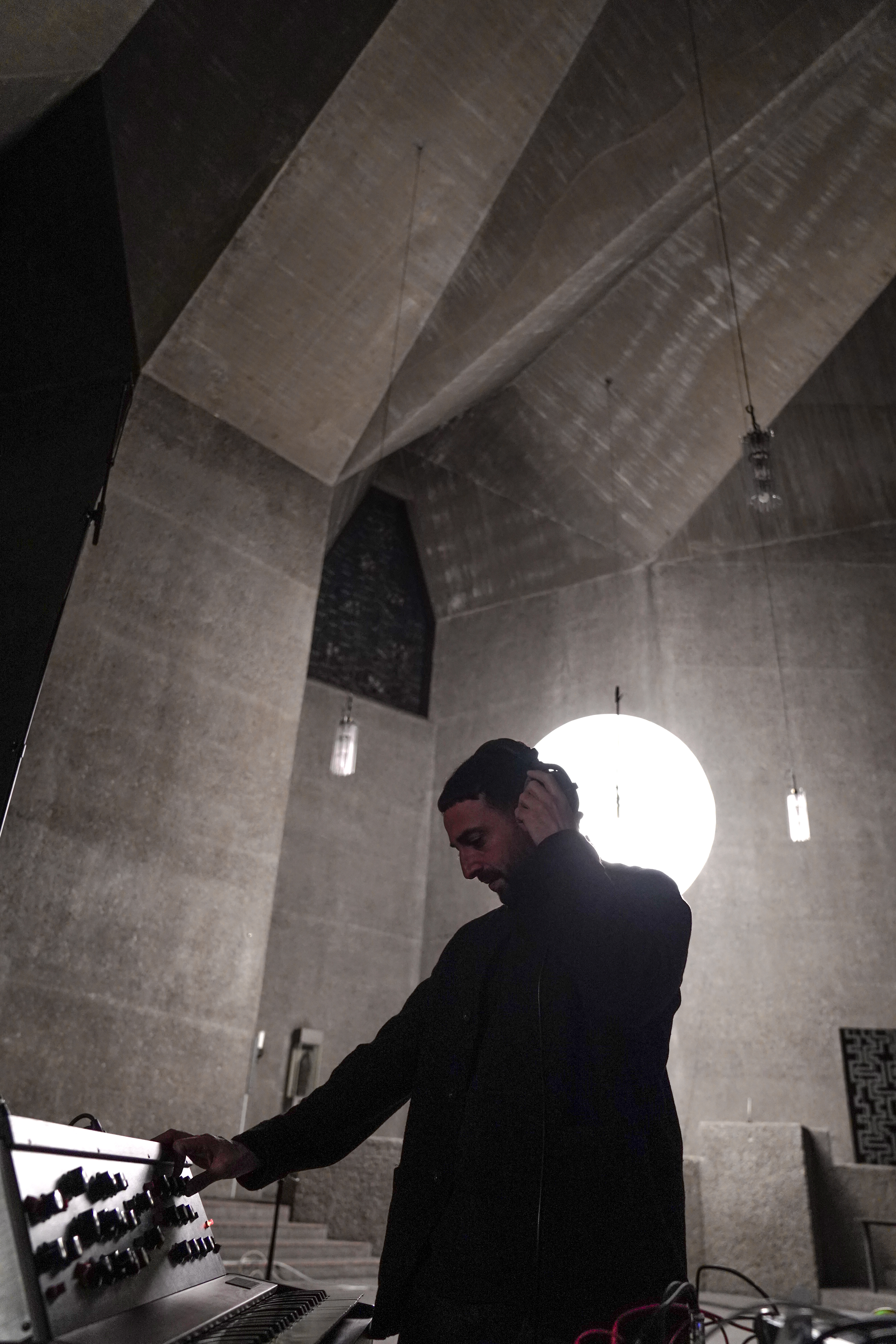
- Sagiv in Cologne

Background information
- Born: Asaf Sagiv; 29 July 1982; Tel Hashomer, Israel
- Occupations: Composer; producer
- Instruments: Piano; synthesizer; guitar
- Years active: 2006–present
- Labels: Universal Music Group; Varèse Sarabande
- Website: asafsagiv.com

Asaf Sagiv (/ˈɑːsəf/; Hebrew: אָסָף שַׂגִּיב; born 29 July 1982) is a Los Angeles based composer who writes music for film, television, contemporary dance and theater. His work combines orchestral writing with minimalistic contemporary electronic elements.

Some of his works in film include Last Summer, Drugs and the Emmy Award nominated Netflix Original ReMastered: Who Shot the Sheriff? directed by Academy Award-nominated director Kief Davidson.

He spent his early life growing up in Israel, playing guitar and keys and studying composition, and later relocated to the US.

== Early life and career ==
Asaf was born on 29 July 1982 in Tel HaShomer, Israel to Ovadia Sagiv, an aerospace engineer and inventor, and Osnat (Sabina) Perelman, daughter of the Holocaust survivors Sigmund and Barbara Perelman who fled Poland of World War II.

He grew up with his parents and three sisters in a quiet moshav called Ganot. He learned the guitar from the age of 12 and taught himself how to play the piano. Asaf began writing music at a young age and wrote his first orchestral symphonic piece when he was 15. At some point Asaf took a momentary pause from music and taught himself how to paint by looking at the Old Masters works.

Asaf started his musical career in the early 2000s as the musical director and commander of the Air Force Ensemble and Choir as part of his mandatory service. During this time he also started working as a session guitarist and producer for various bands and artists. It was around that period that Asaf experimented with a wide range of musical styles, shaping his own sound.

In 2004 Asaf moved to Boston. There he collaborated with contemporary dance company Harvard-Radcliffe Modern Dance Company, as well as with playwright Rebecca Bella Wangh for the Boston Playwrights' Theatre. He attended Berklee College of Music on a scholarship, studying film scoring and orchestration and graduating quickly in 2007 with highest honors of Summa cum laude. He was then invited to go to Los Angeles by the Society of Composers & Lyricists, and intern their Mentor Program in Fall 2007. That same week Asaf moved to California where he started writing and producing music for film and tv.

In 2010 he formed the Indie Rock band Water Knot and led their EP tour of Europe and the US, culminating at Bonnaroo Festival 2012 headlining Radiohead, Bon Iver and Red Hot Chili Peppers. Following that he settled in London, UK for a couple of years. London saw Asaf return to scoring, with his second time collaborating with Italian director Leonardo Guerra Seragnoli on the feature drama Last Summer starring Rinko Kikuchi. The film premiered at Rome International Film Festival and won the AITS Award.

Asaf's music was featured in Lionsgate's Misconduct, starring Anthony Hopkins and Al Pacino and was released in 2016 on the Soundtrack album under Varèse Sarabande.

In 2018, Asaf was approached by Foxhound to write the music for their J. K. Simmons narrated documentary film 'Drugs'. He started to work on the score while still living in London, and completed the score upon his return to Los Angeles. Later on that year he contributed music for the feature drama Like Me Back. The soundtrack featured songs from the artists Beck and Charlotte Gainsbourg. Shortly after, Asaf was asked to write the score for the Netflix Original Who Shot The Sheriff. The show was nominated an Emmy Award for Outstanding Arts & Culture Documentary in 2019.

In 2020, Asaf co-composed the score for the feature film Continue. In the following years he also contributed original music for the Netflix No.1 hit show Outer Banks and for NBC's Council of Dads produced by Jerry Bruckheimer.

In 2023, the animated short film Black Slide, scored by Asaf was shortlisted for an Academy Award for the 95th Academy Awards.

== Filmography ==
=== Film ===
Year	Film	Director	Notes
2008	Alfred	Leonardo Guerra Seràgnoli	
2009	A Thousand Suns	Stephen Marshall	
2009	The Center	Leonardo Guerra Seràgnoli	
2009	16 To Life	Becky Smith	
2010	Rachel	Leonardo Guerra Seràgnoli	Jena Malone
2011	Will	Leonardo Guerra Seràgnoli	
2013	Homefront	Gary Fleder	
2014	Last Summer	Leonardo Guerra Seràgnoli	Rome international Film Festival Best Feature Film Award nominee, received A.I.T.S Best Sound
2016	Misconduct	Shintaro Shimosawa	Released by Lionsgate (writer: "Lust") Anthony Hopkins Al Pacino
2018	Footloose	David Tenenbaum	
2018	The Critic (2019 film)|The Critic	Stella Velon	
2018	ReMastered: Who Shot The Sheriff?	Kief Davidson	Emmy® Nominated for Outstanding Arts & Culture Documentary
2018	Drug$	Jonathan Marshall Thompson	J.K. Simmons
2018	Likemeback	Leonardo Guerra Seràgnoli	(performer: "Every Day") / (writer: "Every Day", "Losing Control", "Moving Forward (Imagine)")
2018	Dreamwisher	Colin Costello	Southern Shorts Award Of Excellence for Individual Achievement In Music
2019	Bread Pudding	Gena Fridman	
2019	Post Mortem	Erynn Baldwin, Nick Kilgor	
2019	Love Never Forgets	Fred Grant	
2020	Crybaby	Gena Fridman	
2020	Continue	Nadine Crocker	co-composed with Haim Mazar
2023	Black Slide	Uri Lotan	Shortlisted Best Animated Short Film for the 95th Academy Awards.

=== Television ===
Year	Film	Director	Notes
2009	The Kids Grow Up	Doug Block	HBO
2016	I Love Bekka & Lucy	Rachael Holder	Warner Bros (performer: "Bubbles") / (writer: "Bubbles")
2017	Lawless Oceans	Karsten von Hoesslin	
2017	Cooper's Treasure	Phil Lott, Ari Mark	Discovery
2017	Cold Case Files	Phil Lott, Ari Mark	
2020	Baghdad Central	Alice Troughton, Ben A. Williams	Hulu
2020	Outer Banks	Jonas Pate, Cherie Nowlan, Valerie Weiss	Netflix credited for composer: additional music
2020	Council of Dads	Jonathan Brown	NBC credited for composer: additional music

== Theater ==
- Zarema: Terroristka by Rebecca Bella Wangh (Boston Playwrights' Theater)
- Romeo & Juliet with Skazi (2010, Israel Geshger Theatre)
- Akimbo Sonata by Rebecca Bella Wangh, London UK

== Contemporary Dance ==
- The Center Harvard-Radcliffe Modern Dance Company with Sonia K.Todorova, Boston (2005)

== Personal life ==
Asaf left Ganot in the early 2000s, living in Boston, and London before settling in Los Angeles, California. He is the youngest of four, with three older sisters.

== Awards ==
- In 2007, Asaf received The Doug Timm Award for Outstanding Musicianship
- In 2019 Asaf won the Southern Shorts Award Of Excellence for Individual Achievement In Music
