= Ellen Lane =

Ellen Birgit Lane is a scientific researcher and academic in the field of human biology. She is the Executive Director of the Institute of Medical Biology, A*STAR, in Singapore, and the Chief Scientist of the Skin Research Institute of Singapore. Her research concerns the function of the epithelial cytoskeleton and its importance in disease.

== Education ==
Lane was a student at Withington Girls' School in Manchester between 1962 and 1969. She went on to study Zoology and Comparative Anatomy at University College London (UCL), where she completed her BSc in 1972, followed by a PhD in 1976. During this time at UCL, Lane developed her interests in epithelial biology.

== Research and career ==
Lane carried out postdoctoral research at Imperial College London between 1975 and 1977, UCL between 1977 and 1978, and Cold Spring Harbor Laboratory, New York, between 1978 and 1980. Lane then joined the Imperial Cancer Research Fund (ICRF, now Cancer Research UK), where she subsequently became a tenured staff member.

In 1990 Lane moved her group from ICRF Clare Hall to the University of Dundee, where she established the CRUK Laboratories, together with her husband David Lane and David Glover. Lane held the Cox Chair of Anatomy and Cell Biology from 1991 to 2009. Lane took sabbatical leave from Dundee in 2005-2007, and worked for A*STAR in Singapore. She then returned to Dundee and helped establish the Division of Molecular Medicine.

In 2009 Lane took up a full-time appointment with A*STAR. She held the position of Executive Director of the Institute of Medical Biology at the Agency until 2018, and continues to work as Chief Scientist in the Institute.

Lane has published over 250 research papers and reviews. She is known internationally for her research on epithelial biology. and has a long-standing interest in the function of the epithelial cytoskeleton and its importance in disease. Her team studies the links between mutations and tissue structure failure in human skin diseases, and have determined the basis of more than 15 distinct inherited genetic skin diseases. Lane hopes that her research will generate new therapies for rare and currently incurable genetic skin diseases such as epidermolysis bullosa.

Lane currently holds Adjunct Professor positions at Yong Loo Lin School of Medicine, NUS, and the Karolinska Institute, Stockholm. She is an Honorary Consultant for the National Skin Centre, Singapore. Lane is also an Honorary Professor at the Living Systems Institute, University of Exeter.

A number of internationally renowned professors and key opinion leaders have been trained and mentored by Lane, including Xin Lu and Irwin McLean. She continues to mentor young scientists and trainees in her laboratory, which she considers to be a great privilege.

=== Honours and awards ===
Lane has been elected a Fellow of the Royal Society of Edinburgh, the Academy of Medical Sciences and the Singapore Academy of Science.
