= Tel HaShomer =

Tel HaShomer תֵּל הַשּׁוֹמֵר
- Neighborhood of Ramat Gan
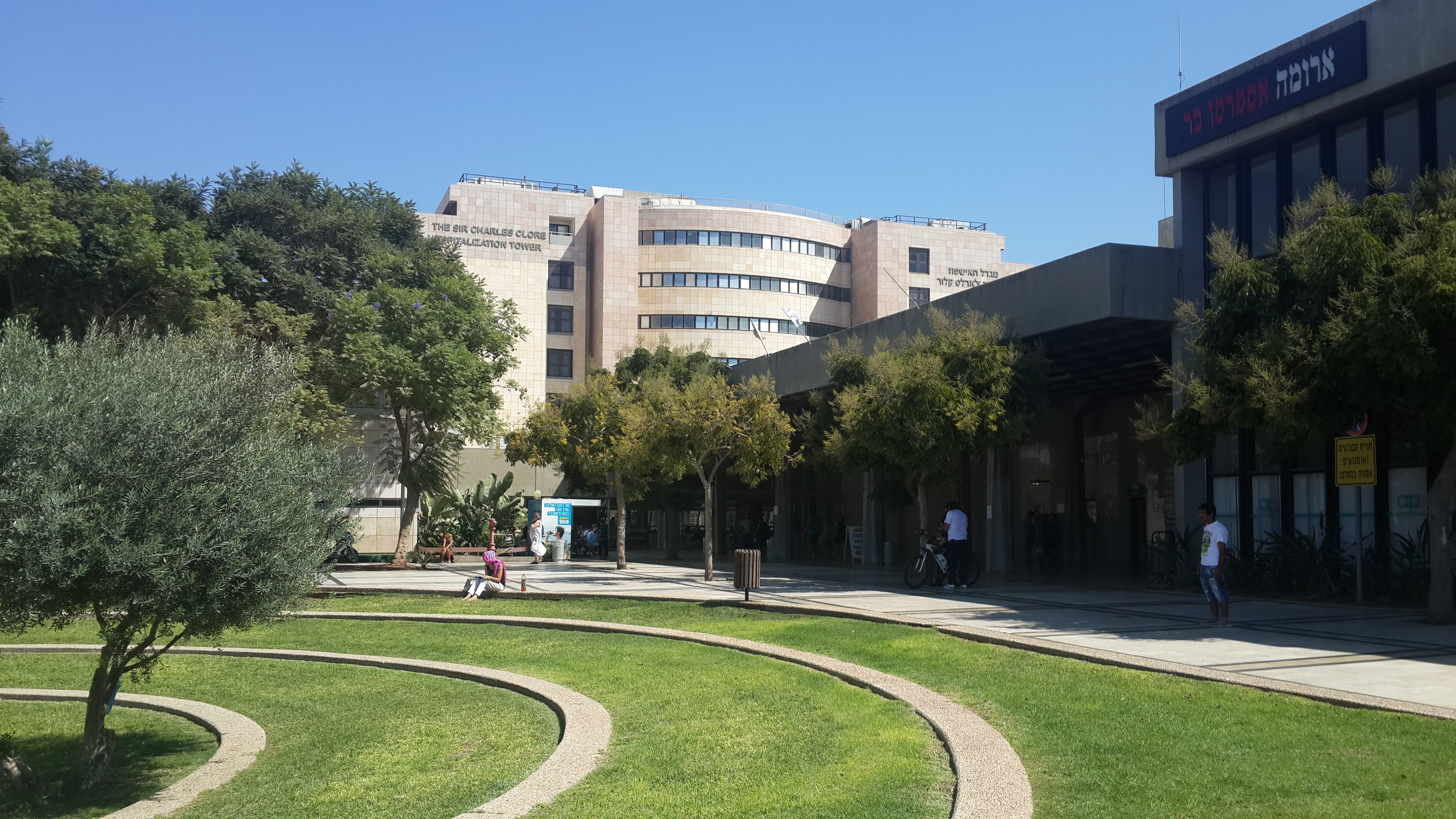

- Location within Central Israel Location within Israel
- Coordinates: 32°2′31.02″N 34°51′22.42″E
- Country: Israel
- City: Ramat Gan
- Established: 1934
- Founder: Moshe and Emil Litvinsky
- Named for: Elhanan Litvinsky (1934, Tel Litvinsky); HaShomer (1948, Tel Hashomer)

Tel HaShomer (Hebrew: תֵּל הַשּׁוֹמֵר, lit. Hill of the Guardsman) or Kiryat Krinitzi (after Avraham Krinitzi) is a neighborhood in Ramat Gan, Israel. It borders Kiryat Ono in the north, Yehud in the east, and Or Yehuda in the south. A major Israel Defense Forces base and the Sheba Medical Center are located in Tel HaShomer.

== History ==
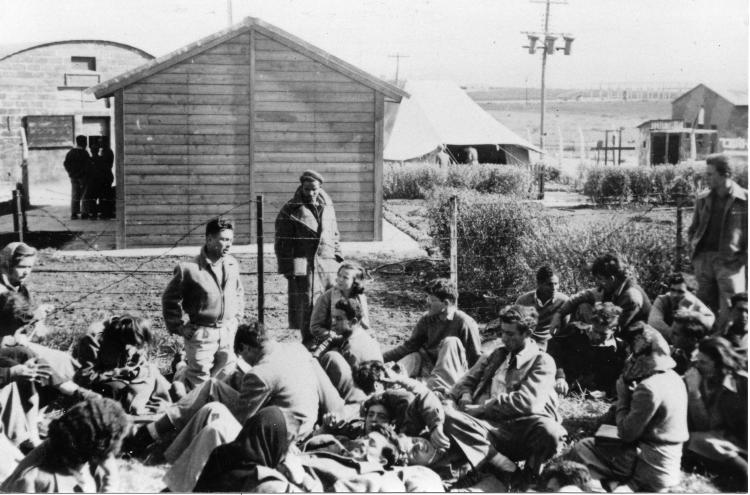
Israeli army camp at Tel Hashomer, 1949

Tel Litvinsky (later Tel Hashomer) was a moshava established in 1934 by Moshe and Emil Litvinsky in memory of their father Elhanan Litvinsky. Moshe Litvinsky was also one of the founders of Ahuzat Bayit (later Tel Aviv). The first inhabitants were Jewish immigrants from Germany and Poland. In 1936, it was noted for its high proportion of academics and doctors. The settlement was planned as a garden city by architect Richard Kaufmann.

During World War II, most of the village lands were expropriated for the construction of a British military base, Tel Litvinsky Camp. The base was of strategic importance because it controlled the Jaffa–Lydda Airport road. It was also used to house Italian prisoners of war.

On November 29, 1947, the Palmach stole explosives and 75 rifles from the camp. Towards the end of the British Mandate for Palestine, Arabs under the command of Hasan Salama began smuggling in arms and personnel disguised as laborers into the camp. The Haganah command saw this as a threat and on April 15, 1948, two companies for the 32nd and 33rd Battalions of the Alexandroni Brigade entered and captured the base. Arab forces counterattacked from al-Khayriyya, Kafr 'Ana, al-'Abbasiyya and Saqiya, but the Jewish forces reinforced and pushed them back to a small salient in the south of the camp, which was captured later in Operation Hametz. The Alexandroni Brigade lost three soldiers, while the Arab losses were estimated at 50.

In 1948, the area was renamed Tel HaShomer after HaShomer, an early Ottoman-period Jewish defense organization.

== Landmarks ==
Located on the grounds of the Israel Defense Forces base (Camp Yaakov Dori) are:

- IDF recruitment office (Lishkat HaGiyus) – processes new draftees
- Meitav, until May 2006 known as Bsis Klita UMiyun (Bakum) – induction base for drafted soldiers, where they receive uniforms, basic gear, etc. and are sent to their units
- Merkava tank factory (7100th Maintenance Center)
- Ground Forces Technology Division (Unit 99)
- Headquarters of Educational Corps, Logistics Corps, Ordnance Corps, Medical Corps and formerly the headquarters of the Military Police

== Medical facilities ==
Adjacent to the base are military and civilian hospitals in adjoining complexes known as the Tel HaShomer Hospital. The civilian hospital is Sheba Medical Center. Magen David Adom has its headquarters and main blood bank on site.

== Notable people ==
- Rutu Modan, Israeli illustrator and comic book artist
- Yardena Samuels, Israeli molecular biologist
- Asaf Sagiv, Israeli composer

== Development plans ==
In September 2015 it was announced that 11,500 housing units would replace the military complex on the site.
