= Yardena Samuels =

Israeli molecular biologist

Yardena Rachel Samuels
- ירדנה רחל סמואלס
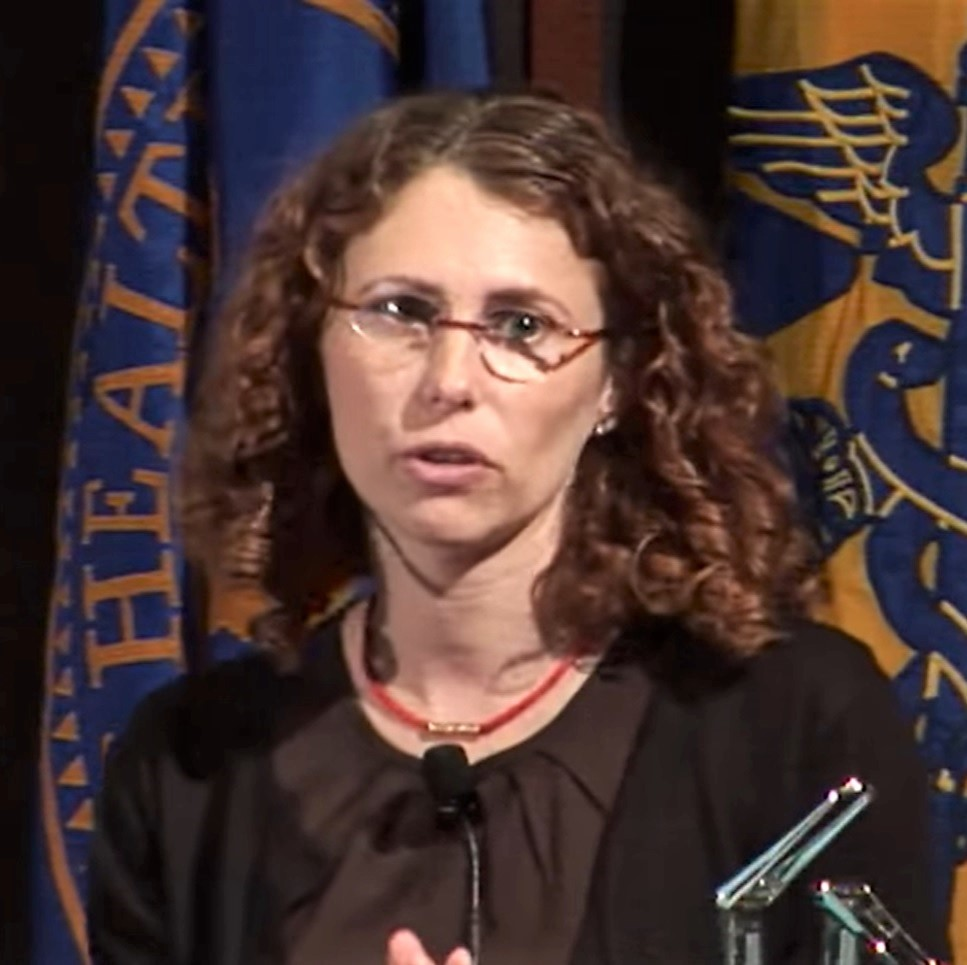
- Samuels in 2011
- Born: Tel Hashomer, Israel
- Education: University of Cambridge; Hebrew University of Jerusalem; Imperial College London
- Scientific career
- Workplaces: Johns Hopkins University; Weizmann Institute of Science
- Thesis: A novel family of proteins that specifically regulates the apoptopic function of P53. (2002)

Yardena Samuels or Samuels-Lev (Hebrew: ירדנה רחל סמואלס) is an Israeli molecular biologist who is the Director of the Ekard Institute for Cancer Diagnosis Research at the Weizmann Institute of Science. Her research considers the genetic mutations of melanoma.

== Early life and education ==
Samuels was born in Tel HaShomer, Israel. She first visited the Weizmann Institute of Science at the age of seventeen, when she attended a summer school at the international summer science institute. Her mother is a diplomat and her father is a Director for International Relations. She was an undergraduate student at University of Cambridge, where she earned a Bachelor's degree in 1993. Samuels moved to the Hebrew University of Jerusalem, where she worked toward an MSc in immunology. She returned to the United Kingdom for graduate studies in molecular cancer biology, during which she was based at the Ludwig Institute for Cancer Research. She moved to Johns Hopkins University as a postdoctoral fellow in Bert Vogelstein's laboratory in 2003. She identified that the gene encoding PI3-Kalpha is mutated in one third of colorectal cancer patients. During this position, she became interested in personalised medicine for cancer treatment.

== Research and career ==
In 2006, Samuels was appointed Assistant Professor at the Cancer Genetics Branch of the National Human Genome Research Institute at the National Institutes of Health. She established a tumour bank of almost 120 normal and tumour tissue samples. The bank allowed her to analyse for mutations in melanomas, as well as offering hope for the identification of new drug targets. She returned to Israel as a researcher in 2012, where she established her own laboratory at the Weizmann Institute of Science. She was made Director of the Weizmann Brazil Tumor Bank. The bank helps scientists identify genes that are associated with tumour growth.

Samuels' research involves the use of DNA sequencing to identify genetic mutations in melanoma. She identified a mutation that is present in one in five of melanoma cases.

== Awards and honours ==
- Elected to the Council of the European Molecular Biology Organization
- European Research Council award
- Alfred Blalock, Young Investigators' Day Award
- Genome Technology’s Top 25 Young Investigators
- Elected Fellow of the European Academy of Cancer Sciences

== Selected publications ==
- Yardena Samuels; Zhenghe Wang; Alberto Bardelli; et al. (23 April 2004). "High frequency of mutations of the PIK3CA gene in human cancers". Science. 304 (5670): 554. doi:10.1126/science.1096502. ISSN 0036-8075. PMID 15016963. Wikidata Q28131776.
- Yardena Samuels; Luis A Diaz; Oleg Schmidt-Kittler; et al. (1 June 2005). "Mutant PIK3CA promotes cell growth and invasion of human cancer cells". Cancer Cell. 7 (6): 561–573. doi:10.1016/j.ccr.2005.05.014. ISSN 1535-6108. PMID 15950905. Wikidata Q40410776.
- Paul F Robbins; Yong-Chen Lu; Mona El-Gamil; et al. (5 May 2013). "Mining exomic sequencing data to identify mutated antigens recognized by adoptively transferred tumor-reactive T cells". Nature medicine. 19 (6): 747–752. doi:10.1038/nm.3161. ISSN 1078-8956. PMC 3757932. PMID 23644516. Wikidata Q30621114.

== Personal life ==
Samuels is married to Ori Lev and has two sons.
