= L-3 Communication Combat Propulsion Systems =

Business unit

L-3 Combat Propulsion Systems, a division of L-3, was formerly a division of General Dynamics Land Systems until L-3 acquired it in 2005. It is located in Muskegon, Michigan. L-3 Combat Propulsion Systems employs over 500 people and was the 4th largest employer in Muskegon County as of 2006.

The company's primary business is in building engines and transmissions. L-3 CPS builds or supplies

- The AVDS-1790 - 12 Cylinder turbocharged diesel engine
- MTU MT883 1500 hp diesel engine
- HMPT-500 Hydromechanical transmission for the Bradley Fighting Vehicle
