= MSR – The Israel Center for Medical Simulation =

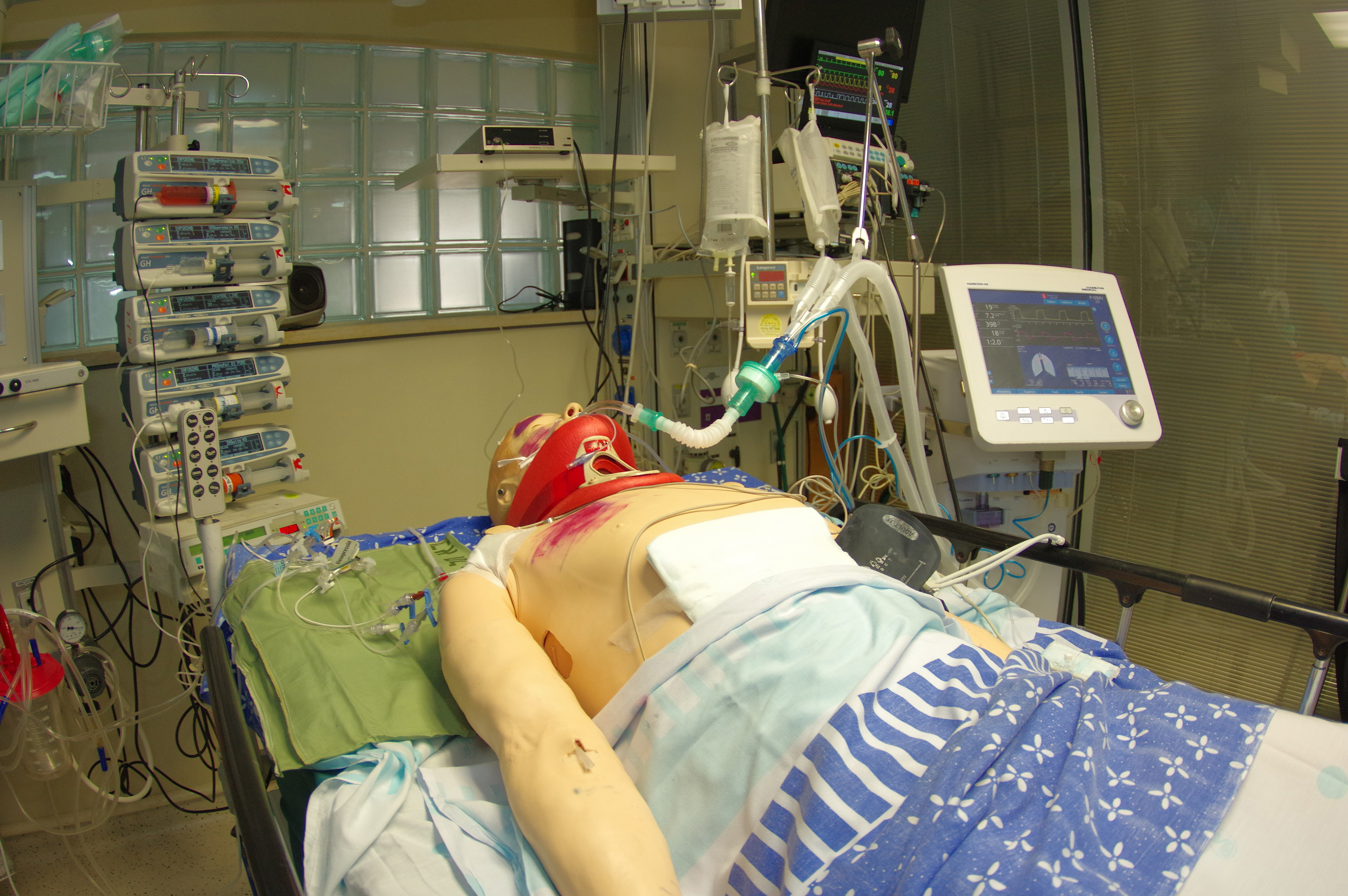
Advanced simulators that breathe, bleed, vomit and respond physiologically to treatment given such as medications and give feedback to procedures such as defibrillation

MSR – The Israel Center for Medical Simulation (Hebrew: מסר - המרכז הארצי לסימולציה רפואית) is Israel's national institute for simulation-based medical education (SBME) and patient safety training. It is located at the Chaim Sheba Medical Center in the Tel HaShomer neighborhood of Ramat Gan, in the Tel Aviv District. MSR is internationally recognized as leader in patient safety simulation-based training.

== Overview ==
The Israel Center for Medical Simulation (MSR) was established at the Chaim Sheba Medical Center in 2001. The center's purpose is to lead a nationwide effort to introduce new standards and innovative approaches to health care training and patient safety education for the benefit of the people of Israel. Reports on patient safety have indicated that health care is far less safe than it should be, and that medical errors are the third cause of death in the US after heart disease and cancer. Simulation based medical education has been recognized as a powerful tool in addressing patient safety and quality-care training.

MSR is under the direction of Professor Amitai Ziv, MD, MHA. He is a veteran combat pilot and flight instructor in the Israeli Air Force where he was first exposed to simulation-based training. Ziv has testified before the U.S. Congress on MSR's medical emergency preparedness programs. He has briefed the Federal Department of Health and Human Services, Office of Homeland Security, the Greater New York Hospital Association, the Conference of Presidents of Major American Jewish Organizations, and has presented at major medical centers including the Mayo Clinic, Harvard University, McGill University, New York Presbyterian Hospital and Cleveland Clinic/Case Western Reserve.

The 2400-square-meter center is designed as a virtual healthcare environment and encompasses the whole spectrum of medical simulation modalities. These include simulated patients (role-playing actors for communication and clinical skills' training), advanced task trainers (for training of complex manual skills), virtual reality surgical simulators and computer-driven, full-body mannequins, that enable team training for challenging and high-risk clinical conditions. State-of-the-art audiovisual equipment and one-way mirror observation booths ensure effective debriefing and constructive feedback to trainees.

Staffed with a multidisciplinary team of 40, MSR has trained over 200,000 trainees and over 4500 instructors and raters of various health professions in a variety of courses and exams. These courses have been carried out in collaboration with major medical institutions, including health professional schools, the Israel Ministry of Health, Israel Defense Forces, the Medical Corps, emergency medical services, medical associations, HMOs, major hospitals, risk management bodies and medical simulation, medical equipment and pharmaceutical industries.

== MSR's programs ==
=== Communication skills ===
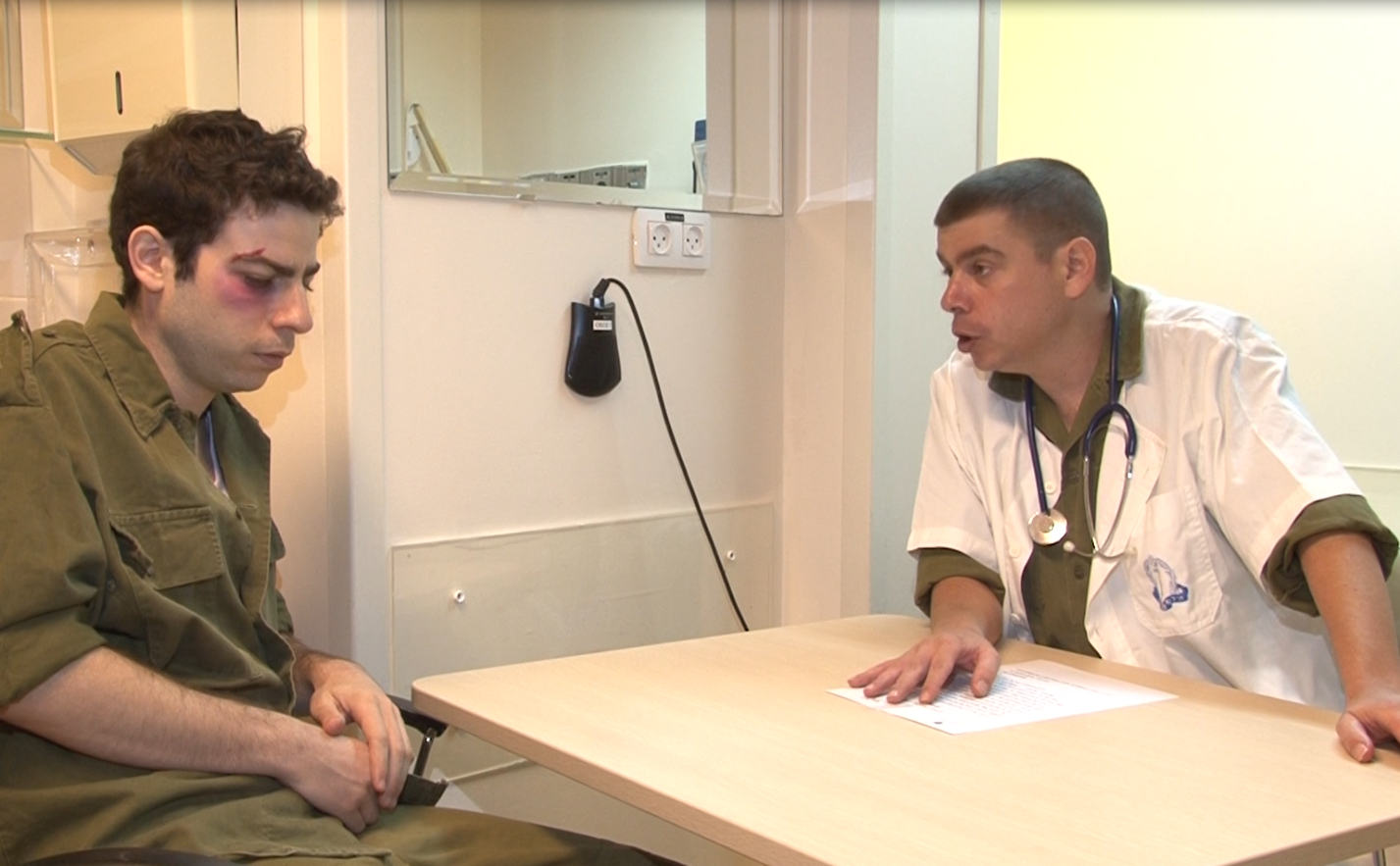
Simulation is the main tool used in practicing for the military. MSR offers a variety of training programs for military medical teams, to improve their communication capabilities in challenging military situations.

The Simulated Patient Unit trains medical professionals in communication skills essential for their practices, to help them achieve effective and compassionate interactions with their patients. The unit develops and conducts a wide range of training activities and scenarios to improve and promote human skills in general, and clinical communication skills in particular.

MSR engages some 150 role-playing actors of various ages, from adolescents to the elderly. The actors are specially trained to represent a variety of characters found in different encounters with medical caregivers: patients, family members, team members or other colleagues. The role-playing actors participate in a variety of simulations, each of which is a platform for learning, practicing and improving communication and clinical skills. These include delivering bad news, obtaining informed consent, coping with refusal of treatment, apologizing for a mistake, and practicing of neurological tests on a patient, among many others. After participating in a simulation scenario, the trainees receive feedback from the actors, their colleagues and MSR staff, based on direct observations and video recordings.

=== Clinical skills ===
The advanced training wing is equipped with high-tech patient simulators that provide practice opportunities in a simulated, controlled medical environment. The spectrum of medical simulation equipment used at MSR include:

- Simple simulators and various modules for practicing a range of medical procedures and indicators for quality of care
- Advanced technical simulation by means of computerized simulators and virtual reality
- Advanced, sophisticated simulators and medical equipment for training on complex clinical situations, staff management and team work in times of emergency. Such situations include emergency medicine, trauma, surgery, anesthesiology and intensive care, cardiology, gynecology and obstetrics, pediatrics, newborns and premature babies, ophthalmology etc.

=== MSR on Wheels ===
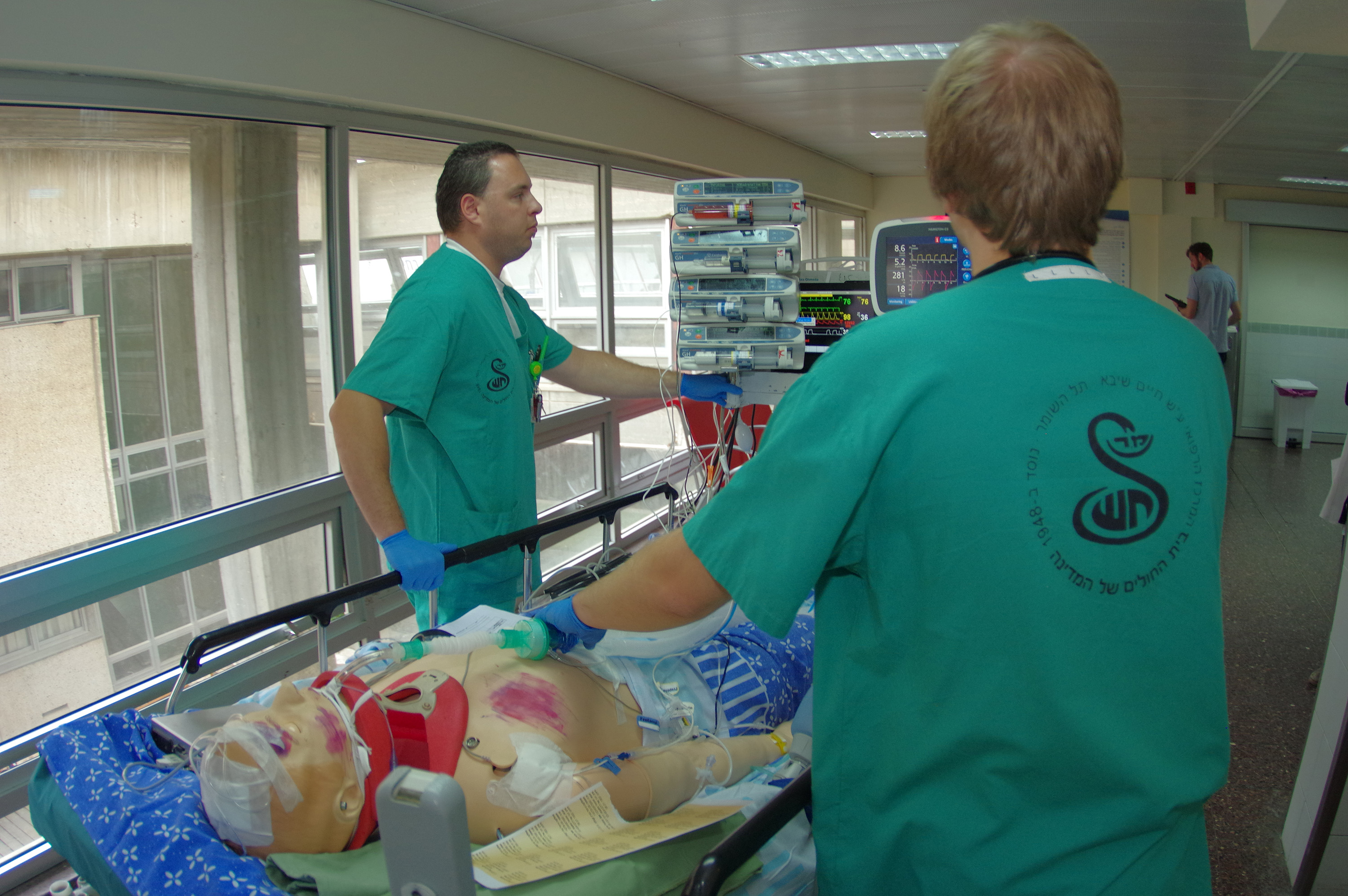
Training of intensive care with an MSR on wheels unit

Established in 2013, MSR on Wheels is a mobile unit able to provide simulation-based medical training to medical teams on=site, throughout Israel. MSR on Wheels makes MSR's services and experience training clinical and communication skills and patient safety accessible to as broad a population as possible.

== Exams and assessment ==
MSR specializes in developing simulation-based tests that expose an examinee's performance and ability to function and provide or oversee treatment in "real-life" situations. MSR also specializes in developing oral exams and training healthcare professionals to evaluate examinees in oral exams. MSR's partnership with the National Institute for Testing and Evaluation (NITE) enables professional consulting, analysis and research in simulation-based exams.

MSR partners with the NITE in the following:

- Developing simulation-based examinations conducted at MSR – Board Exams are conducted at MSR for residents specializing in Anesthesiology, Adult and Pediatric Emergency Medicine, and Radiotherapy, in collaboration with their respective professional associations. MSR also conducts registration exams for all specialized nurses in Israel in collaboration with Israel's Ministry of Health, Nursing Division, and the certification exam for paramedics, in partnership with Magen David Adom.
- Consulting development teams for examinations that are not conducted at MSR – Most of these are oral exams for Israeli medical associations. Exam development: choosing the exam structure, grading and decision-making systems, developing structured evaluation sheets, participating in writing the testing station scenarios, review of psychometric quality. MSR has assisted in developing and updating testing stations and evaluation sheets with the Israeli Associations of Surgery, Orthopedics and Oncology.
- Training the raters of the exams – training of the raters who conduct the screening exam for medical student candidates, and exams for nursing registration (over 2000 raters), certification of raters for oral exams for many of the medical associations (ENT, emergency medicine, orthopedics, surgery of the hand, etc.).

=== Medical school candidates screening ===
In collaboration with the National Institute for Testing and Evaluation (NITE), MSR provides simulation-based humanistic screening of medical school candidates.

== International collaborations ==
=== Consultation services ===
Among the simulation centers that MSR has helped in their establishment and/or collaborated with on establishing simulation-based curriculum:

- Multidisciplinary Simulation Center, Mayo Clinic, Rochester, Minnesota, United States – Collaborated on Simulation-based Intensive Care Curriculum.
- The Mt. Sinai Skills and Simulation Center at Case Western Reserve University, Cleveland, Ohio, USA
- Steinberg Centre for Simulation and Interactive Learning, McGill University, Montreal, Canada
- Hospital Israelita Albert Einstein, São Paulo, Brazil
- New York-Presbyterian Hospital/Columbia Simulation Center, Columbia University, New York City, USA
