= Ben-Horin =

Ben-Horin (בן חורין or בן-חורין; literally, "son of a free man") is a Hebrew surname. Notable people with the surname include:

- Aton Ben-Horin (born 1979), American music executive and record producer
- Daniel Ben-Horin, American entrepreneur
- Eliashiv Ben-Horin (1921–1990), Israeli diplomat
- Shomron Ben-Horin (born 1968), Israeli physician
- Yotam Ben Horin (born 1979), Israeli musician
