= Amitai Ziv =

Israeli pediatrician (born 1958)

- אֲמִתַּי זיו
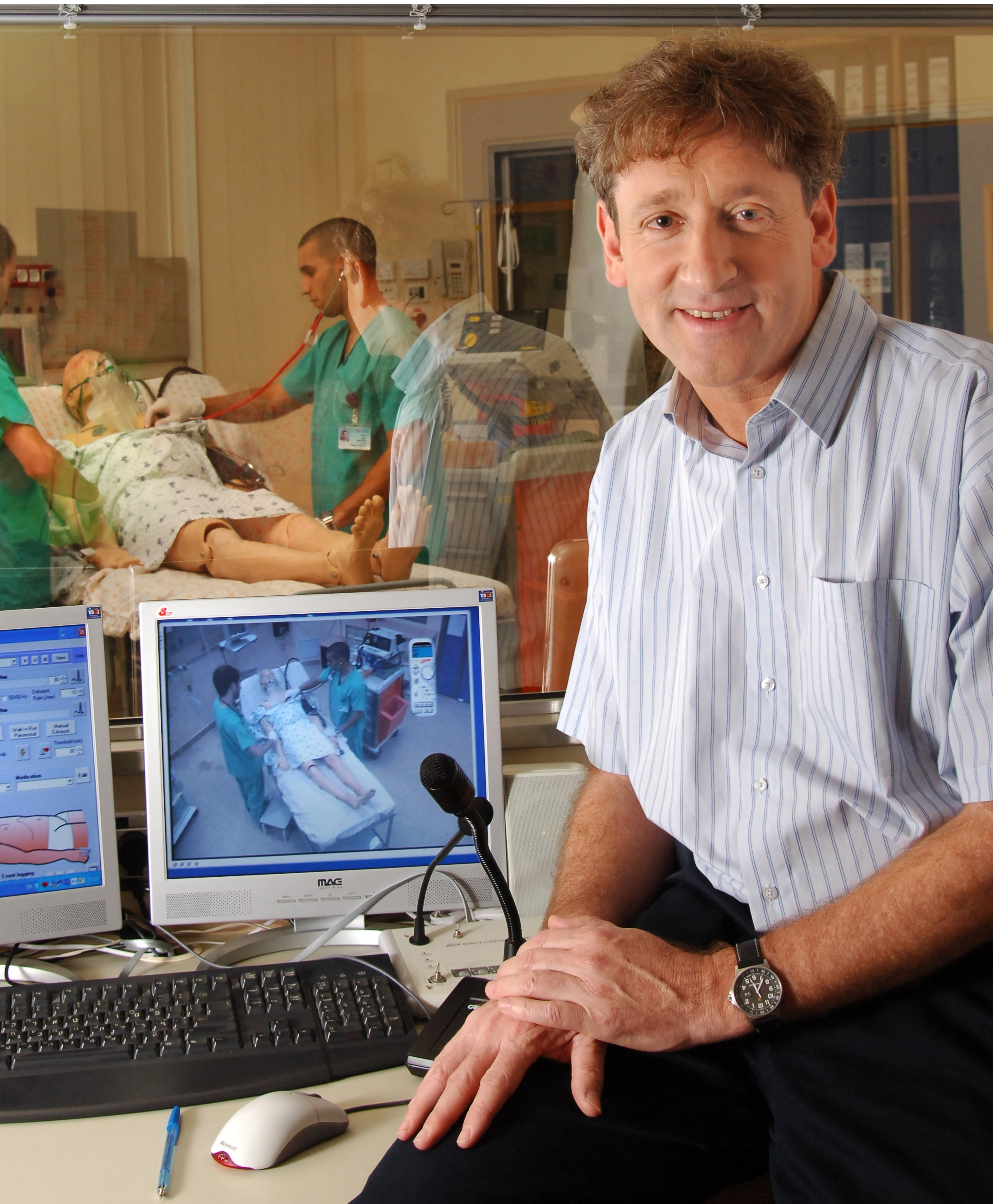
- Prof. Amitai Ziv at MSR - The Israel Center for Medical Simulation
- Born: July 29, 1958 (age 68); Jerusalem, Israel
- Citizenship: Israeli, Canadian
- Education: Hebrew University of Jerusalem
- Awards: Charles Bronfman Prize (2007)
- Scientific career
- Fields: Pediatrics, Medical Education, Medical Simulation
- Workplaces: Sheba Medical Center Tel Aviv University

Amitai Ziv, MD, MHA (Hebrew: אֲמִתַּי זיו; born 29 July 1958) is an Israeli physician, professor of Medical Education at Tel Aviv University, deputy director of the Sheba Medical Center at Tel Hashomer, founder and Director of MSR - The Israel Center for Medical Simulation.

== Biography ==
Ziv was born in Jerusalem to Canadian immigrants. He was raised in the Jerusalem Beit HaKerem neighborhood and graduated from the Hebrew University Secondary School. He enlisted in the Israeli Air Force in 1978 and served as a combat pilot and flight instructor. He graduated the Hebrew University in Jerusalem Medical School in 1989 and trained as pediatrician at Hadassah Medical Center in Jerusalem from 1993 to 1996. From 1996 to 1998 he specialized in Adolescent Medicine at the University of Pennsylvania in Philadelphia, Pennsylvania.

Ziv returned to Israel in 2000 to join the Sheba Medical Center – Tel Hashomer, as deputy director for Medical Education, Patient Safety and Risk Management. In 2001, he founded MSR - The Israel Center for Medical Simulation, and developed it as a leading institute in its field. In 2003, he received a Master's degree with distinction in Health Administration from Tel-Aviv University. in 2016 he was appointed acting director of the Rehabilitation Hospital at Sheba Medical Center in addition to his other duties at the center.

Ziv has served as a global consultant for the Educational Commission for Foreign Medical Graduates International Clinical Skills Assessment (CSA) programs, and was a member of the CSA Test Development Team in Philadelphia.

He is also the recipient of national and international awards including the 2007 Charles Bronfman Prize for Humanitarian Action, and in 2010 was appointed to serve on International Panel of Judges of the prize. He also received the 2007 Michener Honorary Diploma of Health Science Award for leadership and commitment to the Applied Health Sciences.

=== Academic record ===
From 1994 to 1996 Ziv was a Pediatrics instructor at the Hebrew University of Jerusalem Medical School. In 2005 he was appointed Clinical Senior Lecturer at the Sackler Medical School at Tel Aviv University, and from 2006 to 2010 served on the admission committee at the Sackler Medical School.

in 2010 he was appointed associate professor and head of the Department of Medical Education. He also holds a position of Adjunct Associate Professor (Pediatrics) at Case Western University Medical School in Cleveland, Ohio and Adjunct Associate Professor (Medical Education) at the Medical School of Mayo Clinic in Rochester, Minnesota.

Ziv has instructed and taught thousands of medical students, and has published numerous papers in the fields of his expertise in medical professional publications.

=== Medical Simulation pioneer ===
Ziv was introduced to Simulation Based Training while training and serving as an Israeli Airforce pilot. During his medical training in Israel and in the US, he was surprised to find out that medical professionals get all their training on living patients, where errors in treatment may endanger the patients' health and life. During his medical training in the US in 1996 – 1998, he started developing models of integrating simulation in the training of medical teams utilizing the air force training methods. He served as a member of a team developing simulation based tests for foreign medical graduated applying for jobs in the US. These simulation Based tests became mandatory in 1998.

Ziv joined the Startup Company MedSim in 1998. The company was founded by veteran Israeli Airforce pilots to develop medical simulation systems. He served as medical director and Vice President for Management and Medical Education. He started the first simulation center in Philadelphia as a joint venture of MedSim with Jefferson Medical College at Thomas Jefferson University. As director of the center he initiated and headed a simulation based training program for the medical school.

On returning to Israel he was supported by the Sheba Medical Center in establishing and funding a national simulation center. The medical simulation center, known locally and internationally as "MSR", was established in 2001, under Ziv's direction and based on his vision. The center is used for simulation-based Training of medical teams from all medical organizations in Israel, including the Ministry of Health, hospitals and medical centers around the country, HMO's, Israel Defence Forces Medical Core, and David Shield organizations.

Ziv has developed MSR into a world leading center in Medical Simulation, and he himself is recognized as a world expert in the field . He lectures around the world on Medical Simulation and advises many academic and health organizations in different countries in the development of simulation centers and training programs.

Ziv served on the founding editorial board of the Journal of the Society for Simulation in Healthcare (SSH). In 2015, he received The Presidential Citation Award on behalf of the Society for Simulation in Healthcare (SSH) in recognition of his significant contributions for quality and patient safety through the use of simulations and his advancement of the science through his leadership, scholarship and mentorship. Prof. Ziv also served as a member of two WHO Patient Safety Alliance Expert Working Groups on Medical School Patient Safety Curriculum and on Patient Safety Technology.
