= Herzliya Hebrew Gymnasium =

First Hebrew High school, in Tel Aviv, Israel

Herzliya Hebrew High School
- הגימנסיה העברית הרצליה; HaGymnasia HaIvrit Herzliya
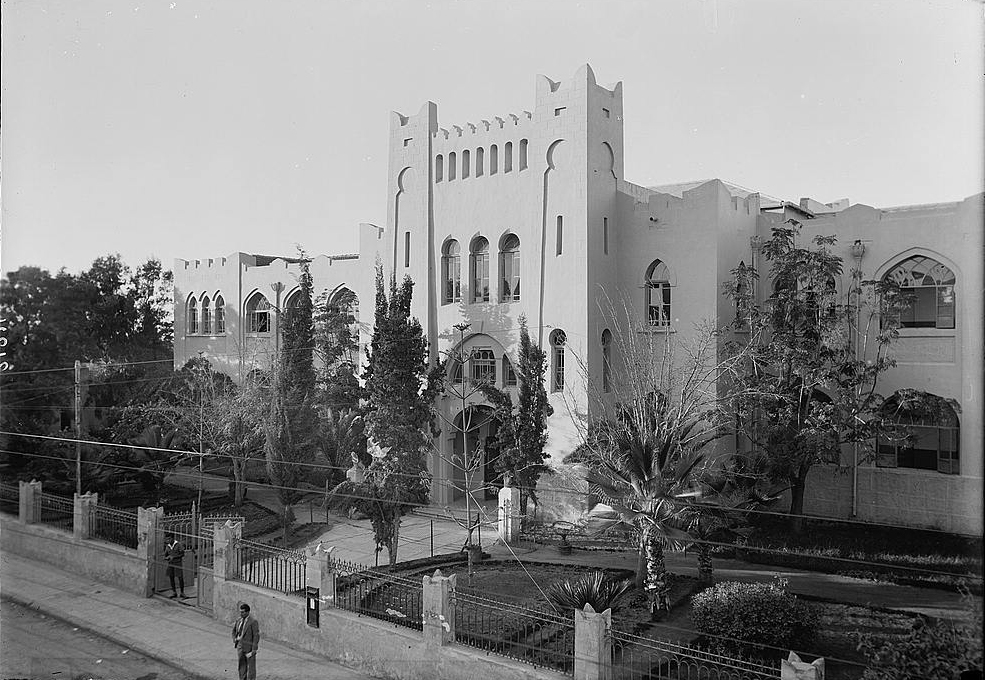
- Herzliya Hebrew High School, 1936

Location
- Tel Aviv, Israel; 32°5′13.11″N 34°47′5.38″E

Information
- Established: 1905
- Principal: Ze'ev Dgannie
- Website: gymnasia.co.il

The Herzliya Hebrew Gymnasium (Hebrew: הַגִּימְנַסְיָה הָעִבְרִית הֶרְצְלִיָּה, romanized: HaGimnasya Haivrit Herzliya, also known as Gymnasia Herzliya), originally known as HaGymnasia HaIvrit (lit. Hebrew High School), is a historic high school in Tel Aviv, Israel, whose faculty and alumni include many people influential in the history of Israel.

== History ==
=== The original building ===
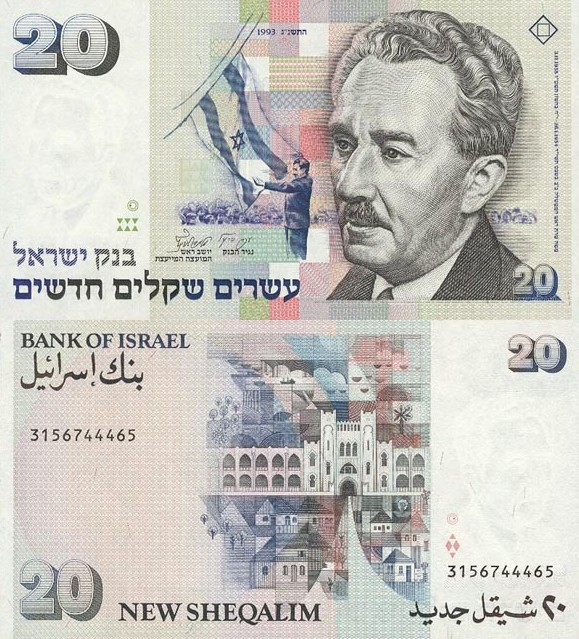
Original building depicted on the 20 Israeli new sheqel note (used in 1988-2000)

In the year of Dr. Benjamin Ze'ev Herzl's passing, the newspaper HaHashkafa wrote:

A great Hebrew neighborhood must be built in honor of Herzl, and eventually, a Hebrew city... where all its inhabitants will speak only Hebrew... In this Hebrew city, a Hebrew high school should be established in Dr. Herzl's name. This will serve, for the time being, as a living memorial to fulfill the national vision of the founder of political Zionism.

The Herzliya Gymnasium was founded in 1905 (5666 in the Hebrew calendar) by Dr. Yehuda Metman-Cohen and his wife. It was the first high school in the world to teach in Hebrew.

Gymnasia Herzliya was the country's first Hebrew high school, founded in 1905 in Jaffa, part of the Ottoman Empire in those days. The cornerstone-laying for the school's new building on Herzl Street in the Ahuzat Bayit neighborhood (the nucleus of future Tel Aviv) took place on July 28, 1909. The building was designed by Joseph Barsky, inspired by descriptions of Solomon's Temple.

An important benefactor for the establishment and development of the Gymnasium was Jacob Moser a wool merchant of Bradford in England (originally from Schleswig in Denmark). In 1907 he donated 80,000 Marks towards the construction of the Gymnasium. Ya’akov Mozer St., named after him, is situated off David Yellin St. very close to the present location of the Gymnasium.

In 1909, its iconic building was constructed on Herzl Street, which later became the center of Tel Aviv. The master plan for Ahuzat Bayit (the original name for Tel Aviv) prominently featured the large plot allocated for the first Hebrew gymnasium. The building’s façade faced Herzl Street and the railway. As Shenkin remarked, "... Every person passing by on the train will raise their eyes to the Gymnasium..." Indeed, the Gymnasium became the social and cultural hub of the young neighborhood.

The Gymnasium hosted neighborhood meetings, discussions on settlement issues, concerts, theatrical performances, and cultural evenings.

It was also the birthplace of youth movements like the Tel Aviv Scouts and Machanot HaOlim. After World War II, the Gymnasium served as a hospital. During the cornerstone-laying ceremony for its permanent building in the month of Av 5669, the founder, Dr. Metman, said:

Another architect, another teacher in our nation—these are certainly needed, but much more must still be created within our people. This alone is not enough. The private good of each individual will naturally come to them, yet we are concerned for an entire generation and hope that the Gymnasium will raise a generation of Hebrew scholars, worthy in their ideas and feelings to lead the people and show them the way.

It did not take long for Dr. Metman's prophecy to come true. The Gymnasium quickly attracted many students, including those from the Diaspora whose parents wished to provide their children with a Hebrew education. Over the decades, numerous graduates from the Gymnasium became leaders in the community: writers, educators, scientists, and artists who contributed to advancing Hebrew culture and education in the land of Israel.

To this day, thousands of Herzliya Gymnasium alumni are actively involved in Israeli culture, entertainment, arts, and academia. The building on Herzl Street was a major Tel Aviv landmark until July 1959, when it was razed for the construction of Shalom Meir Tower. The new tower was the tallest building in Israel those days, representing a significant architectural achievement.

As one of the first significant structures to be built in the first Hebrew city of Israel, the school, conceived and constructed in the founding years of Tel Aviv, came to represent the original pioneering spirit of the city and the country. The destruction of the building sparked public anger and widespread recognition of the importance of conserving historical landmarks. The Council for Conservation of Heritage Sites in Israel was founded in the 1980s partly in response to the fate of Herzliya Hebrew High School.

=== The current building ===
Located today on Jabotinsky Street, it serves as a six-year secondary school. The modern campus is entered through a gate that is reminiscent of the facade of the 1909 building.

== Principals ==
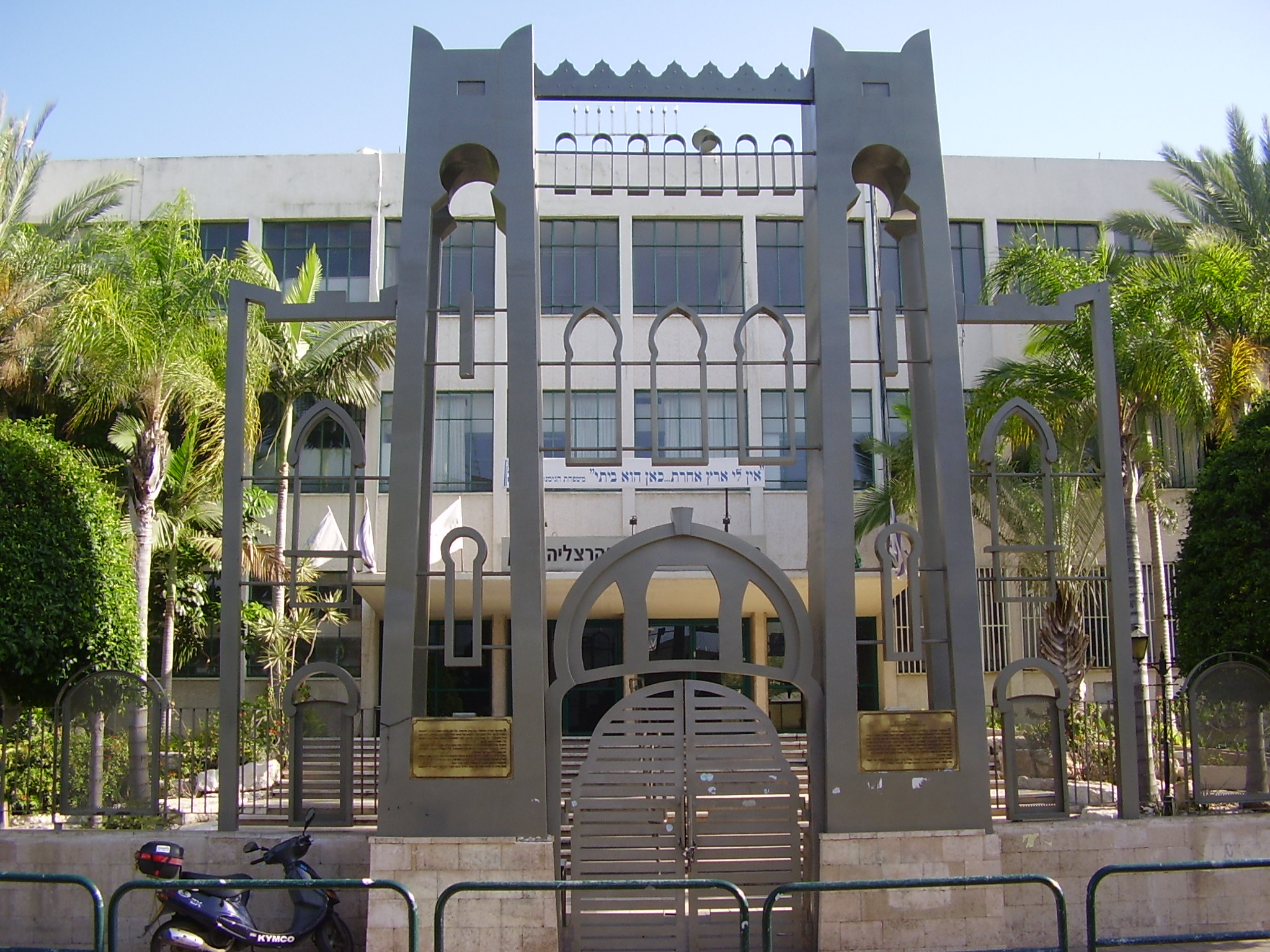
New building on Jabotinsky Street. The gate was built in 2006.

Former principals include Haim Bograshov, Baruch Ben Yehuda and Carmi Yogev. In 1992, former Air Force fighter pilot and Brigadier General Ron Huldai was appointed principal. He implemented many changes and modernizations later adopted by other schools. After leaving the school, he was elected mayor of Tel Aviv. The current principal is Ze'ev Dgannie.

== Notable faculty ==
- Yosef Haim Brenner, writer
- Joseph Constant, sculptor and writer
- Yitzhak Frenkel, painter and sculptor
- Zvi Nishri, physical education pioneer
- Shaul Tchernichovsky, poet

== Notable alumni ==
- Netiva Ben-Yehuda (1928–2011), Palmach commander, Hebrew scholar, and author
- Miriam Bernstein-Cohen (1895–1991), actress
- Aron Brand, pediatric cardiologist
- Yitzhak Danziger (1916–1977), sculptor
- Kosso Eloul (1920–1995), sculptor
- Nachum Gutman, (1898–1980), painter, sculptor, and author
- Ron Huldai (born 1944), mayor of Tel Aviv since 1998 (as of November 2025)
- Yair Lapid (born 1963), former Israeli Prime Minister, journalist, author, and politician; former Israeli Minister of Finance and chairman of the Yesh Atid Party
- Anat Lelior (born 2000), Olympic surfer
- Yaron London (born 1940), media personality, journalist, actor, and songwriter
- Amos Luzzatto (1928–2020), physicist
- Moshe Many, urologist; President of Tel Aviv University, and President of Ashkelon Academic College.
- Aharon Megged (1920–2016), writer
- Moshe Menuhin (1893–1983), author
- Yuval Neeman (1925–2006), physicist
- Elyakum Ostashinski, first mayor of Rishon LeZion
- Jacob Sadé (1925–2020), otolaryngologist, medical researcher and academic
- Moshe Shamir (1921–2004), author and playwright
- Moshe Sharett (1894–1965), second Prime Minister of Israel (1954–55)
- Avraham Shlonsky (1900–1973), poet
- Giora Spiegel (born 1947), soccer player and coach
- Avigdor Stematsky (1908–1989), painter
- Yemima Tchernovitz-Avidar (1909–1998), author
- Moses Cyrus Weiler (1907–2000), rabbi and founder of Reform Judaism in South Africa
- Shemuel Yeivin (1896–1982), archaeologist
