= Jacob Sadé =

German-born Israeli otolaryngologist (1925–2020)

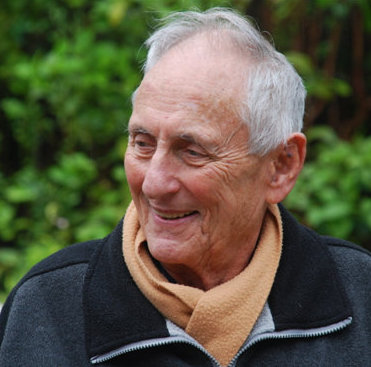
Prof Jacob Sadé

Jacob Sadé (Hebrew: יעקב שדה; 3 June 1925 – 16 March 2020) was a German-born Israeli otolaryngologist, also an emeritus professor at the Sackler School of Medicine, Tel Aviv University.

== Biography ==
Jacob Sadé was born in Berlin to Naum Sadé-Sadowsky and Ronja Feinberg, both of Kaunas, Lithuania, who were living in Germany for Naum Sadé-Sadowsky's medical studies.

The family immigrated to Palestine in 1930 where Naum Sadé-Sadowsky became one of the pioneers of otolaryngology in the country. He established the local League for Hearing Improvement and was one of the editors of the Acta Otolaryngologica Orientalia—an International ear, nose and throat journal. In 1947, after a stay in New York City, Dr. Sadé-Sadowsky performed in Tel Aviv the first surgical procedure for the improvement of hearing—i.e. Fenestration surgery.

Jacob Sadé graduated from Herzliya Hebrew Gymnasium, Tel Aviv, in 1943, studied biology at the Hebrew University in Jerusalem for two years (1943–1945) and continued his medical studies at the University of Geneva, graduating in 1951. He returned to Israel to work at the Sheba Medical Center, Tel HaShomer.

Sadé was married to Ruth and father to four children.

== Medical career ==
Sadé specialized for three years at the Ear Nose and Throat department of Massachusetts Eye and Ear hospital. after which he spent a year as a research instructor at Washington University School of Medicine. In 1959 Sadé returned to Israel and spent three years as senior ENT surgeon at the Sheba Medical Center. In 1967 he was invited to HaEmek Medical Center, Afula, to establish the first ENT department there and he served as head of the department until 1970.

In 1966 Sadé was nominated a senior lecturer at the Hebrew University in Jerusalem. In 1967 he joined the Weizmann Institute of Science as a visiting professor, working for four years in the Polymer Department, headed by Aharon Katzir, where he carried out research in the field of Otology. In 1971, Sadé was appointed head of the ENT department at the Meir Medical Center, Kfar Saba, serving there until 1990. From 1974–1980 he served as an established scientist at the office of the chief scientist of the Israel Ministry of Health and in 1975 he was nominated a full professor at the Tel Aviv University. In 1975–1976 Sadé was a visiting professor at Roy J. and Lucille A. Carver College of Medicine, and in 1979 a visiting professor at Boston University School of Medicine. In 198?, Sadé was appointed Incumbent of the Felix and Sara Dumont Chair of Hearing Disorders Research at Tel Aviv University.

From 1986 to 1990 Sadé served as President of the Israeli Ear Nose and Throat Society and was the coordinator of the ENT yearly scientific prize. In 1998 he became head of the committee for coordinating ear research of the International Federation of Oto-Rhino-Laryngological Societies and in 1990 he established and directed (until 2010) the Ear Research Laboratory in the department of Bioengineering at the Tel Aviv University, where in 1993 he was nominated as professor emeritus.

== Clinical and scientific fields of interest ==
Sadé worked for 40 years in ENT departments of various university hospitals, in Israel and in the US, and established two ENT departments which he headed for 30 years, and where many physicians and students studied otolaryngology. His clinical, surgical and scientific main interest centered on hearing, inflammatory ear diseases, cholesteatoma, the facial nerve, equilibrium, and microsurgery of the middle ear. He was the first in Israel to introduce a novel type of ear surgery (stapedectomy) and contributed substantially to the discipline of ear microsurgery.

Sadé's research dealt with the subjects that interested him clinically, leading to new surgical techniques and new concepts. Sadé was the first to describe the mucus-ciliary system of the middle ear—studies which demonstrated that the function of these microscopic organelles depends on the presence of mucus and its biochemical composition. Likewise he found that middle ear mucus hypersecretion is the most frequent cause of hearing deficit, especially in children. These findings led to further studies related to middle ear pressure vacillation and problems of middle ear aeration and gas composition.

Sadé was a member of the editorial boards of 10 international scientific journals and was an honorary member of 19 national and international scientific associations dealing mostly with ear diseases.

Sadé was one of the initiators and organizers of the Mediterranean Society of Otology and Audiology (MSOA) and the Politzer Society (an international society for otologic surgery and science). He was invited to present lectures at 166 international meetings at 69 universities in 25 countries and he initiated and presided over seven international ENT congresses in the field of hearing disorders and ear diseases. Sadé published 190 scientific papers in international scientific journals, 49 summaries and eight books on ear diseases. In addition, he supervised 21 doctoral and master's dissertations.

== Published works ==
- Sadé, J. (1966), "Middle Ear Mucosa". Arch Otolaryngol, 84:137–143.
- Sadé, J. (1966), "Pathology and Pathogenesis of Serous Otitis Media". Arch Otolaryngol, 84:297–305.
- Sadé, J. (1972), "Pathology of Bell's Palsy". Arch Otolaryngol, 95:406–414.
- Sadé, J. (ed.) (1979). Secretory Otitis Media and Its Sequelae. Churchill Livingstone: New York, Edinburgh, London.
- Sadé, J. (1981), "Meniere's Disease". J Laryngol Otol, 95:261–271.
- Sadé, J., Avraham, S., Berko, E. (1981), "Atelectasis, Retraction Pockets and Cholesteatoma". Acta Oto-Laryngol, 92:501–512.
- Sadé, J. (1982), "Treatment of Retraction Pockets and Cholesteatoma" J Laryngol Otol, 82:585–704.
- Sadé, J., Luntz, M. (1988), "Fluctuations of Middle Ear Aeration in Atelectatic Ears". Acta Oto-Laryngol (Stockh) Suppl, 458:48–51.
- Sadé, J., Luntz, M. (1991), "Gas Diffusion in the Middle Ear". Acta Oto-Laryngol, 111:354–357
- Sadé, J., Fuchs, C., Luntz, M.(1996), "The Pars Flaccida, Middle Ear Pressure and Mastoid Pneumatization Index". Acta Oto-Laryngol, 116:284–287
- Sadé, J., Ar, A. (1997), "The Middle Ear and Auditory Tube". Otolaryngol Head Neck Surg, 116:499–524.
- Sadé, J. (2001), "Hyperectasis: The Hyperinflated Tympanic Membrane – The Middle Ear as an Actively Controlled System". J Otol Neurol, 22:133–139.
- Sadé, J., Handrich, Y., Bernheim, J., Cohen, D. (2008), "Pressure Equilibration in the Penguin Middle Ear". Acta Oto-Laryngol, 128:18–21.
