= Yuval Heled =

Israeli academic

- יובל חלד
- Education: Hebrew University of Jerusalem
- Occupations: Academic and Doctor

Yuval Heled (Hebrew: יובל חלד) is an Israeli scientist, author, and lecturer. He is an expert in the sciences of integrative physiology and exercise physiology.

== Career ==
Heled was the director of the Institute for Military Physiology at Sheba Medical Center in central Israel.

In the past, he served as the chief physiologist of the IDF in the Medical Corps. Among his scientific fields of activity are the study of the limits of the human body's performances, survival in extreme conditions, physical training, adaptation to stress, health promotion and life expectancy extension. He serves as a full professor in the Faculty of Science at the Kibbutzim Seminary College and teaches at other academic institutions in Israel and around the world. He published dozens of scientific articles and book chapters, and authored two books: 'Health outside the comfort zone, the science of hormesis', and - 'How long until only 120?'. His broad and integrative education and experience have made Professor Haled a sought-after lecturer and consultant in academia, organizations and companies, as well as in personal counseling settings.

== Membership in organizations ==
- Senior Fellow at the American College of Sports Medicine ACSM
- Member of the Consortium for Health and Physical Performance (CHAMP) of the USU School of Medicine in the United States
- Member of the Academic Council, the Kibbutzim College, Tel Aviv, Israel
