= Elyakum Ostashinski =

Israeli politician

- אליקום אוסטשינסקי

1st mayor of Rishon Letzion
- In office 1950–1951
- Succeeded by: Aryeh Sheftel

Personal details
- Born: 25 March 1909 Petah Tikva, Ottoman Empire
- Died: 1983 Israel
- Spouse: Shulamit Tulipman

Elyakum Ostashinski or Elyakum Austshinsky (Hebrew: אליקום אוסטשינסקי), born 1909, died 1983, was the first mayor of Rishon LeZion, and later CEO of the Vineyard Association.

== Education ==
Ostashinski was born in Petah Tikva. His parents were pioneers of the First Aliyah. He graduated from Herzliya Gymnasium in Tel Aviv. He studied agriculture at University of Toulouse in France. After graduation, he went to Algeria, and focused on growing citrus and cotton.

In 1930, Ostashinski returned to Mandatory Palestine and worked as a winemaker in a winery in Rishon LeZion. A year later, he went to Italy, where he received a doctorate degree in agronomy.

== Career ==
After returning to Rishon LeZion, Ostashinski became director of the agricultural department of the Farmers Association, and director of the department of rehabilitation grower Citrus Marketing Board. He also served as chairman of the Rishon Lezion branch of the Association of colonies, branch chairman of the Association of Rishon Lezion, member of the Maccabi Eretz Israel, and was a member of an organization headquarters defense.

In 1946, Ostashinski was elected mayor of "local" Rishon Lezion. He served until 1951, and in his last year in office, Rishon Lezion was declared a city. Starting in 1953, he directed the Vineyard Association, the controlling shareholder in Carmel Winery, and held this position for about thirty years.
