= Haim Ben-Shahar =

Israeli economist, and former President of Tel Aviv University

- חיים בן שחר
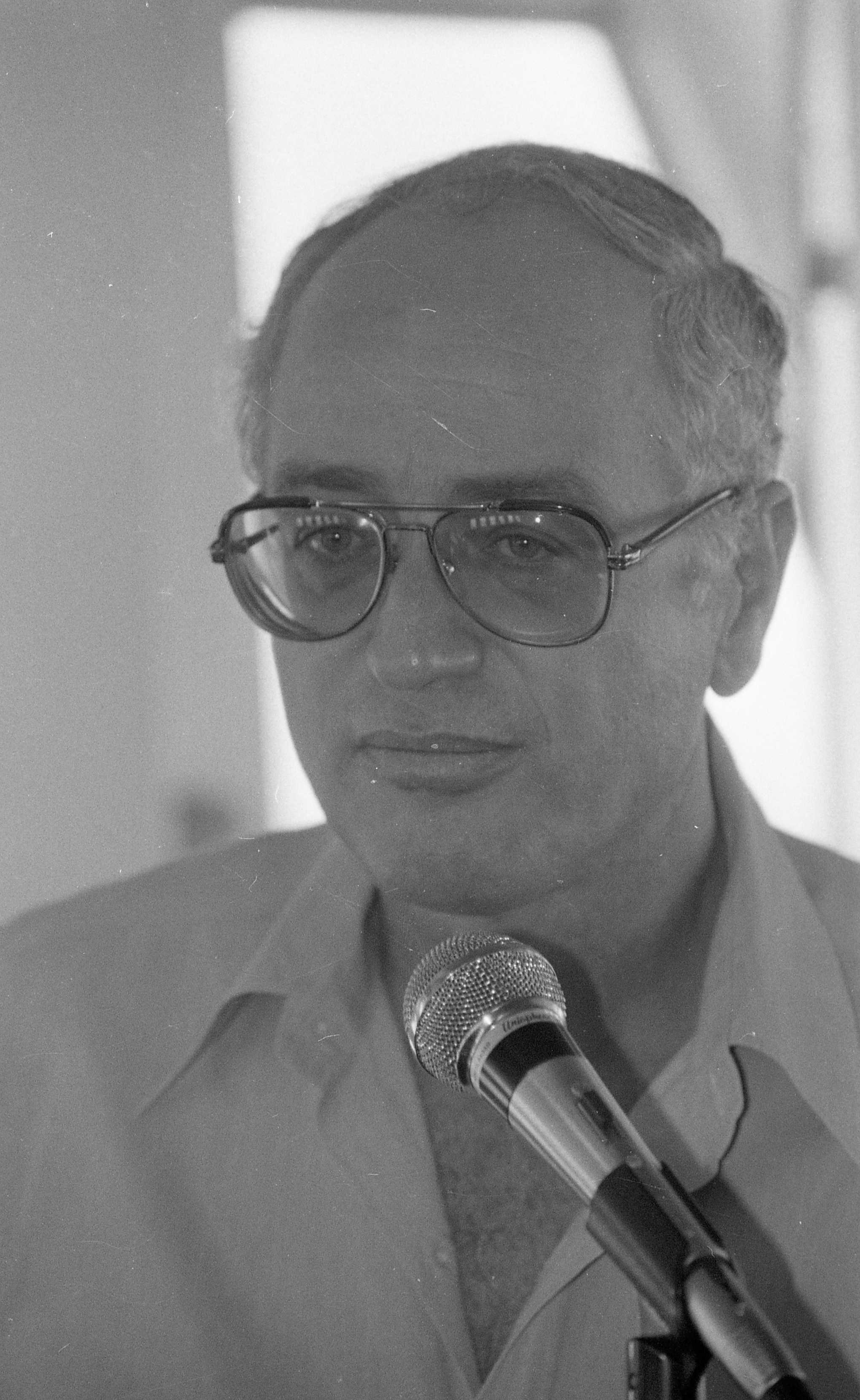
- Haim Ben-Shahar
- Born: חיים בן שחר; Israel
- Occupation: economist
- Known for: President of Tel Aviv University

Haim Ben-Shahar (Hebrew: חיים בן שחר; born c. 1935) is an Israeli economist, and former President of Tel Aviv University.

== Biography ==
Ben-Shahar was born in Mandatory Palestine. He attended Tichon Hadash high school in Tel Aviv. He earned a Ph.D. in Banking and Finance from New York University in the United States.

Ben-Shahar is an economist and taught economics at Tel Aviv University. From 1972 to 1975 Ben-Shahar was Dean of the university's Social Sciences faculty.

Ben-Shahar was President of Tel Aviv University from 1977 to 1983. He succeeded Professor Yuval Ne'eman as President, and was in turn succeeded by Moshe Many.
