= Moshe Many =

- משה מני
- Born: 1928; Mandatory Palestine
- Died: 2015 (aged 86–87)
- Education: Geneva University (M.D., 1952); Tufts University (Ph.D. in renal physiology, 1969)
- Occupation: urologist
- Known for: President of Tel Aviv University; President of Ashkelon Academic College
- Awards: Israeli Ministry of Health Lifetime Achievement Award

Moshe Many (Hebrew: משה מני; 1928-2015) was an Israeli urologist who was President of Tel Aviv University from 1983 to 1991, and President of Ashkelon Academic College from 2002 to 2012.

== Biography ==
Moshe was born in Hebron to Israel and Simcha Mani, of the well-established Mani family. His great-grandfather was Rabbi Eliyahu Mani, the renown scholar who led the Jewish community of Hebron for 40 years. His father was Dr. Israel Mani, who served as a judge. The family survived the 1929 Hebron massacre when he was a child.

Many attended Gymnasia Herzliya school in Tel Aviv, and then a Protestant English school in Jerusalem. He earned an M.D. from Geneva University in Switzerland in 1952, and a Ph.D. in renal physiology from Tufts University in Massachusetts in 1969.

In the early 1960s Many was head of the urology department at Sheba Medical Center in Tel Hashomer in Ramat Gan, Israel.

At the request of the Israeli government he flew to various Islamic countries and over the years and secretly treated Muslim dignitaries including shah of Iran. In the 1980s he was asked to contact the Sudanese government in preparation for Operation Moses the 1984 airlift that rescued Jewish-Ethiopians.

Many was President of Tel Aviv University, from 1983 to 1991, following Haim Ben-Shahar and succeeded by Yoram Dinstein.

He served as President of Ashkelon Academic College, from 2002 to 2012.

Starting in 2010 he was Vice Chairman of the board of directors of Teva Pharmaceutical Industries.

In 2010 Many received the Israeli Ministry of Health Lifetime Achievement Award for developing the urological field in Israel, and for promoting ties with other countries, including some Arab states.
