= Shomron Ben-Horin =

Israeli physician

Shomron Ben-Horin (Hebrew: שומרון בן-חורין; born 1968, Tel Aviv) is an Israeli physician and academic gastroenterologist, and a co-founder of Evinature. He is the chief of the Gastroenterology Department at Sheba Medical Center and a professor of medicine at Tel-Aviv University.

He received his MD from the Hadassah School of Medicine of the Hebrew University of Jerusalem before completing his gastroenterology training at Sheba Medical Center in Tel Aviv.

== Medical career ==
Ben-Horin is the chief of the Gastroenterology Department at Sheba Medical Center, Israel. He was previously Director of the inflammatory bowel disease service at the Sheba Gastroenterology Department.

He was a postdoctoral scientist in the laboratory of human immunology at NewYork-Presbyterian Hospital, and in 2015, was an adjunct professor of medicine at the 1st Affiliated Hospital of Sun Yat-sen University, Guangzhou, China.

After his research on CurQD (Curcumin-QingDai) for patients with ulcerative colitis, Ben-Horin co-founded Evinature with his research partner Nir Salomon in 2020.

== Professional organizations ==
Ben-Horin has chaired the Israel IBD Society. He has served as associate editor of the Journal of Crohn's & Colitis (JCC), is a member of the editorial board of Gut (journal), and has served on the Scientific Committee of the European Crohn's & Colitis Organization (ECCO); he is a member of the International Organization for the Study of Inflammatory Bowel Disease (IOIBD).

He was previously the director of IBD Passport, a web-based global support program for traveling IBD patients. He originated ECCO-CONFER, a network through which physicians collaboratively report rare IBD cases.

== Clinical and scientific fields of interest ==
Ben-Horin's main research focus is drug mechanisms, therapeutic drug monitoring and immunogenicity of biologics, response to biologic antibody drugs in IBD, and opportunistic infections in IBD. He has authored several hundred peer-reviewed articles, cited over 21,000 times. He has initiated and led several multicenter randomized controlled trials, including ComboMesa, which tested the addition of mesalamine to corticosteroids in acute severe ulcerative colitis, and a double-blind placebo-controlled trial of Curcumin-QingDai in active ulcerative colitis.

== Awards ==
In 2015, Ben-Horin received the Géza Hetényi Memorial Medallion from the Hungarian Society of Gastroenterology.

== Selected publications ==
- Ben-Horin, S.; Yavzori, M.; Katz, L.; Kopylov, U.; Picard, O.; Fudim, E.; Coscas, D.; Bar-Meir, S.; Goldstein, I.; Chowers, Y. (2011). "The immunogenic part of infliximab is the F(ab')2, but measuring antibodies to the intact infliximab molecule is more clinically useful". Gut. 60 (1): 41–48. doi:10.1136/gut.2009.201533. PMID 20519742.
- Ben-Horin, S.; Yavzori, M.; Benhar, I.; Fudim, E.; Picard, O.; Ungar, B.; Lee, S.; Kim, S.; Eliakim, R.; Chowers, Y. (2016). "Cross-immunogenicity: antibodies to infliximab in Remicade-treated patients with IBD similarly recognise the biosimilar Remsima". Gut. 65 (7): 1132–1138. doi:10.1136/gutjnl-2015-309290. PMID 25897019.
- Ben-Horin, S.; et al. (2022). "Efficacy of Biologic Drugs in Short-Duration Versus Long-Duration Inflammatory Bowel Disease: A Systematic Review and an Individual-Patient Data Meta-Analysis of Randomized Controlled Trials". Gastroenterology. 162 (2): 482–494. doi:10.1053/j.gastro.2021.10.037. PMID 34757139.
- Ben-Horin, S.; et al. (2022). "Corticosteroids and Mesalamine Versus Corticosteroids for Acute Severe Ulcerative Colitis: A Randomized Controlled Trial". Clinical Gastroenterology and Hepatology. 20 (12): 2868–2875. doi:10.1016/j.cgh.2022.02.055. PMID 35272029.
- Louis, E.; et al. (2023). "Withdrawal of infliximab or concomitant immunosuppressant therapy in patients with Crohn's disease on combination therapy (SPARE): a multicentre, open-label, randomised controlled trial". The Lancet Gastroenterology & Hepatology. 8 (3): 215–227. doi:10.1016/S2468-1253(22)00385-5. PMID 36640794.
- Ben-Horin, S.; et al. (2024). "Curcumin-QingDai Combination for Patients With Active Ulcerative Colitis: A Randomized, Double-Blinded, Placebo-Controlled Trial". Clinical Gastroenterology and Hepatology. 22 (2): 347–356. doi:10.1016/j.cgh.2023.05.023. PMID 37302449.
- Ben-Horin, S.; et al. (2025). "Capsule Endoscopy-Guided Proactive Treat-to-Target Versus Continued Standard Care in Patients With Quiescent Crohn's Disease: A Randomized Controlled Trial". Gastroenterology. 169 (1): 85–93. doi:10.1053/j.gastro.2025.02.031. PMID 40107519.
