= Ashkelon Academic College =

- המכללה האקדמית אשקלון
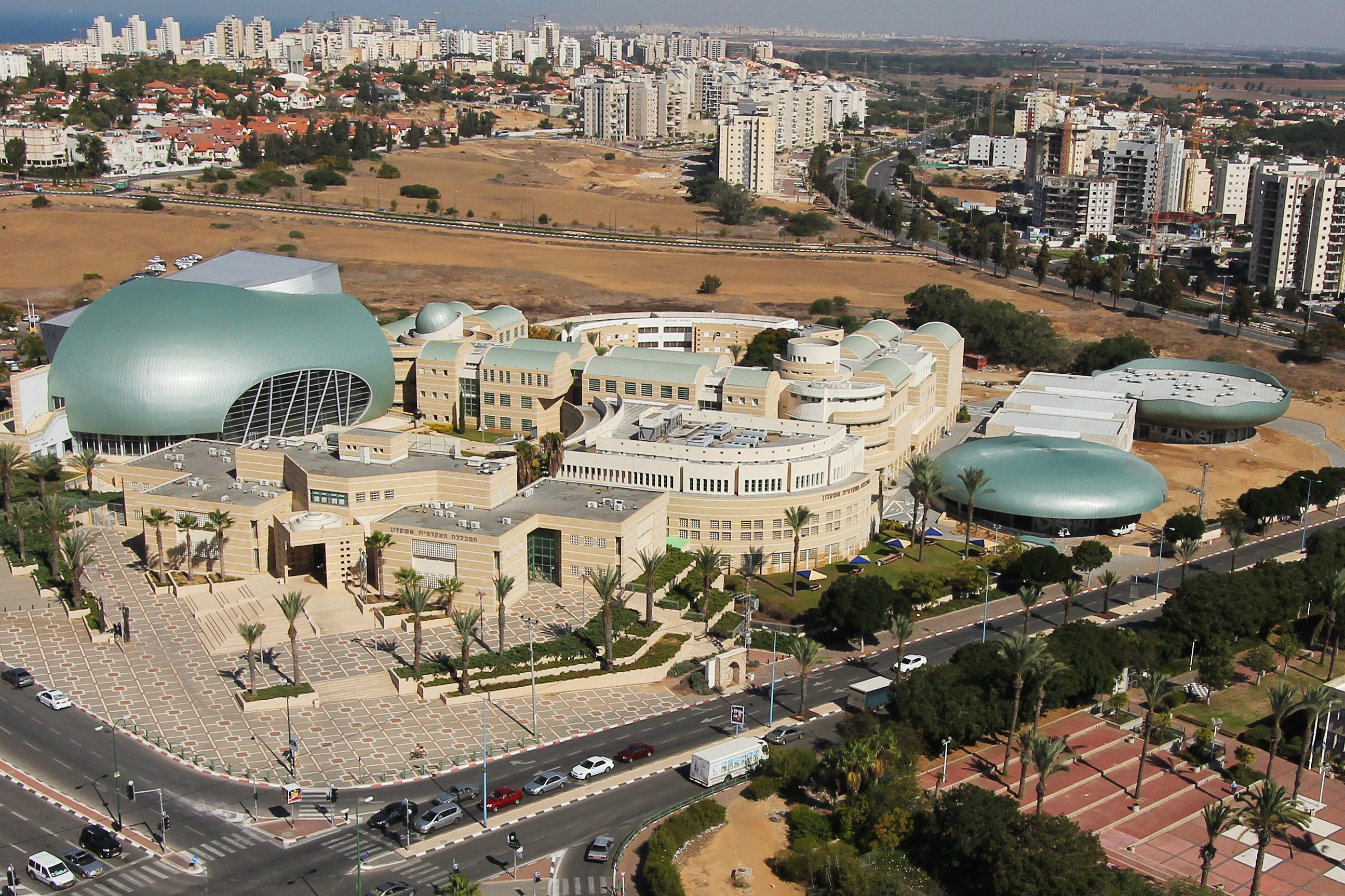
- Type: Public
- Established: 1967
- President: Prof. Haim Breitbart
- Rector: Prof. Shimon Sharvit
- Students: 3,917
- Undergraduates: 3,809
- Postgraduates: 108
- Location: Ashkelon, Israel; 31°40′8.59″N 34°34′17.97″E
- Website: www.aac.ac.il

Ashkelon Academic College (Hebrew: המכללה האקדמית אשקלון, HaMiklala HaAkademit Ashkelon) is a public college in Ashkelon, Israel. The college has two faculties, the School of Economics and Social Work, for management, logistics, banking, and accounting, in which undergraduate and graduate studies take place, as well as the School of Health Sciences, for undergraduate studies in nutrition, nursing, and public health.

The college provides programs in undergraduate studies in the fields of politics and government, computer science, sociology and anthropology, psychology, criminology, Land of Israel studies, tourism and multidisciplinary studies in the social sciences.

== History ==
The college was founded in 1967 as a branch of Bar-Ilan University and focused mainly on teaching accountancy and banking. Student numbers were only a couple of dozen.

In 1988 the management was changed and the college began to expand its activity; in 1990 it was recognised by the Education Minister of Israel Zevulun Hammer as a regional college, which meant its students spent the first two years in the college and after that transferred to Bar-Ilan University.

In 1992 Bar-Ilan University approved the college to grant bachelor's degrees on its behalf, and in 1998 the university transferred to a new campus. Moshe Many was President of the College from 2002 to 2012.

== See also ==
- List of universities and colleges in Israel
