= Acta Oto-Laryngologica =

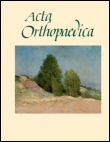
- Discipline: Otolaryngology
- Language: English
- Edited by: Matti Anniko

Publication details
- History: 1918–present
- Publisher: Taylor and Francis Group
- Frequency: Monthly
- Impact factor: 1.698 (2021)

Standard abbreviations
- ISO 4: Acta Oto-Laryngol.

Indexing
- ISSN: 0001-6489 (print); 1651-2553 (web)

Links
- Journal website

Acta Oto-Laryngologica is a peer-reviewed medical journal covering otolaryngology and head & neck surgery. It presents papers on clinical practice, clinical research, and basic sciences. It is published by Taylor and Francis Group. As of 2023 the editor-in-chief is Matti Anniko (Uppsala University).
