= Sheba Medical Center =

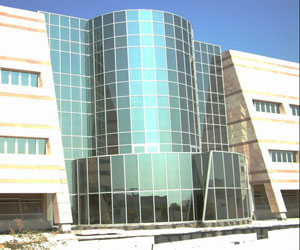

Geography
- Location: Tel HaShomer, Ramat Gan, Tel Aviv District, Israel
- Coordinates: 32°2′49.75″N 34°50′42.41″E

Organisation
- Affiliated university: Tel Aviv University

Services
- Emergency department: Yes
- Beds: 1,580

Helipads
- Helipad: yes

History
- Founded: 1948

Links
- Website: http://eng.sheba.co.il/
- Lists: Hospitals in Israel
- Other links: sheba.co.il

Chaim Sheba Medical Center at Tel HaShomer (Hebrew: המרכז הרפואי ע"ש חיים שיבא – תל השומר), also known as Tel HaShomer Hospital, is the largest hospital in Israel, located in Tel HaShomer neighborhood, city of Ramat Gan, Tel Aviv District.

In 2025, Newsweek ranked it as the 8th-best hospital in the world, scoring the highest for an Asian or Israeli hospital.

== History ==
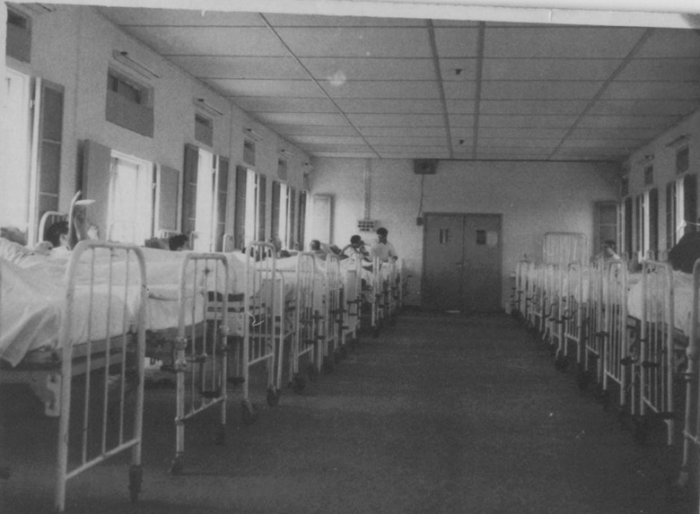
Tel Hashomer hospital, 1947

The hospital was established in 1948 as Israel's first military hospital, to treat Israeli casualties of the 1948 Arab–Israeli War. It was founded in a cluster of abandoned military barracks from the Mandate era, and was originally known as Army Hospital No. 5. Israeli prime minister David Ben-Gurion had it renamed Tel HaShomer Hospital.

In 1953, it became a civilian hospital, and Dr. Chaim Sheba became its director. Following Sheba's death, the hospital was renamed in his honor. Mordechai Shani served as Director General for thirty-three years.

Situated on an 800-dunam (0.80 km^{2}; 0.31 sq mi) campus in East Ramat Gan, Sheba operates 159 departments and clinics. It has almost 2,000 beds, about 1,700 physicians, and 12,000 other healthcare workers. Sheba also employs 1,700 other staff, and nearly 1,000 long-term volunteers, researchers and foreign interns.

It handles over 1,000,000 patient visits a year, including 200,000 emergency visits annually, and conducts more than two million medical tests of all types each year, on a $320 million (approximate) annual budget. Sheba is supported by donations from a network of philanthropists and friends from around the world.

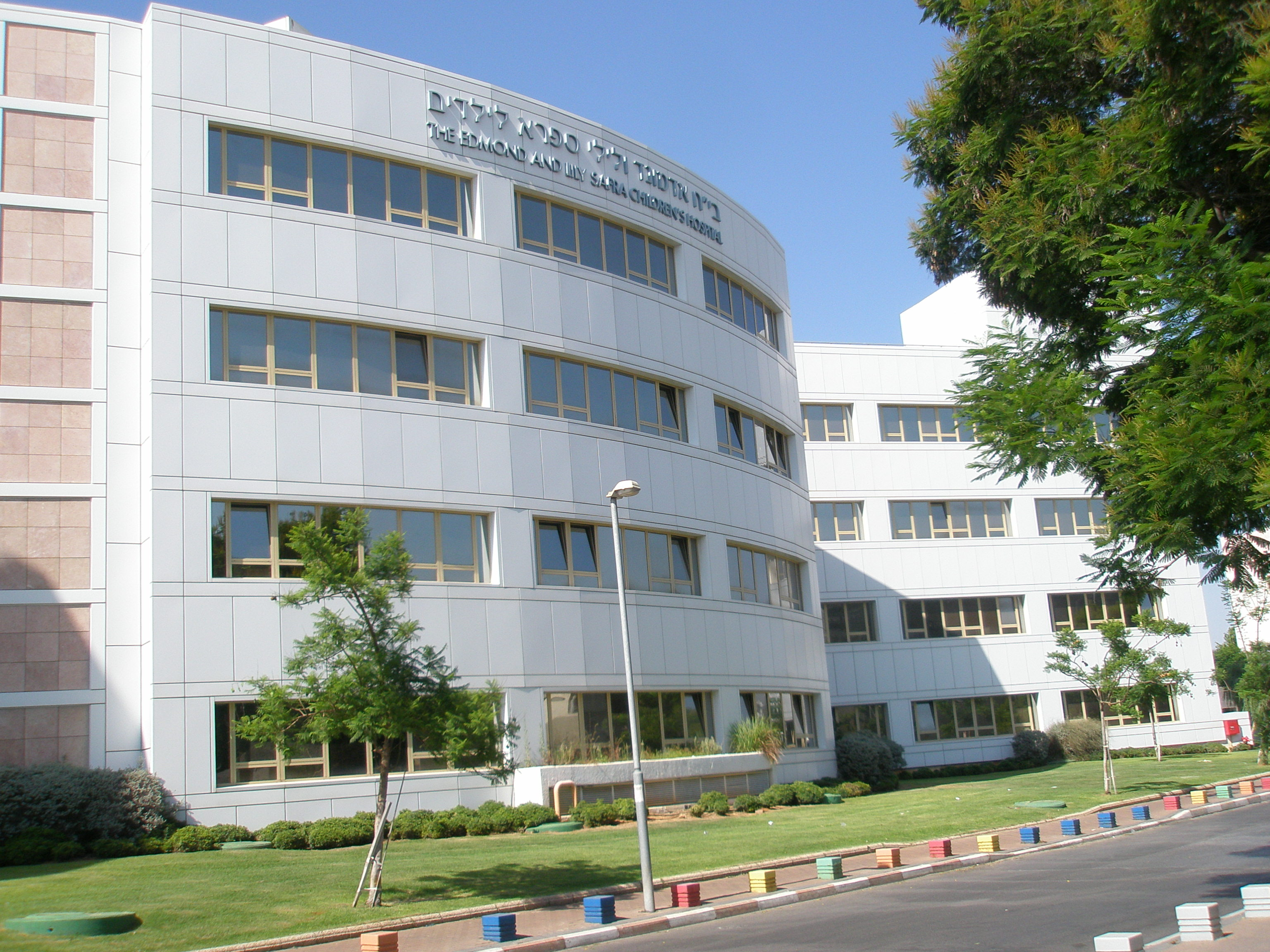
Edmond and Lily Safra Children's Hospital

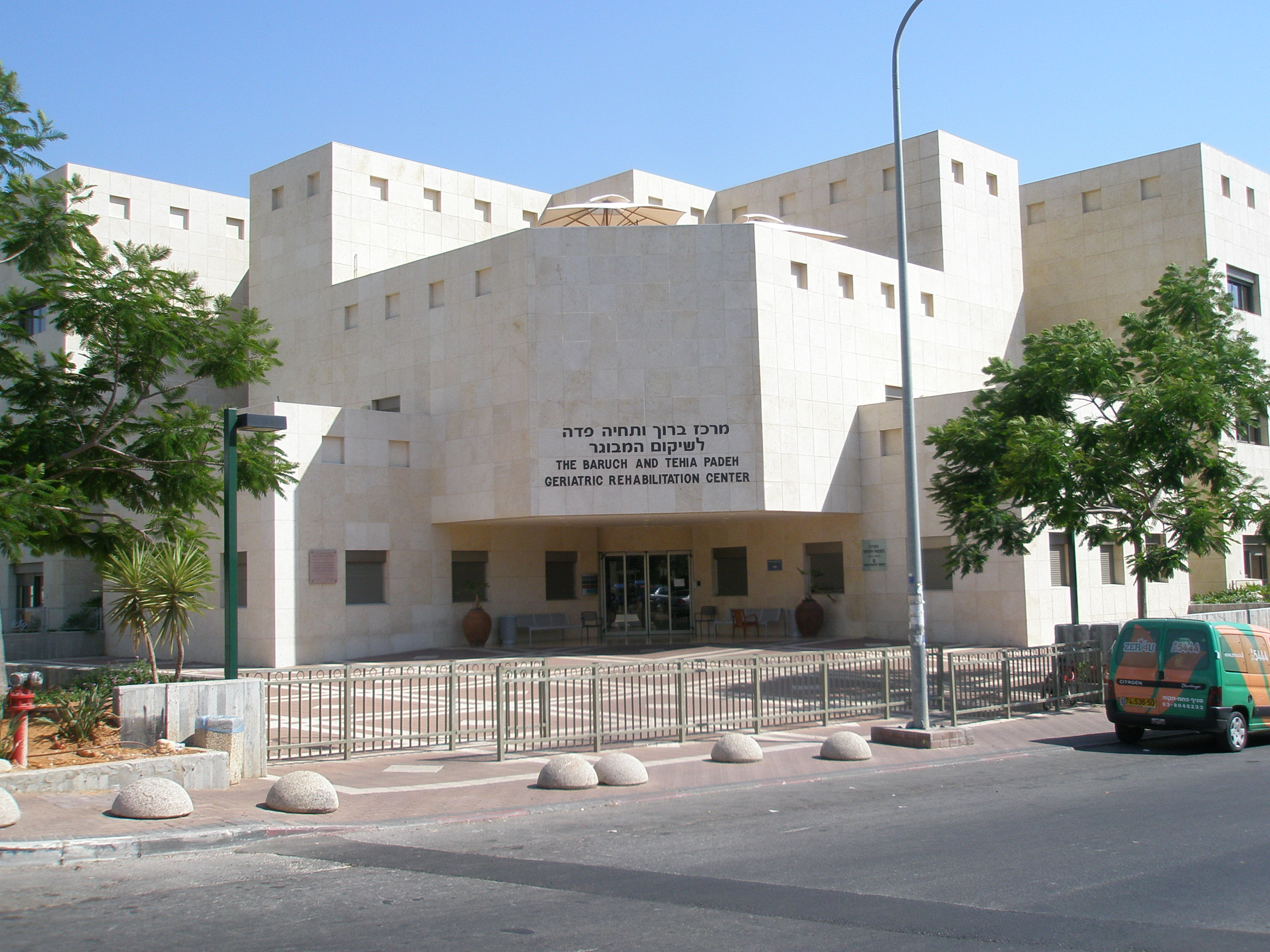
Padeh Geriatric Rehabilitation Center

Sheba includes an acute care hospital, a rehabilitation hospital (one of the largest rehabilitation hospitals in the world, with 800 beds and 14 buildings), a women's hospital, a children's hospital, an eating disorder clinic, a PTSD clinic for soldiers, a laboratory division, an outpatient division, and an academic campus.

Sheba is home to the Israel National Center for Health Policy and Epidemiology Research (equivalent to the U.S. National Institutes of Health), the internationally acclaimed Israel National Center for Medical Simulation (MSR), the Israel National Blood Bank and Cord Blood Bank, and the Safra International Congenital Heart Center. Other major centers at Sheba include the Sheba Cancer Treatment and Research Centers, the Sheba Heart Center that was donated by Lev Leviev, and the Tel Hashomer Medical Research, Infrastructure and Services Co. Ltd., which provides global consulting and training services There is also a rehabilitation hotel, the Shilev Hotel, for recuperating patients. It has 36 double rooms and a medical wing with a doctors office, nurses room, and treatment room.

Sheba provides services to patients from across the Middle East, including many patients (especially children) from the Palestinian Authority. It also provides guidance and mentoring in the planning, construction and operation of healthcare systems and hospitals around the world. Sheba has helped to found a multi-disciplinary clinic in Ukraine, an imaging Center in Uzbekistan, a medical center in the Republic of Equatorial Guinea, an oncology center in Mauritania, a polyclinic in the Ivory Coast, and more. Sheba has sent medical support to Kosovo, Armenia, Cambodia, Sri Lanka, and Rwanda. Many patients from the Palestinian Authority and the Arab world are treated at Sheba. After a massive explosion in Equatorial Guinea, a relief mission was sent by Sheba Medical Center. Eight Kurdish infants in need of emergency cardiac surgery were operated on in Israel by Sheba's pediatric cardiac-thoracic surgeons. In December 2020, Sheba's Israel Center for Disaster Medicine and Humanitarian Response team dispatched a coronavirus medical team to the Piedmont region of Northern Italy. Sheba sent a large shipment of equipment to Uruguay along with experts in logistics, treatment and pandemic mitigation.

In 2021, the United Arab Emirates (UAE) announced the signing of a Memorandum of Understanding (MoU) with Sheba Medical Center. According to a statement released by the Emirates News Agency, the MoU aims to "create a framework for cooperation in developing and improving healthcare services to meet the needs of a healthier community."

== Clinical research ==
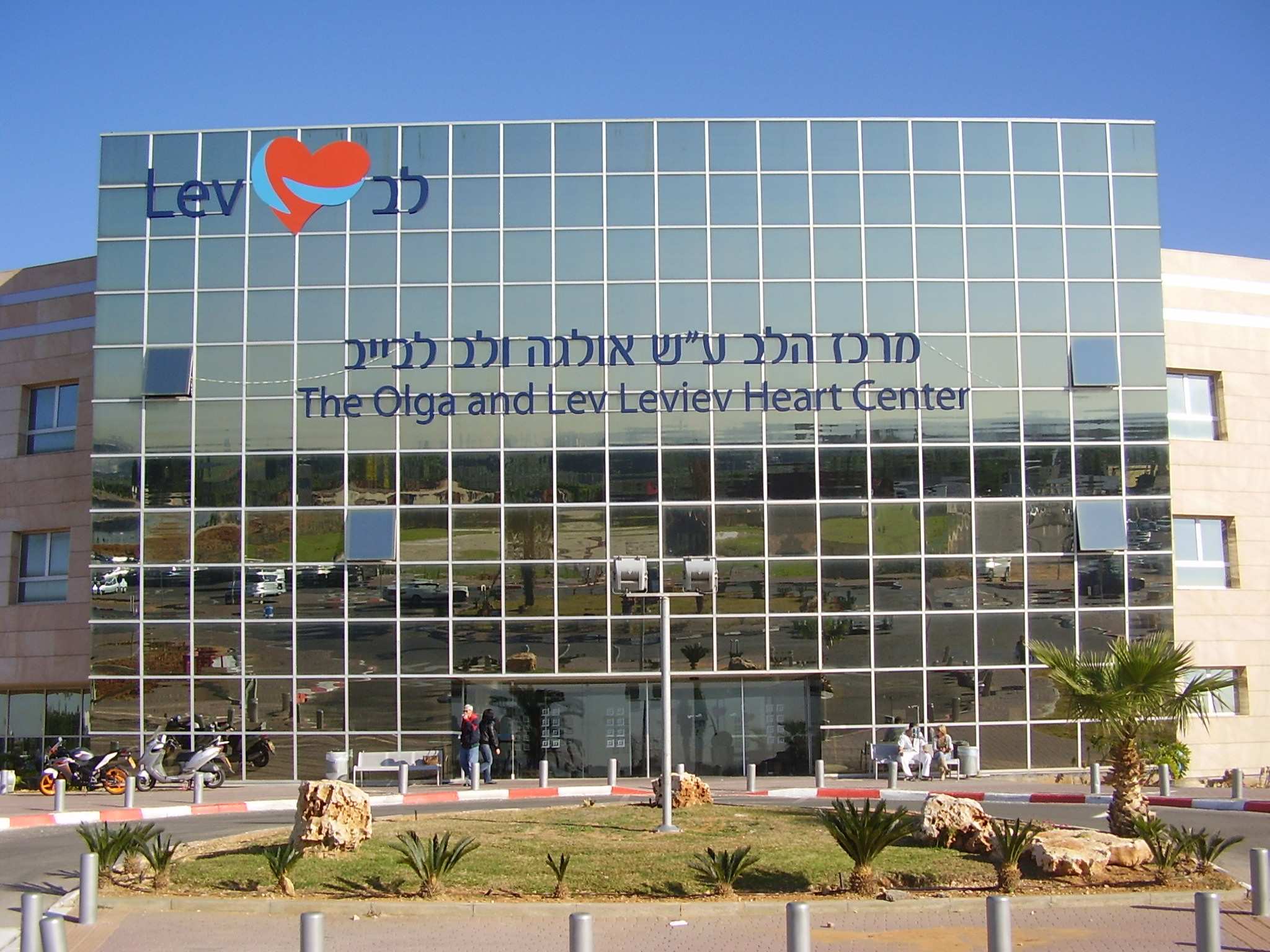
Heart Center at Sheba Medical Center

25% of clinical research in Israel is conducted at Sheba. In 2011, Sheba topped the list of Israeli hospitals for revenue acquired through research, at NIS 42.4 million, but came in second in 2012.

Scientific research at Sheba includes a study of pregnancy after transplantation of cryopreserved ovarian tissue in a patient with ovarian failure after chemotherapy; a study of alginate-based stem cell biomaterial injected into heart attack victims that may repair heart tissue; and a study showing that heavy cell phone users are subject to a higher risks of benign and malignant tumors of the salivary gland. The Israeli company Ventor Technologies developed a novel type of heart valve which can be implanted by catheterization rather than open-heart surgery at Sheba. This invention was sold to medical device maker Medtronic in 2009 for US$325 million, of which about 10% went to Sheba Medical Center.

In October 2020, the hospital piloted a rapid coronavirus test that detects protein portions of the virus and yields results within two to 15 minutes.

=== Recent Clinical Research Initiatives ===
Sheba Medical Center is engaged in a range of clinical research initiatives across various medical disciplines, with a focus on advancing patient care and contributing to global medical knowledge.

- Cardiology: Sheba's Division of Cardiology conducts Phase II, III, and IV clinical trials, adhering to Good Clinical Practice (GCP) standards. The Cardiovascular Clinical Trial Unit is renowned for its high patient recruitment in heart failure and acute coronary syndrome studies.
- Oncology: The Hemato-Oncology Division is actively involved in innovative research, including investigator-initiated studies and international pharmaceutical trials, aiming to advance cancer treatment methodologies.
- Artificial Intelligence (AI): In a recent study, Sheba researchers utilized AI to predict the risk of pulmonary embolism upon emergency room admission, facilitating earlier diagnosis and treatment.
- Data Analytics: The center launched the ADAMS Center, which uses the MDClone platform to support clinical teams in data-driven performance analysis and decision-making.

== Edmond and Lily Safra Children's Hospital ==
Established in 2002 with the support of the Edmond J. Safra Foundation, the pediatric section of Sheba Medical Center, known as the Edmond and Lily Safra Children's Hospital, offers comprehensive diagnostic and treatment services across numerous specialized clinics.

These include units for premature infants, intensive care, hemato-oncology and stem cell transplantation, surgery, Louis-Bar syndrome, radiology and imaging, oncology, gastroenterology, immunology, rheumatology, and surgery for congenital malformations. The hospital serves children from Israel, the neighboring Palestinian Authority, and other regions in the Middle East, receiving more than 60,000 patients annually. It has notably treated some of the hostages released after the Hamas terrorist attack on October 7, 2023 and was praised for its readiness to provide immediate physical and psychological care.

It also provides clinical research in various fields. Sheba Medical Center adopts a holistic approach to pediatric care, aiming to address the physical, emotional, and social needs of children and their families. In addition to medical treatment, the hospital provides support services and amenities such as playrooms, classrooms, central kitchens, and visitor centers to create a child-oriented environment. Patient rooms are equipped for accompanying parents to support comfort during hospital stays.

=== Pediatric Hemato-Oncology Treatments ===
The Pediatric Hemato-Oncology Department at Sheba Medical Center is a center for treating childhood cancers and blood disorders. The department admits approximately 1,200 pediatric oncology inpatients and manages around 4,000 outpatient visits annually.

The department includes an inpatient ward, outpatient clinic, day care unit, and a dedicated bone marrow transplantation unit. A team of healthcare professionals—including physicians, nurses, social workers, psychologists, and creative arts therapists—works collaboratively to provide integrated care and support for patients and their families.

The Pediatric Bone Marrow Transplant Unit performs around 25 procedures annually, utilizing both autologous and allogeneic transplantation techniques to treat various malignancies and blood disorders. The department is engaged in clinical research and experimental therapies, all conducted under the oversight of the hospital's ethics committee, with the goal of advancing pediatric oncology care.

== Global Patient Services ==
Sheba Medical Center facilitates medical tourism through its Global Patient Services department, which coordinates healthcare for thousands of international patients annually from over 100 countries across Europe, South America, North America and Africa. The center provides multilingual support in English, Russian, French, Portuguese, Spanish, German, Dutch and Arabic, and offers translation services to accommodate a diverse patient population.

International patients at Sheba receive the same level of medical care and access to treatments as domestic patients. Services include clinical consultations, diagnostic imaging, laboratory testing, surgical procedures, treatment planning, and rehabilitation. Each patient is supported by a coordinator and interpreter throughout their stay.

A significant number of international patients seek care for cancer-related conditions, particularly treatments involving advanced therapies such as CAR-T cell therapy and tumor-infiltrating lymphocyte (TIL) immunotherapy. The center has also provided care for individuals from Middle Eastern countries that do not have formal diplomatic ties with Israel, as part of its broader humanitarian activities.

In addition to serving international patients, Sheba offers medical services to Israeli citizens living abroad, including those without current health maintenance organization (HMO) or Kupat Cholim coverage in Israel. This access allows Israelis living abroad to obtain necessary medical care without requiring domestic insurance coverage.

== Foreign internships ==
In 2011, the hospital signed agreements with St. George's University in London and with the University of Nicosia (Cyprus) to train medical students for a fee of 25,000 euros per student and to award them MBBS degrees. Deans of several Israeli medical schools, including Yosef Mekori of the Sackler Faculty of Medicine at Tel Aviv University, and Rivka Carmi, president of the Ben-Gurion University, criticised the programme, claiming it would hurt the quality of medical education received by Israeli students and harm medical care in Israel.

== Notable staff ==
- Moshe Many
- Jacob Sadé
- Eli Schwartz
- Limor Schreibman-Sharir
- Shomron Ben-Horin

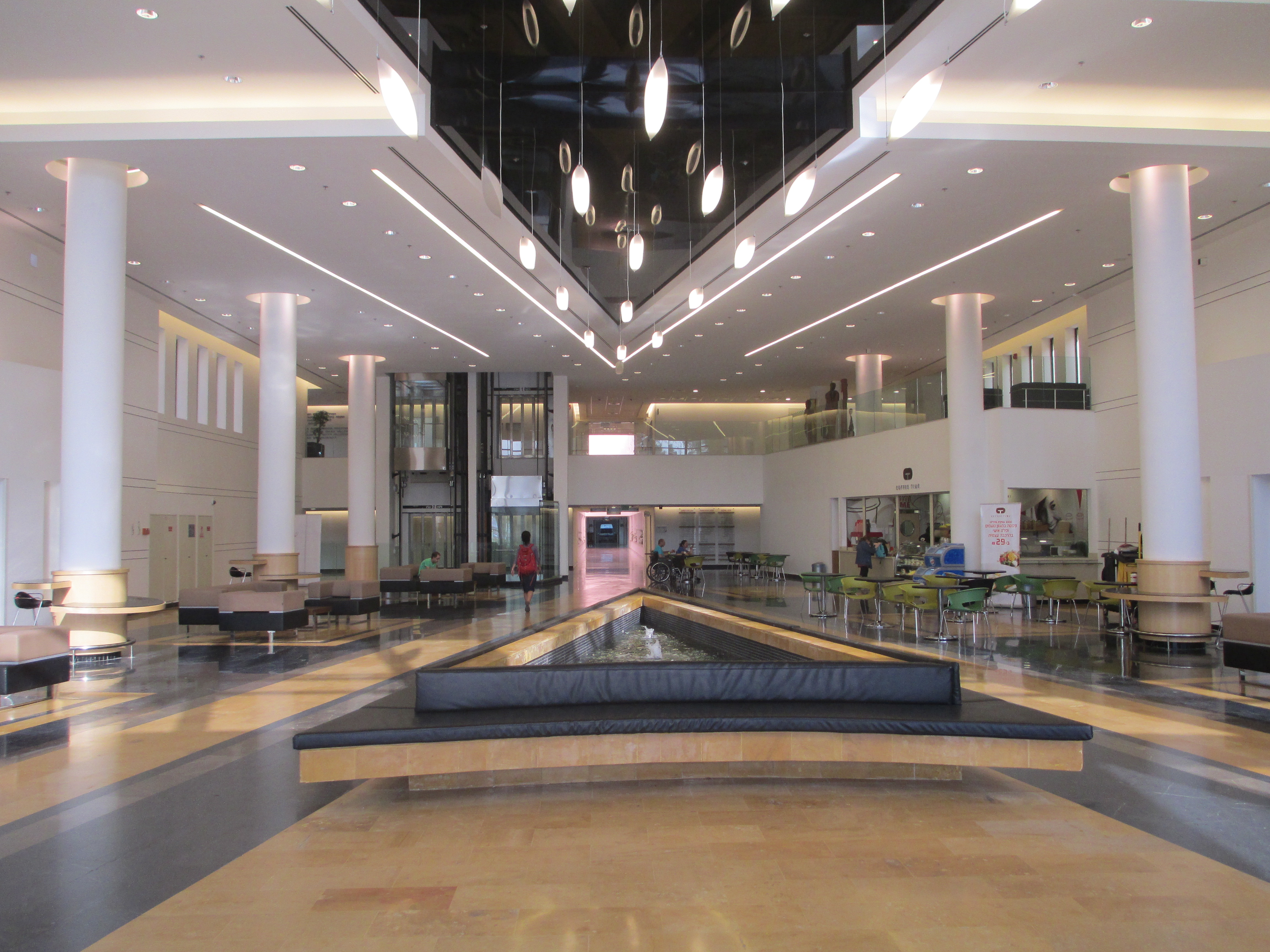
Sheba Rehabilitation Center, 2015

== Notable patients ==
- Isaias Afwerki, President of Eritrea
- Guy Sasson (born 1980), Paralympic wheelchair tennis player; Grand Slam champion
- Ariel Sharon, Prime Minister of Israel

== Controversy ==
On 12 June 2008 at 11 a.m., Sheba Medical Centre discharged a patient, a resident of Gaza, who had stolen a car in May and was being treated for injuries sustained in a car accident. Although he still needed medical attention he was handed over to the police. Two days later, he was found dead by the side of Route 443. After his body was identified, the police and hospital staff blamed each other for his death. In 2012, two Israeli police officers were convicted of negligent homicide and sentenced to two and a half years in prison. Damages were paid to the family by the police and the hospital.

In 2014, during 2014 Israel–Gaza conflict, a Palestinian nurse of the clinic posted on Facebook that “the Israel Defense Forces are war criminals, only killing innocent people, and the state is claiming [it is done] 'by mistake and we are investigating the incident.'” Hospital director Zeev Rotstein suspended the nurse for two weeks on the grounds that the statement constituted a disciplinary offense. In accordance with a labour court rule, the hospital revoked the suspension, while the nurse dropped the request for an injunction against the suspension and apologized in writing to the hospital management for the post on his Facebook page.

In 2020, an Israeli Arab, came to the clinic for a psychiatric examination. Inside the hospital, he threatened two people with a knife. After hospital security guards forcibly removed him from his car, he stabbed one guard in the head. The guards wrestled him to the ground and disarmed him but he was killed by police fire. In the wake of public protest, an investigation was ordered into the killing.

== See also ==
- List of hospitals in Israel
- Health care in Israel
