= Arnon Afek =

Israeli physician (born 1963)

Professor Arnon Afek
- ארנון אפק
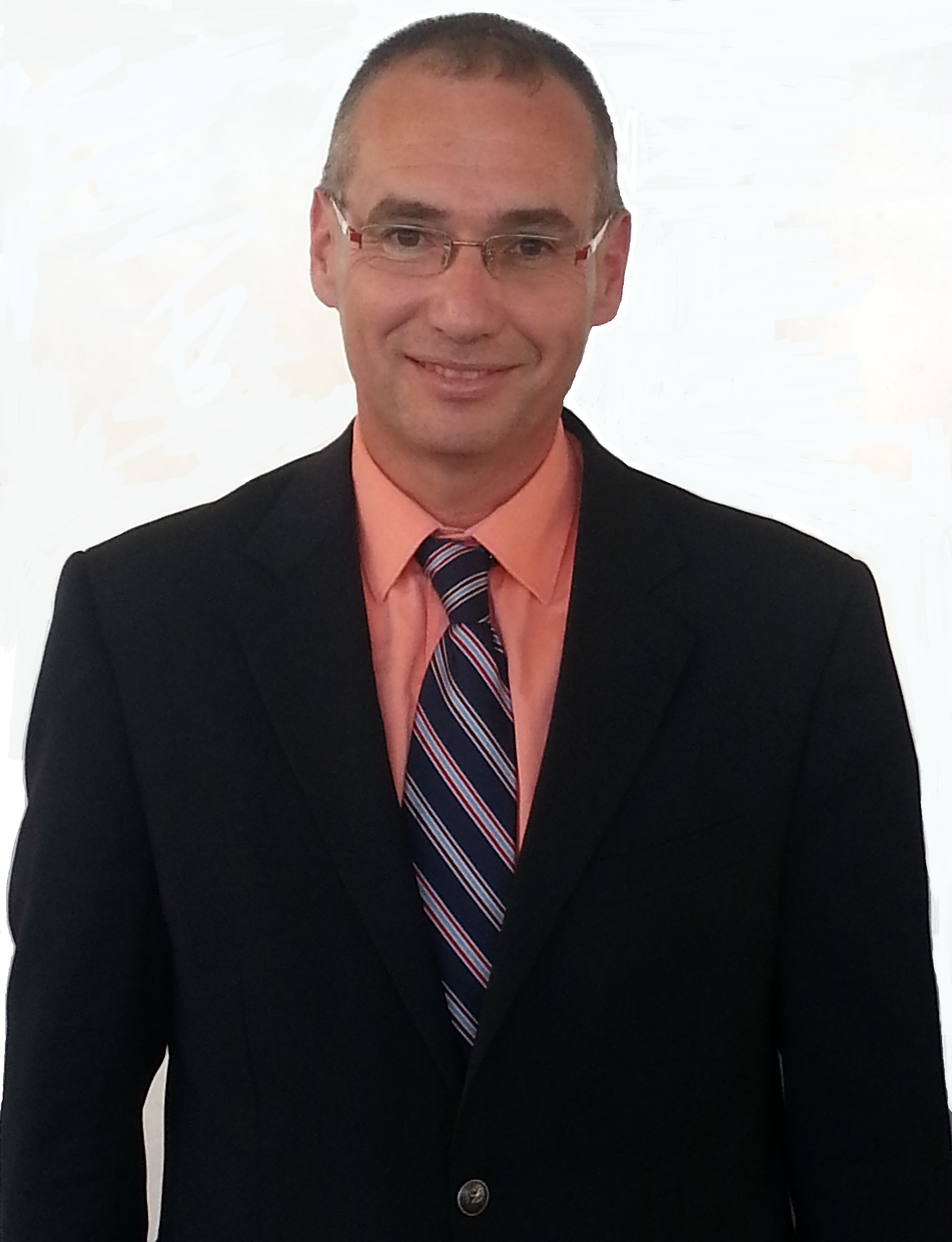
- Afek in 2014
- Born: May 18, 1963 (age 63); Haifa, Israel
- Citizenship: Israeli
- Education: Hebrew University-Hadassah Faculty of Medicine; Ben-Gurion University of the Negev
- Occupations: Physician; Pathologist; Health administrator; Academic administrator
- Years active: 1988–present
- Employers: Reichman University; Sheba Medical Center
- Organization: Ministry of Health (Israel)
- Known for: Israeli health policy reforms; Hospital management; Medical education leadership
- Title: Founding Dean, Dina Recanati School of Medicine; Director, Gertner Institute for Epidemiology and Health Policy Research; Former Director-General, Israeli Ministry of Health
- Board member of: Association of Israeli Hospital Directors; Jerusalem Medical Research Fund
- Spouse: Dr. Limor Afek
- Children: 2
- Awards: Yakir Sherut HaMedina (2019); Goldenberg Prize; Kellerman Prize; Israeli Atherosclerosis Society Prize

Arnon Afek (born 18 May 1963) is an Israeli physician, who serves as a professor of medicine and founding dean of the Dina Recanati School of Medicine at Reichman University. He serves as the head of the Cecil Taitz Chair of Anatomy at Reichman University and is currently the Director of the Gertner Institute for Epidemiology and Health Policy Research at Sheba Medical Center. Afek is a specialist in pathology and medical administration and is considered a leading figure in Israeli health policy, hospital management, and medical education. He is the founding chairman of the National Council on Pathology and Forensic Medicine. Afek received the "Yakir Sherut HaMedina" (distinguished public servant) national award.

He serves as chief medical advisor of the Israeli Medical Cannabis Unit at the Ministry of Health (Israel). Formerly, he was chairman of the Association of Hospitals' Directors and was chair of the Israel Medical Association World Fellowship. He was also a member of the Bureau of the OECD Health Committee.

Afek previously served as the 23rd director-general of the Israeli Ministry of Health (2014–2015). He has held senior leadership positions at Sheba Medical Center, including deputy director-general and director of Sheba General Hospital (2017–2025). He has chaired and served on numerous national councils and professional committees, including chair of the National Council of Forensic Medicine and Pathology. From 2011 to 2022 he served for as the director of the NY State/American MD Program, professor of public health and the Michlin Chair in the field of philosophy and history of medicine at the School of Medicine and the Coller School of Management at Tel Aviv University.

He is a visiting professor at the University of Nicosia Medical School, Cyprus.

== Education ==
Afek studied medicine at the Hebrew University-Hadassah Faculty of Medicine between 1981 and 1987. He completed his internship at Beilinson Hospital in 1988.

Between 1993 and 2000, Afek completed his residency in anatomical pathology at Sheba Medical Center.

He earned a Master of Health Administration (MHA) from Ben-Gurion University of the Negev between 2000 and 2002, graduating with distinction. Between 2002 and 2004 he completed a residency in medical administration at Sheba Medical Center and the Israeli Ministry of Health. Afek is also a graduate of the Wexner Senior Leadership Program at the Harvard Kennedy School (WSLP16).

== Career ==
=== Military service ===
Afek served in the IDF Medical Corps, where he served as the Head of the Medical Classification and Occupational Medicine Branch and as Director of the Department of Medical Administration at the headquarters of the IDF Medical Corps. He rose to the rank of Colonel.

In the reserves he serves as a member of the IDF Medical Corps Helsinki Committee.

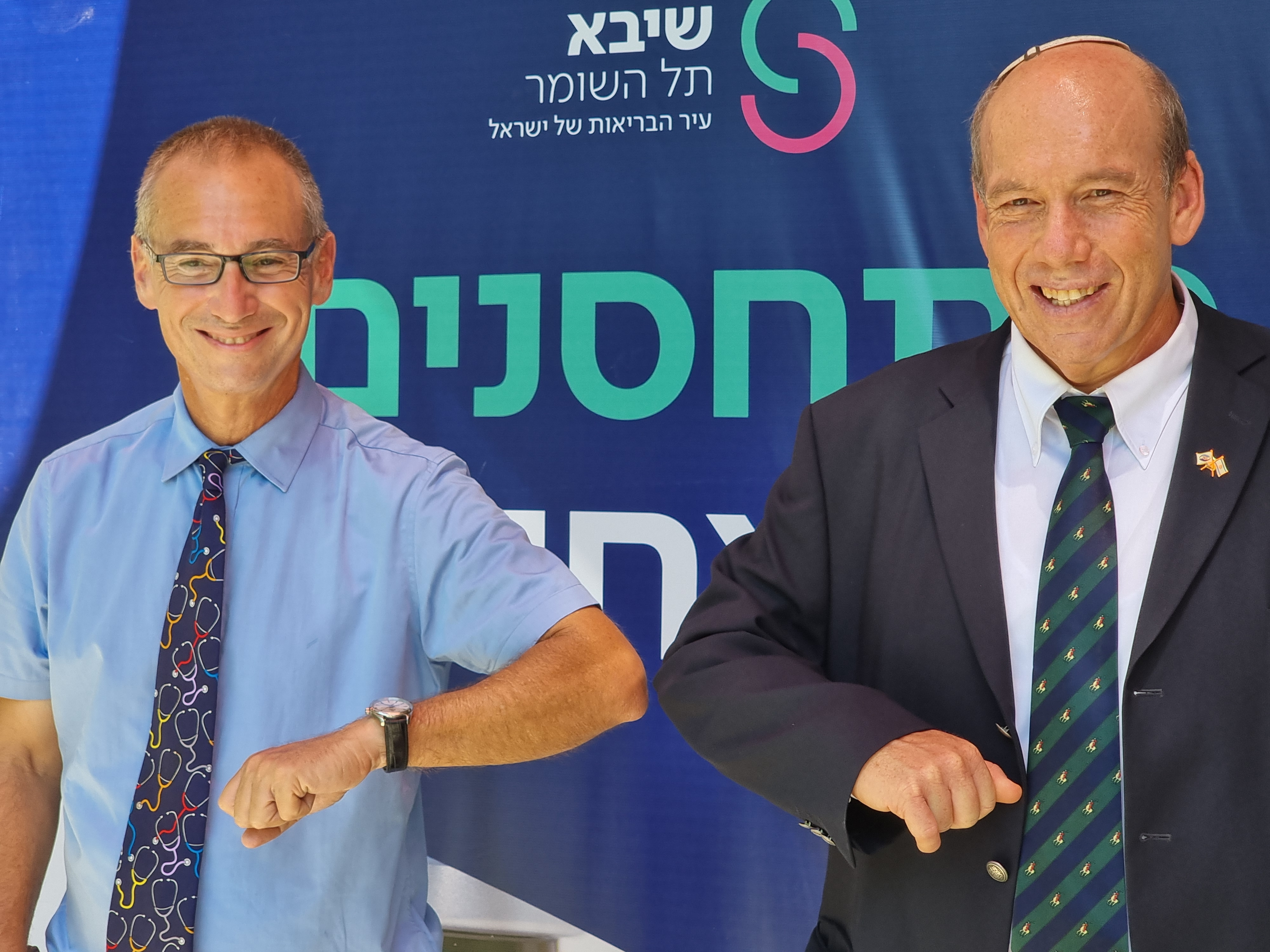
Afek with Matanyahu Englman

=== Medical and administrative career ===
In 2008, after his military service, Afek was appointed Deputy Director of Sheba Medical Center. In parallel, he also served as Sheba's Emergency Preparedness Officer.

In 2011 he won a public tender conducted by the Israel Civil Service Commission and was appointed Head of the Medical Administration (Director of the Medical Directorate) at the Ministry of Health. He assumed office on 1 January 2012, replacing Dr. Hezi Levi.

In June 2014 he was appointed Director-General of the Ministry of Health by Minister of Health Yael German, replacing Professor Ronni Gamzu. He served in the role until July 2015. During his tenure, Afek led major national reforms, including the mental health reform; the publication of national quality and transparency indicators; the development of the national NICU assessment model; and national plans for the prevention and treatment of diabetes and stroke.

He headed the inter-ministerial committee whose recommendations led to the government decision to establish the Shimon Peres Medical Center in Be'er Sheva. He also promoted the reform of medical professions in Israel (introducing physician assistants, nurse practitioners, and surgical assistants), streamlined licensing procedures for Israeli and immigrant physicians, and advanced Israel's medical cannabis reform.

Under his leadership, the Medical Administration received the Israel Civil Service Commission's Efficiency Excellence Award and the State of Israel Civil Service Improvement Team Certificate for advancing quality and service in neonatal departments. The mental health reform he led was praised by the Supreme Court of Israel as "professional and thorough."

Following the end of his tenure at the Ministry of Health, Afek returned to Sheba Medical Center and resumed his role as Deputy Director-General and acting Director of Sheba General Hospital. In addition, he has been responsible for medical staff and academic affairs at the hospital.

In 2018 he chaired the Council for Higher Education committee tasked with evaluating the medical school program at Ariel University, which led to the establishment of the Adelson School of Medicine.

In July 2019 he was appointed Acting Chief Medical Advisor of the Medical Cannabis Unit at the Ministry of Health.

In June 2020 the Tel Aviv District Labor Court recognized his diabetes as an occupational injury caused by work-related stress during his tenure as Director-General of the Ministry of Health.

Afek chaired the committees on medical services and disability assessments for Israel Defense Forces veterans as part of the national "Nefesh Achat" ("One Soul") reform.

=== Academic career ===
He has served as a full professor of public health and a member of the Faculty Council at the Sackler Faculty of Medicine of Tel Aviv University, and since 1994, as an associate professor in its Department of pathology. Between 2011 and 2022 he headed the American medical program (New York State/American MD Program) at Tel Aviv University and was a member of the faculty's academic leadership board.

He teaches in the Department of Emergency and Disaster Management in the School of Public Health at Tel Aviv University.

Since 2018 he has lectured in the International MBA Program in Healthcare Innovation and Entrepreneurship at the Arison School of Business at Reichman University.

Afek is a full professor at Reichman University and serves as the Founding Dean of the Dina Recanati School of Medicine, where he also holds the Cecil Taitz Chair of Anatomy.

He is also an adjunct professor at the University of Nicosia Medical School in Cyprus.

Afek has delivered lectures at major medical conferences worldwide, including the John M. Eisenberg International Lecture at the 18th Annual International Symposium on Health Policy of The Commonwealth Fund.

== Research ==
Afek has co-authored more than 200 peer-reviewed articles in international medical journals. His research has focused on the relationship between obesity and additional risk factors and morbidity from cardiovascular disease, vascular disease, diabetes, and cancer in adolescents. He has also studied the immunopathogenesis of atherosclerosis. As of October 2026, his h-index is 70.

In 2017, he published two articles in The Lancet about "Health in Israel."

As a researcher, he has received the Goldberg Prize and the Kellerman Prize.

== Committees and Public Activities ==
Year	Position / Activity
2010	Chair, Committee on Medical Tourism; Member, IDF Medical Corps Helsinki Committee
2011	Member, Clinical Teaching Committee, Sackler Faculty of Medicine, Tel Aviv University
2012	Member, National Health Council; Chair, Council Organization Committee; Chair, Inter-Ministerial Committee for the National Child Safety Program; Chair, National Committee for Hospital Quality Indicators; Member, Inter-Ministerial Price Committee; Chair, Subcommittee on Price Determination
2013	Chair, Committee Evaluating the Introduction of the Physician Assistant Role
2014	Chair, Committee for Planning the Medical Response in the Negev; Member, German Health Reform Committee; Member, Subcommittees on Medical Tourism and “Multiple Hats”; Chair, Committee Reviewing the Dying Patient Act; Chair, National Committee for Rare Diseases
2015	Member, Bureau of the OECD Health Committee
2018	Chair, Council for Higher Education Committee reviewing the Ariel University medical school program; Chair, Israel Medical Association World Fellowship
2019	Chair, Monitoring Committee for the establishment of the Ariel University medical school; Co-Chair, Association of Israeli Hospital Management
2020	Member, National Coronavirus Professional Taskforce led by Prof. Ronni Gamzu
2021	Chair, Subcommittees for Medical Services and Disability Assessments for IDF Veterans; Member, Steering Committee of the “Nefesh Achat” reform
2022	Chair, National Committee for the Development of Intensive Care; Chair, Steering Committee for the Geriatric Hospitalization Reform

== Awards and recognition ==
- 1988 – Goldberg (Goldenberg) Prize
- 1997 – Kellerman Prize
- 2005 – IDF Technology & Logistics Directorate Award
- 2007 – Team Improvement Award for promoting voluntary military service and improving dental care for combat soldiers
- 2017 – Certificate of Appreciation from the Israeli Patients' Rights Association
- 2019 – "Yakir Sherut HaMedina" (Distinguished Public Servant) Award

== Personal life ==
Afek is married to Dr. Limor Afek, a pediatric dentist, and they have two children and a granddaughter.
