= Medical Corps (Israel) =

- חֵיל הָרְפוּאָה
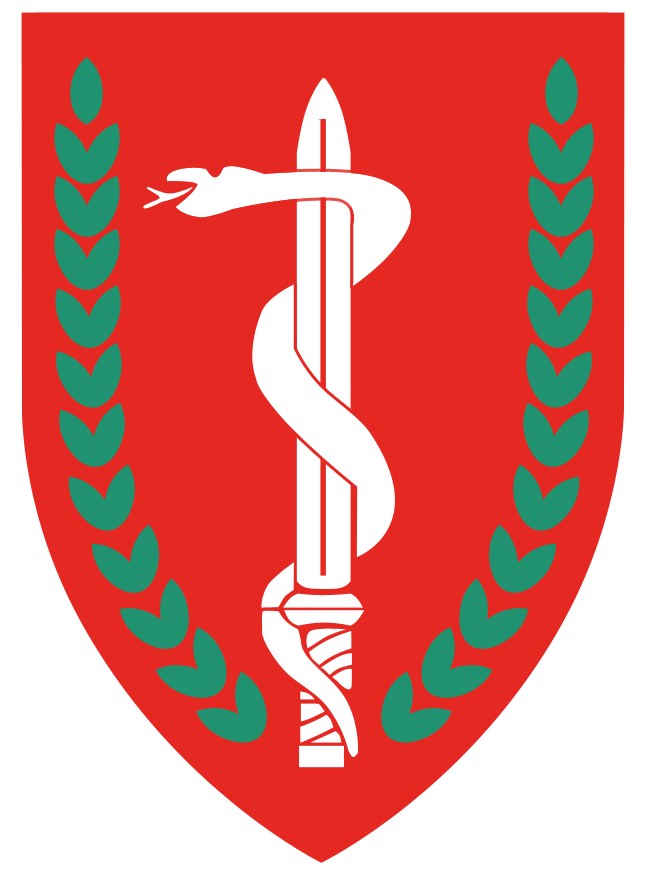
- Active: 1947–present
- Country: Israel
- Allegiance: Israel Defense Forces

Commanders
- Current commander: Tat Aluf Avi Benov

Insignia
- Flag

The Israeli Medical Corps (Hebrew: חֵיל הָרְפוּאָה, Heil HaRfu'a) is a corps responsible for providing healthcare services and medical treatment to the members of Israel Defense Forces.

== History ==
During wars or emergencies, the Medical Corps assumes authority over the civilian healthcare system in Israel. The corps attends to the planning, organization, and supervision of the preparedness of the healthcare system to face crises. As of 2023, the corps is headed by Brigadier General Prof. Elon Glassberg. Its headquarters are located in Tel HaShomer.

== Structure ==
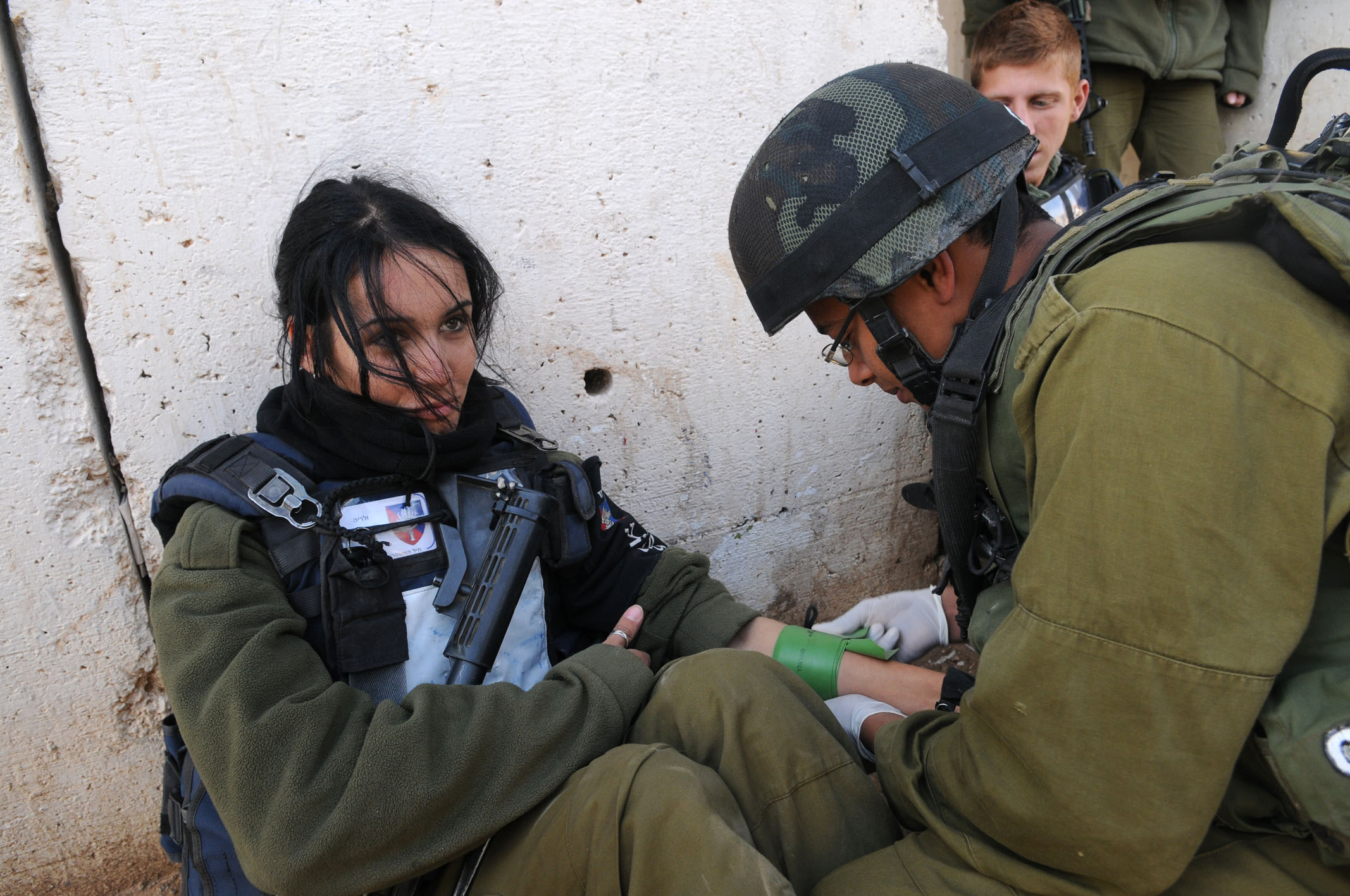
A soldier receives medical aid

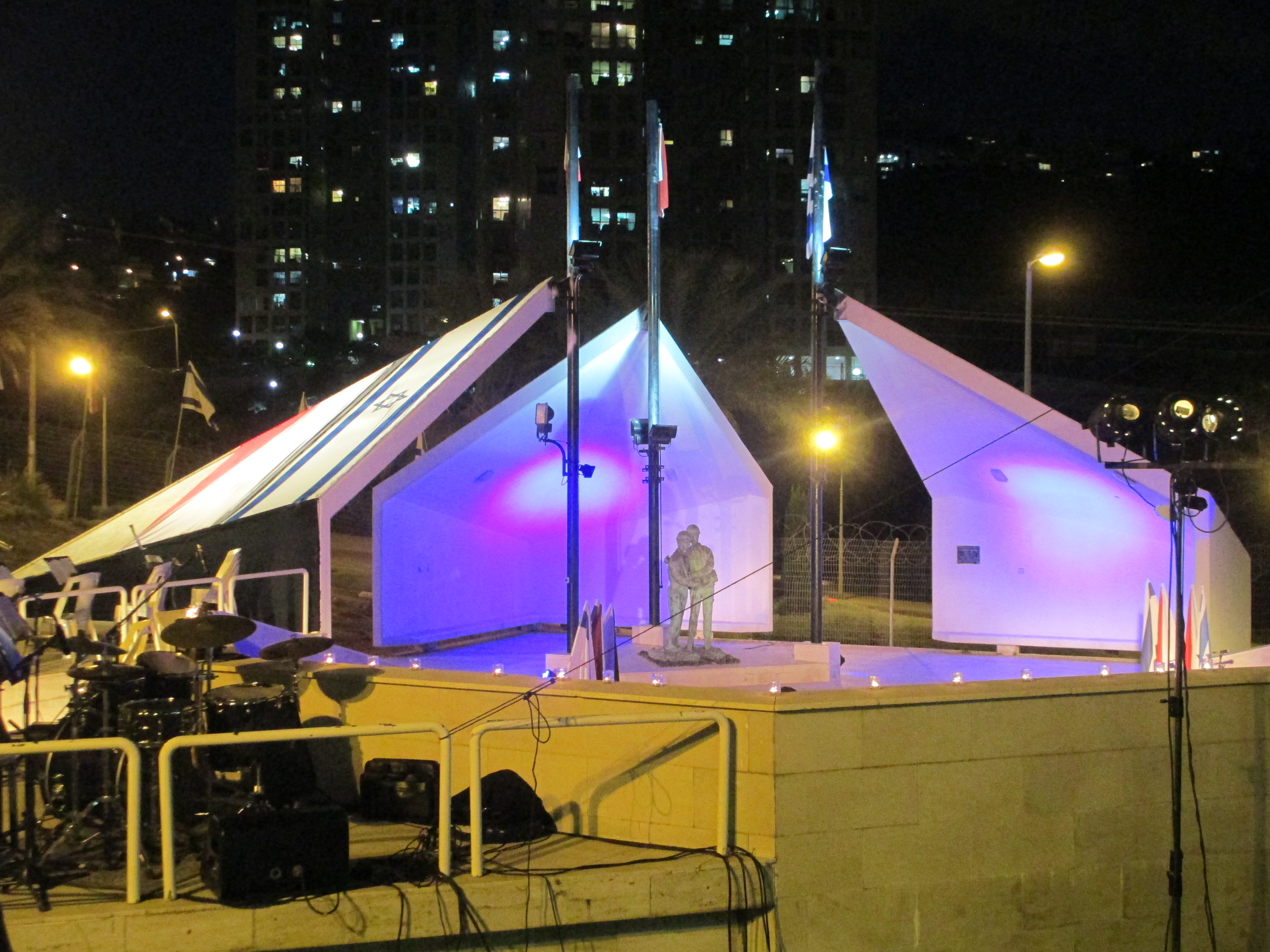
Memorial in Haifa

The Medical Corps is divided into six brigade- or battalion-level units:

- Medical Organization Division
- Medical Division
- Bahad 10 – The training base and Military Medicine Academy
- Mental Health Division
- Dental Health Division
- Medical Services Center, headed by a colonel, is the corps's main operational unit, consisting of four regional medical service centres.

== Commanders ==
Name	Term
Lieutenant Colonel Dr. Chaim Sheba	1948–1949
Colonel Dr. Avraham Atzmon	1949–1956
Colonel Prof. Baruch Padeh	1956–1962
Brigadier General Dr. Eliyahu Gilon	1962–1967
Brigadier General Dr. Reuven Adler	1967–1972
Brigadier General Dr. Moshe Cordoba	1972–1975
Brigadier General Prof. Dan Michaeli	1975–1979
Brigadier General Prof. Eran Dolev	1979–1983
Brigadier General Dr. Moshe Revach	1983–1987
Brigadier General Prof. Yehuda Danon	1987–1991
Brigadier General Dr. Michael Weiner	1991–1994
Brigadier General Dr. Joshua Shemer	1994–1997
Brigadier General Prof. Aryeh Eldad	1997–1999
Brigadier General Dr. Giora Martinovich	1999–2002
Brigadier General Dr. Hezi Levi	2002–2007
Brigadier General Dr. Nachman Ash	2007–2011
Brigadier General Prof. Yitshak Kreiss	2011–2014
Brigadier General Dr. Dudu Dagan	2014–2017
Brigadier General Prof. Tarif Bader	2017–2020
Brigadier General Prof. Elon Glassberg	2020–2024
Brigadier General Dr. Zivan Aviad-Beer	2024-present
Brigader General Dr. Avi Benov	2026–present

== See also ==
- Magen David Adom
