= Joshua Shemer =

Israeli professor and doctor

- יהושע שמר
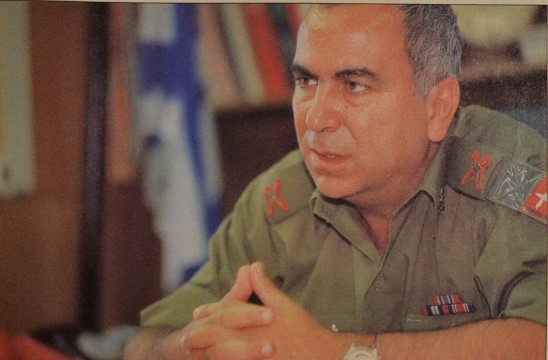
- Born: December 7, 1949 (age 76); Israel
- Education: Hadassah Medical School
- Occupation: Professor of Internal Medicine
- Employer: Tel Aviv University

Joshua Shemer (Hebrew: יהושע שמר; born 7 December 1949) is an Israeli professor, doctor, and chair of the Assuta Medical Centers network in Israel, currently building and developing the new advanced highly sophisticated public hospital in the city of Ashdod, the first of its kind built in Israel in the past forty years. He formerly served as Director General of Maccabi Healthcare Services, providing health services to 24% of the Israeli population. Shemer served as director general of the Ministry of Health and Surgeon General of the Israel Defense Forces Military Health Corps, holding the rank of brigadier general.

== Biography ==
Shemer was born in Israel. He received his medical degree from The Hebrew University Hadassah Medical School in Jerusalem. He is a full professor of Internal medicine at Tel Aviv University and is Board-certified in both internal medicine and health administration.

He was promoted to Chief Medical Officer of the Northern Command from 1987-1989.

== Professional career ==
Dr. Shemer is the director of the Israeli Center for technology assessment in Health Care at the Gertner Institute for Epidemiology and Health Policy Research at Tel HaShomer.

He was Director of the School of Public health at the Sackler Faculty of Medicine at Tel Aviv University, lecturer at the Faculty of Management and head of the Multi-disciplinary Program for Emergency and Disaster Management at the Sackler Faculty of Medicine, Tel Aviv university.

== Other activities ==
Shemer was a member of the board of directors of El Al Airlines from 2009-2018. He served as the Assistant Director General of the Ministry of Health, and he founded and served as the Head of Medical Technology and Infrastructure Administration from 1997-2000.

== Books edited ==
- Shemer J, Shoenfeld Y. Terror and Medicine. Pabst Science Publishers, Lengerich, Germany, 2003 (ISBN 3-89967-018-3, 1-59326-064-4 (USA)).
- Shemer J, Barel V. Injury in Israel. The Hebrew University Magnes Press, Jerusalem, 2002 (ISBN 965-493-130-3).
- Chinitz D, Cohen J, Co-editors: Shamai N, Shemer J, Siebzheiner M.
- Governments and Health Systems – Implications of Differing Involvements.
- John Wiley & Sons Ltd. Chichester, 1998 (ISBN 0-471-98199-0).
- Shemer J, Schersten T. Technology Assessment in Health Care: from theory to practice. Gefen Publishing House Ltd, Jerusalem 1995 (ISBN 965-229-122-6).
- Shemer J, Vienonen M. Reforming Health Care Systems. Gefen Publishing House Ltd, Jerusalem 1995 (ISBN 965-229-121-8).
- Danon Y, Shemer J. Clinical Warfare Medicine – Aspects and Perspectives from Persian Gulf War. Gefen Publishing House Ltd, Jerusalem 1994 (ISBN 965-229-103-X).
