= Zivan =

Zivan may refer to:

- Zivan, Iran, village in Iran
- Živan, Slavic-language masculine given name
- Zivan (Hebrew: זיוון), Hebrew-language masculine given name:
  - Zivan Aviad-Beer, general of the IDF, military physician
