= Nachman Ash =

Israeli physician (born 1961)

- נחמן אש
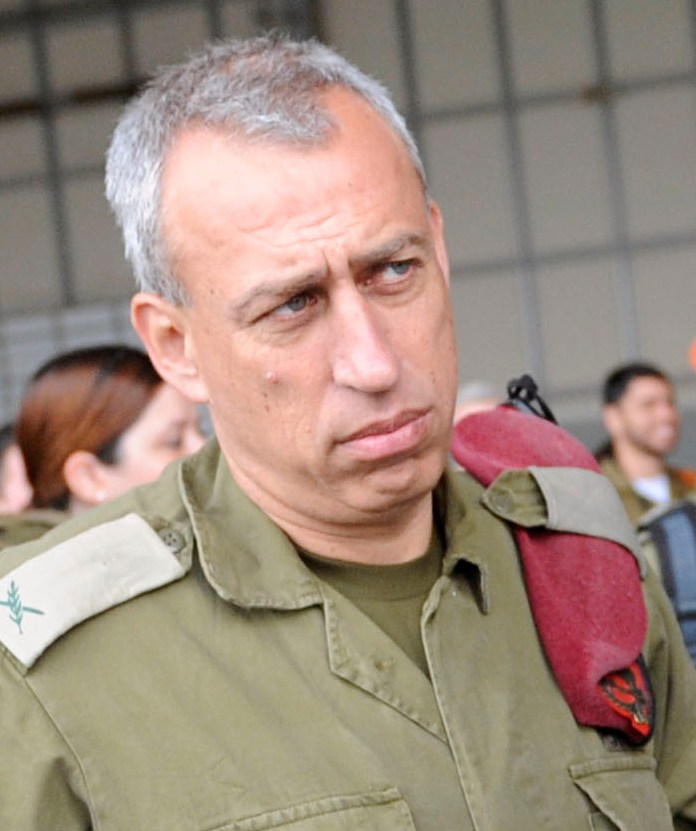
- Ash in April 2012.

Coronavirus Commissioner
- Incumbent
- Assumed office November 15, 2020
- Preceded by: Ronni Gamzu

Personal details
- Born: 1961 (age 64–65) Petah Tikva, Israel
- Education: Tel Aviv University

Nachman Ash (Hebrew: נחמן אש; born 1961) is an Israeli physician who was the director-general of the Ministry of Health.

== Early life and education ==
Nachman Ash was born in 1961.

Ash received his medical degree from the Sackler Faculty of Medicine at Tel Aviv University in 1986. In 1997, he completed a residency in internal medicine at the Sheba Medical Center.

== Career ==
Ash served as the chief of the Israel Defense Forces Medical Corps from 2007 to 2011.

=== Coronavirus ===
Ash was appointed Israel's Coronavirus Commissioner by Prime Minister, Benjamin Netanyahu, on November 15, 2020, succeeding Ronni Gamzu.

In April 2021, Ash expressed concern that Israel did not have enough COVID-19 vaccines to provide its population with a third dose.

On June 28, 2021, Ash was announced as the next Director-General of the Ministry of Health, succeeding Chezy Levy.
