= Revach =

Revach (Hebrew: רווח) is a surname of Hebrew origin. Notable people with the surname include:

- Moshe Revach, Israeli physician, chairman of Israel's National Trauma Board
- Shula Revach (born 1944), Israeli film and theater actress, playwright, director, acting
- Ze'ev Revach (1940–2025), Israeli comedian, actor and filmmaker
- Uri Revach (born 1971), Israeli journalist

== See also ==
- Ruah (similar spelling in Hebrew: רוח)
