= Mordechai Shani =

Israeli physician

- מרדכי שני
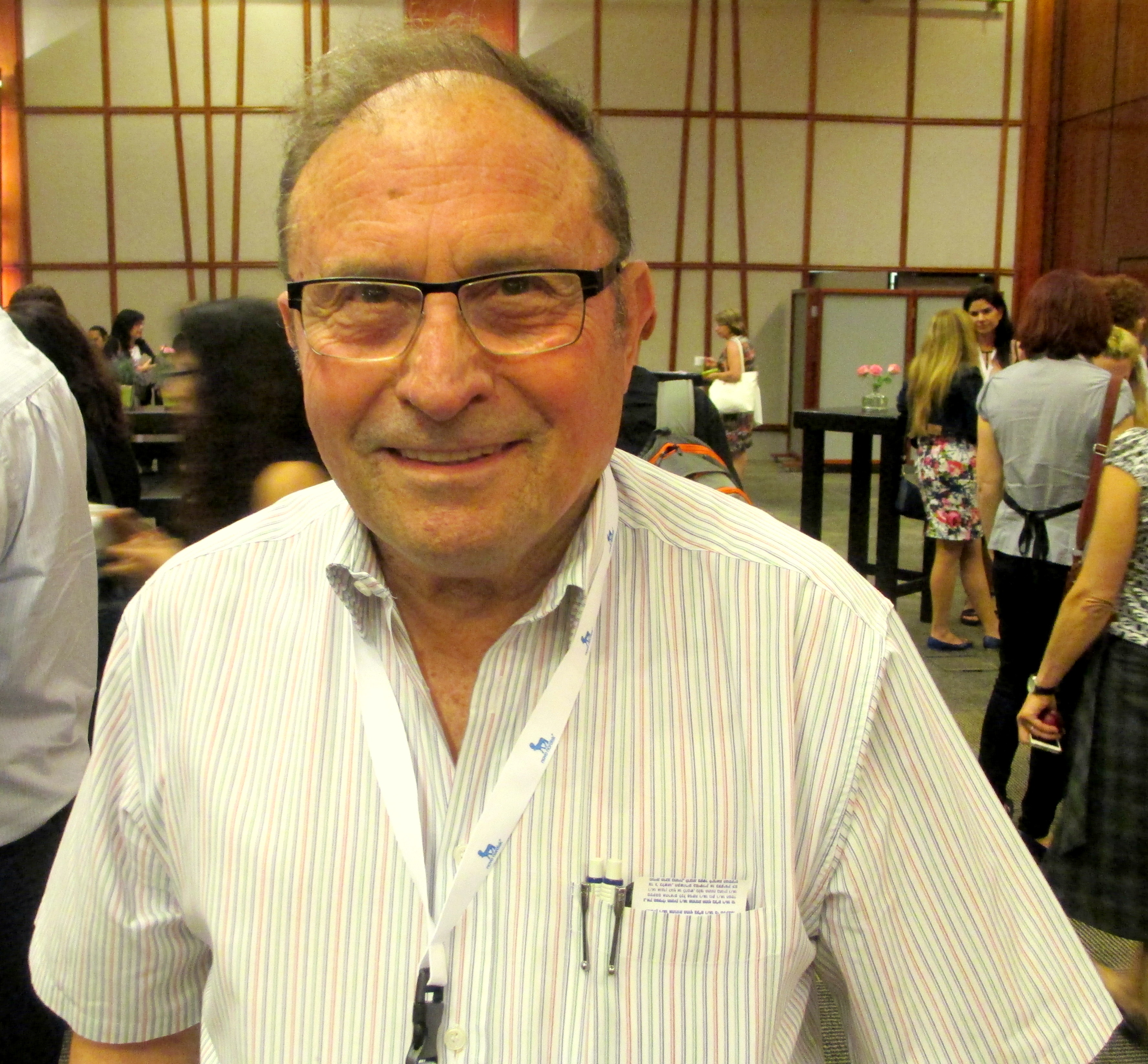
- Education: Hebrew University of Jerusalem
- Occupations: Physician, university professor

Mordechai Shani (Hebrew: מרדכי שני) is an Israeli physician. He is Professor of Healthcare Systems at Tel Aviv University. He served as the Director General of the Sheba Medical Center. He was the recipient of the Israel Prize in 2009.

== Biography ==
Mordechai Shani received an M.D. from the Hadassah Medical School at the Hebrew University of Jerusalem.

== Medical and academic career ==
He has served as the Director General of the Sheba Medical Center for thirty-three years. He also helped found the School for Health Policy at Tel Aviv University in 2005, and served as its Head until 2009. He served as the Director of the Israeli Ministry of Health in 1979 and again from 1993 to 1994. He was instrumental in the passing of a national healthcare insurance policy for Israeli citizens.

He is Professor of Healthcare Systems at Tel Aviv University. He is also the Founder and Chairman of the Management Committee of the Gertner Institute for Epidemiology and Health Policy Research.

== Awards and recognition ==
In 2009, he was awarded the Israel Prize from the State of Israel for 'Lifetime Achievement.' The prize was met with controversy, as an advocacy group accused Shani of working for a private corporation in Hungary, which he denied.
