= Ruah =

Ruah (Hebrew: רוח) is a surname of Hebrew origin. Notable people with the surname include:

- Daniela Ruah (born 1983), Portuguese-American actress from the NCIS Los Angeles TV series
- Judah Bento Ruah (1892–1958), Portuguese engineer, soldier and photographer
- Maurice Ruah (born 1971), Venezuelan tennis player

== See also ==
- Revach (similar spelling in Hebrew: רווח)
- Rûaħ or ruach, a Hebrew word meaning ‘breath, spirit’
