= Zivan Aviad-Beer =

Brigadier General Zivan Aviad Beer
- זיוון אביעד-בר
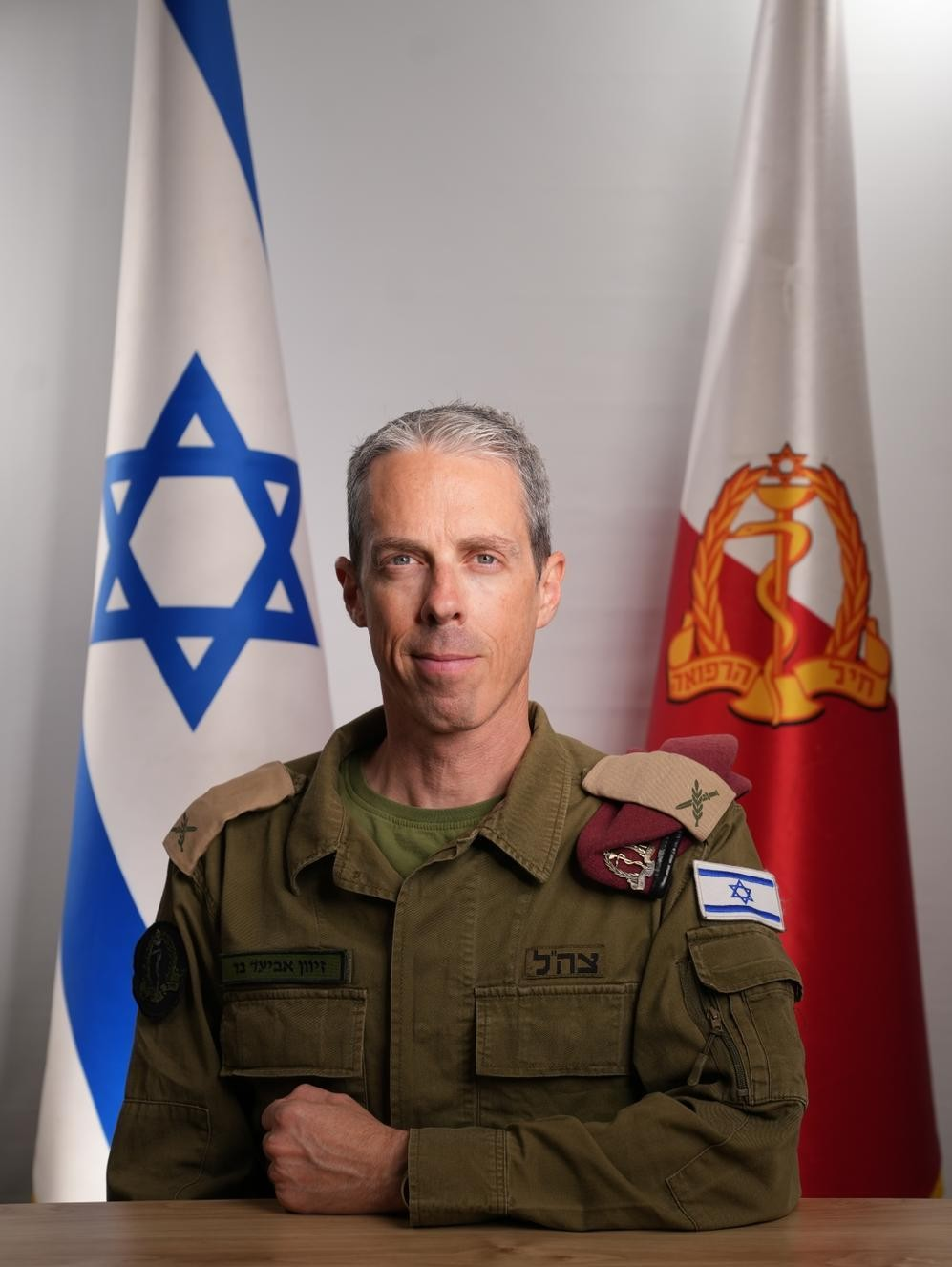
- Brig. Gen. Zivan Aviad Beer
- Born: Israel
- Education: Hebrew University of Jerusalem (MD); Ben-Gurion University of the Negev (MHA); Tel Aviv University (MBA)
- Spouse: Erez
- Children: 2
- Military career
- Allegiance: Israel
- Branch: Israel Defense Forces
- Service years: 2000–present
- Rank: Brigadier General
- Unit: IDF Medical Corps
- Commands: Chief Medical Officer of the IDF
- Conflicts: Second Lebanon War, 2023 Iron Swords War

Zivan Aviad Beer (Hebrew: זיוון אביעד בר) is a Brigadier General in the Israel Defense Forces (IDF). He currently serves as the Surgeon General and Chief Medical Officer of the IDF Medical Corps. He is a military physician specializing in internal medicine and has held a range of operational, clinical, and strategic leadership positions within the Israeli military medical system.

== Biography ==
Beer holds an MD from Tel Aviv University, is board-certified in internal medicine, and completed his residency at Ichilov Hospital.

=== Military career ===
Aviad Beer began his military medical service as the medical officer for the Golani Reconnaissance Battalion during the Second Lebanon War. He completed internship at Sheba Hospital and residency at Ichilov Hospital. He later served as the Chief Medical Officer of the Golani Brigade.

He served as the Head of the Medical Screening Branch, overseeing medical assessments across the IDF. In June 2020, Beer was appointed Medical Commander of the Southern Command.

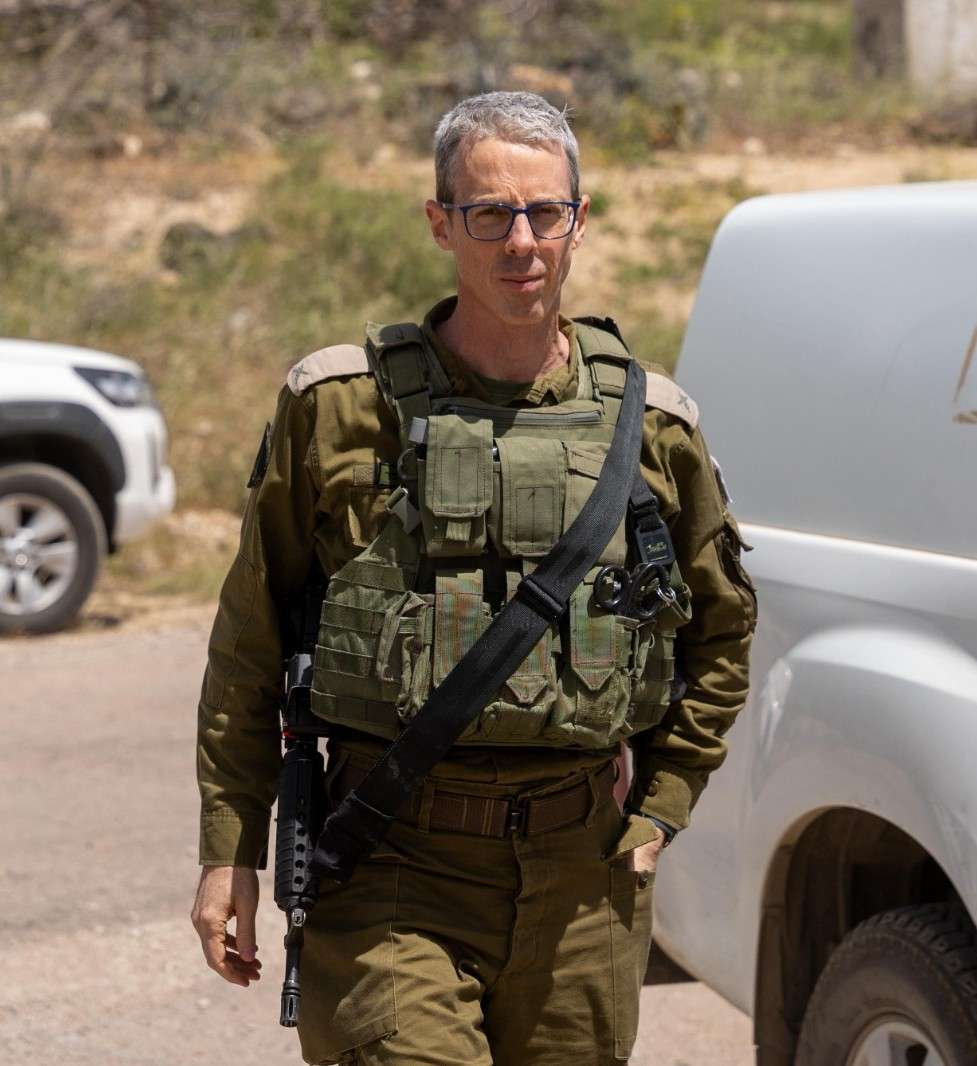
SG Field Visit

During the 2023 Iron Swords War, Beer directed emergency medical operations in the Gaza Strip, implementing the field care model from 2021, improving survival rates. In January 2024, he became Commander of the Medical Services Center, managing the IDF's internal healthcare system.

On 10 July 2024, he was promoted to the rank of Brigadier General and assumed the position of Surgeon General of the IDF Medical Corps. Despite long evacuation distances and operational complexity, the Medical Corps maintained the same casualty survival rates as in Gaza, with aerial evacuation times averaging one hour.

Alongside the focus on saving lives on the battlefield, Dr. Aviad Beer brought the field of mental health to the forefront of the Medical Corps' efforts. During his tenure, mental health officers were, for the first time, embedded within the combat zones in Gaza and Lebanon to provide immediate care and to equip commanders with tools for handling complex incidents and combat stress responses among soldiers.

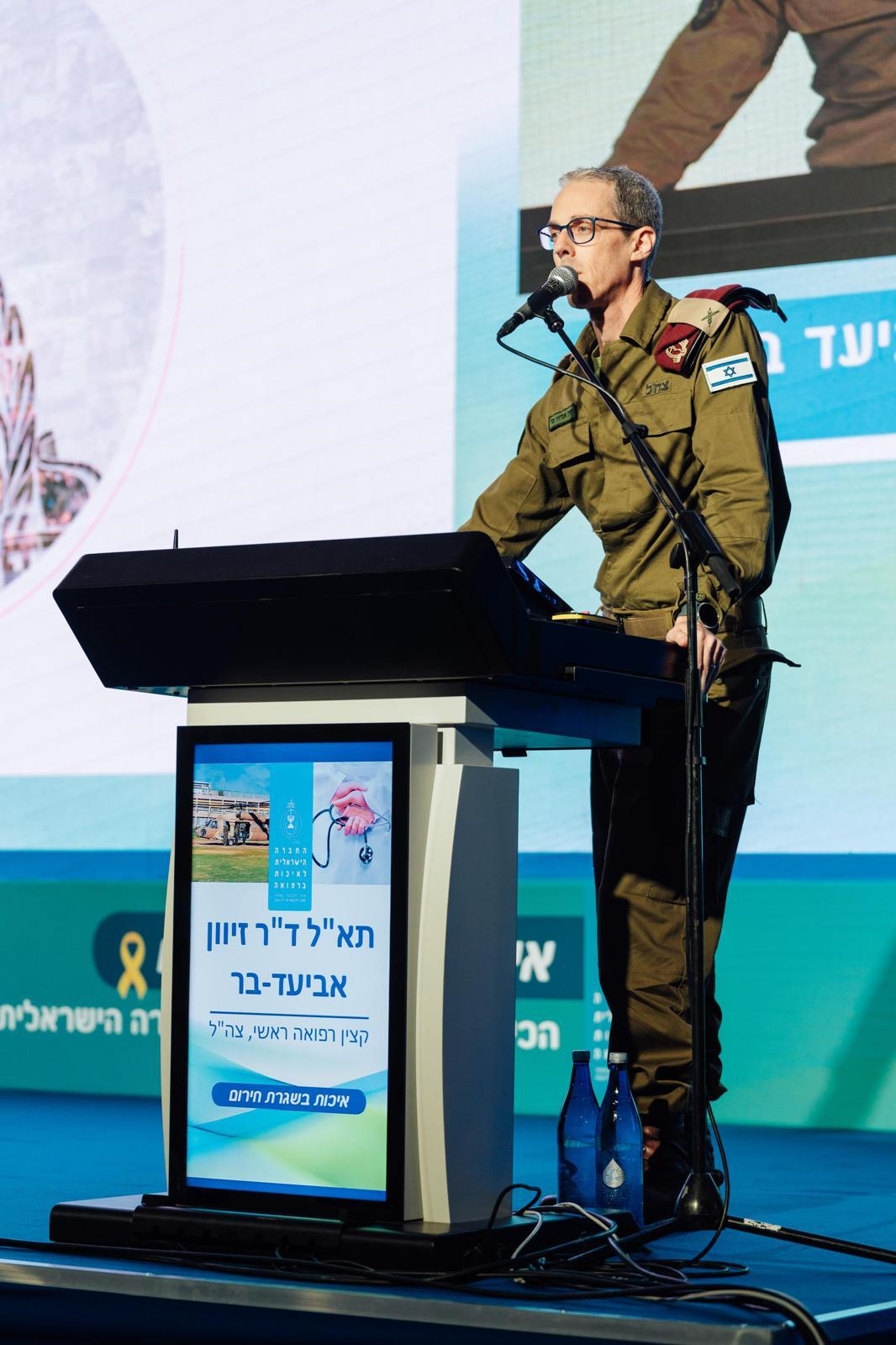
Conference of the Israeli Society for Quality in Medicine, September 2024, Tel Aviv

In addition, the Medical Corps implemented a policy of conducting preparatory talks with soldiers before combat and structured debriefing sessions with combat teams during recovery breaks. Another strategic vector he led was systematic operational debriefing and learning, emphasizing the rapid application of lessons learned and continuous adaptation throughout the war.

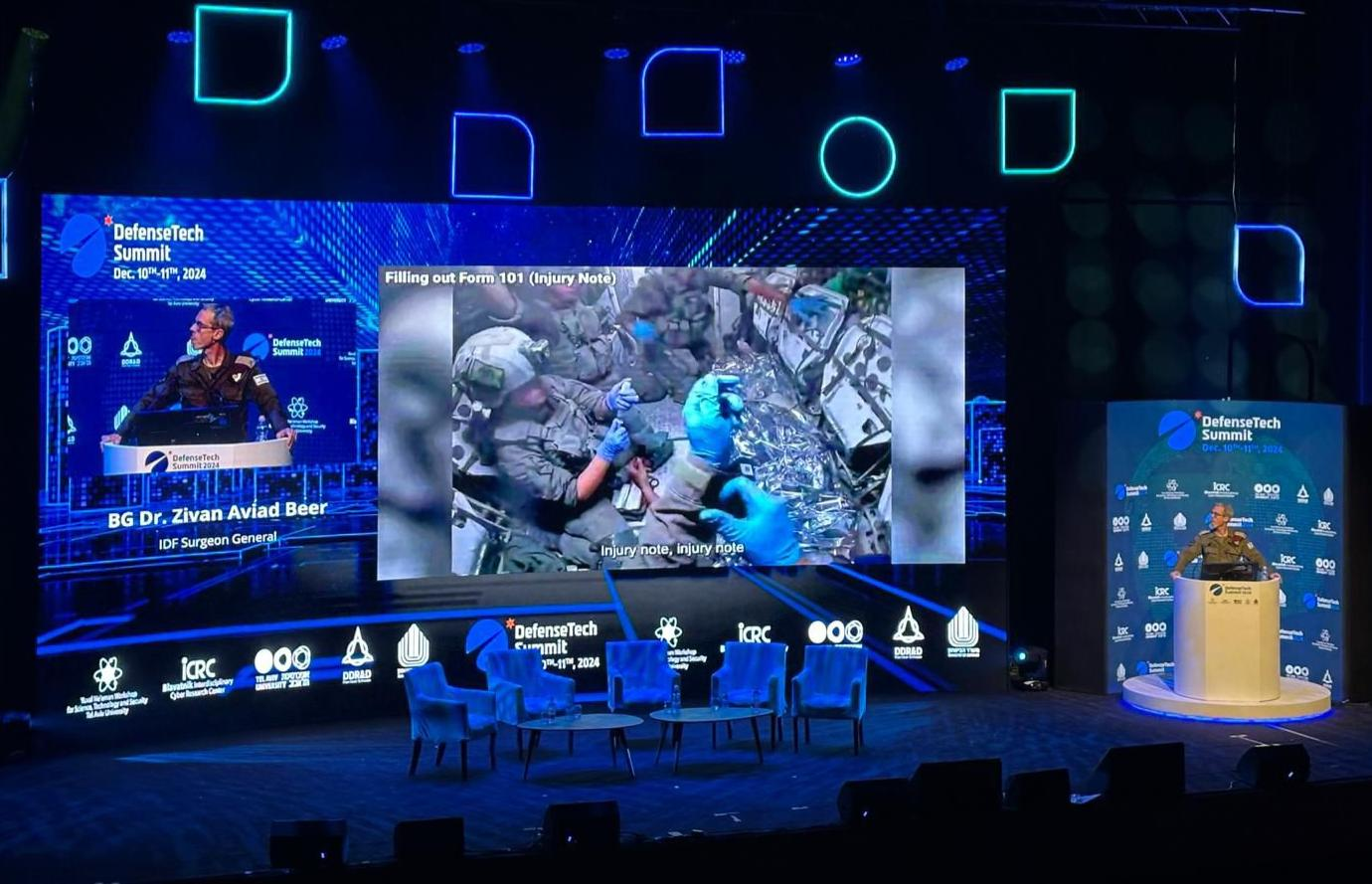
Brig. Gen. Dr. Zivan Aviad Beer speaking at the DefenseTech Summit 2024

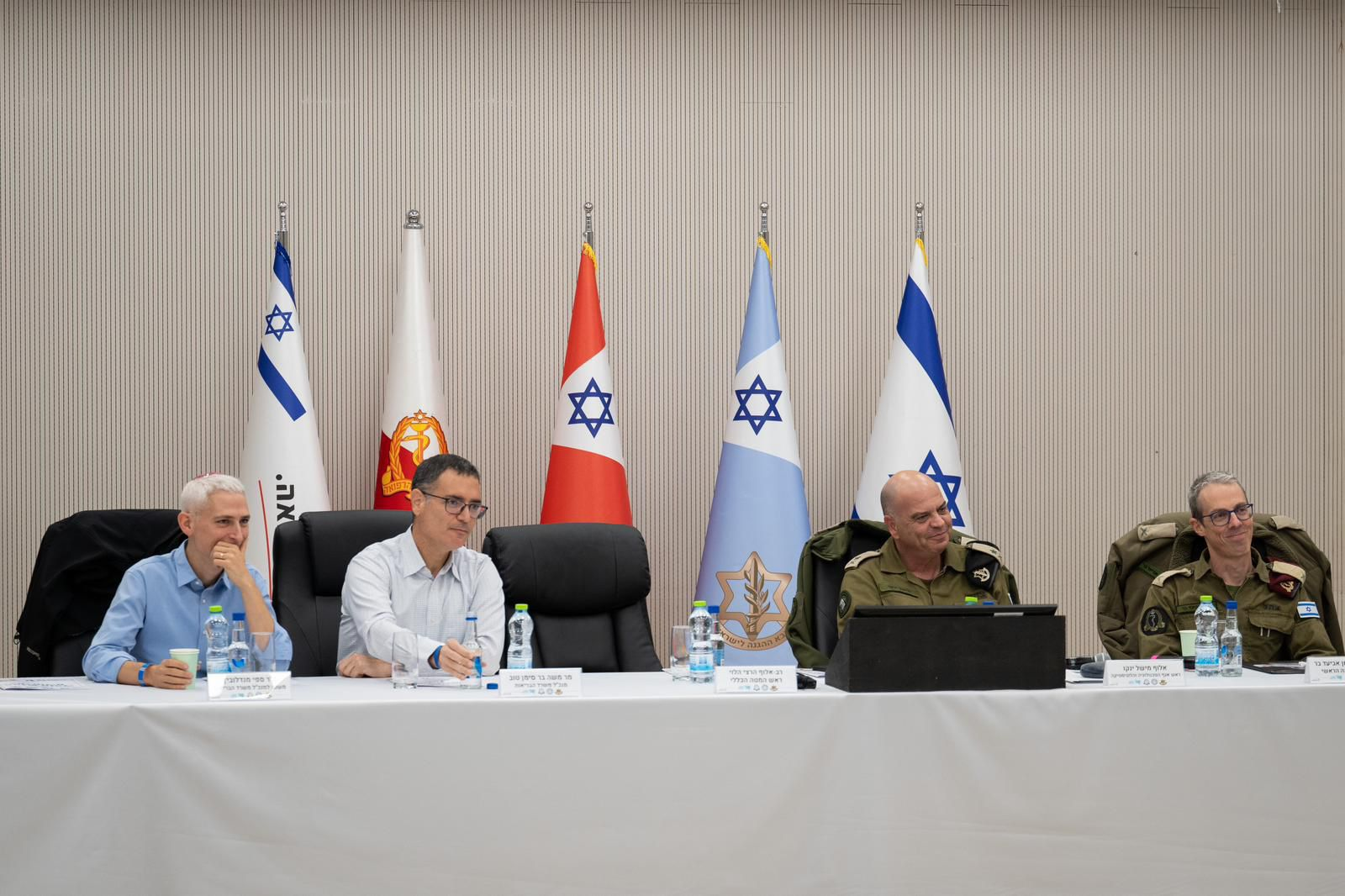
Surgeon General together with Health Ministry Director and Maj. Gen. Michel Yanko, at the 2024 IDF-Hospital Directors Conference

During the operations for the return of hostages to Israel, Brigadier General Dr. Zivan Aviad-Beer, in his role as Surgeon General of the Israel Defense Forces, led the medical operation for the reception and accompaniment of the hostages released that day. As part of the operation, the Medical Corps received twenty living hostages, and the corps’ medical teams were the first to meet them upon their arrival in Israel. Medical personnel provided initial treatment, continuous physical and mental health support, and escorted the hostages until their transfer to hospitals across the country.

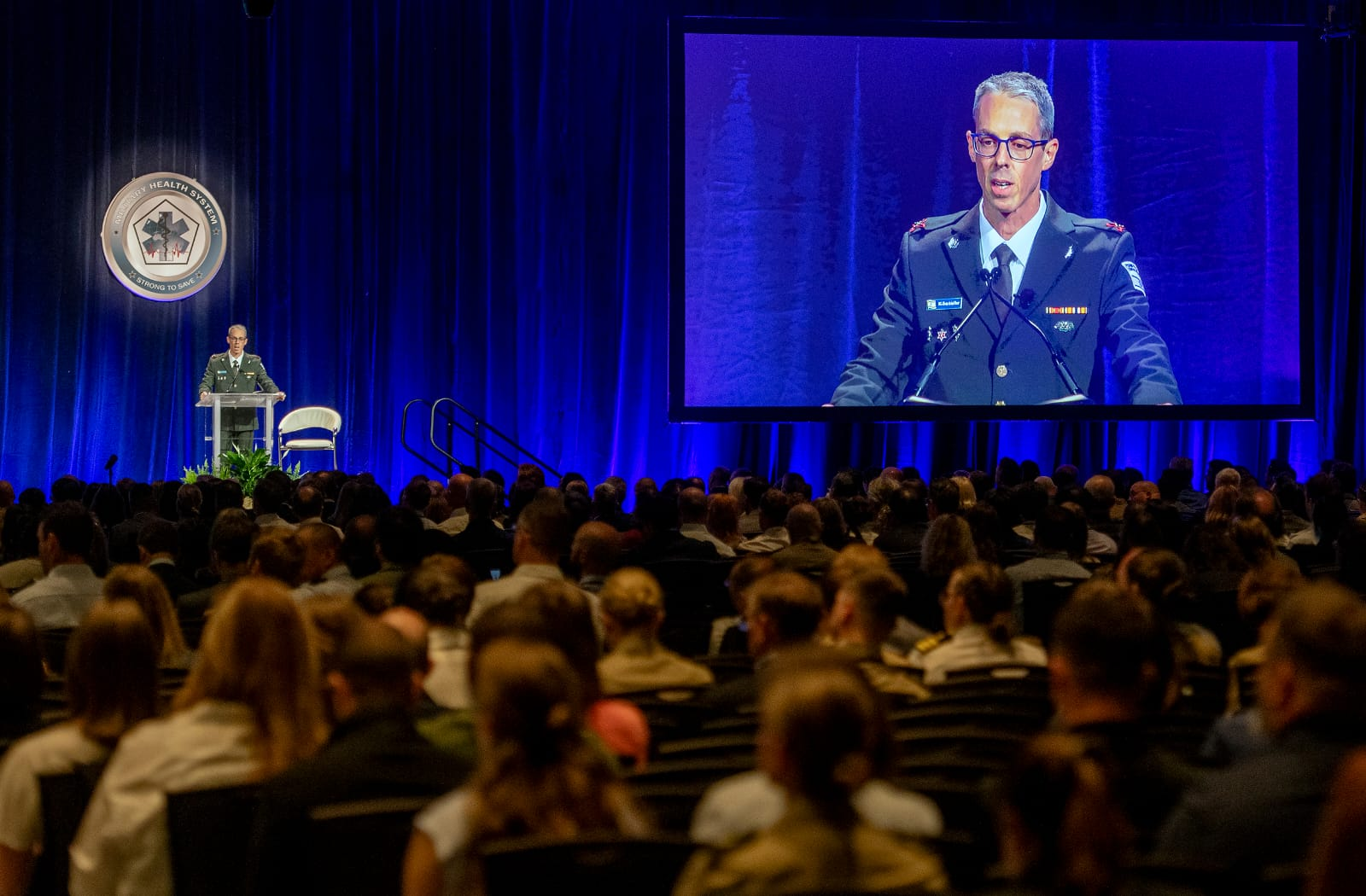
MHSRS conference, Florida 2025

== Personal life ==
Beer lives in Givatayim. He is openly gay. He is married to Erez, a pianist and piano teacher, and a father of two.
