= Eli Sprecher =

Israeli physician-scientist

- אלי שפרכר
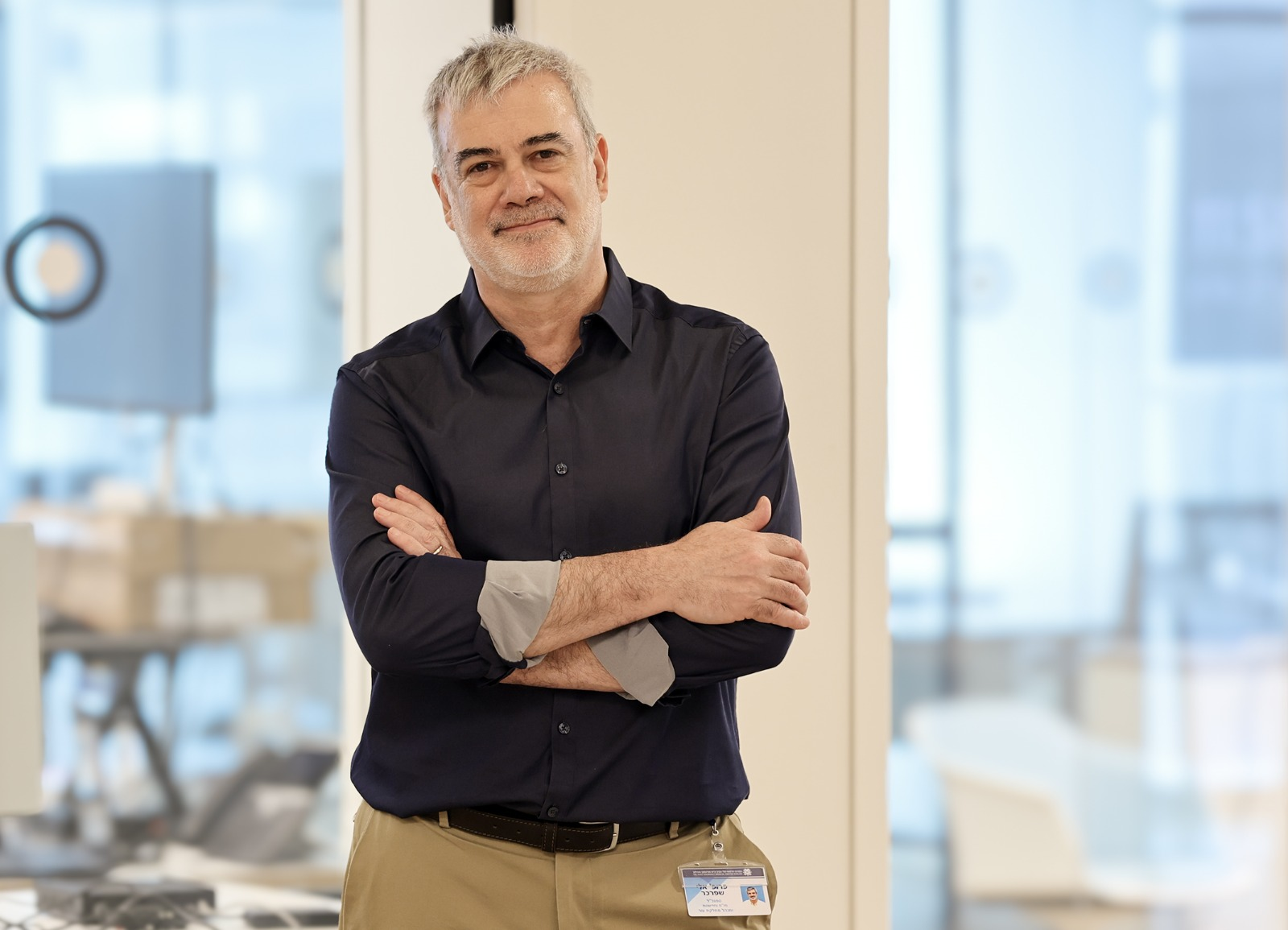
- Born: August 9, 1963 (age 63); Waterloo, Belgium
- Citizenship: Israel
- Education: Hebrew University of Jerusalem, Thomas Jefferson University, Tel Aviv University
- Scientific career
- Fields: Genetics, Dermatology, Hospital Management
- Workplaces: Tel Aviv Sourasky Medical Center (Ichilov), Tel Aviv University

Eli Sprecher (born 1963) is an Israeli physician-scientist, specializing in dermatology and genetics. He is the current CEO of the Tel Aviv Sourasky Medical Center (Ichilov) and previously served as deputy director for research and development and head of the Dermatology Division at the same institution.

== Early life and education ==
Born in Belgium, his mother was a virologist at the Pasteur Institute, among the first researchers to study HIV/AIDS, and his father was a chemist in industry.

After completing high school in Waterloo, Belgium, in 1981, Sprecher earned his MD and PhD in molecular virology from the Hebrew University of Jerusalem. He later served as a physician in the Israeli Air Force and completed his residency in dermatology at Rambam Medical Center, with further specialization in human genetics at Thomas Jefferson University in Philadelphia, USA. He also holds an MBA from Tel Aviv University and is board-certified in dermatology and healthcare system management.

== Professional career ==
Between 2006 and 2008, Sprecher served as deputy director of the Rappaport Institute of Research at the Technion – Israel Institute of Technology and founded the Center for Translational Genetics at Rambam Medical Center. From 2008 to 2024, he led the Dermatology Division at the Tel Aviv Sourasky Medical Center. He was responsible for advancing patient safety and innovation during his tenure as deputy CEO for patient safety (2016–2019) and deputy CEO for research and development (2016–2024). In 2024, Sprecher succeeded Professor Ronni Gamzu as CEO of Tel Aviv Sourasky Medical Center.

A full professor at the Tel Aviv University Faculty of Medical and Health Sciences, he holds the Frederick Reiss Chair in Dermatology and served as vice dean of the Faculty of Medicine (2022–2024). Internationally, he has chaired the International Pachyonychia congenita Consortium and was the first Israeli president of the European Society for Dermatological Research (ESDR).

== Academic contributions ==
Sprecher’s research has focused on the genetic basis of skin diseases. His team’s work on the mechanism underlying fingerprint formation was included among the "60 Israeli Discoveries That Changed the World" by the Ministry of Innovation, Science, and Technology. Additionally, his 2019 publication on the genetic basis of hair loss in African women was featured in the New England Journal of Medicine.

Sprecher has authored over 400 scientific papers and trained more than 110 students and residents. He is a member of editorial boards for eight international journals and has received numerous prestigious awards, including the Kligman Award from the American Society for Dermatological Research, the Alfred Marchionini Award from the International Society for Dermatology, the International Award from the European Academy of Dermatology and Venereology and the Teva Founders Prize. He is an honorary lifetime member of the German and British Dermatological Societies and holds an honorary doctorate from Kirov University.
