= Yehuda Danon =

Israeli Surgeon General

- יהודה דנון
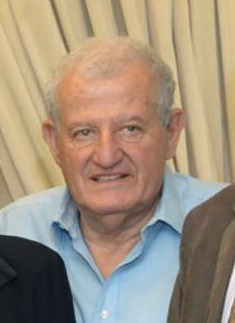
- Yehuda Danon (2015)
- Born: 1940 (age 85–86)
- Education: Hadassah Hebrew University Medical School
- Occupation: Medical Doctor
- Known for: Surgeon General of the Israel Defense Forces; Director General of Beilinson Medical Center; President of Ariel University

Yehuda Danon (Hebrew: יהודה דנון; born 1940) is an Israeli doctor who has been the Surgeon General of the Israel Defense Forces, the Director General of Beilinson Medical Center, and - since 2012 - the President of Ariel University.

== Education ==
Danon graduated from Hadassah Hebrew University Medical School, and specialized in pediatrics and immunology. Danon served as the Surgeon General of the Israel Defense Forces from 1982 to 1991.

== Career ==
He was the Director General of Beilinson Medical Center, and founded the Schneider Children’s Hospital. He established the Israeli Ministry of Health’s National Council for Children’s Health and Pediatrics, and has served as chairman since its establishment.

Danon became President of Ariel University in October 2012.
