= Ronni Gamzu =

Director of Israel's Ichilov Hospital

- רוני גמזו
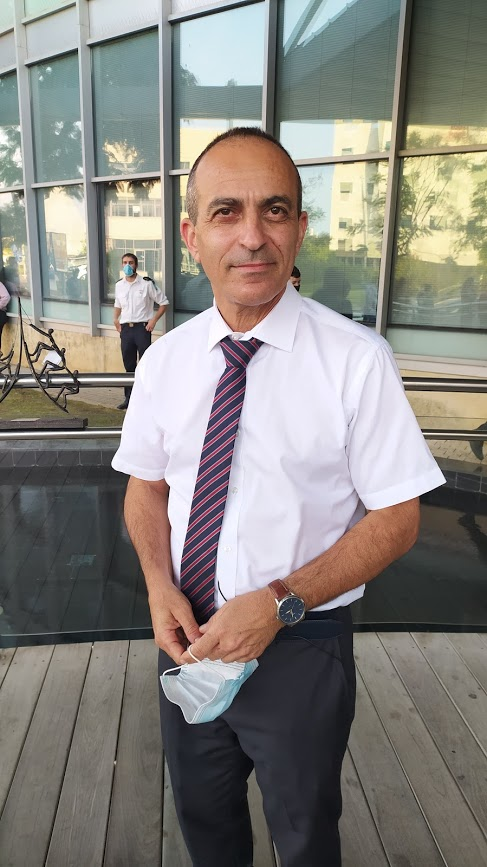
- Born: 27 January 1966
- Education: Tel Aviv University
- Scientific career
- Fields: Medical Doctor

Ronni Gamzu (Hebrew: רוני גמזו; born 27 January 1966) is an Israeli doctor and professor whose specialties include obstetrics and gynaecology and healthcare management. He served as the director of Ichilov Hospital (the Tel Aviv Sourasky Medical Center) from 2015 until 2024, when he was succeeded by Eli Sprecher.

== Early life and education ==
Gamzu was born in Israel. He earned his medical degree from Tel Aviv University, where he also completed postgraduate training in public health. Throughout his academic career, he specialized in health systems management and policy, focusing on healthcare delivery and public health strategy.

== Career ==
Ronni Gamzu began his medical career in the early 1990s, working in various hospitals in Israel. He later transitioned to public health, taking on leadership roles that involved healthcare system reforms and managing large-scale health initiatives.

Gamzu became widely known for his work in managing health services in Israel’s Ministry of Health, particularly his involvement in the response to the COVID-19 pandemic. In 2020, he was appointed the national coordinator for Israel's COVID-19 response, where he oversaw efforts to manage and mitigate the spread of the virus. His tenure involved coordinating testing, vaccination programs, and enforcing public health regulations across the country.

In addition to his role during the pandemic, Gamzu has served in leadership positions at several Israeli hospitals, including as the director of Tel Aviv's Ichilov Hospital. His administrative expertise has led to significant improvements in hospital management and healthcare delivery systems.
