= Gertner Institute for Epidemiology and Health Policy Research =

Israeli think tank

- מכון גרטנר לחקר אפידמיולוגיה ומדיניות בריאות
- Logo of the Gertner Institute
- Founder: Mordechai Shani
- Type: Think tank Health policy research Institute
- Purpose: Epidemiology; Heallth policy research
- Headquarters: Tel HaShomer, Israel
- Coordinates: 32.04895093°N 34.84424284°E
- Fields: Epidemiology; Epidemiology of cancer; Radiation Health; Health policy
- Official language: Hebrew, English
- Director: Eldad Katorza
- Parent organization: Ministry of Health (Israel)
- Affiliations: Sheba Medical Center; Sackler School of Medicine, Tel Aviv
- Website: www.gertnerinst.org.il/e/

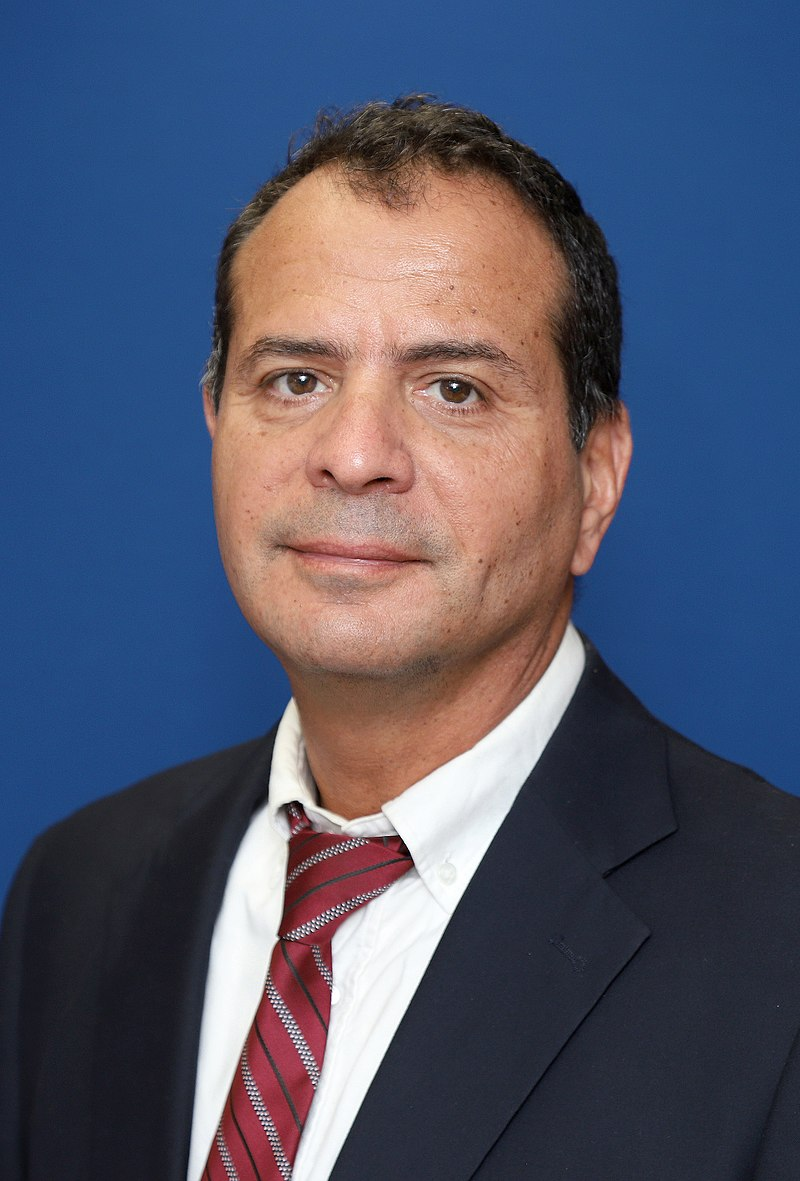
Eldad Katorza, Director of the Gertner Institute

The Gertner Institute for Epidemiology and Health Policy Research is an Israeli think tank for the Ministry of Health (Israel) founded by Mordechai Shani in Tel HaShomer in 1992. Eldad Katorza was named director in 2021.
