= Moshe Revach =

Israeli medical director

Moshe Revach (also known as Moshe Roach, Hebrew: משה רווח; born January 29, 1940) is an Israeli physician who served as the chief medical officer of the Israel Defense Forces (IDF) from 1983 to 1987, and from 1987 to 2005 as director of the Rambam Medical Center in Haifa. From 2010 to 2021, he was chairman of the board of Maccabi Health Services.

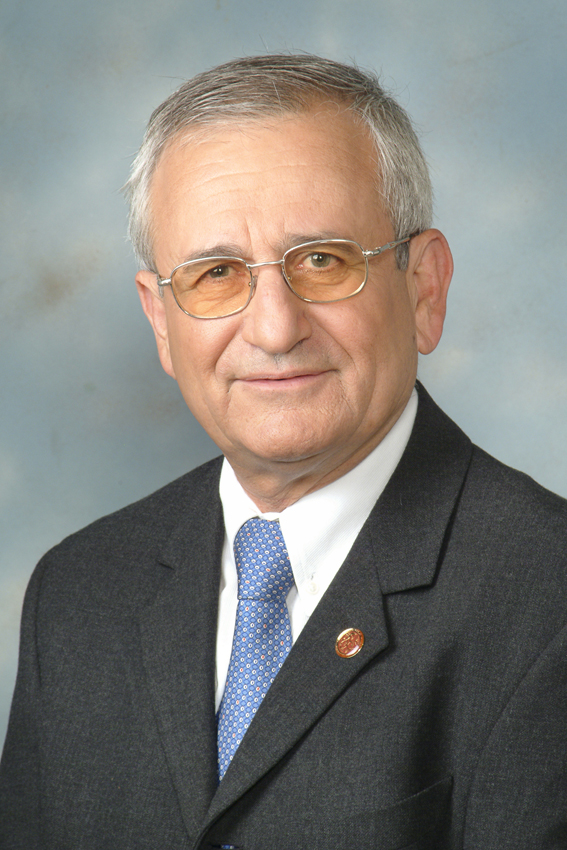
Moshe Revach, 2005

== Biography ==
Revach studied medicine at the Hebrew University of Jerusalem from 1958 to 1965, as part of the academic reserve. In 1966 he began regular service in the IDF as a battalion doctor in the 52nd Armored Battalion, a position he also held during the Six Day War. From 1967 to 1968 he was a brigade medical officer in the14th Brigade in Sinai. In 1969 he was on a mission in Kurdistan. During the Yom Kippur War, he served as a brigade doctor in the Iron Fist Brigade. From 1974 to 1976 he was a command physician in the Southern Command, in 1980 he was appointed a deputy corporal, and from 1983 to 1987 he served as chief medical officer with the rank of brigadier general.

On January 17,1987, he began serving as the director of the Rambam Medical Center, serving in this position until 2005. He was a member of the Technion's Faculty of Medicine with the rank of associate professor and published more than 30 articles in medical journals. From 2010 to 2021, he served as chairman of the board of Maccabi Healthcare Services.

He is married to Dina and has 3 daughters.
