= Tel Aviv Sourasky Medical Center =

Tel Aviv Sourasky Medical Center המרכז הרפואי תל אביב ע"ש סוראסקי

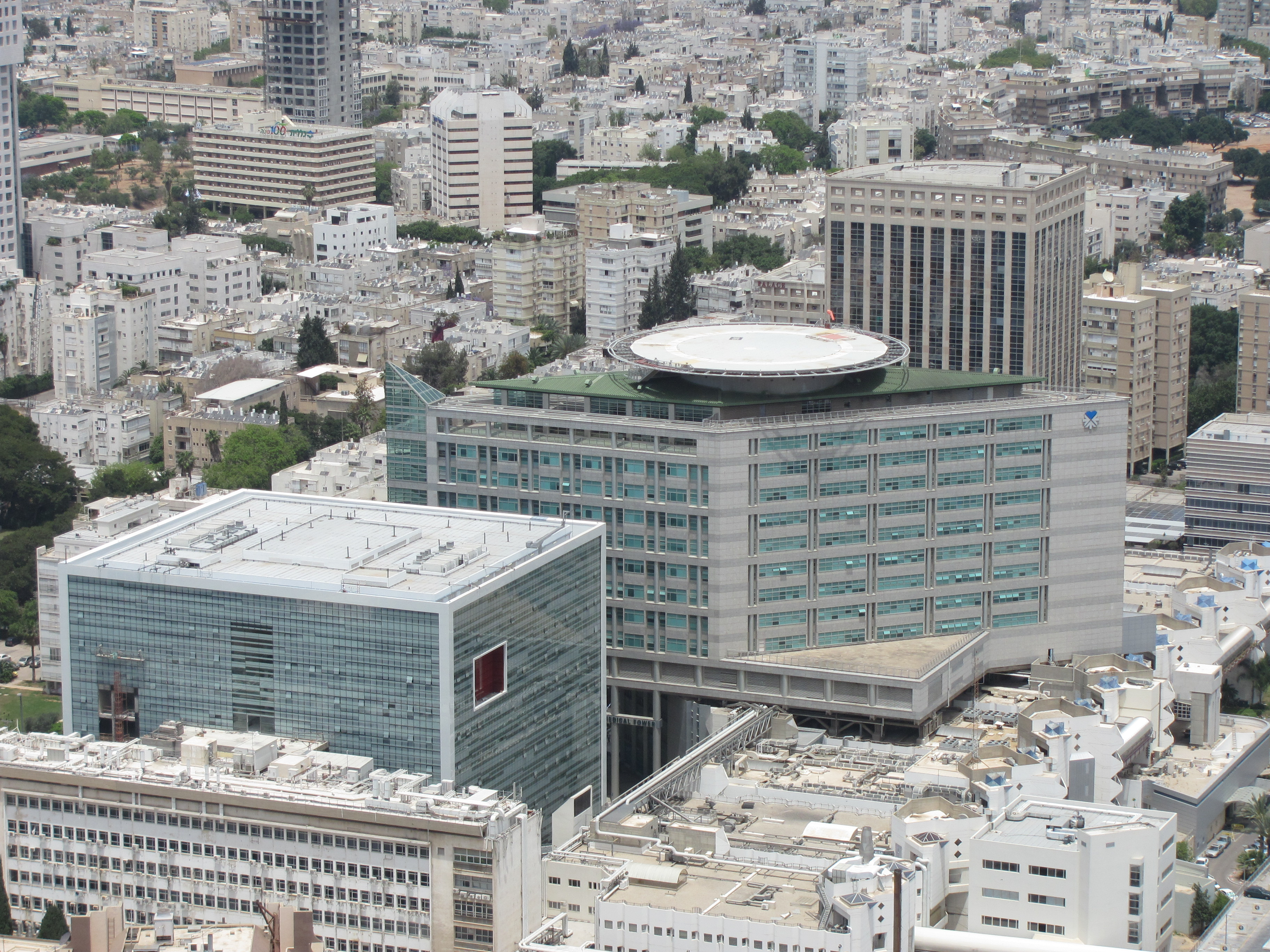
- Aerial view of Tel Aviv Sourasky Medical Center, Tel Aviv

Geography
- Location: Tel Aviv, Israel
- Coordinates: 32°04′50″N 34°47′24″E

Organisation
- Care system: Public
- Type: Teaching, District General
- Affiliated university: Tel Aviv University
- Patron: Ichilov family

Services
- Emergency department: Yes
- Beds: 1,171 (as of 2020)

Helipads
- Helipad: Yes

History
- Founded: 1963

Links
- Website: www.tasmc.org.il

Tel Aviv Sourasky Medical Center (Hebrew: המרכז הרפואי תל אביב ע"ש סוראסקי), commonly referred to as Ichilov Hospital (Hebrew: בית החולים איכילוב) is the largest teaching hospital serving Tel Aviv, Israel and its metropolitan area. It is the second largest hospital complex in the country. The complex is spread out over an area of 150,000 square metres (1,600,000 sq ft)and incorporates four hospitals: Ichilov General Hospital and Ida Sourasky Rehabilitation Center, Lis Maternity Hospital, and Dana Children's Hospital. The director of the Tel Aviv Sourasky Medical Center is Prof. Eli Sprecher.

In 2025, Newsweek ranked it as the 2nd best hospital in Israel and the 60th best hospital in the world.

== History ==
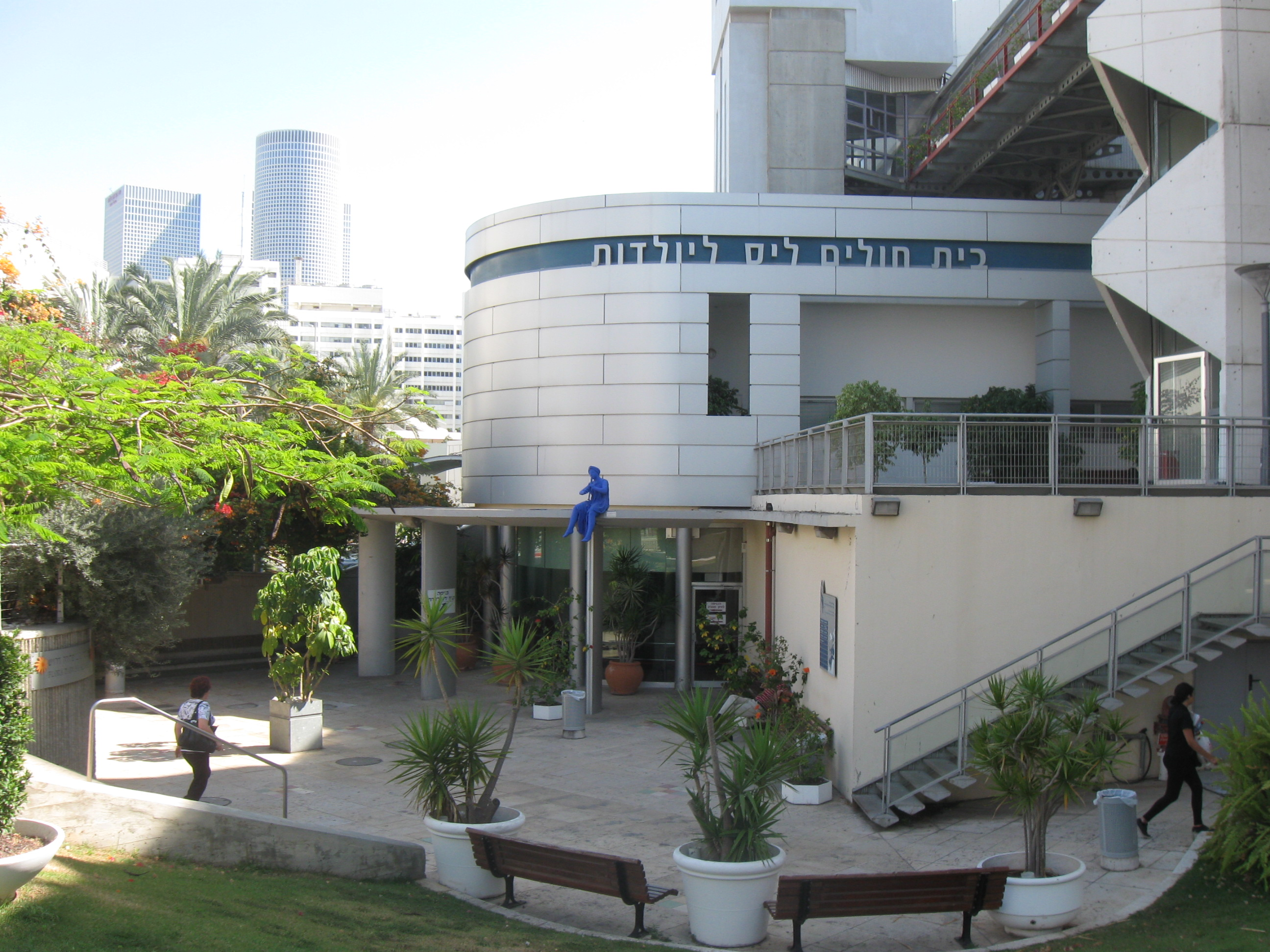
Lis Maternity Hospital

The hospital was originally named after the Ichilov family. Ichilov Hospital was founded in 1963 as a one-building facility designed by architect Arieh Sharon. Renamed Tel Aviv Sourasky Medical Center, it now encompasses three hospitals over an area of 150,000 square metres (1,600,000 sq ft): Ichilov General Hospital and Ida Sourasky Rehabilitation Center, Lis Maternity Hospital, and Dana Children's Hospital. The center also serves as an instructional and research center affiliated with Tel Aviv University's Faculty of Medical and Health Sciences and Sheinborn Nursing School.

The main building of Ichilov Hospital was built with the donations of Ted Arison and Shari Arison.

In 2011, a 700–1,000 bed bombproof emergency facility was opened. The building, with 13 stories above ground and four stories underground, provides protection against conventional, chemical and biological attack. Construction began in 2008. The cost of the building was $110 million, with a donation of $45 million from Israeli billionaire Sammy Ofer. The architect was Arad Sharon, grandson of Arieh Sharon who designed the original facility.

In 2022, the world's largest emergency room was opened at Ichilov Hospital. The 8,000 square metres (86,000 sq ft) facility is equipped with facilities for self-triage and robots to guide people around.

== See also ==
- Health care in Israel
- Medical tourism in Israel
